= Glogonj =

Glogonj Глогоњ
- Village (Selo)
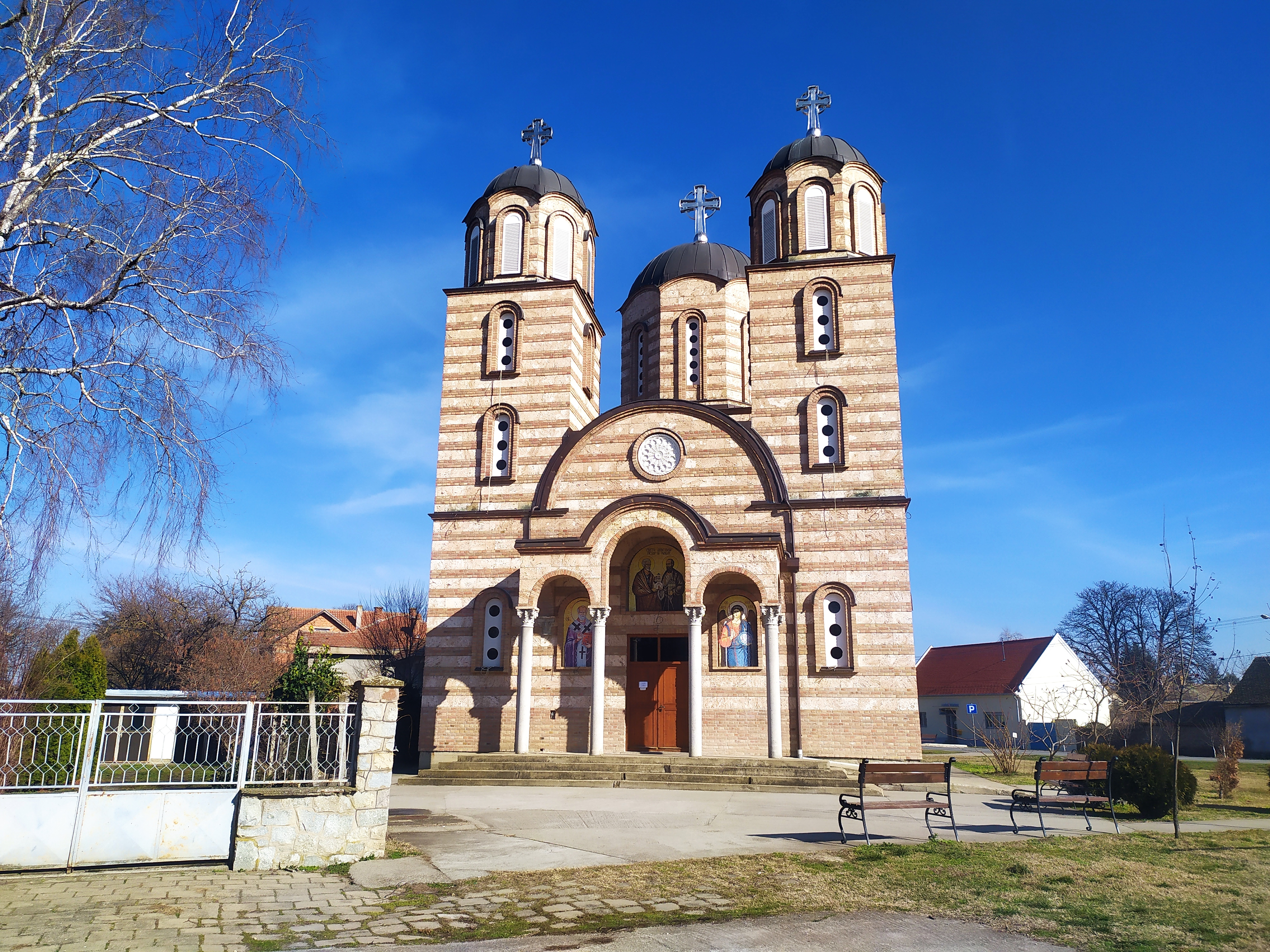
- Saint Peter and Saint Paul Orthodox Church

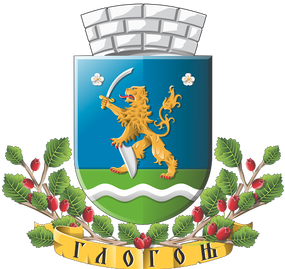
- Coat of arms

- Location of Glogonj within Serbia Glogonj (Serbia) Glogonj (Europe)
- Coordinates: 44°59′N 20°32′E
- Country: Serbia
- Province: Vojvodina
- District: South Banat
- Municipality: Pančevo

Area
  - Total: 42.77 km^{2} (16.51 sq mi)

Population (2022)
  - Total: 2,657
  - Density: 62.12/km^{2} (160.9/sq mi)
- Time zone: UTC+1 (CET)
  - Summer (DST): UTC+2 (CEST)
- Area code: +381(0)13
- Car plates: PA

Glogonj (Serbian Cyrillic: Глогоњ,) is a village in Serbia, situated in the South Banat District of the province of Vojvodina. It is located on the banks of the Tamiš River, about 20 kilometers northwest of Pančevo, and about 20 kilometers direct north of Belgrade. It has a Serb ethnic majority, numbering 2,657 people as of 2022. Its neighboring villages are Sefkerin to the north and Jabuka to the south. All of them lie on the Tamiš.

== Name ==
The name 'Glogonj' refers to the shrubs of the Hawthorn tree, (Crataegus) that was prevalent in the settlement during ancient times.

The name was first mentioned as a settlement in 1586.

== History ==
=== Early history ===
The area may have been inhabited as far back as the Bronze Age and the Roman Age, (based on archaeological finds). During the Middle Ages, the regions in this area were collectively called the "Banat", a reference to a 'military Zone.' It was politically intertwined with the Avars, Bulgarians and the Hungarians. It was part of the Ottoman Empire from the 16th to 18th centuries, until the Habsburg Monachy took over the area.

In 1718, with the Treaty of Passarowitz, the Habsburg monarchy had captured much of the Banat Region from the Ottomans and by the 1760s, they were fortifying the border regions of the Banat with German-speaking colonists from all over Central Europe to settle and farm the land, (Danube Swabians). The Danube River became the natural border between the Austrian Empire and Turkish-occupied Serbia. It is said that Emperor Joseph II of Austria visited the village of Glogon on May 9, 1768 during a tour of the Banat Region. A Catholic church (St. Anna) was first built in Glogon during the 1770s. During the Austro-Turkish War (1788–1791) Glogon was burnt by Turkish forces and in 1790 it was raveged by cholera.

=== 19th and early 20th Century ===
Romanian settlers arrived in the early 19th century. In 1806 an Orthodox Church was built. In 1812, a nursery of fruit trees was established in Glogon.

The population of Glogon for most of the 19th century was about a couple thousand people and most of the people spoke German. There was also a Romanian minority living there. After the formation of Austria-Hungary in 1867, Glogon and the neighboring villages fell under Hungarian jurisdiction. The Hungarian name of the village was 'Galagonyás'.

By the late 1890s and early 1900s, many young men and their families from Glogon, and the neighboring villages, left their homes to migrate to the United States and Canada to start a new life.

After the end of WWI, with the Treaty of Trianon in 1920, Glogon and the surrounding areas of the Banat become part of the newly established Kingdom of Serbs, Croats and Slovenes with Belgrade as its capital. German-speaking villages, such as Glogon, kept their autonomy

In 1935, the village founded an amateur Football/Soccer Team, FK Glogonj.

=== Second World War ===
In April 1941, Nazi Germany Invaded Yugoslavia. The Panzer-Grenadier-Division 'Grossdeutschland' occupied Glogon and other surrounding villages as they captured Belgrade. The German Wehrmacht then placed the Serbian section of Yugolslavia under a military government. Ethnic German men in the Banat region were recruited to join the Wehrmacht or the newly-formed Waffen-SS unit Prinz Eugen.

By mid-October 1944, the Soviet Red Army and Yugoslav Partisans captured Glogon and the surrounding villages during the 'Belgrade Offensive'. Some of the ethnic Germans in Glogon were shot and some of the women were raped and found dead. The new communist Yugoslav regime began reprisals and deprived all ethnic Germans of their citizenship and civil rights. On October 30, 1944, special detachments of the Yugoslav People's Liberation Committee shot 128 residents from Glogon on site. The surviving ethnic Germans were taken to labor camps in nearby areas, (such as Rudolfsgnad) where most would die of disease, starvation and the cold. The empty villages were fenced off, houses boarded up and remained abandoned for the rest of the war.

=== Yugoslav Era ===
After the war, the village was repopulated with Serbs and groups from undeveloped mountainous regions from the south. The new inhabitants moved into the old "Swabian houses" and were given possession of several square meters of land for farming. During the Yugoslav era, some brief scenes in Yugoslav films were shot near the village, such as 'Aleksa Dundic' (1958) and 'The Mogols' (1961). At the Tamis River just outside Glogonj a scene from the movie 'Ko to tamo peva' (Who's Singin' Over There?) (1980) was shot there. The area is now a picnic place with a poster of the movie.

=== Post-Yugoslav Era ===
After the fall of communism in Eastern Europe in 1989, and the break-up of Yugoslavia in 1991, Glogonj was unaffected during the Yugoslav Wars. After the wars, ethnic German historians began to visit the Banat areas of their Danube-Swabian ancestors, such as in Glogonj. In the early 2000s a project was underway to renovate and repair the old German Roman Catholic cemetery outside of Glogonj. In June 2009, historian Anton Nahm, whose ancestors lived in Glogon, along with other political and church leaders, officially rededicated the cemetery and its new chapel.

In 2012 a new Orthodox Church (St. Peter and Paul) was built in Glogonj.

== Historical population ==
Austrian-Hungarian census of 1881 was only based on native language of 2468 total inhabitants, 11 spoke Hungarian, 1480 German, 8 Slovak, 630 Romanian, 220 Croatian-Serbian, and 124 did not indicate any language priority according to own census statement: beszélni nem tudó.

- 1910: 2,669 (1,745 Germans, 756 Romanians, 72 Hungarians, 61 Croats, 13 Serbs, 22 others
- 1961: 3,230
- 1971: 3,257
- 1981: 3,605
- 1991: 3,475
- 2002: 3,178 (2,400 Serbs, 927 Macedonians, 367 Romanians and 255 others)

== Literature ==
- Franz Lang: Mit uns in Glogonj 1767–1945. Self-Published book (German), Karlsruhe 1990.

== See also ==
- Pančevački Rit
- List of places in Serbia
- List of cities, towns and villages in Vojvodina
