= Jabuka, Pančevo =

Jabuka Јабука (Serbian) Јабука (Macedonian) Iabuca (Romanian)
- Village (Selo)
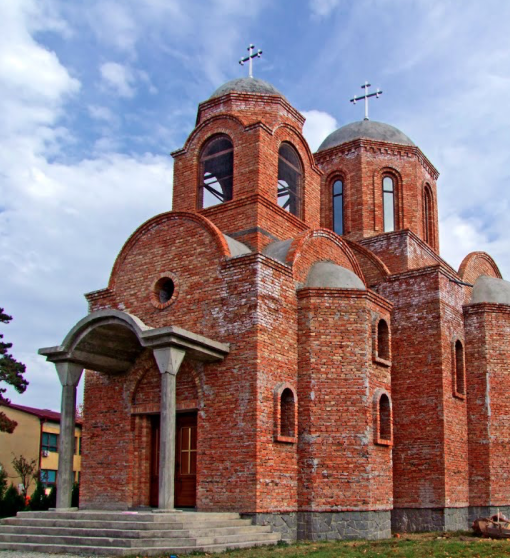
- Orthodox church Saint Elijah

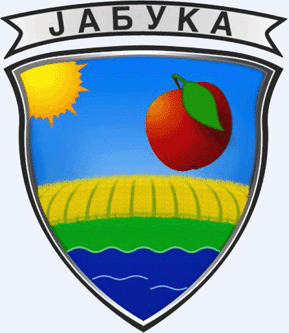
- Coat of arms
- Interactive map of Jabuka
- Location of Jabuka within Serbia Jabuka (Serbia) Jabuka (Europe)
- Coordinates: 44°56′35″N 20°35′35″E
- Country: Serbia
- Province: Vojvodina
- District: South Banat
- Municipality: Pančevo

Area
  - Total: 51.79 km^{2} (20.00 sq mi)
- Elevation: 79 m (259 ft)

Population (2022)
  - Total: 5,650
  - Density: 109/km^{2} (283/sq mi)
- Time zone: UTC+1 (CET)
  - Summer (DST): UTC+2 (CEST)
- Postal code: 26201
- Area code: +381(0)13
- Car plates: PA

Jabuka (Serbian Cyrillic and Macedonian: Јабука; in Romanian: Iabuca; in Hungarian: Torontálalmás) is a village located on the shores of Tamiš River in the municipality of Pančevo, South Banat District, Vojvodina, Serbia. The village numbers 5,650 people (census 2022) and has the largest ethnic Macedonian population in Serbia by percentage.

== Name ==
Jabuka or Јабука means 'apple' in Serbian, the Hungarian name Torontálalmás (official name from 1898 to 1920) means 'apple of Torontál', and the German official name Apfeldorf, in use from March 1943 to September 1944, meant 'apple village'. According to an unconfirmed legend, Jabuka was founded by Slavic fishermen who settled near an apple tree on the left bank of the Timiș River .

== Geography ==
Jabuka is located on flat and fertile plain nearby Timiș River at 44°56′35″N 20°35′35″E, approximately 11 km northwest of Pančevo and 27 km northeast of Pančevo bridge to Belgrade.

== History ==
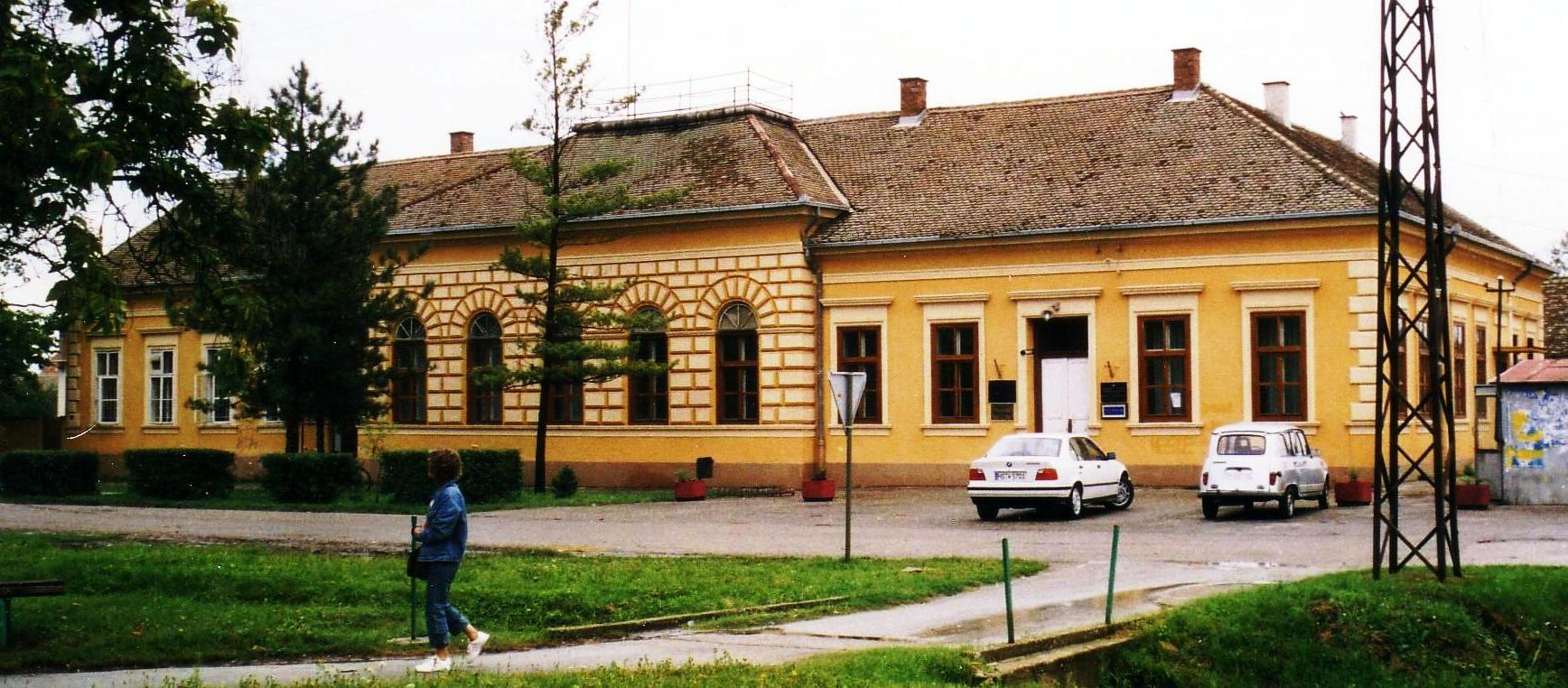
Community office in Jabuka, built in 1901

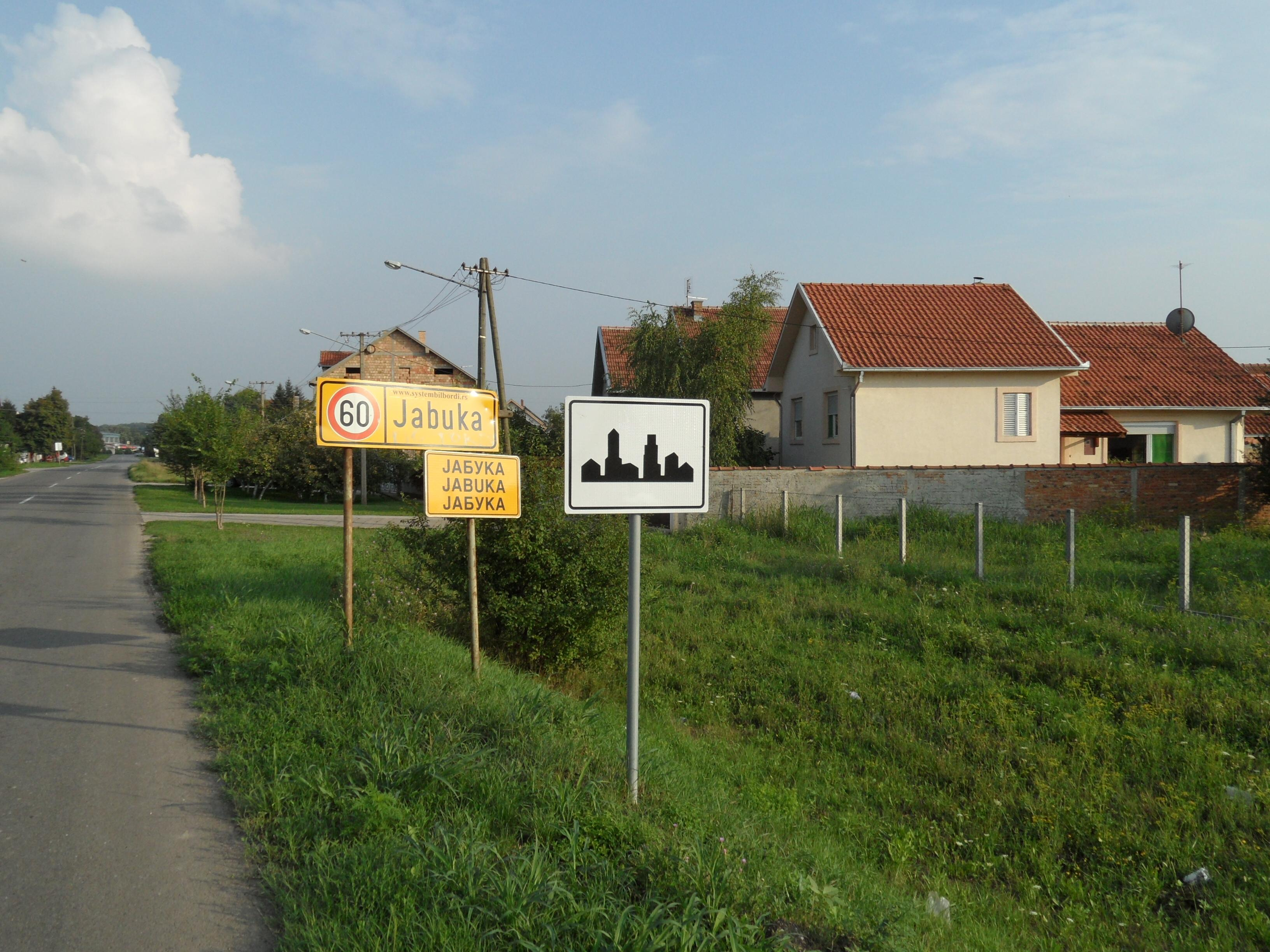
Entry to the village

In the 1970s, scientific staff of Archaeological Institute Belgrade carried out extensive excavations on communal area. The scientists found objects and tracks of temporary settlement of Neolithic (Vinča and Starčevo cultures), Chalcolithic (Baden culture) and Iron periods.

The communal area was part of Temeşvar Eyalet in Ottoman Empire since 1552, after the Treaty of Požarevac part of Habsburg's Banat, since 1765 of military frontier (Austrian Empire) and then it belonged to Torontál county of Austria-Hungary. After World War I was that area part of provisional Torontalsko-tamiške županja (Treaty of Trianon), in 1922 of Belgrade oblast and since 1929 of Danubian Banovina in Kingdom of Yugoslavia. In time after World War II its belonged to Srez Pančevo of Socialist Federal Republic of Yugoslavia and the Federal Republic of Yugoslavia. The communal area of Jabuka was part of administrative region of Pančevo municipality from all these centuries to the present.

According to legend, first published in print in 1912, Jabuka was founded in the late 17th and early 18th century by Serbian fishermen who settled near an apple tree on the left bank of the Timiș River. There is, however, no deed actual historical record of founding by first settlers.

The modern village of Jabuka was founded by Slavic fishermen in the end of 17th and beginning of the 18th century. ("Selo je imalo 15 porodica slovenskog porekla", their names were Stoikov, Stepan, Pavao and Damian) The settlers might have come from Romania or Bulgaria. In the first half of the 18th century there were about 15 houses in the village. After the peace treaty with the Ottomans in 1726, Claudius Florimund Graf von Mercy, a man with Lorraine origin, took control of the administration of the Military Frontier. He ordered the inhabitants of Jabuka to be members of the border battalion (Grenzbezirkshauptmannschaft) Opovo - Pančevo. The census from 1733 recorded 19 Slavic (i.e. Serb) families in the village. In the middle of the 18th century, there was 60 houses in the village, and during this time, its inhabitants were Serbs.

In 1921, population of village numbered 3,265 inhabitants, including 2,819 Germans, 348 Romanians, 73 Hungarians, 20 Serbs or Croats, 2 Slovenes, 2 Russians and 1 Englishman.

During the World War II Axis occupation of Yugoslavia, from 1941 to 1944, the village was part of the German-administered Banat region, that had special status within Serbia. In 1941, on a location named Stratište near the village, German forces killed around 600 Jews and Roma in three separate executions. After the defeat of Axis powers, in December 1944 the new Yugoslav communist authorities declared the German population as "enemies of the people" and sent them to communist prison camps. After the abolishment of the camps in 1948, most of the remaining German population left from Yugoslavia. In 1945, a monument (memorial pyramid) dedicated to these victims was built, and later, another monument with memorial house was built too.

In the time period after World War II the village was settled with families from Macedonia, many of them originating from Kriva Palanka Municipality. In 1948, the majority of inhabitants were Macedonians (2,806 or 63.88%).

Historical population
Year	Pop.	±%
1948	4,392	—
1981	6,453	+46.9%
2002	6,312	−2.2%

=== Topographic history ===
On 9 May 1768, Joseph II wrote an impression of the structural condition of the village during his inspection of the new part of southern military frontier into his diary: "Jabuka is worst of all villages." At the instigation of Viennese Hofkriegsrat and after approval of the financing by Viennese Hofkammer the village was new created and built up until 1774. There is a historical plan of the new village which is kept at the Austrian National Archives. At the beginning of the 19th century, cotton was planted on a trial basis in the northern Jabuka area but it was stopped because of long-term profitability reasons. In 1808, Archduke Ludwig opened a fruit plant nursery which existed until 1873. There is an impression of the old village and the plant nursery (German Obstgarten Plantage) which is recorded on the map of the Franciscan land survey from the early 19th century at the National Archives of Austria. In 1905, cadastral maps of the village were recorded which are kept at the National Archives of Hungary. In 1910, the village consisted of 675 buildings, 478 made of stones or bricks, 147 made of air dried bricks or clay with stone or brick foundation and 50 made of timber or other materials. 627 buildings had roofs made of tiles, slate or sheet metal and 48 made of thatched reeds or straw.

From 1959 to 1960, the old Roman Catholic Church was demolished due to dilapidated and damp foundations. A part of the dry bricks was used for construction and renovation of new and old houses of the village. The Church was built from 1773 to 1774 in neoclassical stile and renovated gradually and partially from 1829 to 1833, and its deed, dated 14 November 1833, was sealed in a niche behind altar during consecration ceremony, and original deed of foundation stone laid, dated 4 July, was situated on the ground in front of altar. After demolition of last remains of foundation walls, both historical deeds were handed over by governmental authorities of village to Diocese of Zrenjanin and Historical Archive Pančevo. The church was dedicated to Saint Leopold and stood on the place on which the modern school extension including sports hall is now, opened in school year 1961/62.

In 1901, the small Orthodox church was built (consecration deed, dated 24 June). Before completion of the church, the Orthodox residents (369 Vlachs and 13 Serbs in 1890) had to go to the churches of the competent parish communities in Sefkerin or Pančevo. The Church is dedicated to Saint Demetrius. In 2011, the construction of the big Eastern Orthodox Church started, which was mostly financed by donations. The first mass was celebrated in August 2014. The church is consecrated to the Prophet Elijah. The new sacral building of the village is opposite the primary school Gotse Delchev in the center of the village.

== Economy ==
The main occupation of the people is in agriculture, as with many other local settlements. However, many of the inhabitants also work in the factories of the neighbouring city of Pančevo. There is an industrial starch factory on the municipal area.

== Culture ==
Given that Jabuka was mostly populated with Macedonians, much of the cultural life of the village reflects these people's cultural traditions. In 1961, the cultural center Kočo Racin was founded in the village. Every year the national holiday Ilinden is celebrated. Since 2008, the festival Tavče Gravče has been also celebrated in the village.

In 2001, local Romani people have formed the association Crni Biseri (Black Pearls). In 2007, some residents founded the cultural and artistic society KUD Vasil Hadžimanov.

== Sports ==
There is a football club named OFK Jugoslavija in the village. It was founded in 1935 and its club colors are blue and white. Since 1998, there is a handball club (Rukometni Klub) named RK Jabuka.

== Gallery ==
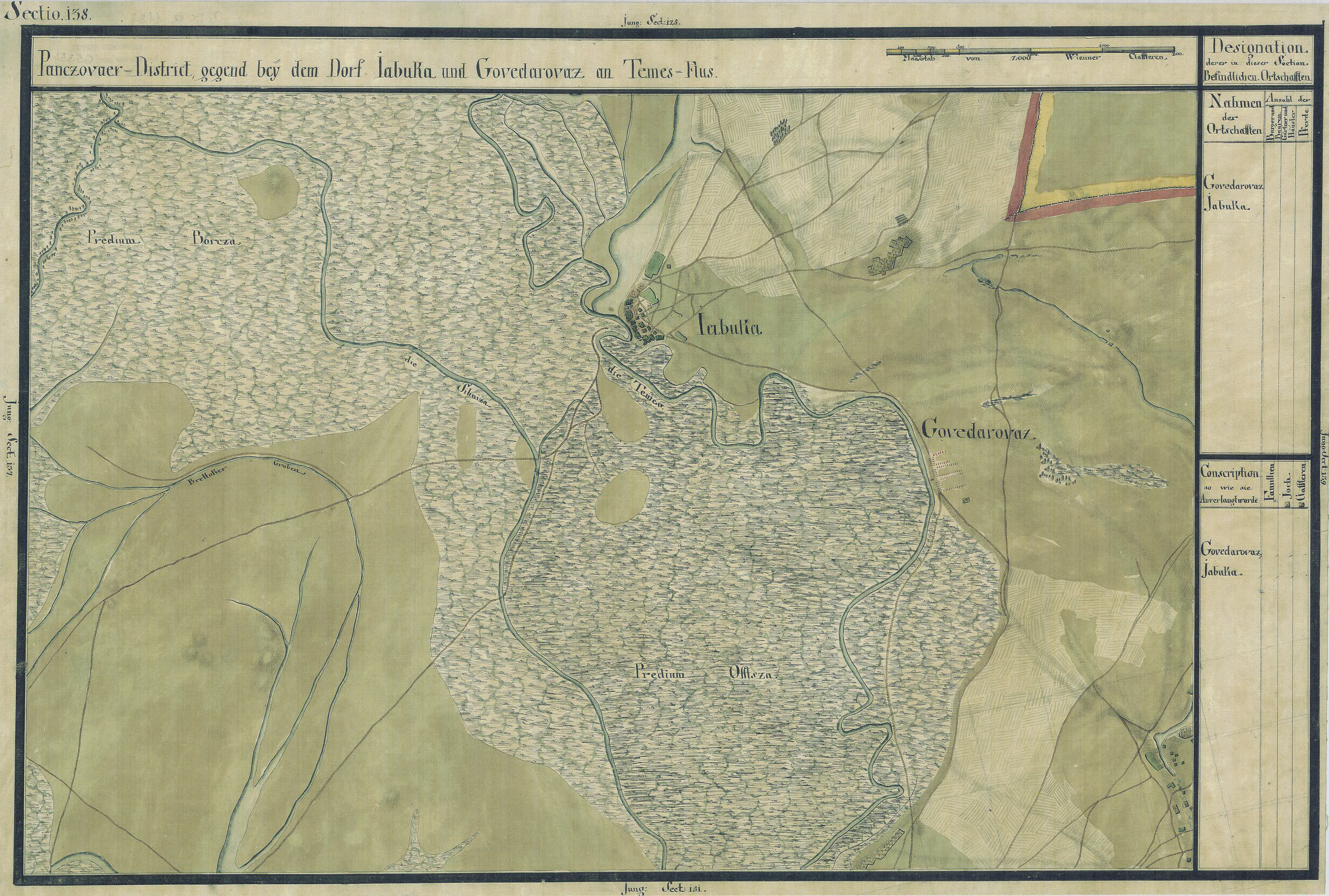
National Archives of Austria, Map of the Josephinian Land Survey (1769–1772)

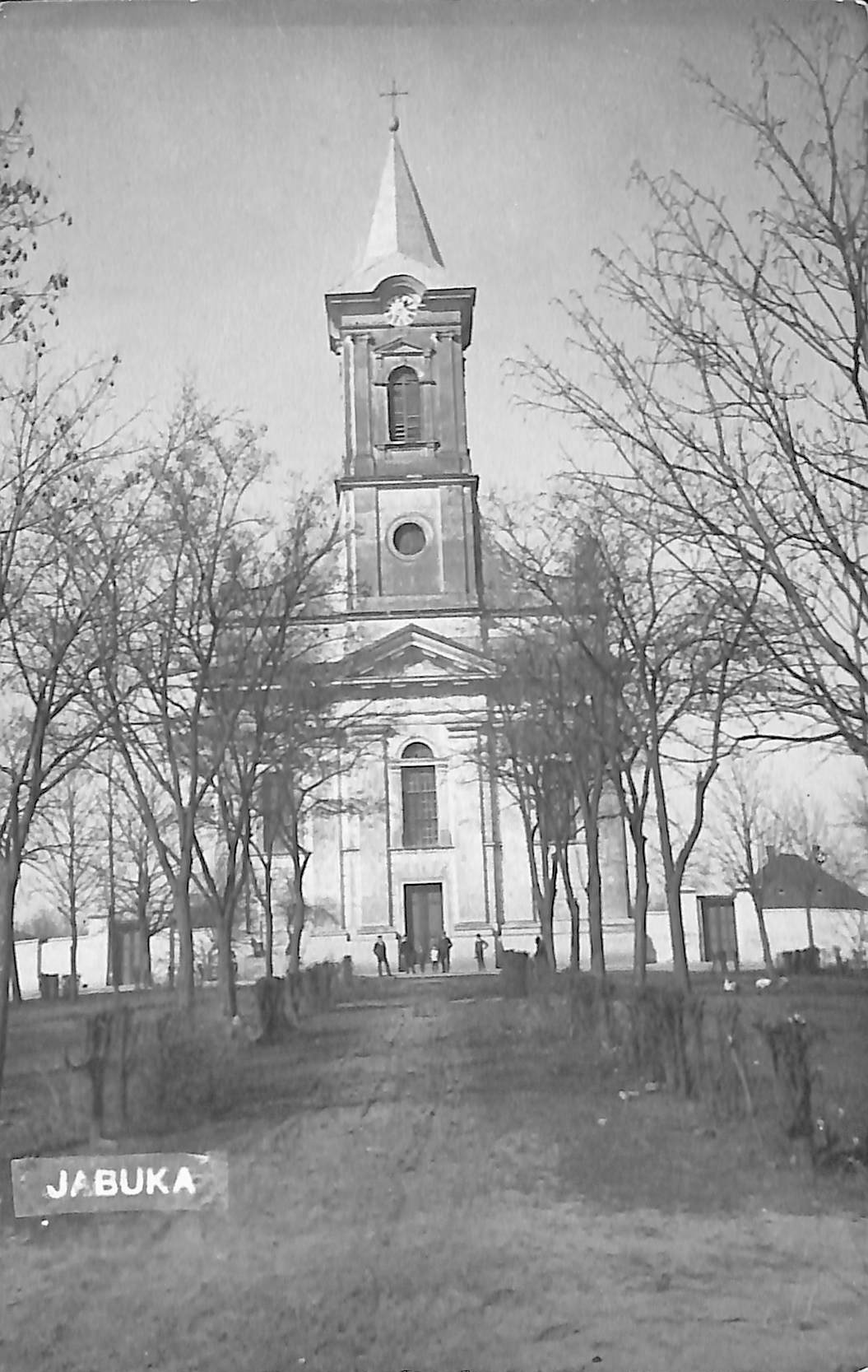
Roman Catholic Church Saint Leopold

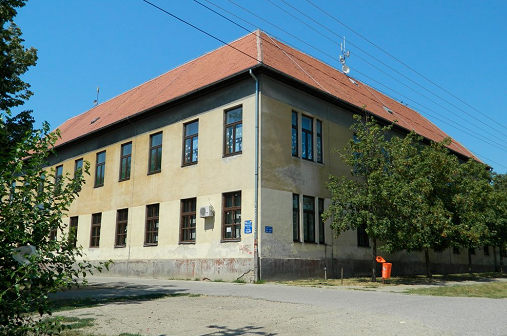
School Gotse Delchev, built in 1912

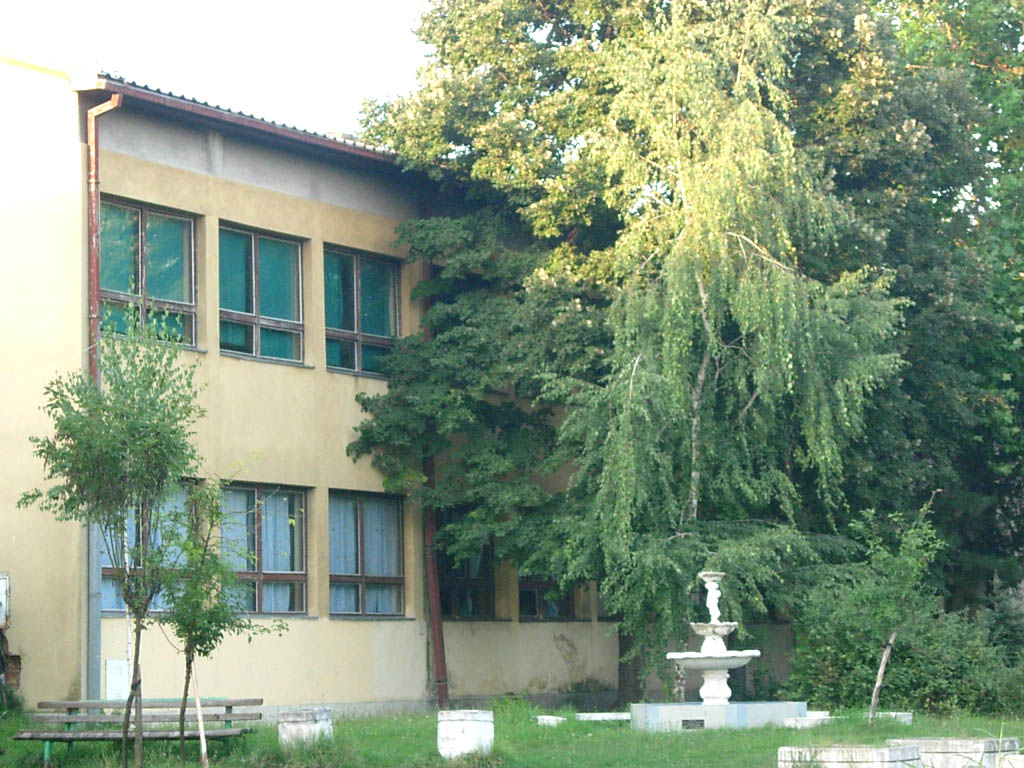
Part of modern school extension with sports hall, built 1960–1961; snapshot of 2006

== See also ==
- List of cities, towns and villages in Vojvodina
- List of places in Serbia
- Macedonians in Serbia
