= Predrag Ginculj =

Serbian politician

Predrag Ginculj (Serbian Cyrillic: Предраг Гинцуљ; born 1983) is a politician in Serbia. He has served in the Assembly of Vojvodina since 2012 as a member of the Serbian Progressive Party.

== Private career ==
Ginculj is a master economist. He is from the village of Sefkerin in Opovo.

== Politician ==
=== Provincial politics ===
Ginculj entered political life as a member of the far-right Serbian Radical Party, running as a party candidate for the Opovo constituency seat in the 2008 Vojvodina provincial election. He finished in third place. The Radical Party split later in the same year, with several members joining the more moderate Progressive Party under the leadership of Tomislav Nikolić and Aleksandar Vučić. Ginculj sided with the Progressives.

He ran for the Opovo constituency seat again in the 2012 provincial election and this time won a narrow victory in the second round. The election was won by the Democratic Party and its allies, and Ginculj served in opposition for the next four years. At the time of his first election, he was the youngest member of the assembly.

Vojvodina switched to a system of full proportional representation prior to the 2016 provincial election. Ginculj was given the forty-eighth position on the Progressive Party's electoral list in that election and won a second term when the list won a majority victory with sixty-three out of 120 mandates. He subsequently received the sixty-second position on the party's Aleksandar Vučić — For Our Children list in the 2020 provincial election and was again elected when the list won an increased majority with seventy-six mandates.

Ginculj was chosen as chair of the assembly committee for budget and finance in October 2020. He is also a member of the committee on cooperation with the Serbian national assembly in the exercise of the competencies of the province.

=== Municipal politics ===
Ginculj became president of the Sefkerin village council at the age of twenty-three.

He has served a number of terms in the Opovo municipal assembly. He was given the fourth position on the Progressive Party's list in the 2016 Serbian local elections and received a mandate when the list won a majority victory with fourteen out of twenty-five seats. In the 2020 local elections, he received the third position and was re-elected when the list won an increased majority with nineteen mandates.

== Electoral record ==
=== Provincial (Vojvodina) ===
2012 Vojvodina assembly election Opovo (constituency seat) - First and Second Rounds
| Predrag Ginculj | Let's Get Vojvodina Moving (Affiliation: Serbian Progressive Party) | 1,062 | 21.38 | 2,005 | 50.39 |
| Jovan Rackov | Choice for a Better Vojvodina | 1,524 | 30.68 | 1,974 | 49.61 |
| Milan Bunčić | Socialist Party of Serbia–Party of United Pensioners of Serbia–United Serbia–Social Democratic Party of Serbia | 711 | 14.31 | | |
| Danica Mijailović | Citizens' Group | 554 | 11.15 | | |
| Veljko Josić | League of Social Democrats of Vojvodina | 517 | 10.41 | | |
| Jelena Nedeljkov | Democratic Party of Serbia | 372 | 7.49 | | |
| Dragan Milakov | Serbian Radical Party | 228 | 4.59 | | |
| Total valid votes | | 4,968 | 100 | 3,979 | 100 |

2008 Vojvodina provincial election: Opovo
| Candidate | Party | First round | | Second round | |
| Candidate | Party | Votes | % | Votes | % |
|---|---|---|---|---|---|
| Milorad Soldatović | Citizens' Group: Milorad Soldatović | 1,650 | 30.93 | 1,862 | 52.47 |
| Jovan Rackov | For a European Serbia–Boris Tadić | 1,056 | 19.80 | 1,687 | 47.53 |
| Predrag Ginculj | Serbian Radical Party | 925 | 17.34 | | |
| Boško Nikolić | Citizens' Group: I Love the Banat Country | 511 | 9.58 | | |
| Jovica Jožica | Together for Vojvodina–Nenad Čanak | 393 | 7.37 | | |
| Stevan Milićev | Democratic Party of Serbia–New Serbia–Vojislav Koštunica | 337 | 6.32 | | |
| Nedeljko Stašević | Socialist Party of Serbia (SPS) and Party of United Pensioners of Serbia (PUPS) | 257 | 4.82 | | |
| Stevan Nikolić | Liberal Democratic Party | 205 | 3.84 | | |
| Total | | 5,334 | 100.00 | 3,549 | 100.00 |
| Valid votes | | 5,334 | 93.76 | 3,549 | 98.04 |
| Invalid/blank votes | | 355 | 6.24 | 71 | 1.96 |
| Total votes | | 5,689 | 100.00 | 3,620 | 100.00 |
