= Milorad Soldatović =

Serbian politician

Milorad Soldatović (Serbian Cyrillic: Милорад Солдатовић; born 1964) is a politician in Serbia. He was the mayor of Opovo for most of the period from 2004 to 2015 and also served in the Assembly of Vojvodina from 2008 to 2012. Originally a member of the Strength of Serbia Movement (Pokret Snaga Srbije, PSS), he was later an independent.

== Private career ==
Soldatović is a graduated agricultural engineer.

== Politician ==
Serbia briefly introduced the direct election of mayors in the 2004 local electoral cycle. Soldatović ran as the PSS's candidate in Opovo and was narrowly elected in the second round of voting. He later appeared on the party's electoral list in the 2007 Serbian parliamentary election; the list did not cross the electoral threshold to win assembly representation. Following this election, he left the PSS and started a local political movement in Opovo.

The direct election of mayors was abandoned with the 2008 local elections; since this time, Serbian mayors have been chosen by the elected members of city and municipal assemblies. Soldatović led his movement to victory in Opovo in this cycle and was selected for a second term as mayor. He was also elected to the Vojvodina assembly for Opovo's constituency seat in the concurrent 2008 provincial election and appeared on Branislav Lečić's list in the 2008 Serbian parliamentary election; the latter list did not cross the electoral threshold.

Vojvodina's conflict-of-interest laws were reformed during Soldatović's term in the provincial assembly, and he resigned as mayor in late 2011 to avoid continuing to serve in a dual mandate. He did not seek re-election to the provincial assembly in 2012 but instead returned to municipal politics, leading his own list again in Opovo in the 2012 local elections. The list, which was by this time aligned with the Democratic Party (Demokratska stranka, DS), won a plurality victory, and Soldatović returned to the mayor's office.

There was a change in Opovo's government in September 2015; Soldatović resigned as was replaced by a delegate from the Serbian Progressive Party (Srpska napredna stranka, SNS). He once again led his own list in the 2016 local elections; the list won eight seats, finishing second against the Progressives, and he served in opposition. He was not a candidate in 2020.

== Electoral record ==
=== Provincial (Vojvodina) ===
2008 Vojvodina provincial election: Opovo
Candidate	Party	First round		Second round	
Candidate	Party	Votes	%	Votes	%
Milorad Soldatović	Citizens' Group: Milorad Soldatović	1,650	30.93	1,862	52.47
Jovan Rackov	For a European Serbia–Boris Tadić	1,056	19.80	1,687	47.53
Predrag Ginculj	Serbian Radical Party	925	17.34		
Boško Nikolić	Citizens' Group: I Love the Banat Country	511	9.58		
Jovica Jožica	Together for Vojvodina–Nenad Čanak	393	7.37		
Stevan Milićev	Democratic Party of Serbia–New Serbia–Vojislav Koštunica	337	6.32		
Nedeljko Stašević	Socialist Party of Serbia (SPS) and Party of United Pensioners of Serbia (PUPS)	257	4.82		
Stevan Nikolić	Liberal Democratic Party	205	3.84		
Total		5,334	100.00	3,549	100.00
Valid votes		5,334	93.76	3,549	98.04
Invalid/blank votes		355	6.24	71	1.96
Total votes		5,689	100.00	3,620	100.00

=== Local (Opovo) ===
2004 Municipality of Opovo local election: Mayor of Opovo (second round results)
Candidate	Party	Votes	%
Milorad Soldatović (incumbent)	Strength of Serbia Movement	1,590	51.03
		1,526	48.97
Total		3,116	100.00
