= Sakule =

Sakule Сакуле
- Village (Selo)
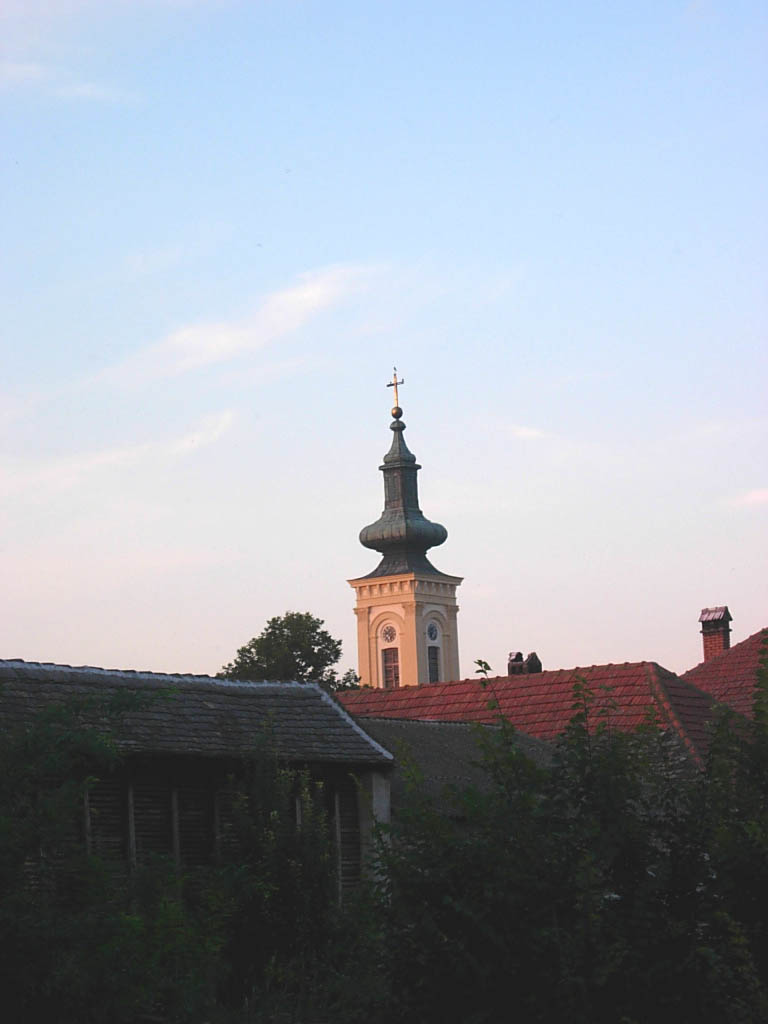
- The Orthodox Church

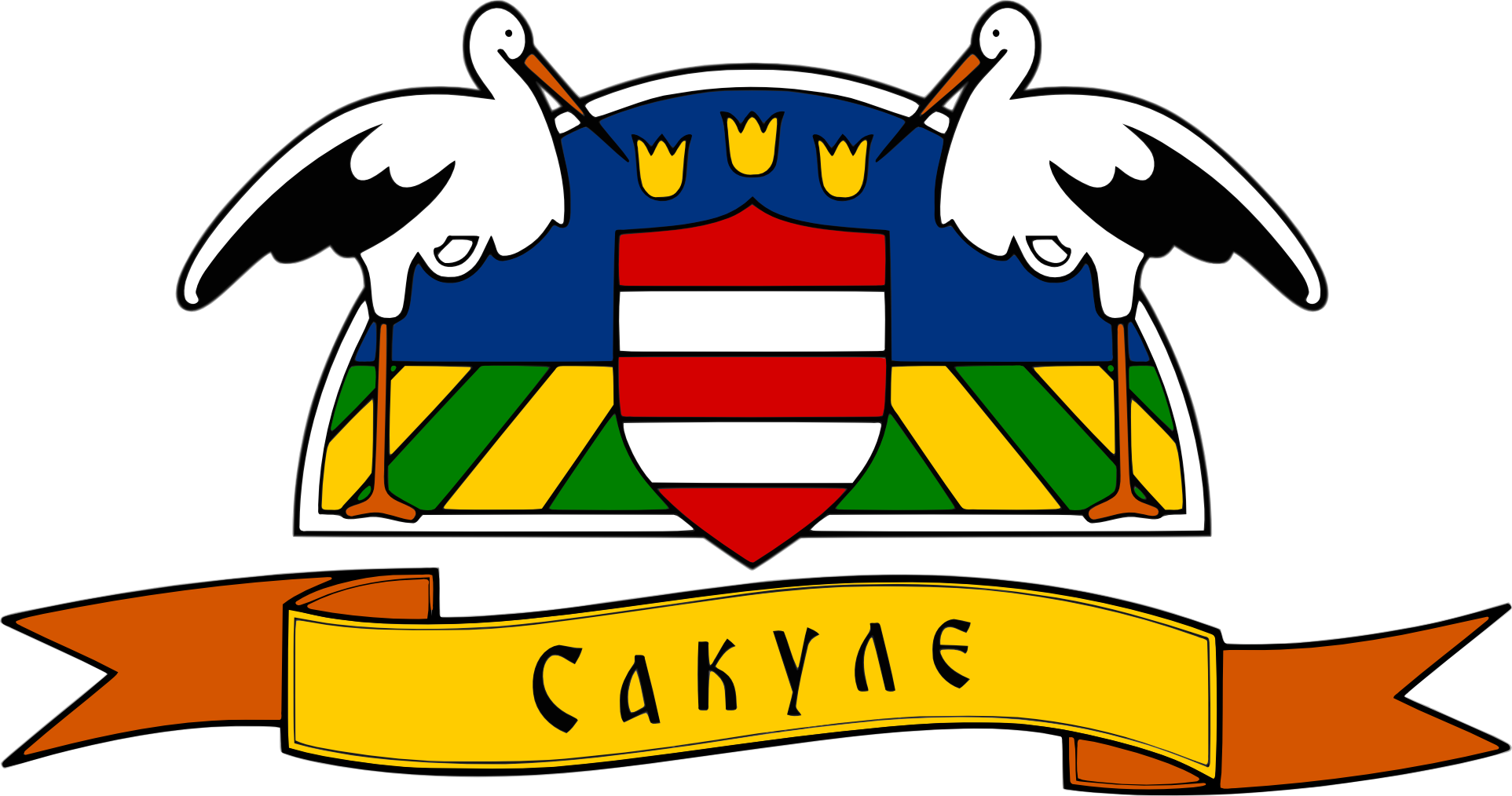
- Coat of arms

- Location of Sakule within Serbia Sakule (Serbia) Sakule (Europe)
- Coordinates: 45°08′28″N 20°29′05″E
- Country: Serbia
- Province: Vojvodina
- District: South Banat
- Municipality: Opovo
- Elevation: 69 m (226 ft)

Population (2002)
  - Sakule: 2,048
- Time zone: UTC+1 (CET)
  - Summer (DST): UTC+2 (CEST)
- Postal code: 26206
- Area code: +381(0)13
- Car plates: PA

Sakule (Serbian Cyrillic: Сакуле) is a village in Serbia. It is situated in the Opovo municipality, in the South Banat District, Vojvodina province. The village has a Serb ethnic majority (94,82%) and it has a population of 2,048 people (2002 census).

== Historical population ==
- 1961: 2,725
- 1971: 2,525
- 1981: 2,280
- 1991: 2,200

== See also ==
- List of places in Serbia
- List of cities, towns and villages in Vojvodina
