= Clemens Höslinger =

Austrian librarian and music historian

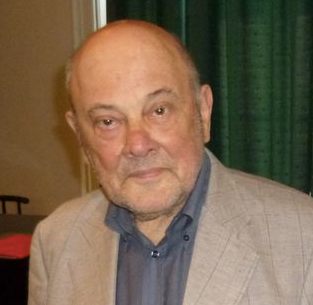
Clemens Höslinger (2013)

Clemens Höslinger (pseudonyme: Christian Herbst) (born 15 September 1933) is an Austrian historian, music journalist and librarian.

== Life ==
Born in Vienna, Höslinger, younger brother of the Augustiner-Chorherren Norbert Höslinger, first completed his studies at the Universität für Musik und darstellende Kunst Wien. Afterwards he worked from 1959 to 1993 as librarian for the National Archives of Austria.

Höslinger became known primarily as a music critic in magazines and daily newspapers in the German-speaking world. He has also presented historical sound recordings at numerous radio stations. His areas of research and publication primarily concern the history of Viennese music and theatre.

Höslinger is vice president of the association Wiener Opernarchiv, previously RISM-Österreich.

== Writings ==
- Musik im Burgtheater. Eine Ausstellung zum 200jährigen Jubiläum des Burgtheaters. sterreichische Nationalbibliothek, VIenna 1976 (Katalog der Musiksammlung der österreichischen Nationalbibliothek, Institut für Österreichische Musikdokumentation)
- Die Wiener Oper zu Zeit des jungen Schönberg.
- Musik-Index zur Wiener Zeitschrift für Kunst, Literatur, Theater und Mode 1816-1848. Musikverlag Katzbichler, Munich/Salzburg 1980.
- Giacomo Puccini. Mit Selbstzeugnissen und Bilddokumenten. (Rowohlts Monographien. Bd. 325). Rowohlt, Reinbek 1984; 8th edition 2008, ISBN 978-3-499-50325-2.
- Book Review: Jacques Offenbachs Hoffmanns Erzählungen. Konzeption, Dokumentation. (Thurnauer Schriften zum Musiktheater. Band 9)
- Goldstaub der Archive | Wilhelm Jahn | Eine verborgene Glanzzeit der Wiener Hofoper 1881–1897 (2025), ISBN 978-3-200-10699-4 Online: Zenodo

== Literature ==
- Herbst, Christian. In Lutz Hagestedt (ed.): Deutsches Literatur-Lexikon. Das 20. Jahrhundert. Vol. 17, De Gruyter, Berlin/Boston 2011, p. 2008 (online).
