= Marina Toman =

Serbian politician

Marina Toman (Serbian Cyrillic: Марина Томан; born 6 June 1972) is a politician in Serbia. She was a member of the National Assembly of Serbia from 2007 to 2012, serving with the far-right Serbian Radical Party. She subsequently left the Radicals and joined the Serbian Progressive Party. Toman is now the commissioner for the South Banat District in Vojvodina.

== Early life and career ==
Toman was born in Kovačica, Vojvodina, in what was then the Socialist Republic of Serbia in the Socialist Federal Republic of Yugoslavia. She graduated from the University of Belgrade Faculty of Economics in 1999.

== Politician ==
=== Member of the National Assembly ===
Toman received the twenty-fourth position on the Radical Party's electoral list in the 2007 Serbian parliamentary election and was awarded a mandate after the list won eighty-one seats. (From 2000 to 2011, Serbian parliamentary mandates were awarded to sponsoring parties or coalitions rather than to individual candidates, and it was common practice for mandates to be assigned out of numerical order. Toman's numerical position on the list had no official bearing on her election.) While the Radicals won more seats than any other party in this election, they fell well short of a majority and ultimately served in opposition.

She was once again given the twenty-fourth position on the party's list in the 2008 parliamentary election and received a mandate for a second term when the party won seventy-eight seats. While the results of this election were initially inconclusive, a new government was ultimately formed by the Democratic Party, the Socialist Party of Serbia, and other parties, and the Radicals continued in opposition. The party experienced a serious split later in 2008, with several members joining the more moderate Progressive Party. Toman initially remained with the Radicals and was given a more prominent role in the party's activities.

In September 2009, the Serbian government accepted an amendment proposed by Toman for the country's new law on media. This amendment allowed the government to gain the support of a different opposition group (the Liberal Democratic Party) and – while this was not Toman's intention – remain in power after winning a key vote in the assembly.

She was chosen as a Radical Party deputy secretary in April 2010. In September of the same year, she was appointed to the assembly's culture and information committee.

Serbia's electoral system was reformed in 2011, such that mandates were awarded in numerical order to candidates on successful lists. Toman was given the eighteenth position on the Radical Party's list for the 2012 parliamentary election. The party did not cross the electoral threshold to win representation in the assembly.

=== Provincial representative and Commissioner of South Banat ===
Toman subsequently left the Radicals and joined the Progressive Party. She received the tenth position on the party's list for the Assembly of Vojvodina in the 2020 provincial election and was elected when the list won a landslide majority with seventy-six out of 120 mandates.

Her term in the provincial assembly was brief. On 10 September 2020, she was appointed by the government of Serbia as commissioner of the South Banat District. As she could not hold a dual mandate, she resigned from the provincial assembly on 21 September.
