= National Archives of Austria =

Coordinates: 48°11′30.484″N 16°24′44.820″E

Austrian State Archives
- Österreichisches Staatsarchiv
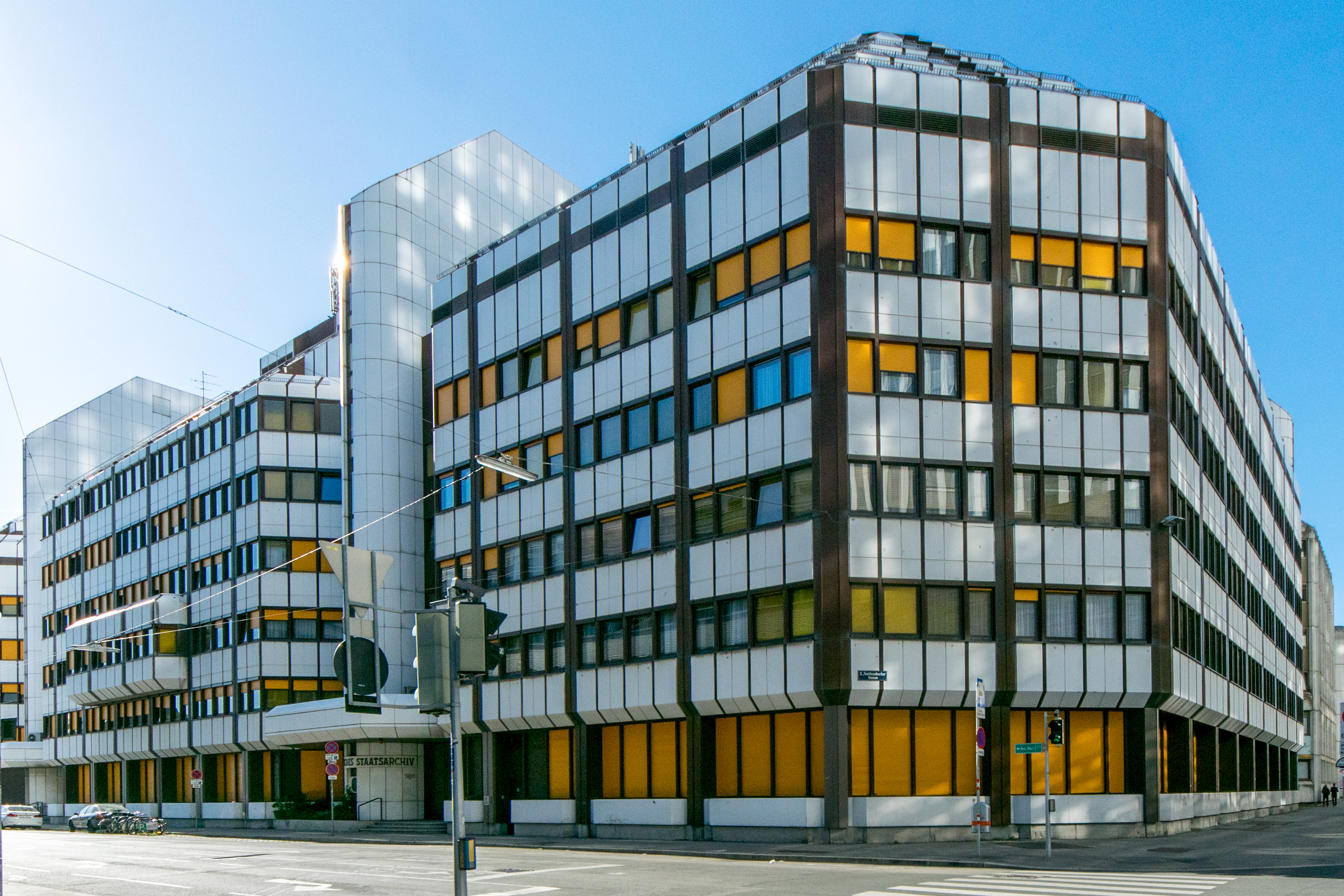
- Former name: Vienna Reich Archive (Reichsarchiv Wien)
- Established: 1749
- Location: Nottendorfer G. 2, 1030 Wien, Austria
- Type: National Archive
- Website: https://www.statearchives.gv.at/

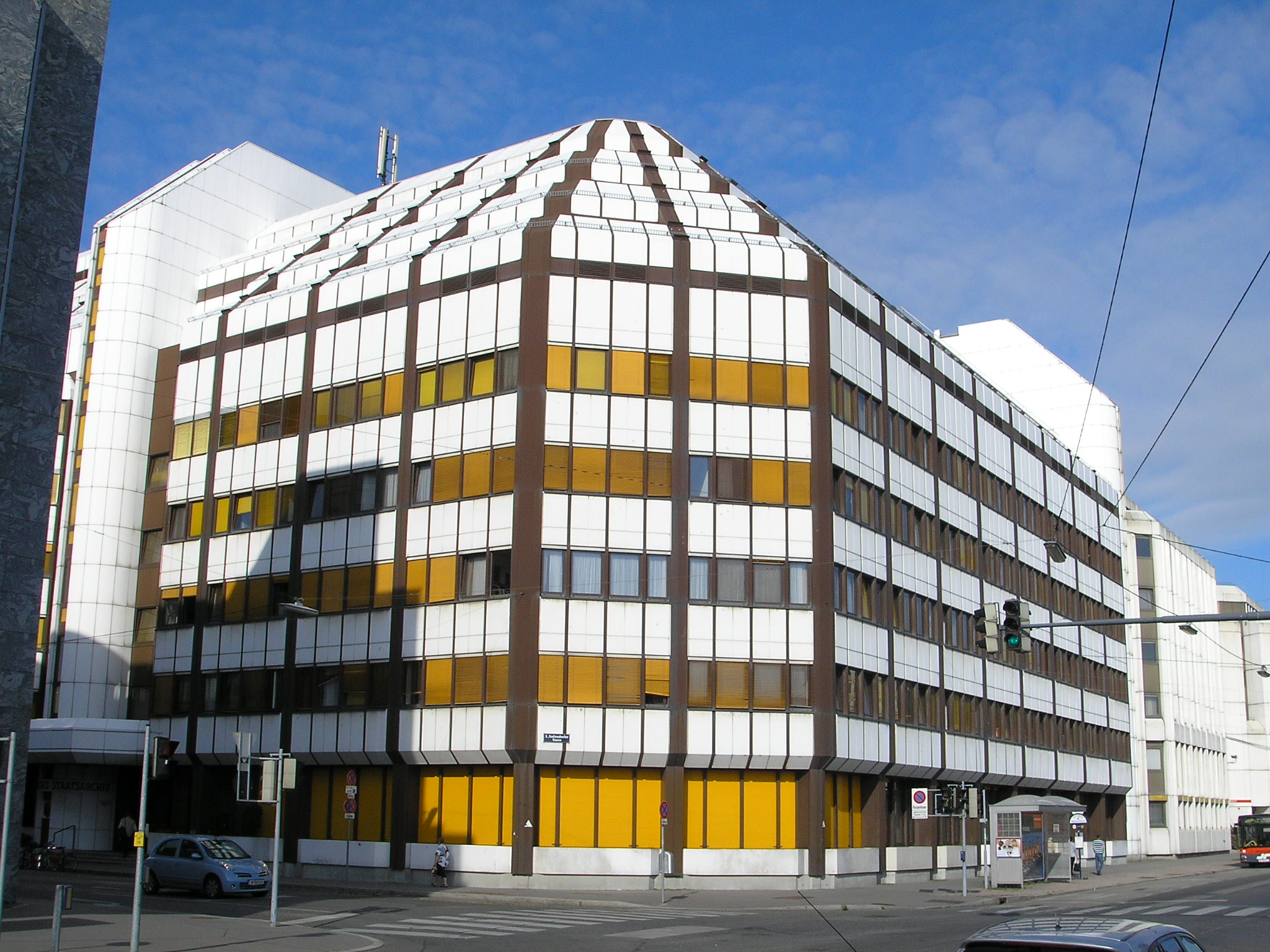
National Archives of Austria

The National Archives of Austria (German: Österreichisches Staatsarchiv), also known

as the Austrian State Archives is the central archive of the republic of Austria, located in Vienna. On the basis of the Austrian Federal Archives Act, it stores the archives of the federal government. The tasks of the Archives are described as follows: recording, taking over, storing, preserving, repairing, organizing, developing, utilizing and making usable federal archive material for research into history and the present, for other research and science, for legislation, jurisdiction, for administration, and the legitimate concerns of citizens. Blocking / Archiving periods of up to 110 years can apply to archive holdings.

== See also ==
- List of national archives
- Austrian National Library
