= Sefkerin =

Sefkerin Сефкерин
- Village (Selo)
- Location of Sefkerin within Serbia Sefkerin (Serbia) Sefkerin (Europe)
- Coordinates: 45°00′10″N 20°28′35″E
- Country: Serbia
- Province: Vojvodina
- District: South Banat
- Municipality: Opovo
- Elevation: 77 m (253 ft)

Population (2011)
  - Sefkerin: 2,522
- Time zone: UTC+1 (CET)
  - Summer (DST): UTC+2 (CEST)
- Postal code: 26203
- Area code: +381(0)13
- Car plates: PA

Sefkerin (Serbian Cyrillic: Сефкерин) is a village in Serbia. It is situated in the Opovo municipality, in the South Banat District, Vojvodina province. The village has a Serb ethnic majority and its population numbering 2,522 people (2011 census).

== Historical population ==
- 1961: 3,028
- 1971: 2,837
- 1981: 2,836
- 1991: 2,717

== See also ==
- List of places in Serbia
- List of cities, towns and villages in Vojvodina
