= Opovo =

Opovo Опово (Serbian)
- Town and municipality
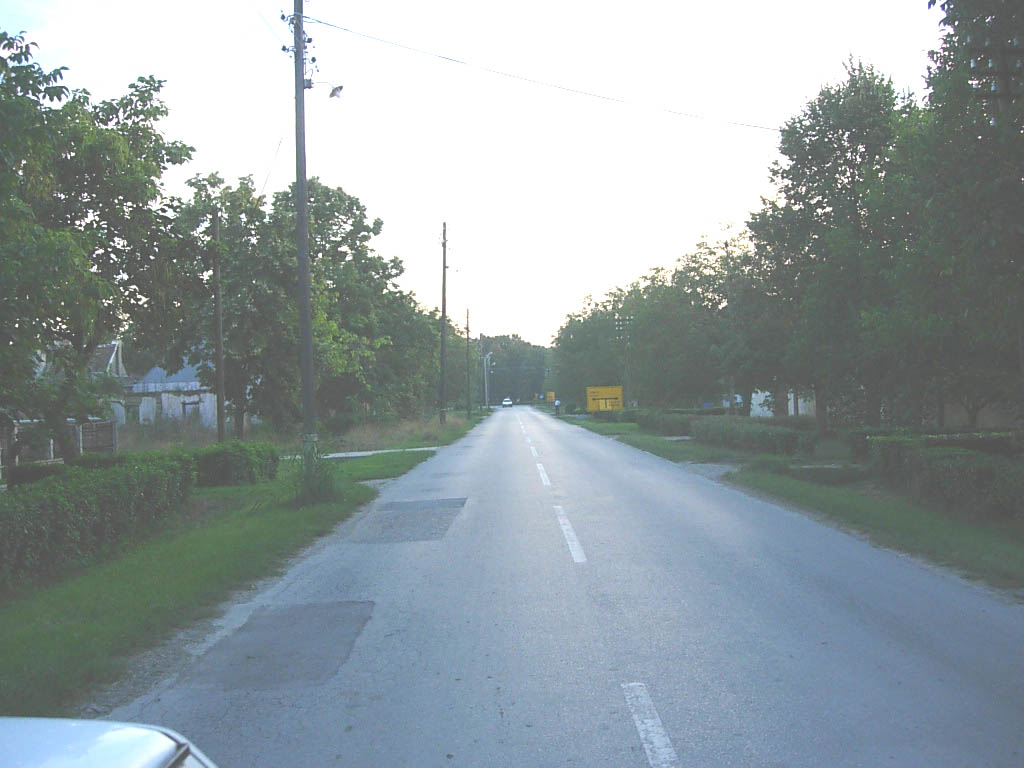
- A street in Opovo

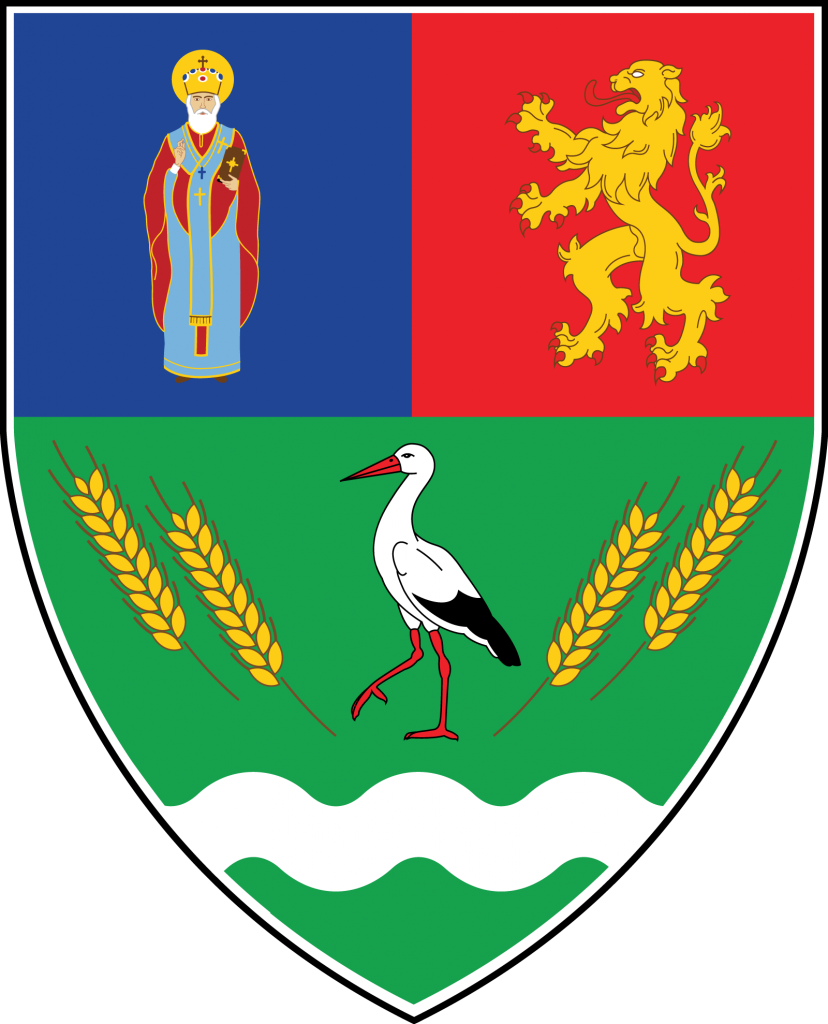
- Coat of arms

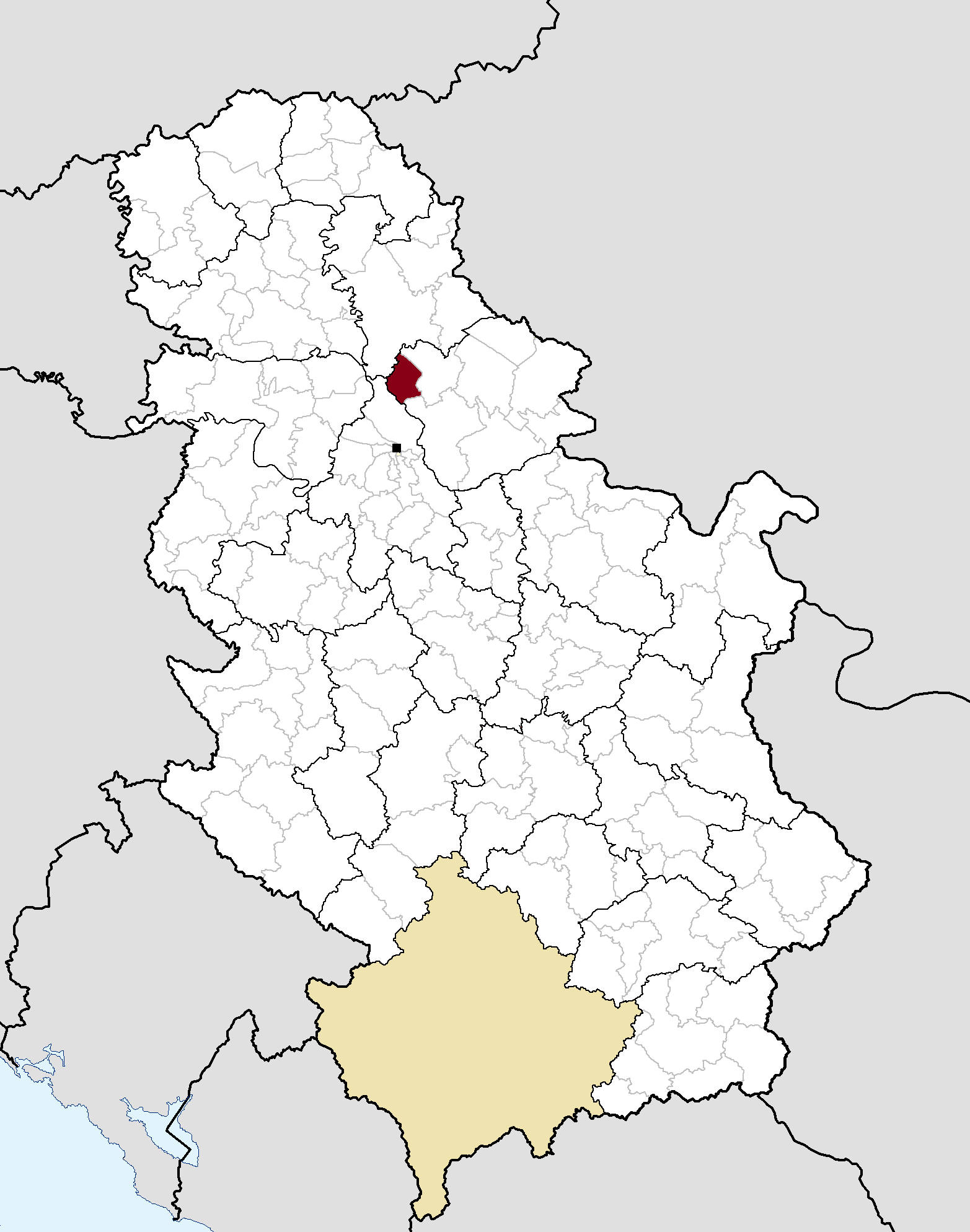
- Location of Opovo within Serbia
- Coordinates: 45°3′7″N 20°25′49″E
- Country: Serbia
- Province: Vojvodina
- District: South Banat

Government
  - Mayor: Anka Simin Damjanov (SNS)
- Elevation: 67 m (220 ft)

Population (2022)
  - Opovo: 4,147
  - Metro: 9,462
- Time zone: UTC+1 (CET)
  - Summer (DST): UTC+2 (CEST)
- Postal code: 26204
- Area code: +381(0)13
- Car plates: PA
- Official languages: Serbian
- Website: www.opovo.org.rs

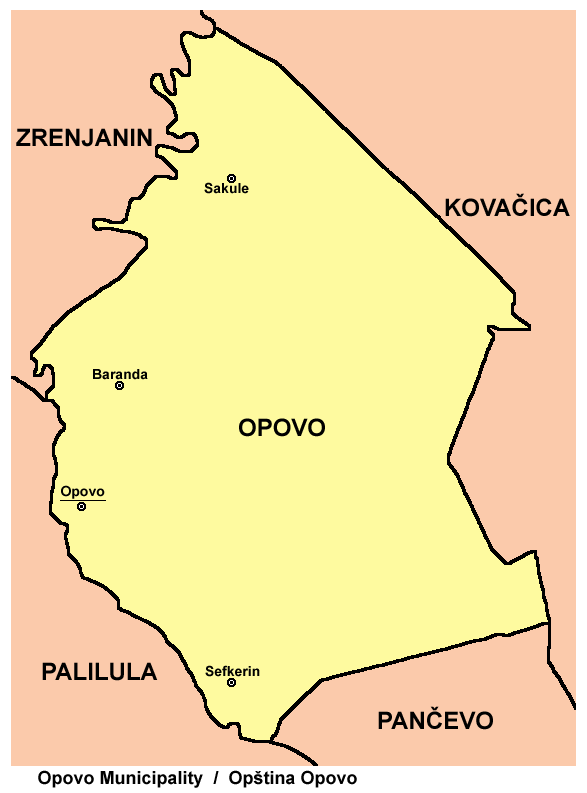
Map of Opovo municipality

Opovo (Serbian Cyrillic: Опово; Hungarian: Ópáva) is a town and municipality located in the South Banat District of the autonomous province of Vojvodina, Serbia. The town has a population of 4,147, while Opovo municipality has 9,462 inhabitants (2022 census).

== Name ==
In Serbian, the town is known as Opovo (Опово), in German as Opowa, in Hungarian as Ópáva, in Croatian as Opovo, in Romanian as Opovo, in Slovak as Opovo, and in Rusyn as Опово.

== History ==
There are traces from Neolithic and Roman periods in this area. An older settlement named Želj existed at this locality during medieval Hungarian and later Ottoman administration. During Hungarian administration it was part of the Kovin county and during Ottoman administration part of the Temeşvar Eyalet. Southern part of modern Opovo is still called Želj by local inhabitants. According to historical sources, modern Opovo was mentioned first in 1672-1690 and it was populated by Serbs. They lived in the houses made from mud. During Ottoman administration, settlement had 27 houses and, after Habsburg conquest, in 1717, it had 64 houses.

During Habsburg administration, Opovo firstly was part of the Banat of Temeswar (until 1751) and then part of the Habsburg Military Frontier. In 1753, Opovo was recorded as ethnic Serb settlement. In the second half of the 18th century (in 1769), Germans and Hungarians settled in Opovo. Serb elementary school in Opovo was opened in 1768, while German school was opened around 1773-4. Construction plan from 1776 predicted that 225 Serb and 60 Catholic houses would be built in the settlement. In 1782, settlement had population of 1,497 people. In the first half of the 19th century (1829–1831), Serbian Orthodox church of Saint Nikolaj was built. In 1848-1849, Opovo was part of autonomous Serbian Vojvodina, but was returned under military administration in 1849. With the abolishment of Military Frontier in Banat (in 1873), Opovo was included into Torontál County, which was part of the Habsburg Kingdom of Hungary and Austria-Hungary. In 1885, new elementary school was elevated in the settlement. In 1910, Serbs were in an absolute majority in Opovo, while other ethnic groups that lived in the settlement included Germans, Croats and Hungarians.

In 1918, following the collapse of Austria-Hungary, Opovo firstly became part of the Kingdom of Serbia and then part of the newly formed Kingdom of Serbs, Croats and Slovenes (later renamed to Yugoslavia). In 1918-1919 it was part of the Banat, Bačka and Baranja region. From 1918 to 1922 Opovo was part of Veliki Bečkerek county, from 1922 to 1929 part of Belgrade oblast, and from 1929 to 1941 part of Danube Banovina. From 1941 to 1944, it was occupied by German Axis troops and was included in the German-administered Banat region, which was part of Serbia. In 1944, Soviet Red Army and Yugoslav partisans expelled Axis troops from the region and Opovo was included into Autonomous Province of Vojvodina within new socialist Yugoslavia. Since 1945, Vojvodina is part of the People's Republic of Serbia. Before World War II, Opovo was part of Kovačica municipality and, after the war, part of Pančevo municipality. Later, separate municipality of Opovo was formed.

== Inhabited places ==
Opovo municipality includes the town of Opovo and the following villages:

- Baranda
- Sakule
- Sefkerin

Opovo is the largest settlement in the municipality.

== Demographics ==
Historical population
Year	Pop.	±% p.a.
1948	12,256	—
1953	12,305	+0.08%
1961	11,848	−0.47%
1971	11,515	−0.28%
1981	11,541	+0.02%
1991	11,384	−0.14%
2002	11,016	−0.30%
2011	10,440	−0.59%
2022	9,462	−0.89%

According to the 2011 census, the total population of the municipality of Opovo was 10,440 inhabitants.

=== Ethnic groups ===
All settlements in the municipality have an ethnic Serb majority. The ethnic composition of the Opovo municipality:

- Serbs (86.3%)
- Croats (2.62%)
- Yugoslavs (2.03%)
- Roma (1.69%)
- Romanians (1.67%)

== Cultural projects ==
Wifi network greenlinks is non-profit wireless network originated in Opovo, member of Srbija Wireless.

== See also ==
- List of places in Serbia
- List of cities, towns and villages in Vojvodina
