= South Banat District =

Administrative district of Serbia

South Banat District Јужнобанатски округ
- Administrative district of Serbia
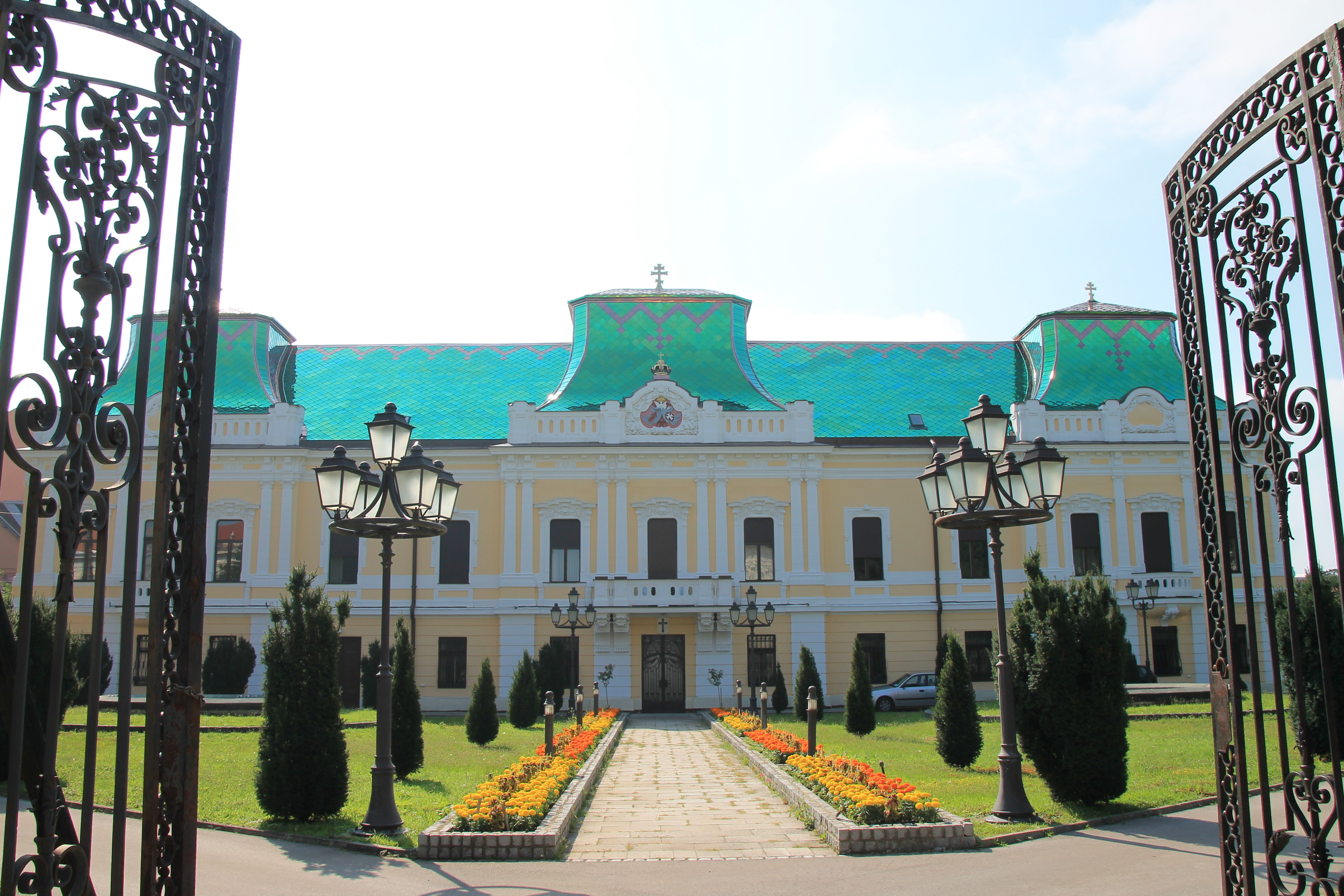
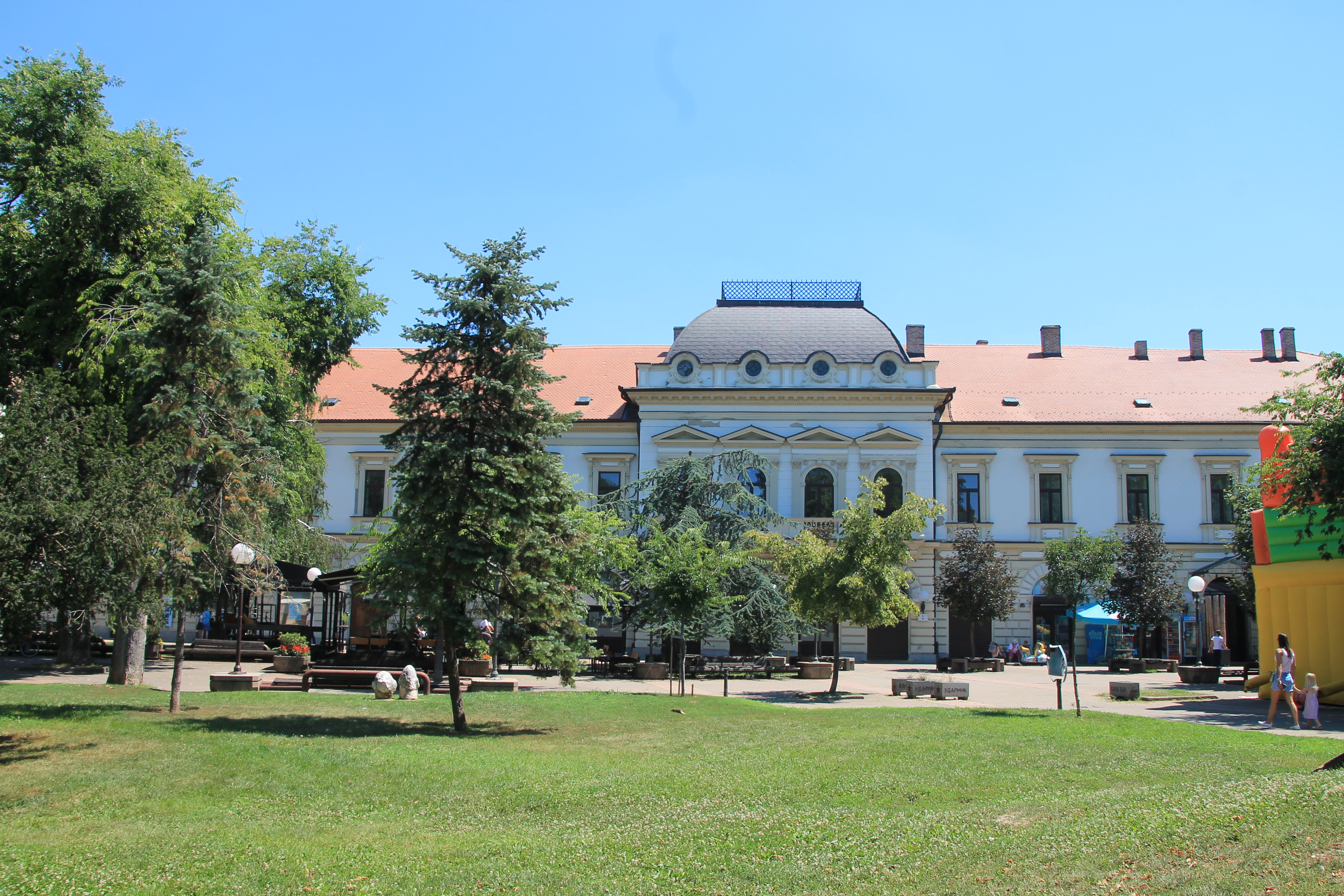
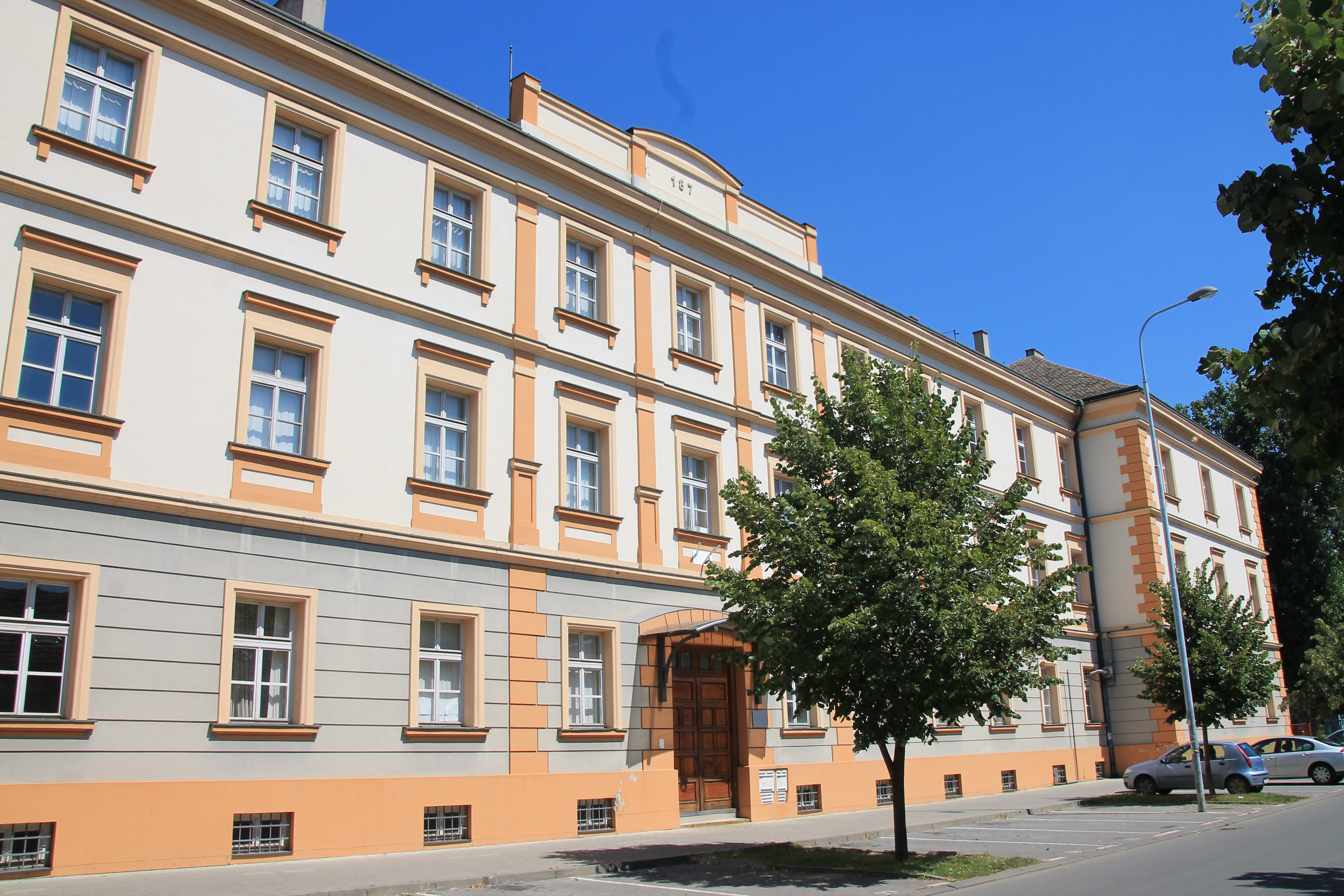
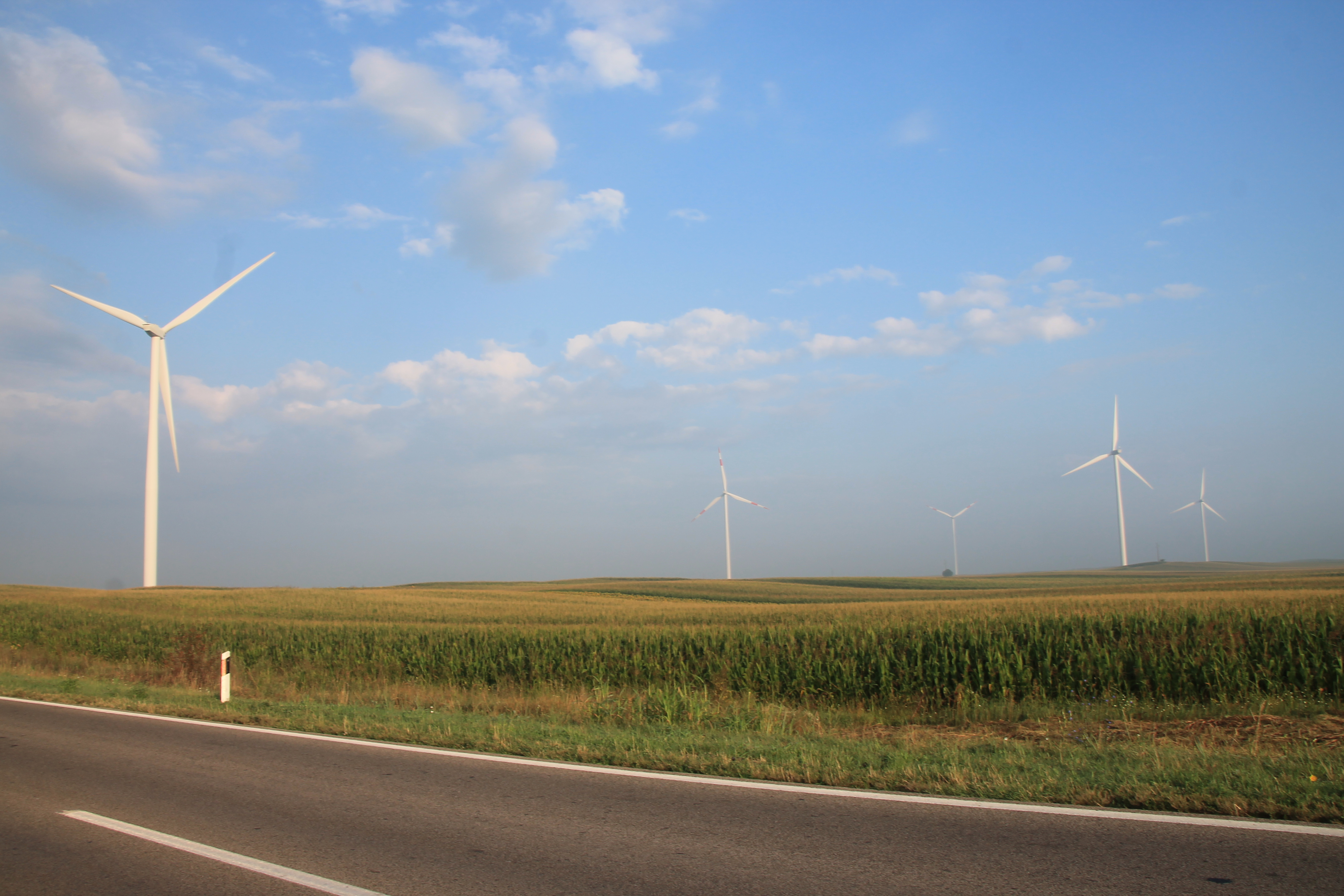
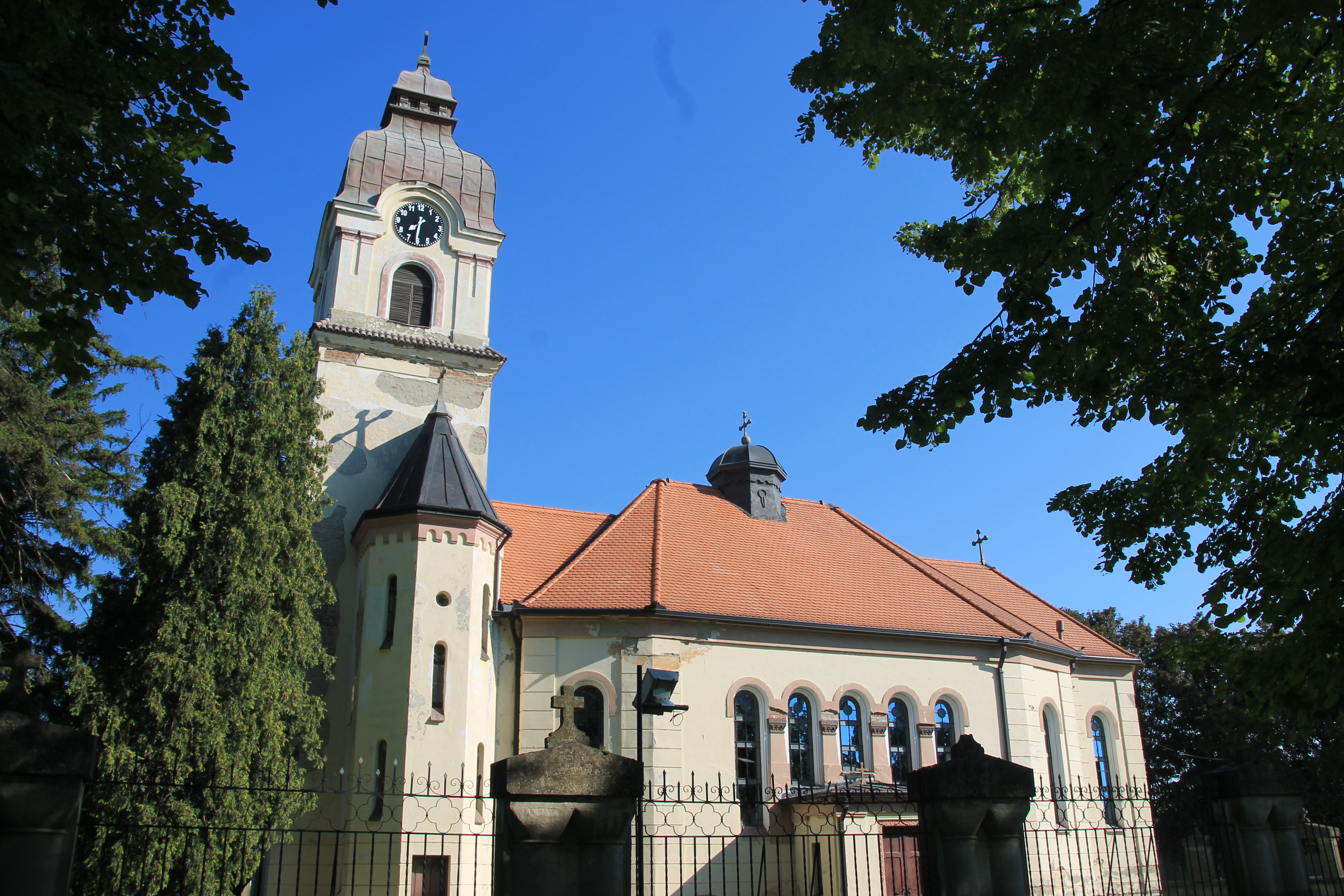
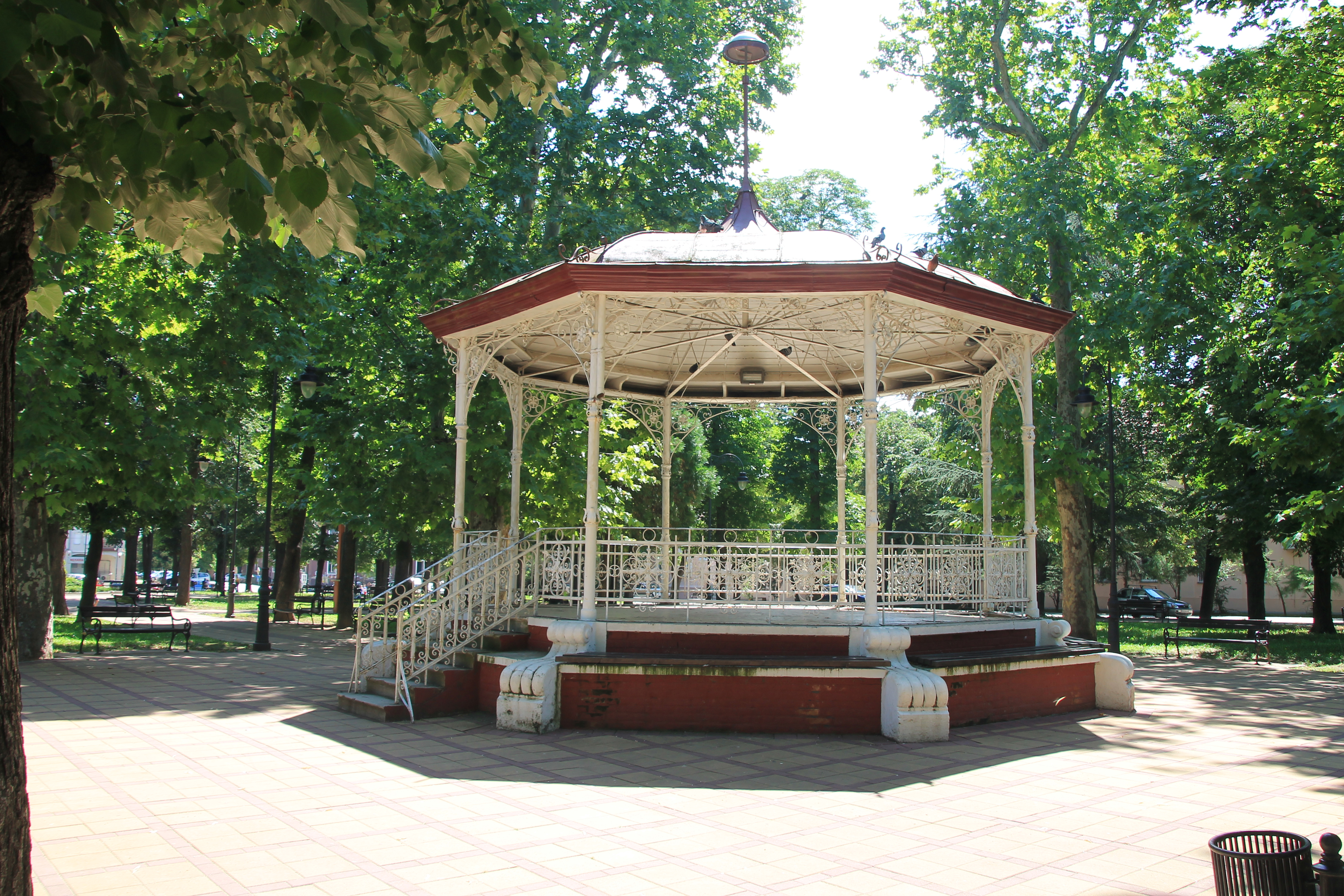
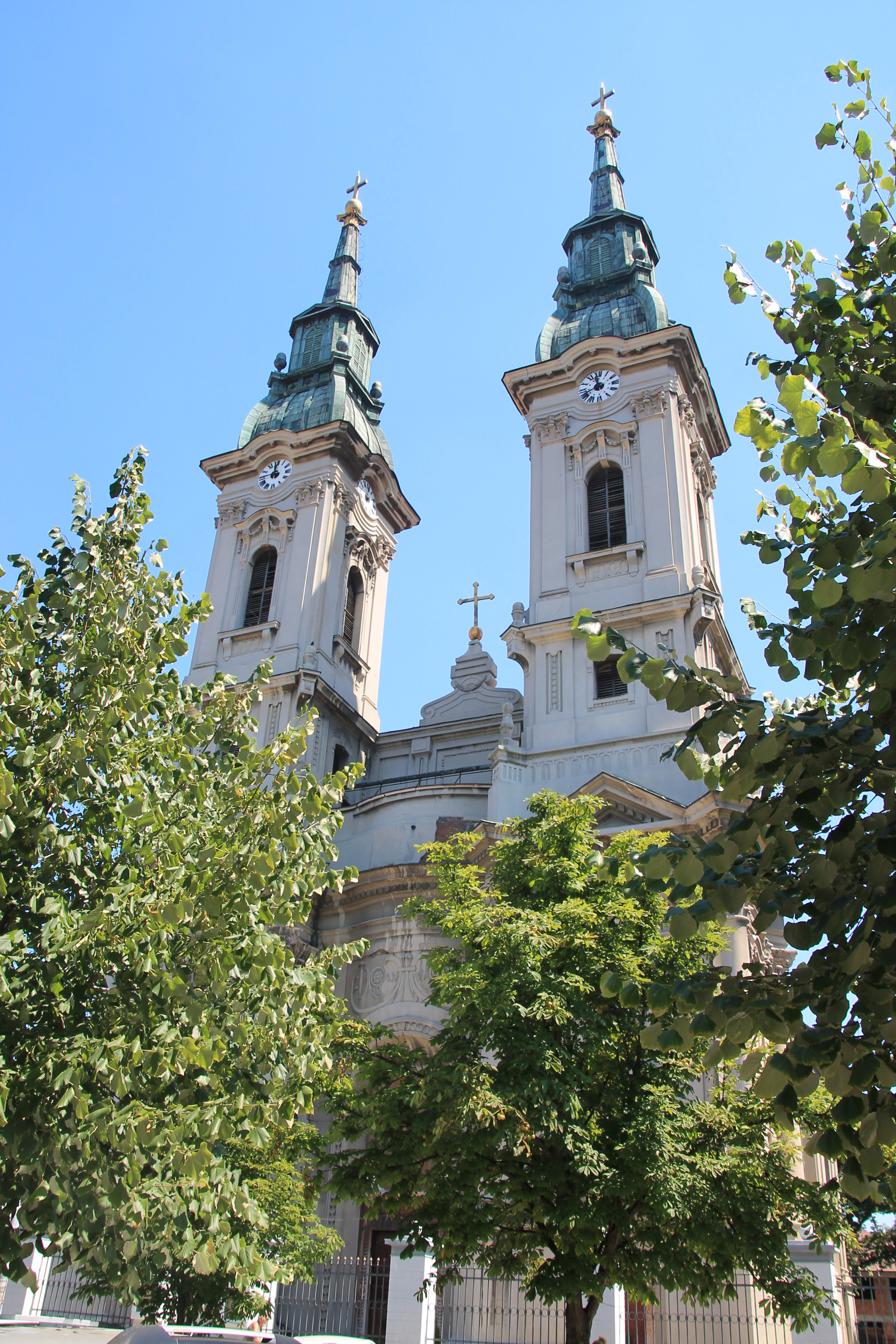
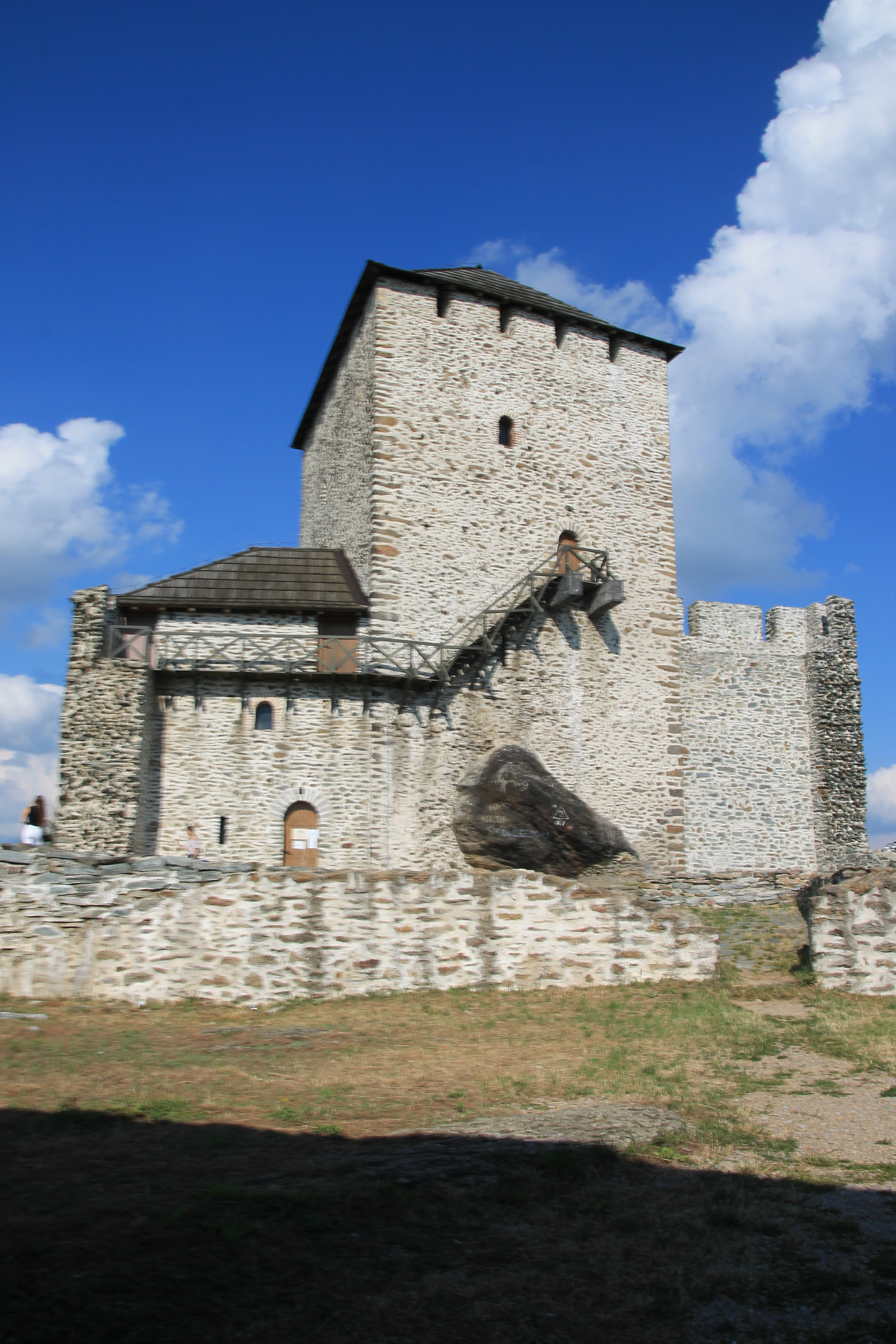
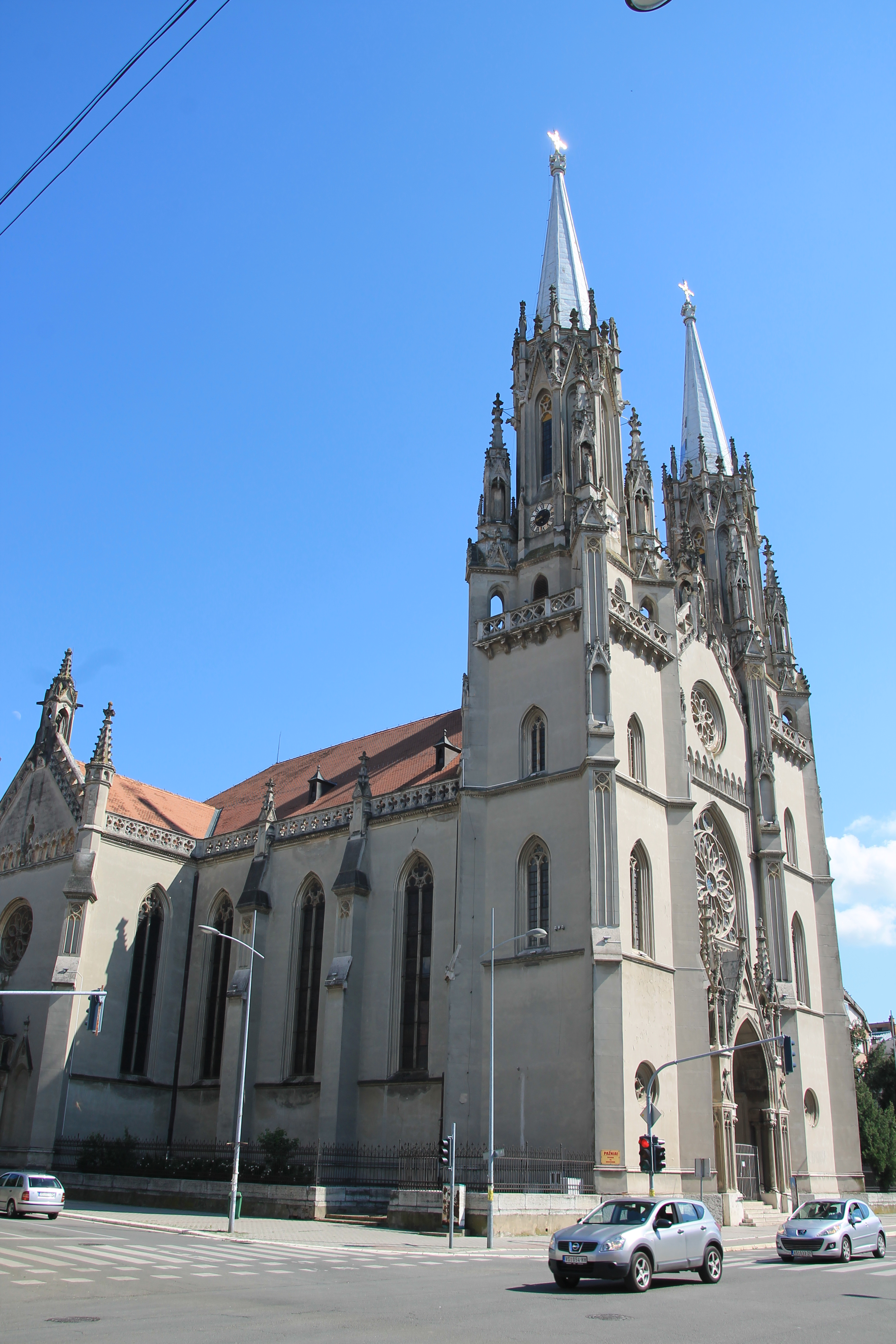
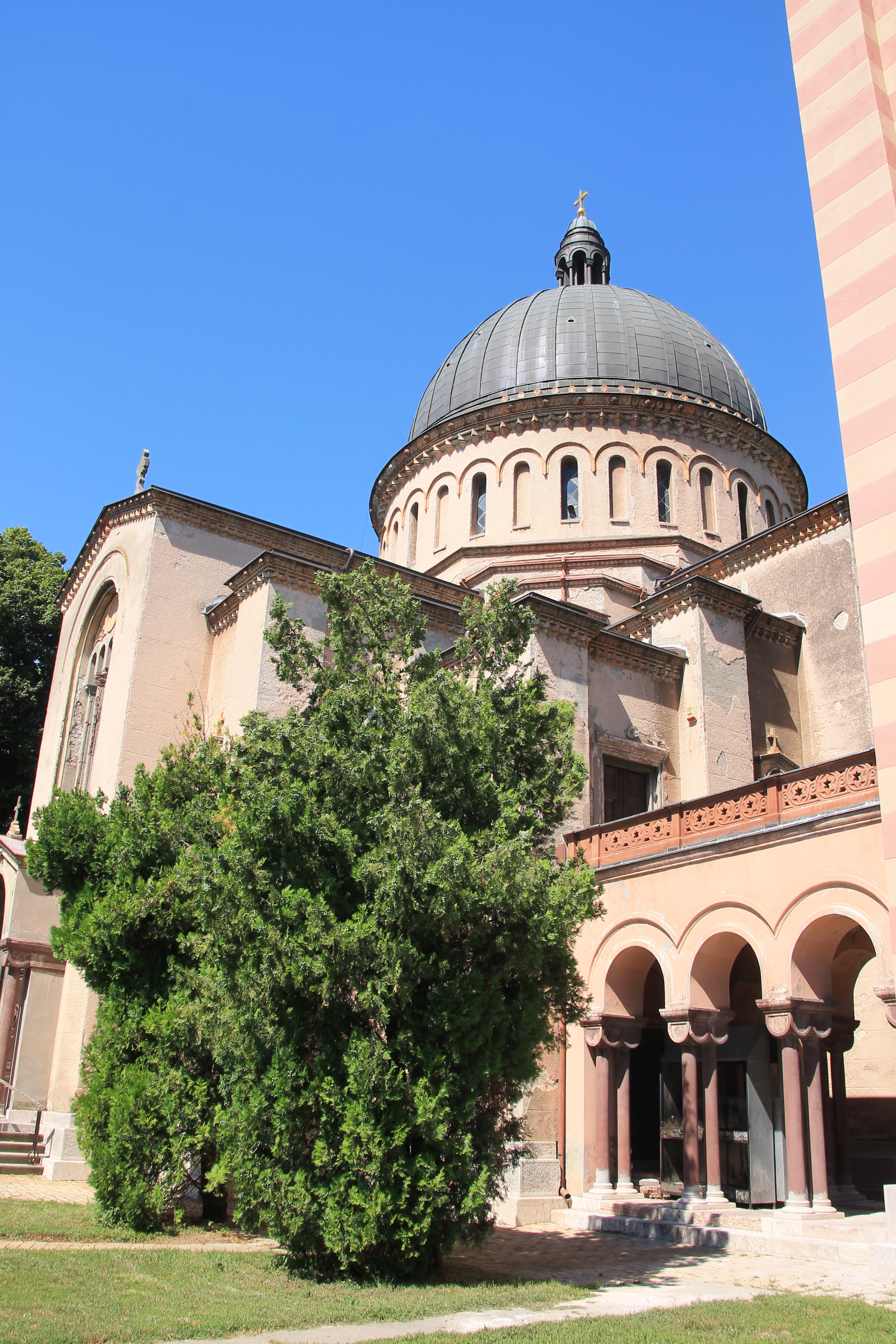
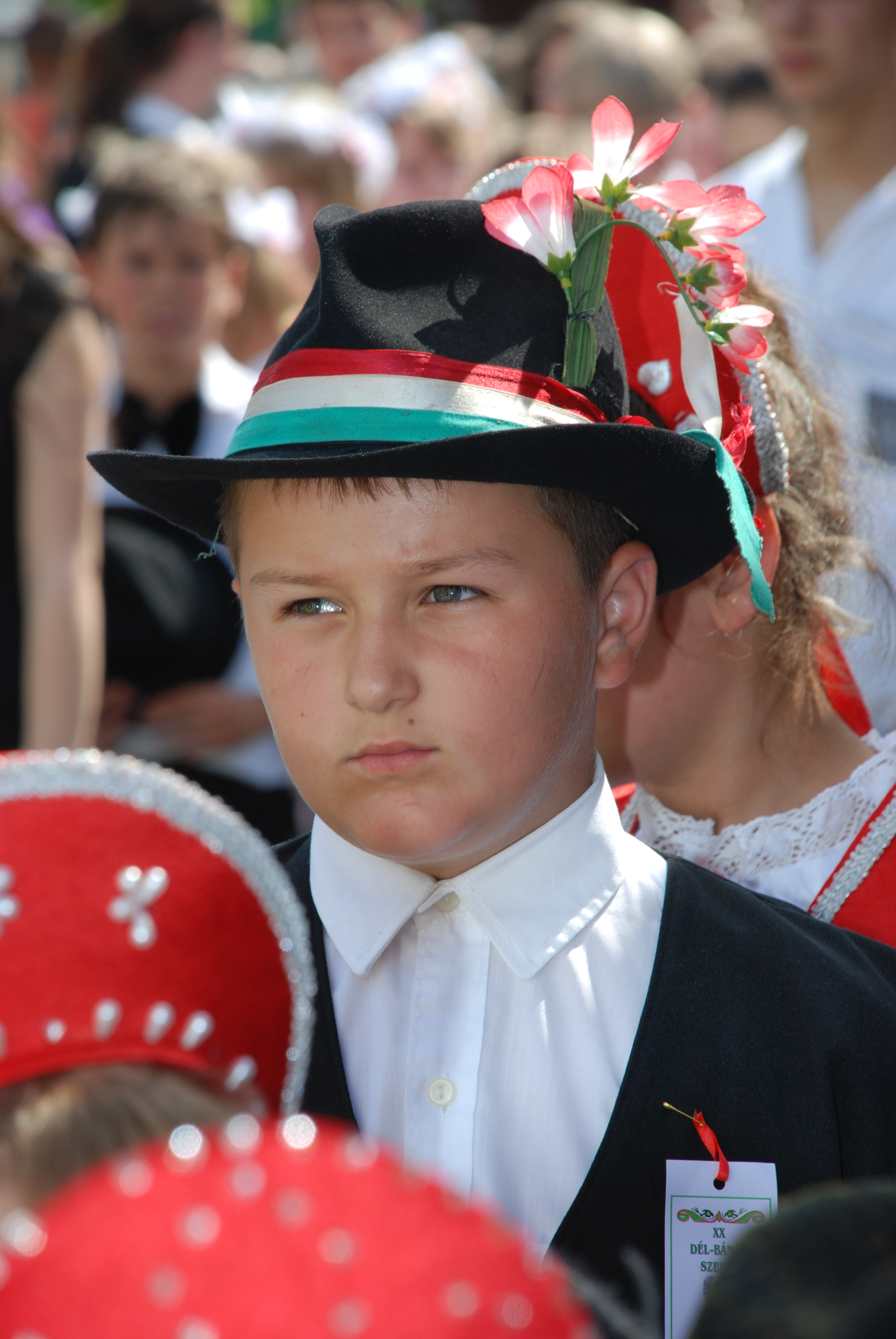
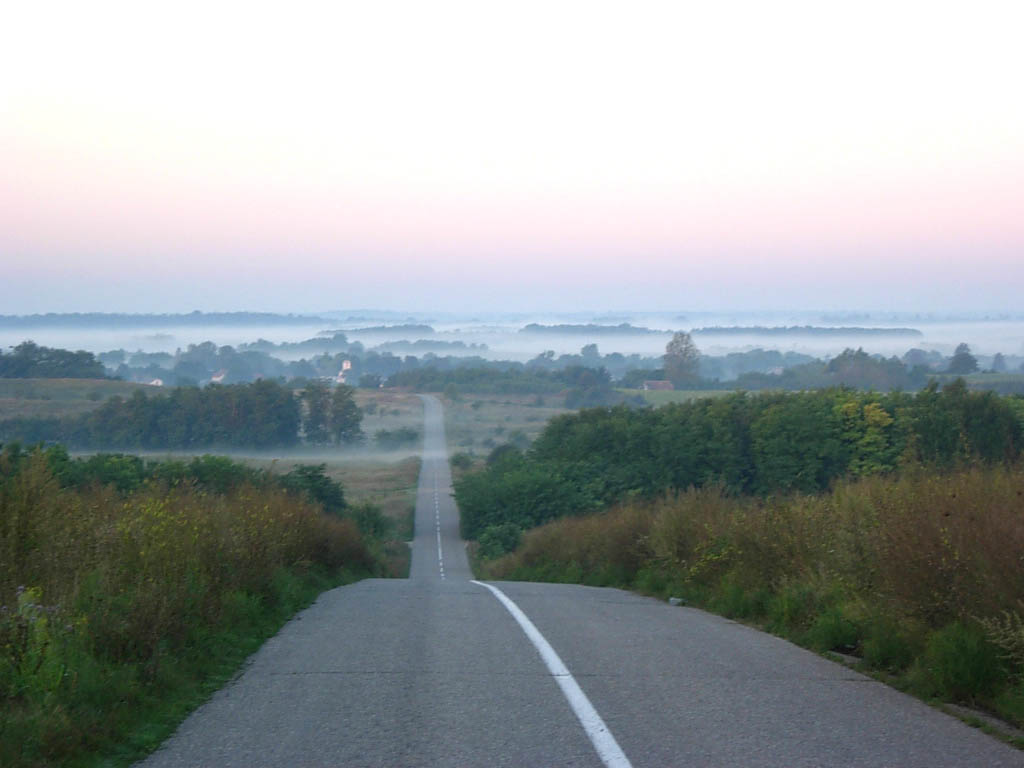
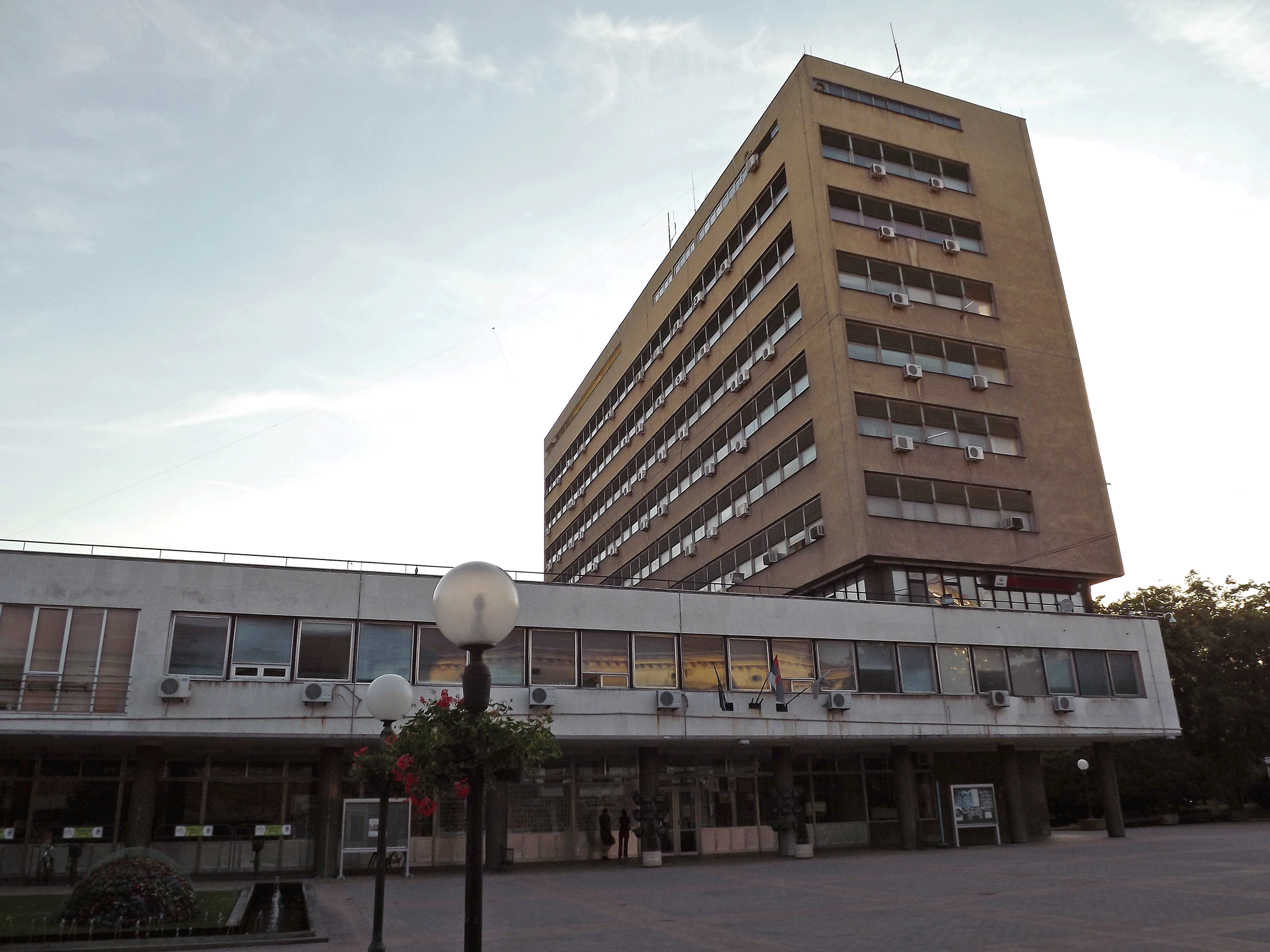
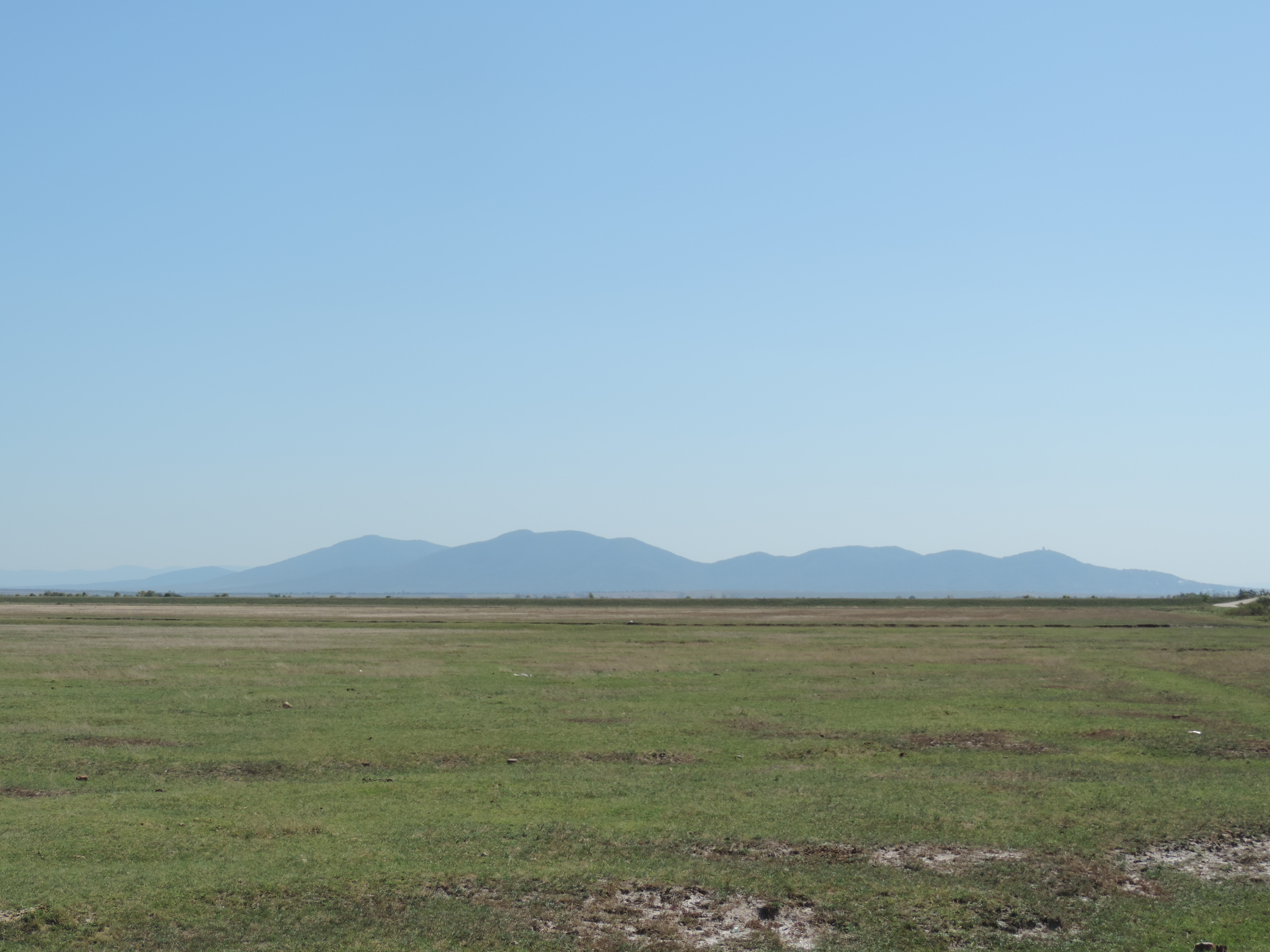
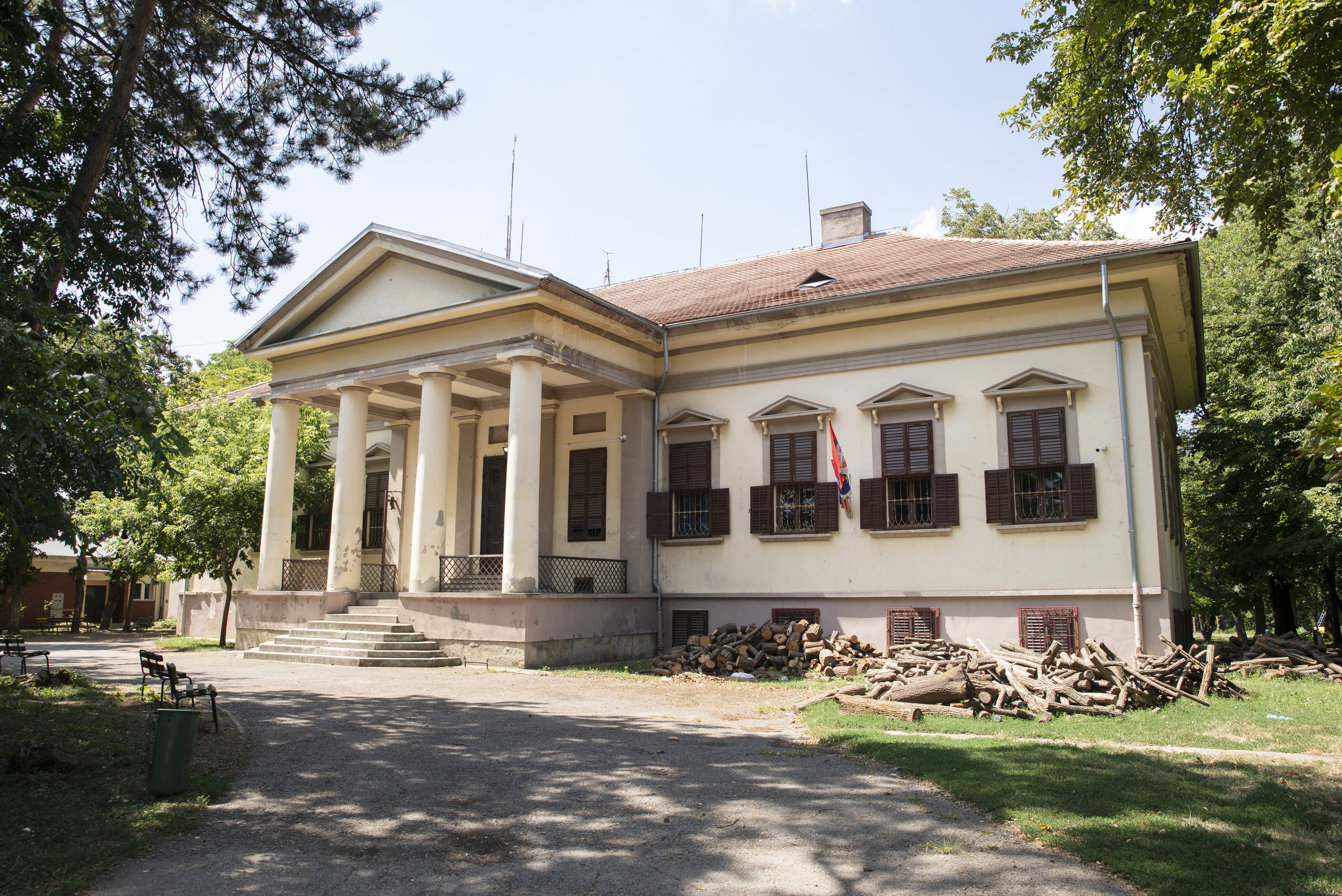
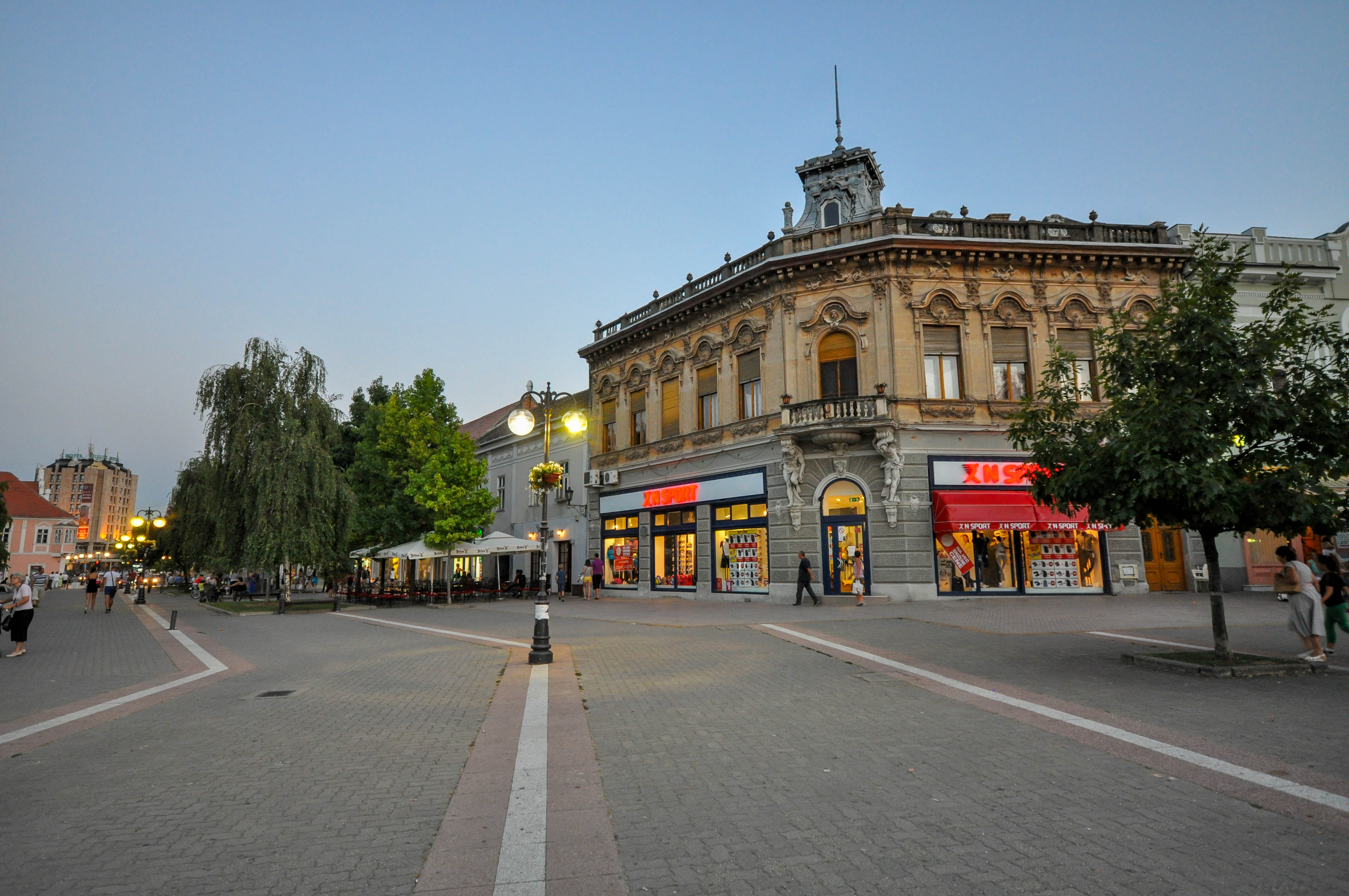
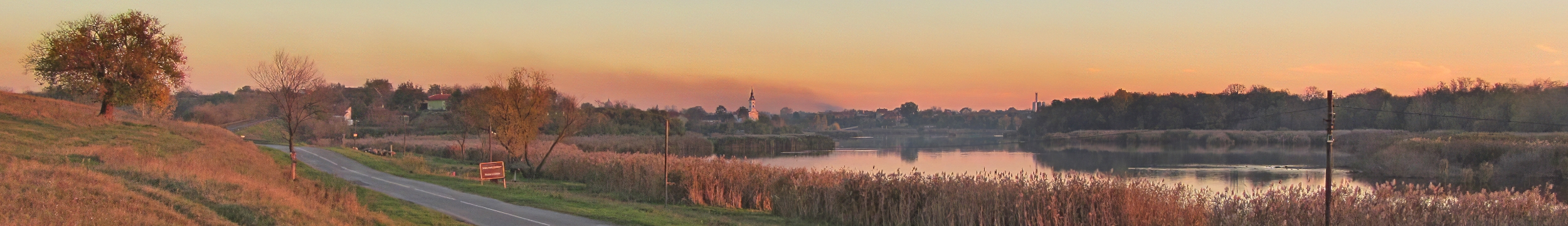
- Images from the South Banat District

- Location of district in Serbia
- Coordinates: 44°52′N 20°38′E
- Country: Serbia
- Province: Vojvodina
- Administrative center: Pančevo

Government
  - Commissioner: Marina Toman

Area
  - Total: 4,245 km^{2} (1,639 sq mi)

Population (2022)
  - Total: 260,244
  - Density: 61.31/km^{2} (158.8/sq mi)
- ISO 3166 code: RS-04
- Municipalities: 8 (2 cities)
- Settlements: 94
- Cities and towns: 10
- Villages: 84
- Website: juznobanatski.okrug.gov.rs

The South Banat District (Serbian: Јужнобанатски округ, romanized: Južnobanatski okrug, pronounced [jûʒnobǎnaːtskiː ôkruːɡ]) is one of administrative districts of Serbia. It lies in the geographical region of Banat. According to the 2022 census, the South Banat District has a population of 260,244 inhabitants. The administrative center of the district is the city of Pančevo.

== Cities and municipalities ==
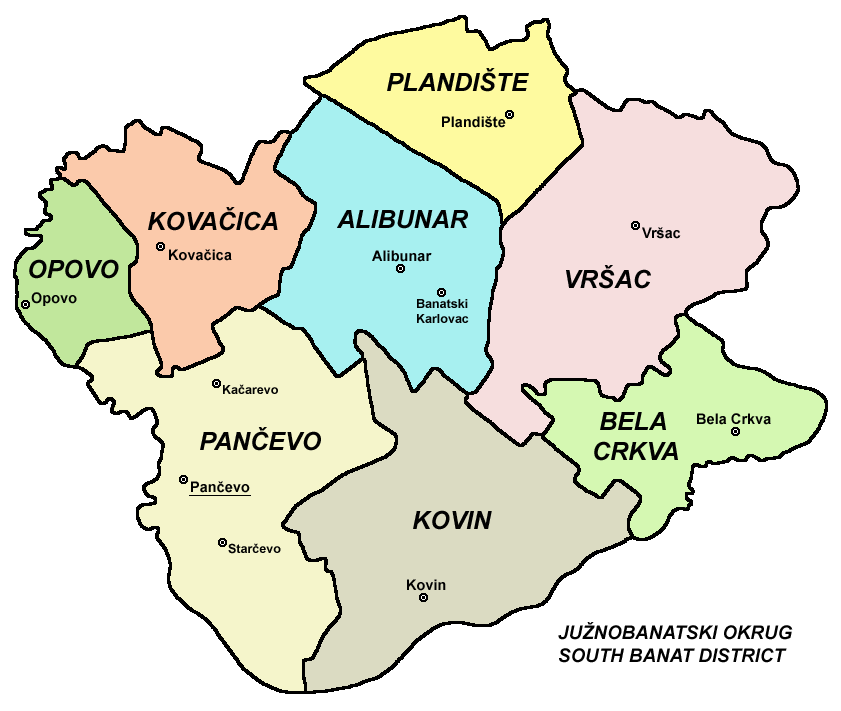
Map of the South Banat District

The South Banat District encompasses the territories of two cities and six municipalities:

- Pančevo (city)
- Vršac (city)
- Alibunar (municipality)
- Bela Crkva (municipality)
- Kovačica (municipality)
- Kovin (municipality)
- Opovo (municipality)
- Plandište (municipality)

== Demographics ==
Historical population
Year	Pop.	±%
1948	279,092	—
1953	291,125	+4.3%
1961	320,187	+10.0%
1971	331,285	+3.5%
1981	340,189	+2.7%
1991	328,428	−3.5%
2002	313,937	−4.4%
2011	293,730	−6.4%
2022	260,244	−11.4%

=== Cities and towns ===
There are three towns with over 10,000 inhabitants:

- Pančevo: 73,401
- Vršac: 31,946
- Kovin: 11,623

=== Ethnic structure ===
Ethnicity	Population	Share
Serbs	187,253	72%
Romanians	13,914	5.3%
Slovaks	11,007	4.2%
Hungarians	8,782	3.3%
Roma	8,421	3.2%
Macedonians	4,374	1.7%
Others	7,851	3%
Undeclared/Unknown	18,642	7.1%

Most of the municipalities in the district have Serb ethnic majority, only the municipality of Kovačica has a relative Slovak ethnic majority (41%).

== See also ==
- Administrative districts of Serbia
- Administrative divisions of Serbia
- Temes County and Torontál County
