= Banat-Brestowatz =

Banat-Brestowatz may refer to:

- Brestovăț, Romania
- Banatski Brestovac, Serbia
