= Bresztovacz =

Bresztovacz or Bresztóvácz may refer to:

- Brestovăț, Romania
- Banatski Brestovac, Serbia
