= Temes-Aga =

Temes-Aga may refer to:

- Brestovăț, Romania
- Banatski Brestovac, Serbia
