= Old bridge (Pločica) =

Old bridge Stari most
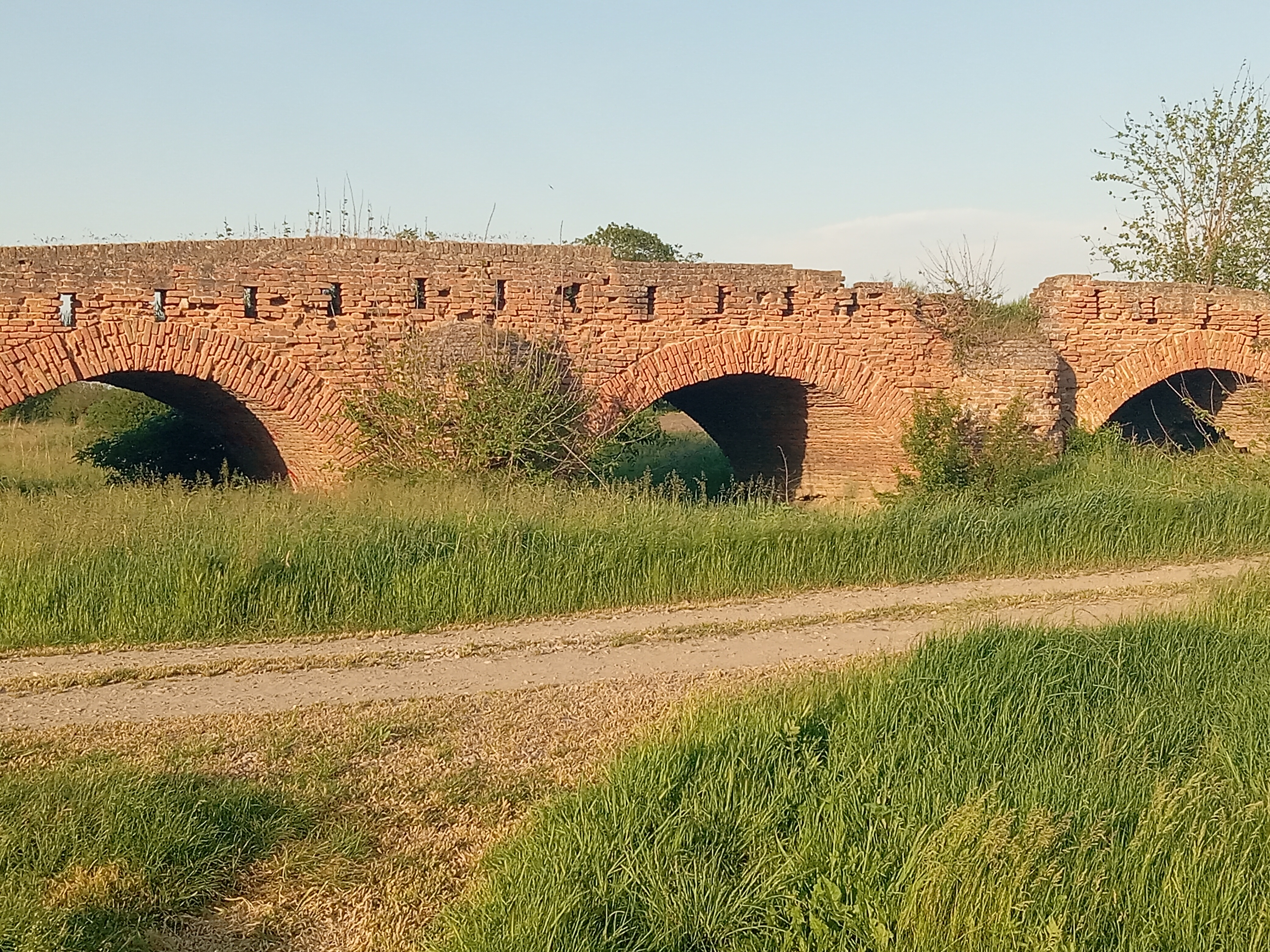
- Old bridge in 2025
- Coordinates: 44°43′05″N 20°53′20″E
- Crossed: Ponjavica river
- Other name(s): Maria Theresa Bridge
- Named for: Lokal name
- Heritage status: yes

Characteristics
- Material: Brick (29 х 14 х 6.5 cm)
- Total length: 23,18 m
- Width: ~ 3 m
- Height: 7,54 m
- No. of spans: 3
- Piers in water: 2
- No. of lanes: 1

History
- Built: 1784—1799
- Destroyed: shortly after WWII

Statistics
- Daily traffic: no traffic

The Old bridge (Serbian Cyrillic: Стари мост), also known as the Maria Theresa Bridge, is located near village Pločica in the municipality of Kovin, Serbia. The bridge fell into disuse after World War II.

== History ==
The Ponjavica River, which originated near Pančevo, previously flowed past Pločica and flowed into the Danube. It is assumed that the bridge was built in the early 18th century, because it is often associated with the era of Austro-Hungarian rule. There is no historical data on who built the bridge. After World War II, the Ponjavica was canalized and drained in this part, Also, one side of the bridge was demolished after the war. and the bridge has lost its previous importance.

It is the only preserved structure of this type in Banat. According to geographer Milan Milovanov, the Old Bridge is not connected with Maria Theresa or Eugene of Savoy, since according to maps it can be concluded that the bridge was built between 1784 and 1799, and in any case during the existence of the Banat Military Frontier (1764 - 1872), not before 1780.

== Features ==
The bridge is made of brick. Its structure is also made up of massive pillars and arches. It is 23.18 meters long and about three meters wide. It is claimed to be of significant architectural, historical and monumental value. It is currently under protection by the Serbian Institute for the Protection of Monuments.

== Gallery ==
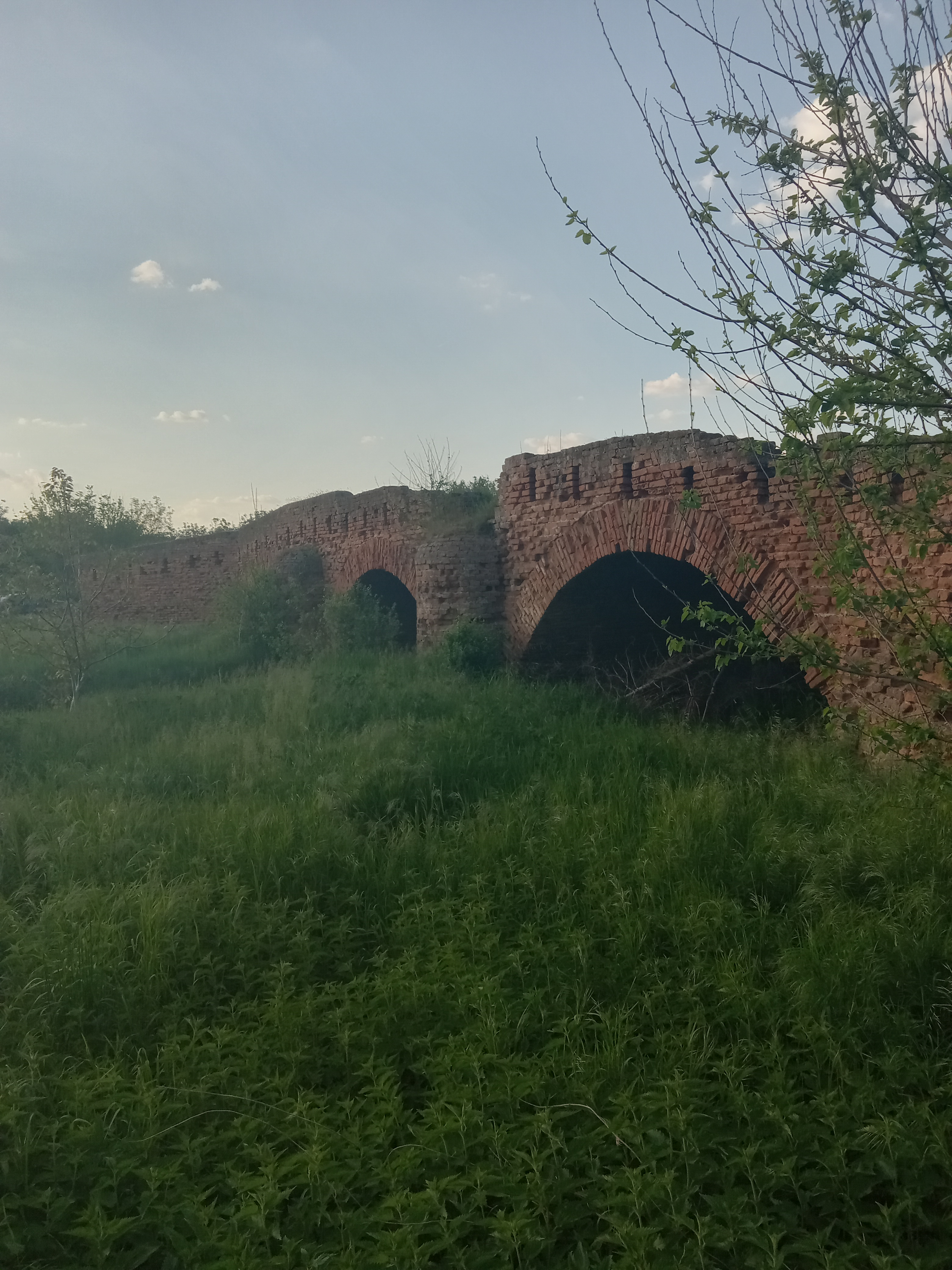

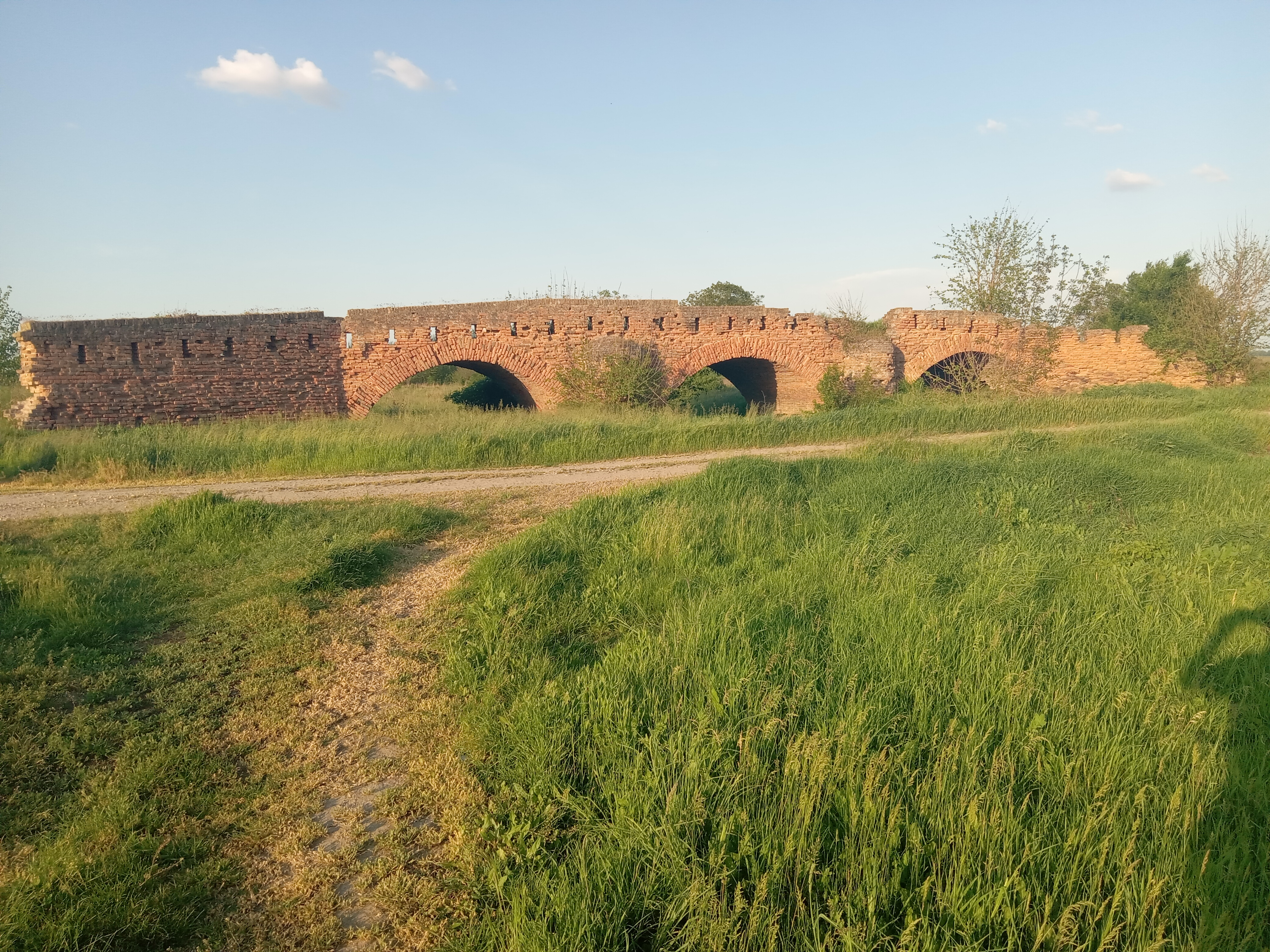

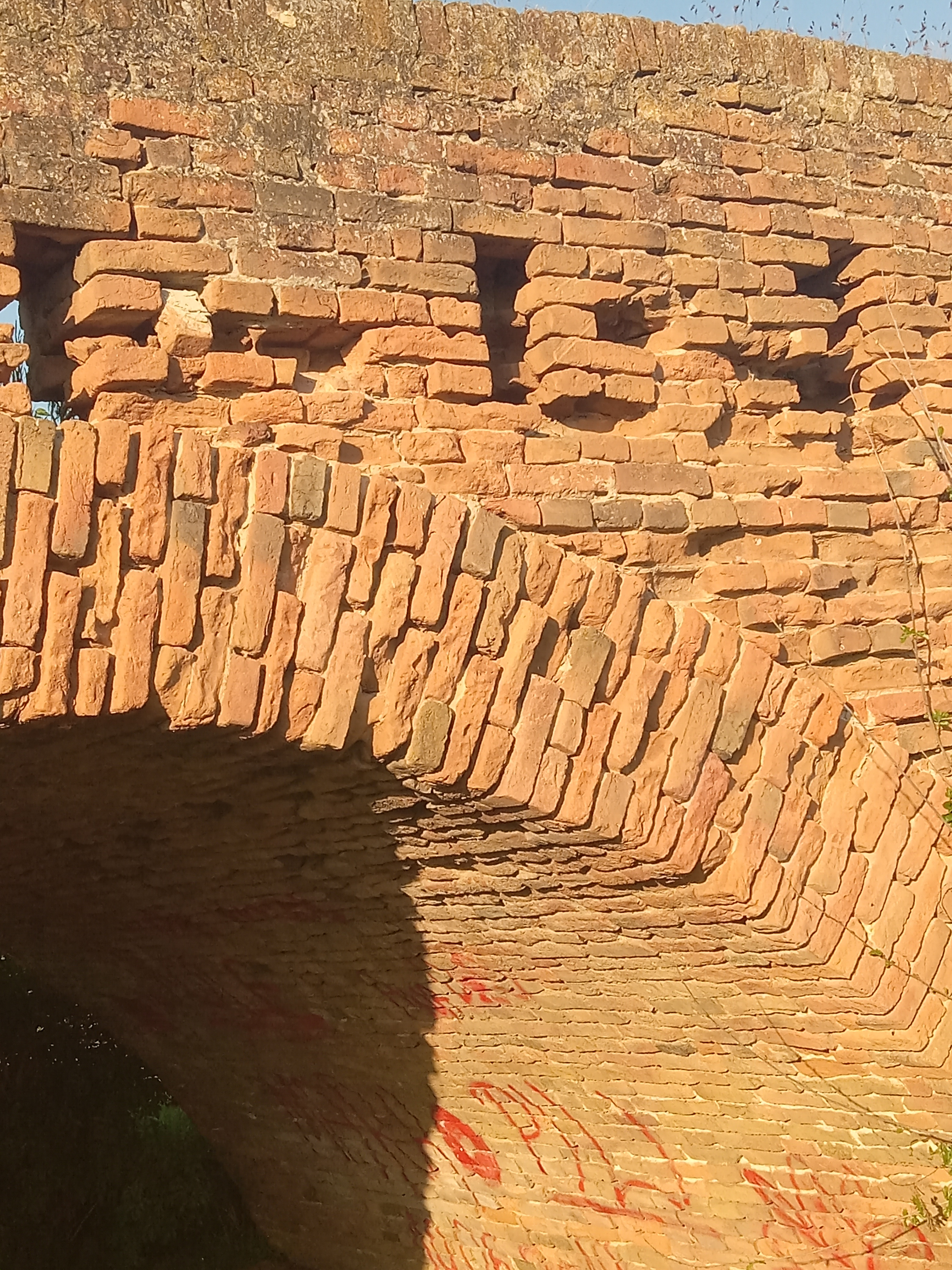

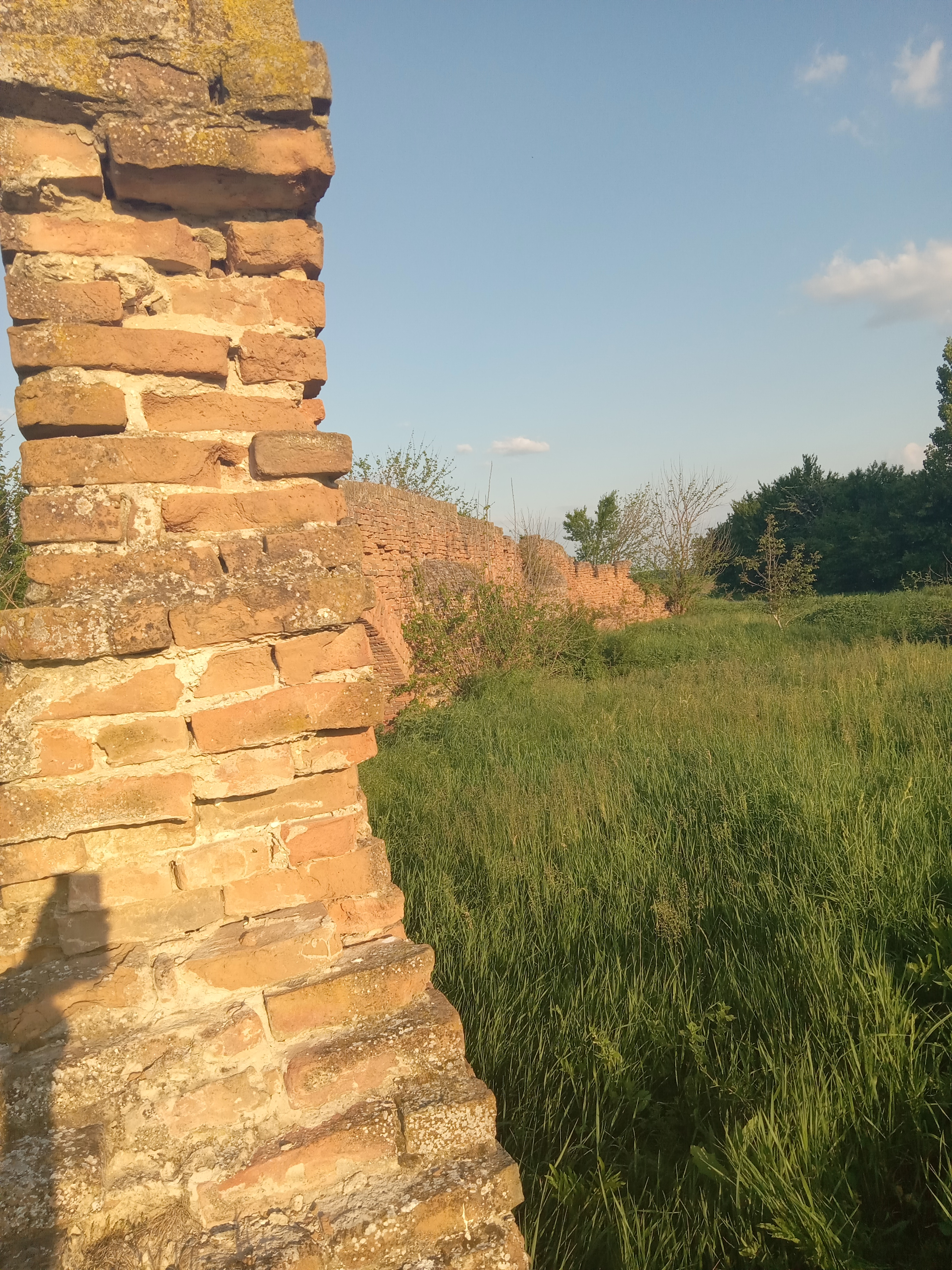

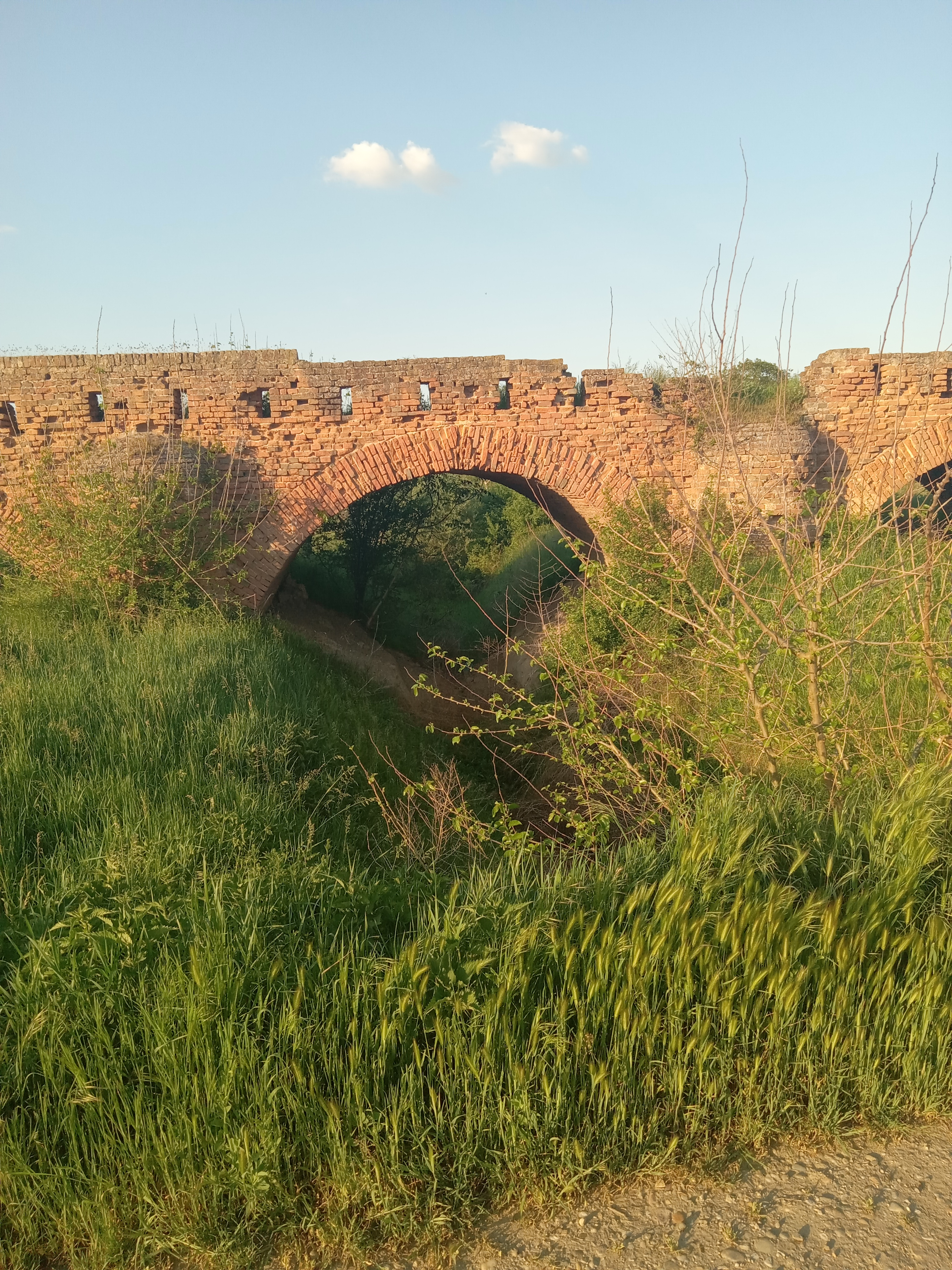

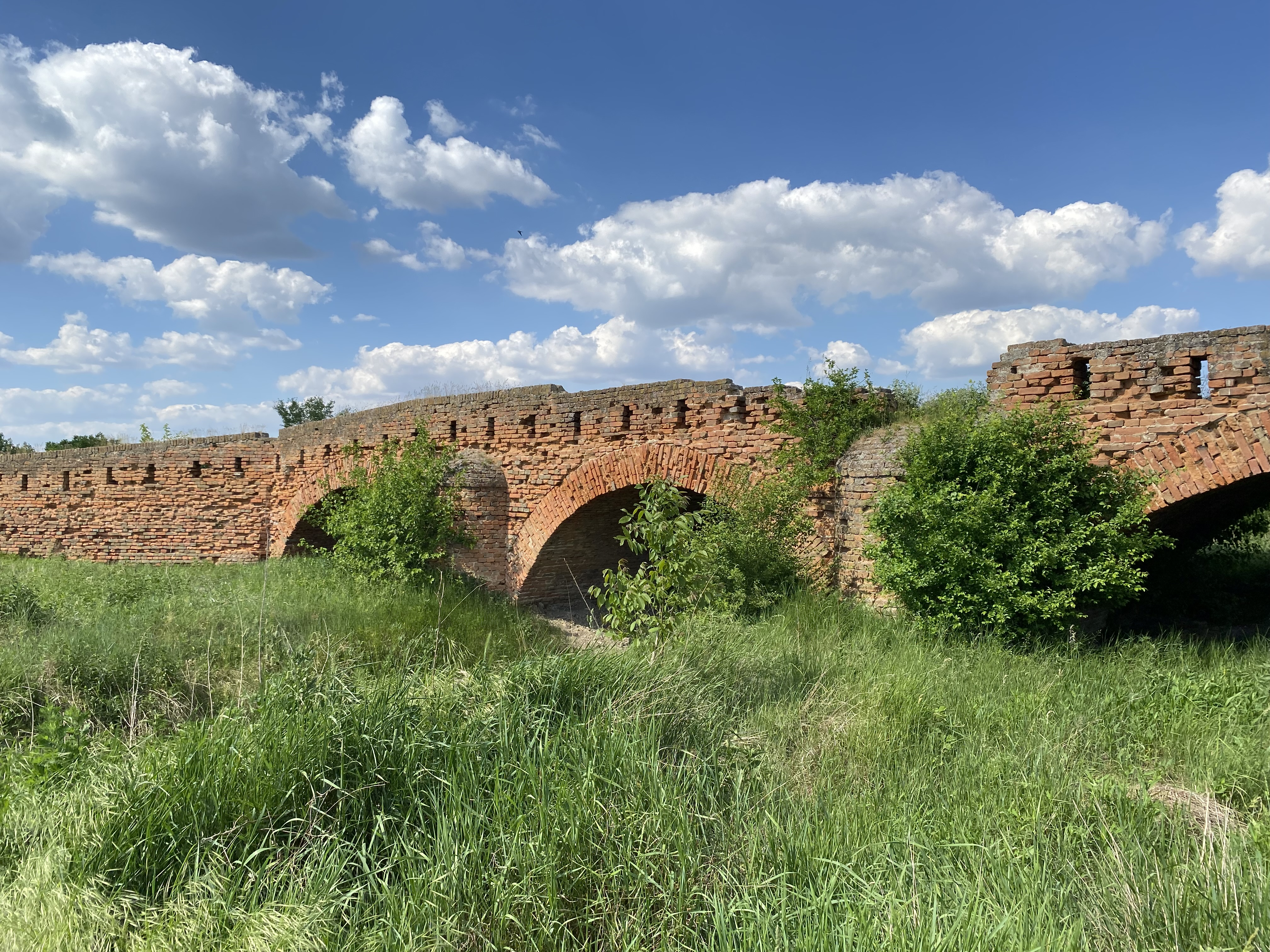

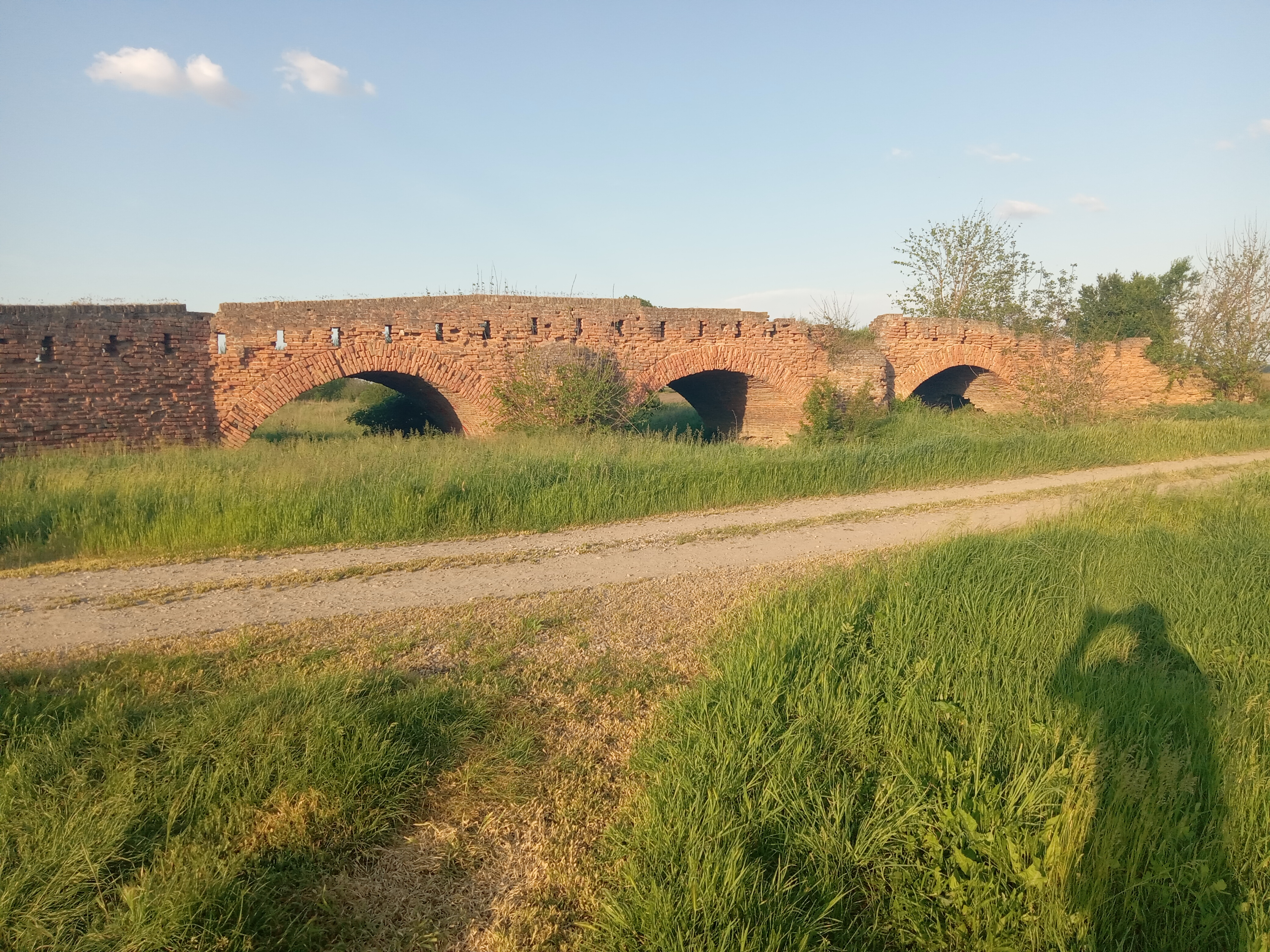

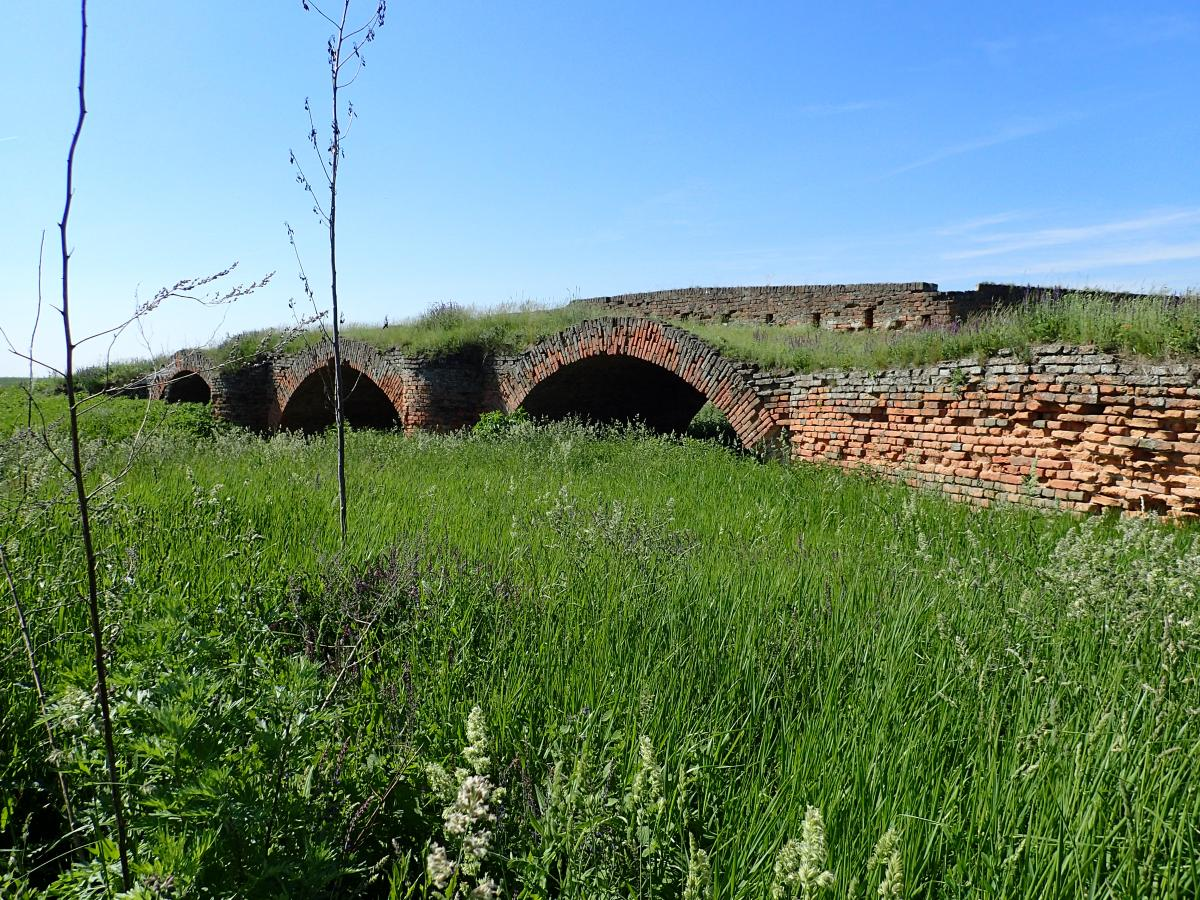
