= Pločica =

Pločica Плочица
- Village (Selo)
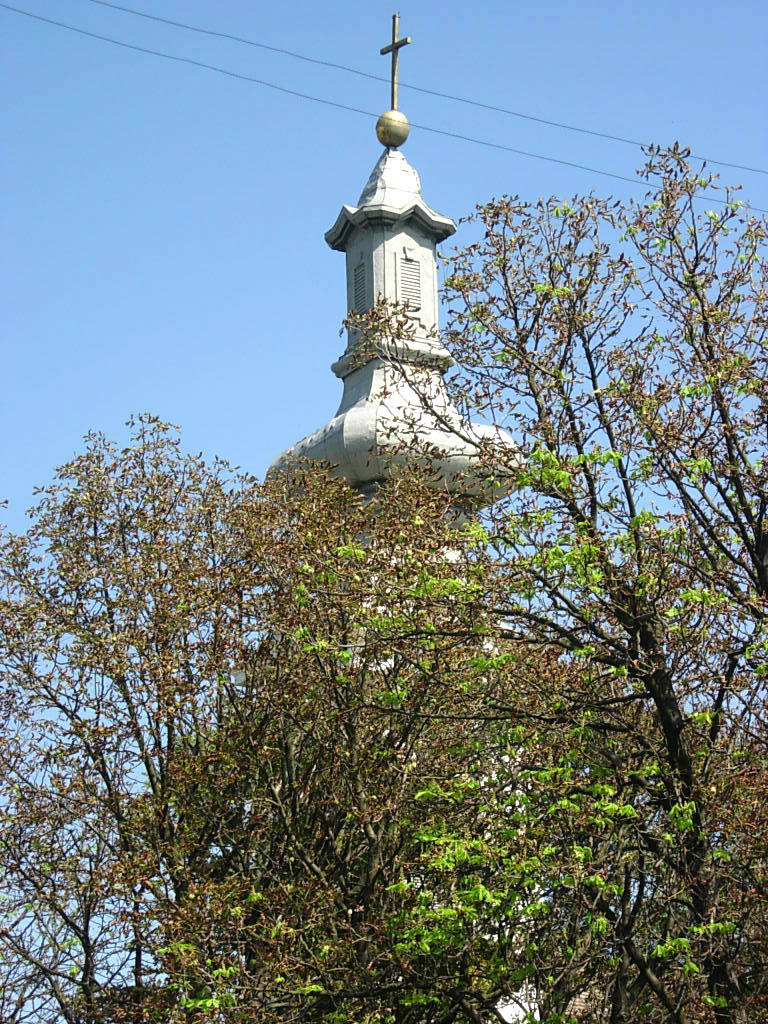
- The Orthodox Church

- Location of Pločica within Serbia Pločica (Serbia) Pločica (Europe)
- Coordinates: 44°43′07″N 20°53′02″E
- Country: Serbia
- Province: Vojvodina
- District: South Banat
- Municipality: Kovin
- Elevation: 57 m (187 ft)

Population (2002)
  - Pločica: 2,044
- Time zone: UTC+1 (CET)
  - Summer (DST): UTC+2 (CEST)
- Postal code: 26229
- Area code: +381(0)13
- Car plates: KO

Pločica (Serbian Cyrillic: Плочица) is a village in Serbia. It is situated in the Kovin municipality, in the South Banat District, Vojvodina province. The village has a Serb ethnic majority (94.32%) and a population of 2,044 (2002 census).

== Name ==
In Serbian the village is known as Pločica (Плочица), in Hungarian as Kevepallós, in German as Ploschitz or Blauschütz, and in Romanian as Plocița.

== History ==
The area was originally settled by Serbs in the end of the 17th century and later by the German colonists in the end of the 18th century. In 1910, the village had a Serb majority and a sizable Danube Swabian minority. Until the Second World War, 1,300 Danube Swabians lived in Pločica.

== Historical population ==
- 1948: 2,364
- 1953: 2,702
- 1961: 2,371
- 1971: 2,146
- 1981: 2,100
- 1991: 2,013

== Ethnic groups ==
Year	Total	Serbs	Yugoslavs	Hungarians	Montenegrins	Macedonians	Germans	Romanians	Other
1991	2,013	91.85%	2.83%	1.29%	1.19%	0.89%	0.49%	0.49%	0.26%
2002	2,044	94.32%	0.44%	2.1%	0.29%	0.29%	0.29%	0.29%	1.98%

== See also ==
- List of places in Serbia
- List of cities, towns and villages in Vojvodina

== Gallery ==
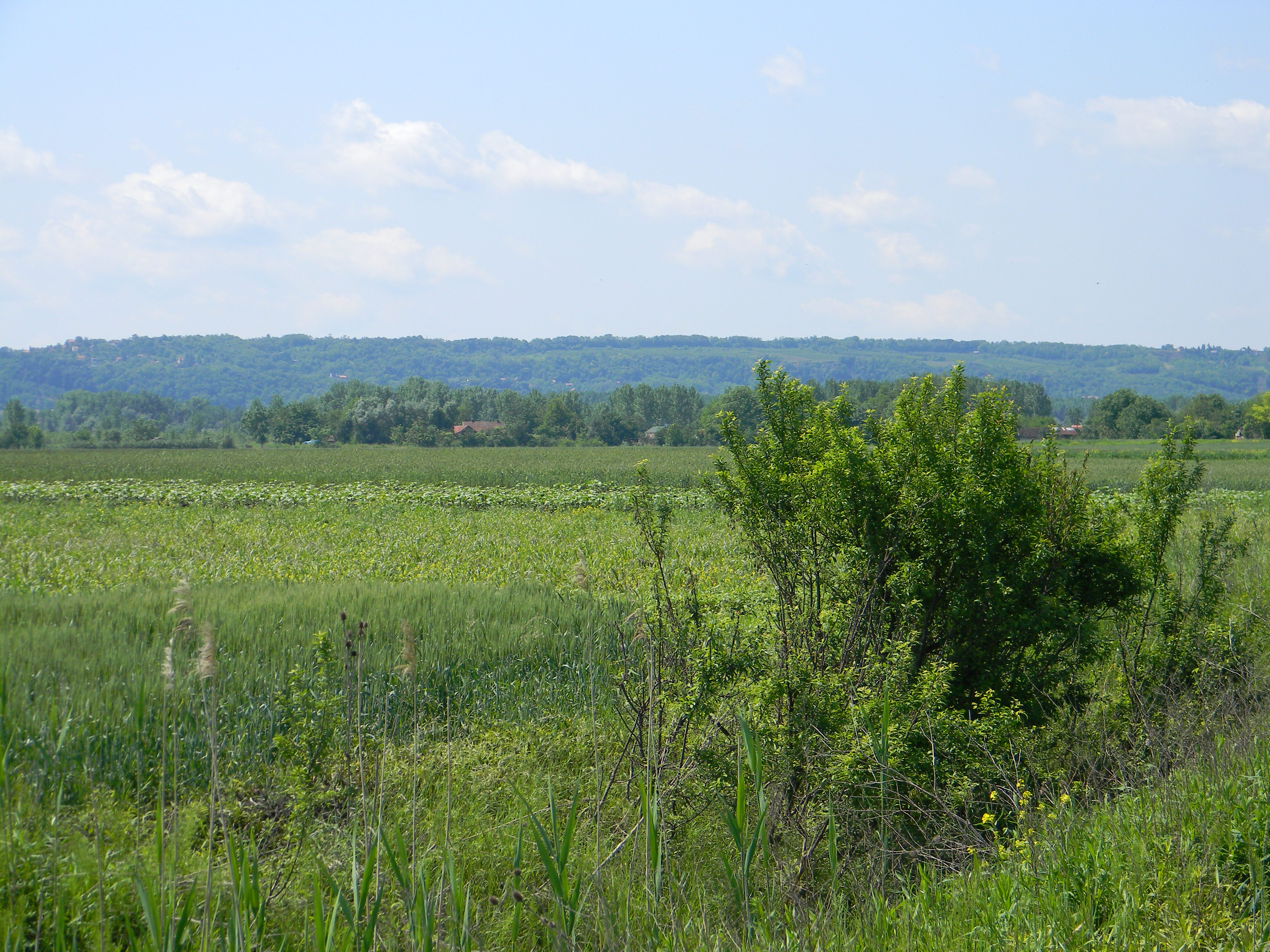
Former Skorenovački, now Pločički Rit

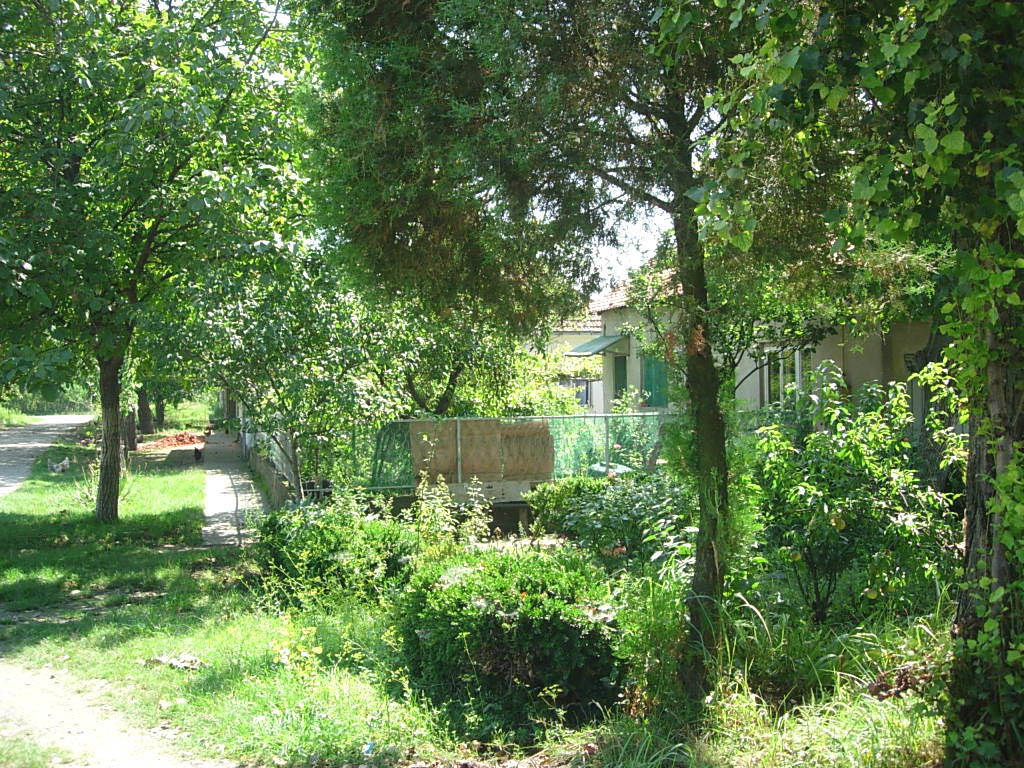
Place of the old church

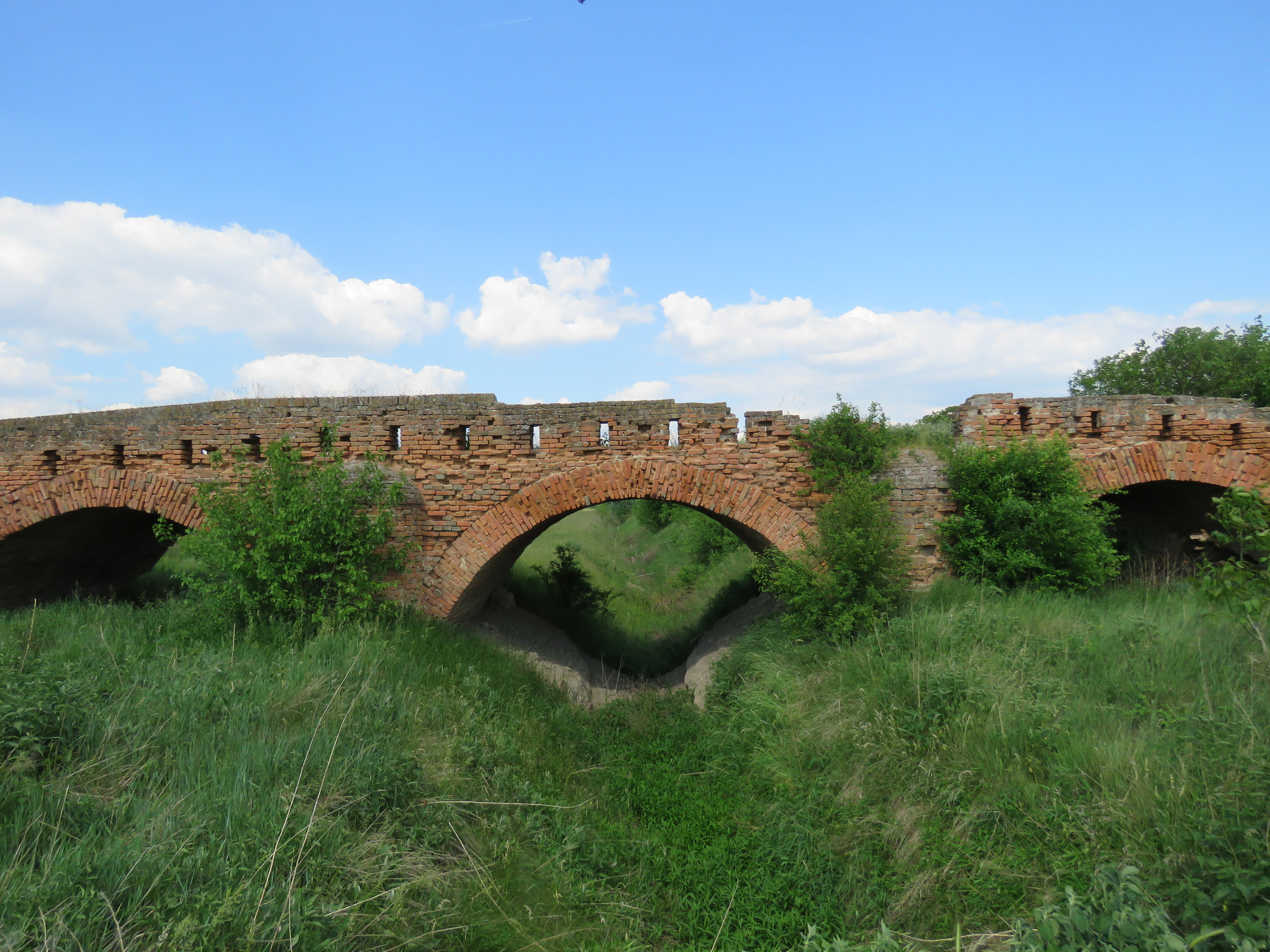
Old bridge (Pločica)

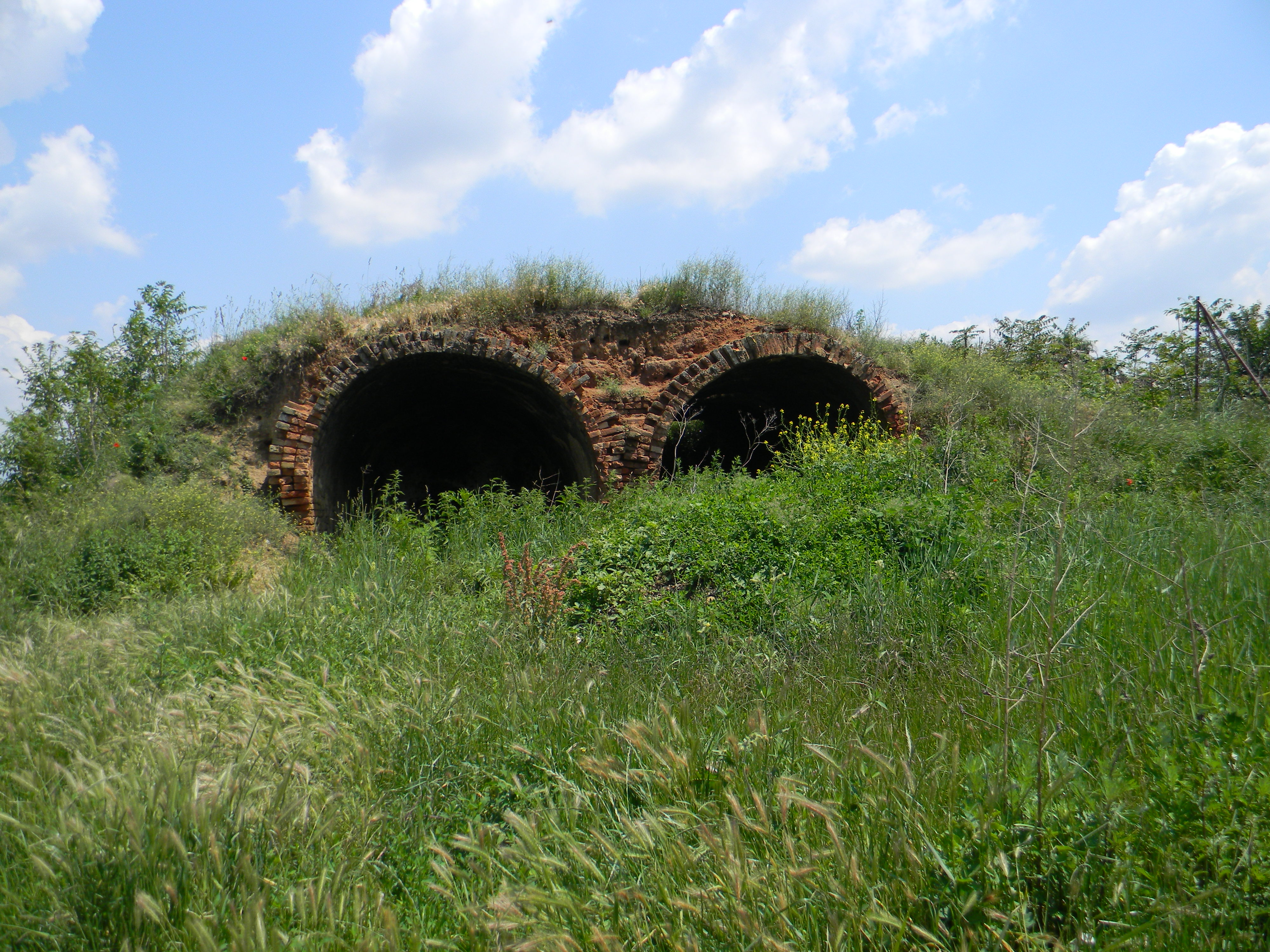
Old kilns
