= Ponjavica Nature Park =

Nature park in Vojvodina, Serbia

Ponjavica Nature Park Park prirode Ponjavica
- IUCN category V (protected landscape/seascape)
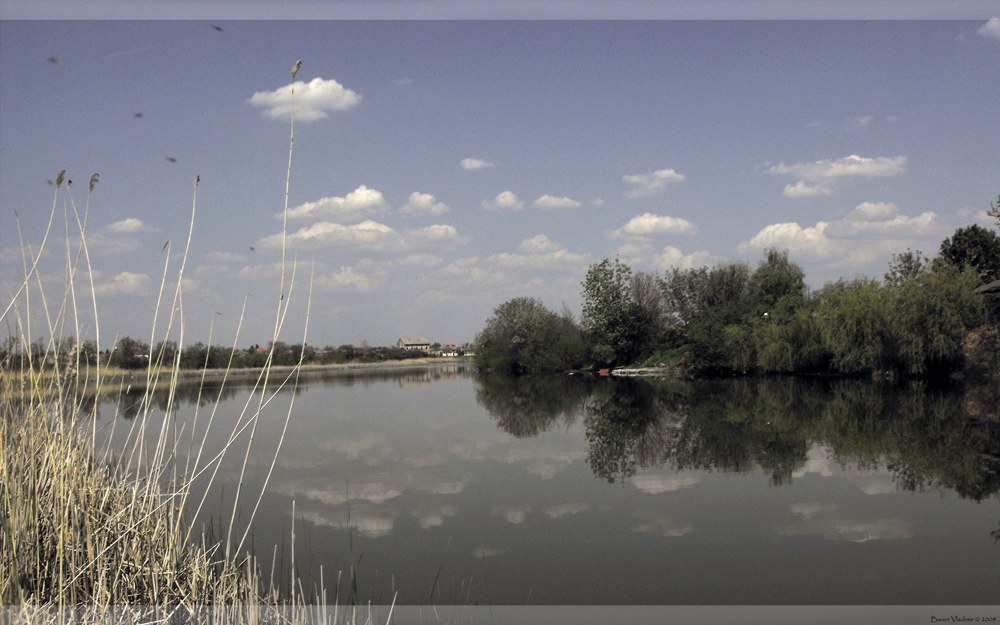
- View of park in2024

- Location within Vojvodina Location within Serbia Location within Europe
- Location: Vojvodina, Serbia
- Nearest city: Pančevo
- Coordinates: 44°44′50″N 20°48′01″E
- Area: 1.336 km^{2} (0.516 sq mi)
- Established: March 1, 1995
- Governing body: 87,38% Serbia; 12,62% private property

The Ponjavica Nature Park (Serbian Cyrillic: Парк природе Поњавица), is a protected natural asset in the territory of the municipality of Pančevo, between Omoljica and Banatski Brestovac, on the left bank of the lower reaches of the Danube River. In Serbia, it is categorized as a nature park by legal regulations. It is classified in the III category of natural assets. The natural asset has been under state protection since 1995 by the Decision on the Protection of the Ponjavica Nature Park. The Government of the Republic of Serbia entrusted the management of the Nature Park to the public enterprise Tamiš - Dunav from Pančevo.

== Legal framework ==
The protection procedure was initiated by the Provincial Institute for Nature Protection, which in 1991 adopted the Decision on the Prior Protection of the Natural Asset "Ponjavica", while in 1994 the Institute for Nature Protection of Serbia published the report "Proposal for the Protection of the Natural Asset Ponjavica as a Nature Park", which categorized this asset in Category III as a significant natural asset, on the basis of which the Pančevo Municipal Assembly adopted the "Decision on the Protection of the Ponjavica Nature Park" in 1995 and established the II degree of protection. Starting from 2002, the guardian of the Ponjavica Nature Park has been the DVP "Tamiš-Dunav" from Pančevo, which is responsible for the revitalization, rehabilitation, restoration and proposal for further protection of the Park.

== Geographical and climatic features ==
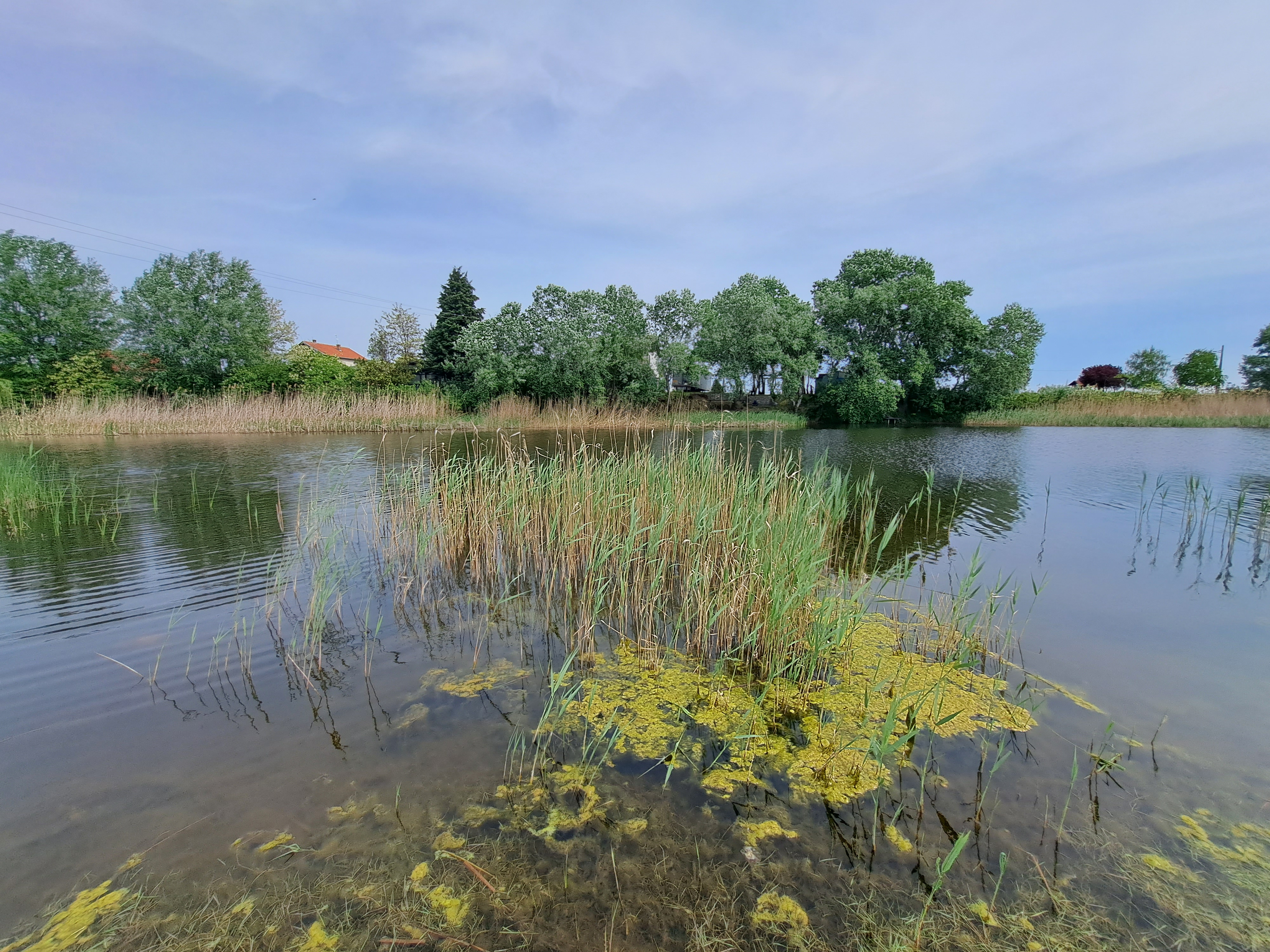
Nature park Ponjavica

Ponjavica Nature Park is located in southern Banat and territorially belongs to the Autonomous Province of Vojvodina - City of Pančevo. The climate is moderately continental with long and warm summers, mild winters and short springs. The most common wind is the Košava, which can blow in the Park area for up to three weeks with stormy gusts. During the winter periods, northern and northeastern winds bring long-lasting rains and in the summer sudden showers. The territory of the Pančevo municipality is considered one of the warmest areas of Vojvodina with an average annual temperature of 12 °C and more than a hundred sunny days during the year, which is extremely suitable for agriculture and tourism.

The environmental feature of the "Ponjavica" is characterized by the uniqueness of the permanent water surface and the contrast of the steep left and low right banks that border the riverbed with a mosaic arrangement of plant communities of aquatic, marsh-swamp and forest types of vegetation. A special quality is given to this type of ecosystem by the spatial alternation of forest greenery, shrubby trees and bushes, fruit trees, as well as the immediate proximity of two settlements and the existing weekend zone. This diversity represents the potential for the development of the tourist offer, especially from a recreational and educational-ecological aspect.

The "Ponjavica" Nature Park is characterized by the contrast of the banks in the orographic sense between the steep left and low right banks, which border the riverbed of the Ponjavica. From a geological point of view, these are higher positions and sections of the Banat loess terrace, or rather the flattened terrain of the Danube alluvial plain.

The length of the Ponjavice River within the Ponjavice Nature Park is 7.2 km, and a total of 10 km of the river is protected. The area of the protected area is approximately 134 hectares.

According to environmental quality surveys conducted in 2007, the water quality in the river deviates from the II quality class due to the presence of increased amounts of ammonia and organic matter, which has worsened the situation compared to the period of the declaration of the protected natural resource.

== Living world ==
The water of the Ponjavica River is characterized by a heterogeneous composition of the phytoplankton community. All major systematic groups are present. In terms of the number of taxa, the dominant position belongs to green algae.

Of the zooplankton, representatives of Rotatoria dominate. Zoobenthos is more diverse and is dominated by Chironomidae. Benthofauna is very poor due to the presence of heavy metals. Fragments of the Myriophyllo-Pontametum association have also been found in the waters. The wetland system is represented by a community of reeds and tall sedges. The forest vegetation includes degraded communities of white willow, poplar, etc. About 100 plant species have been recorded. Nature park Ponjavica is home to 40 species of birds.

The fish fund is dominated by carp and catfish, but it is becoming increasingly endangered. There is also a strictly protected species of fish – the golden crucian carp, and among mammals – the otter. When it comes to animal species, the South Banat species of ant is extremely rare, inhabiting open sandy habitats next to rivers that are occasionally flooded.

The Ponjavica River belongs to the Black Sea basin and is home to 20 species of fish belonging to the families Esocidae, Cyprinidae, etc.

== Gallery ==
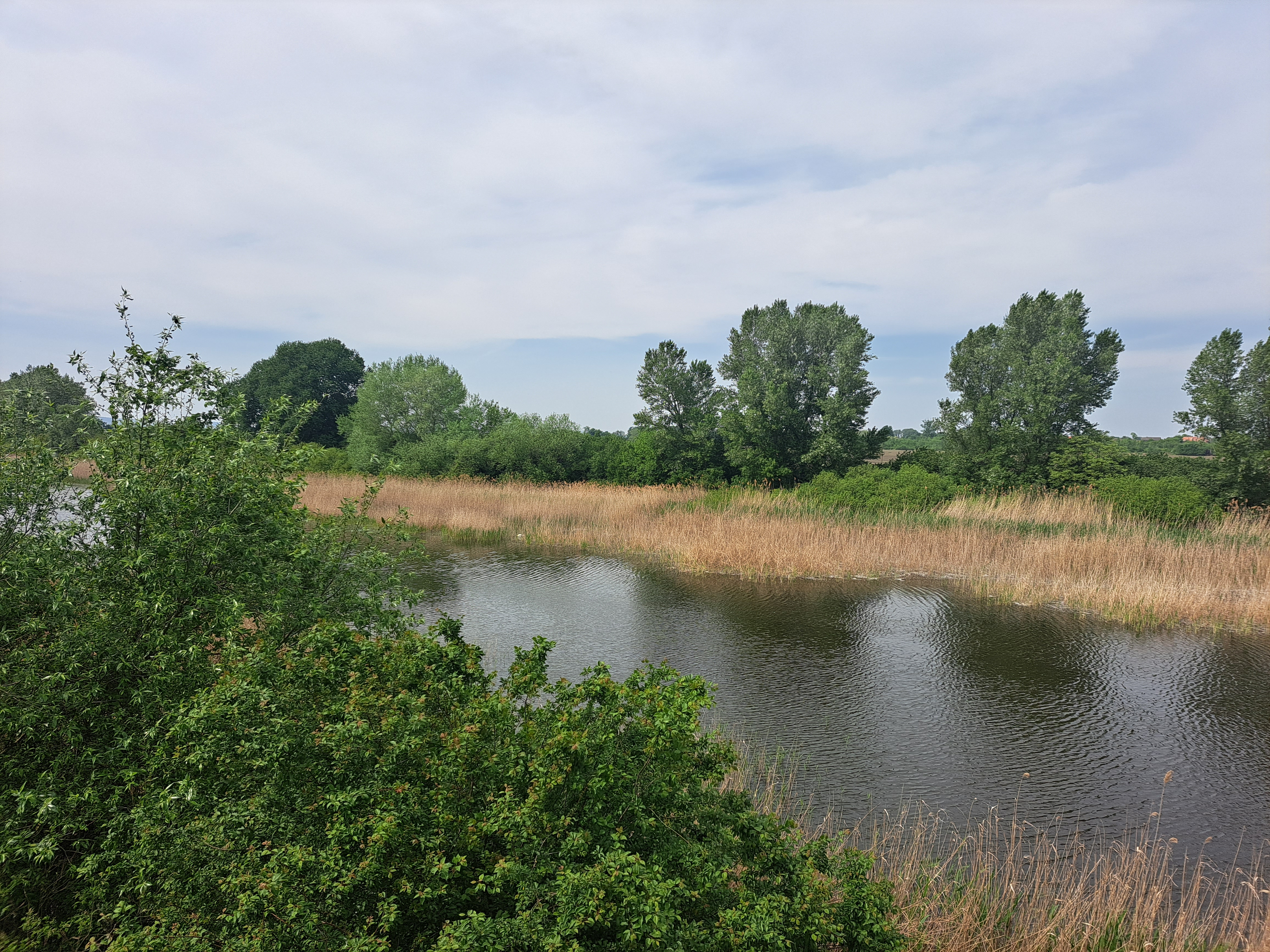

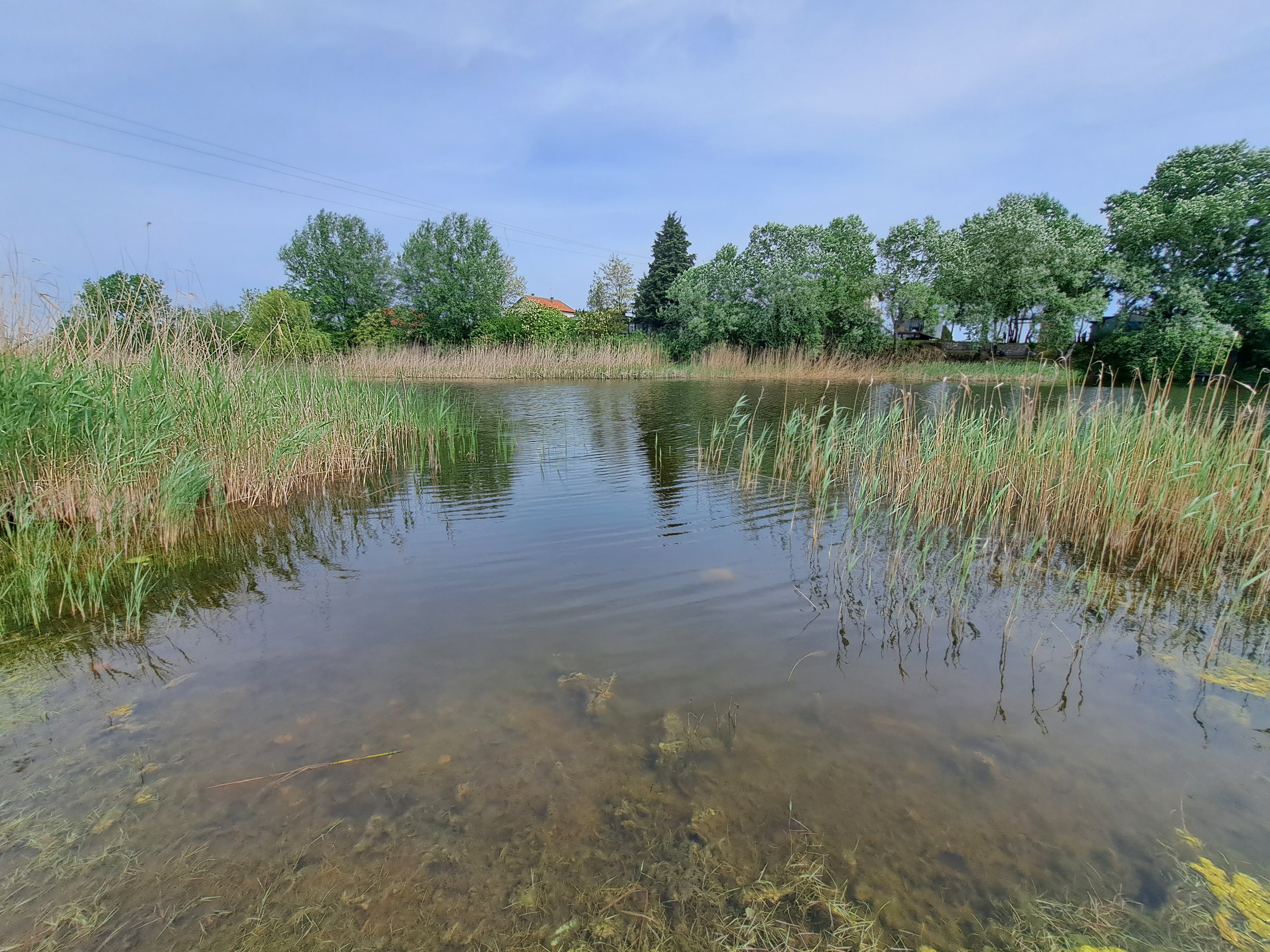

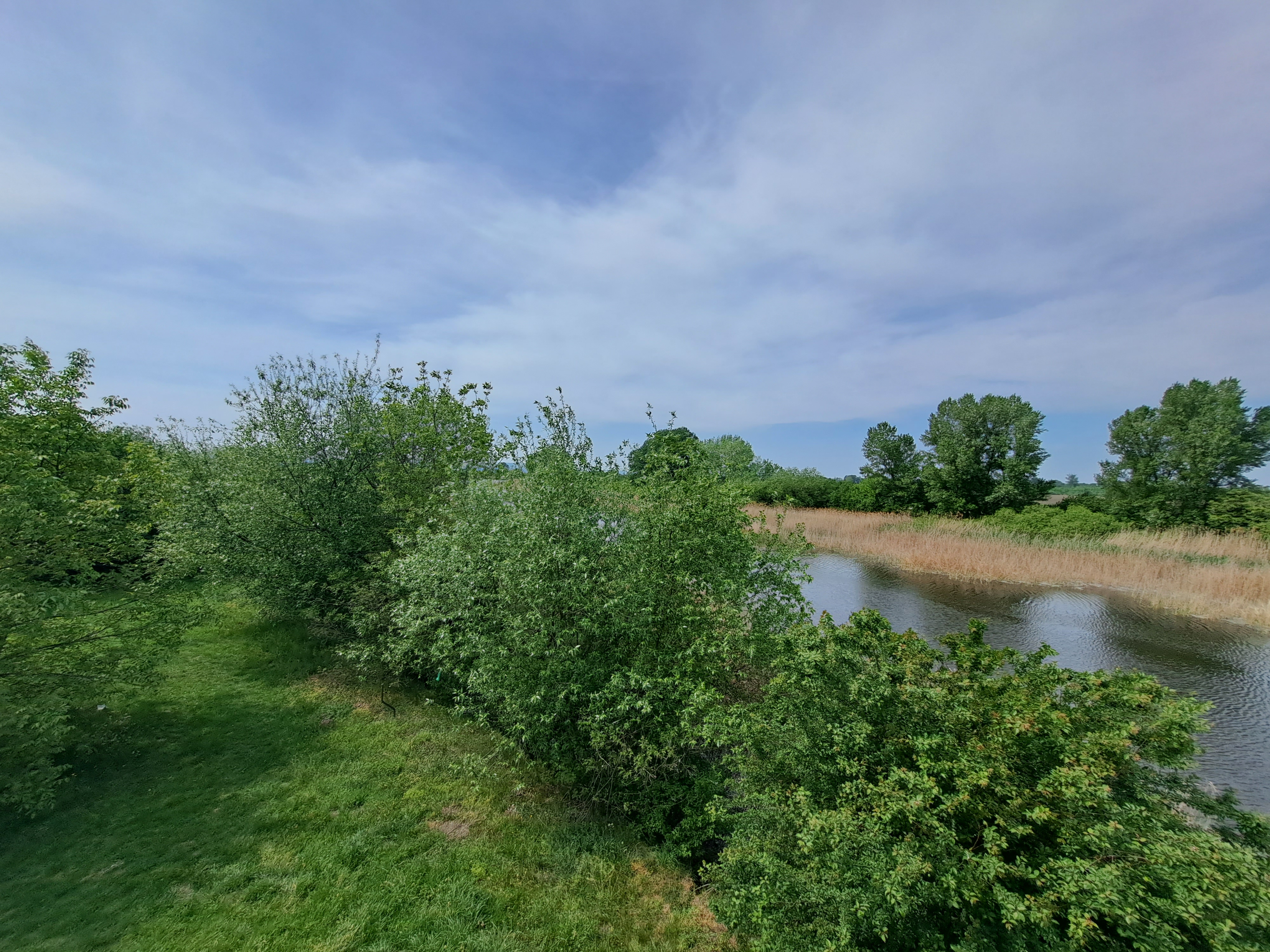

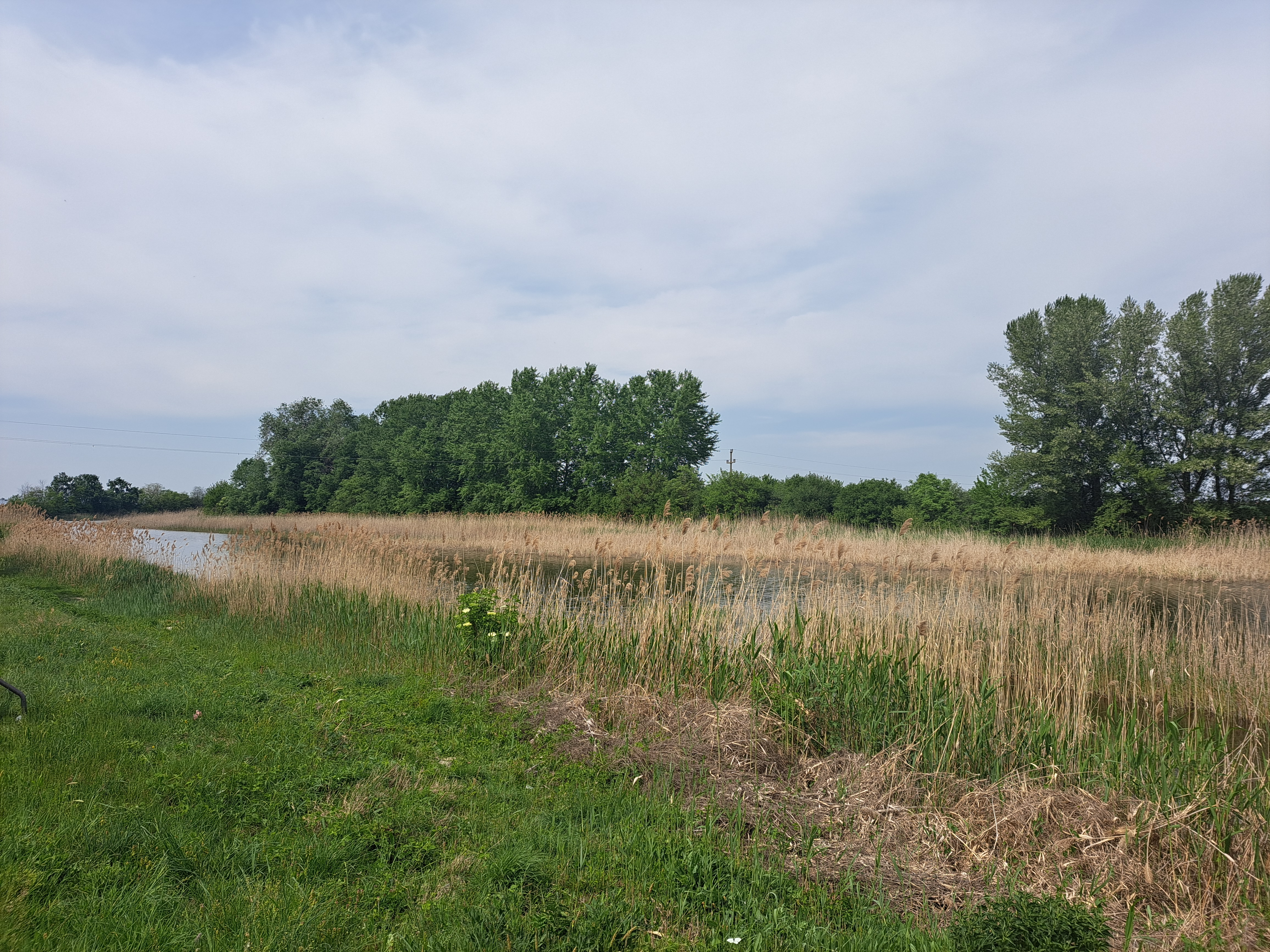

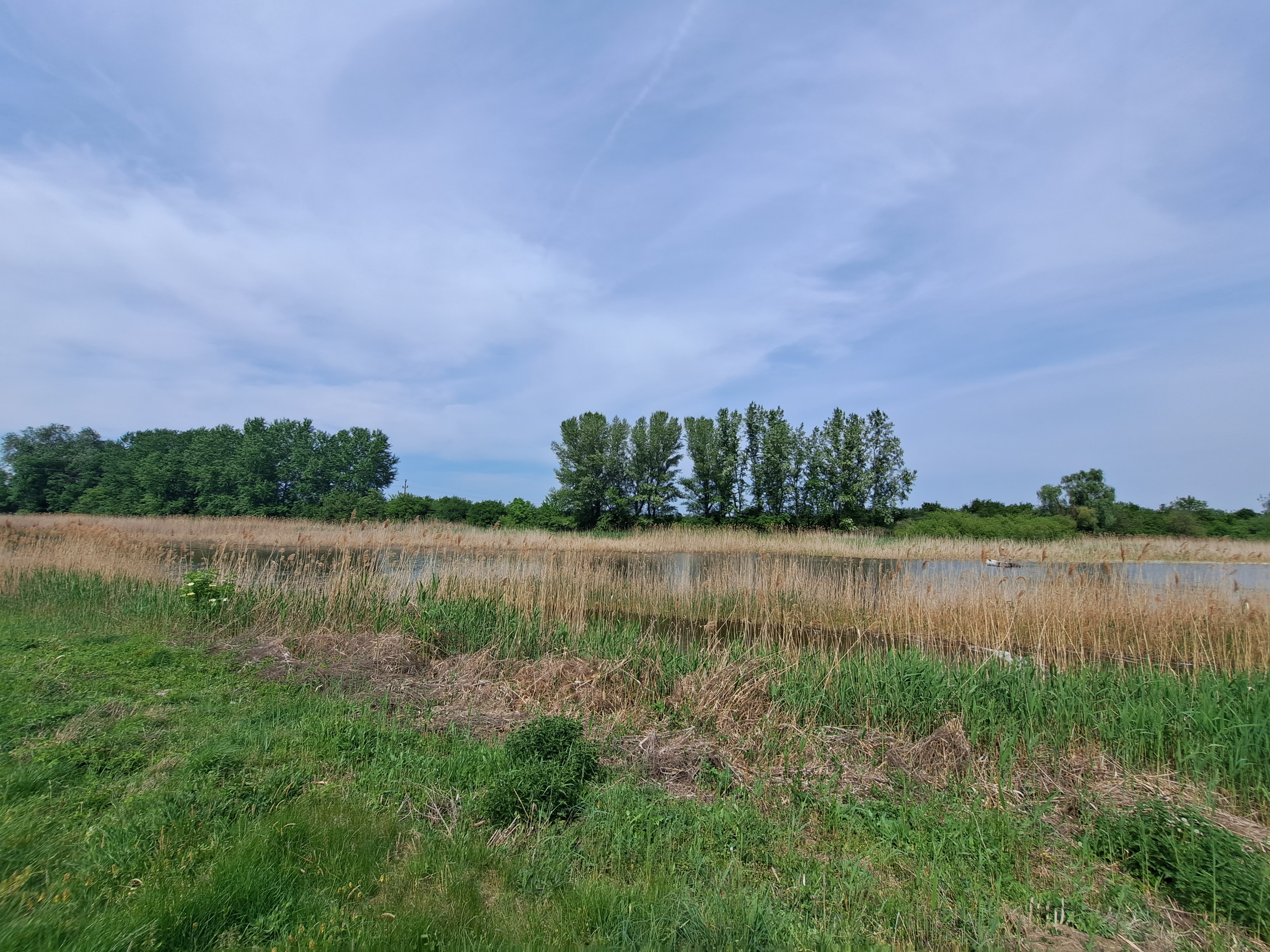

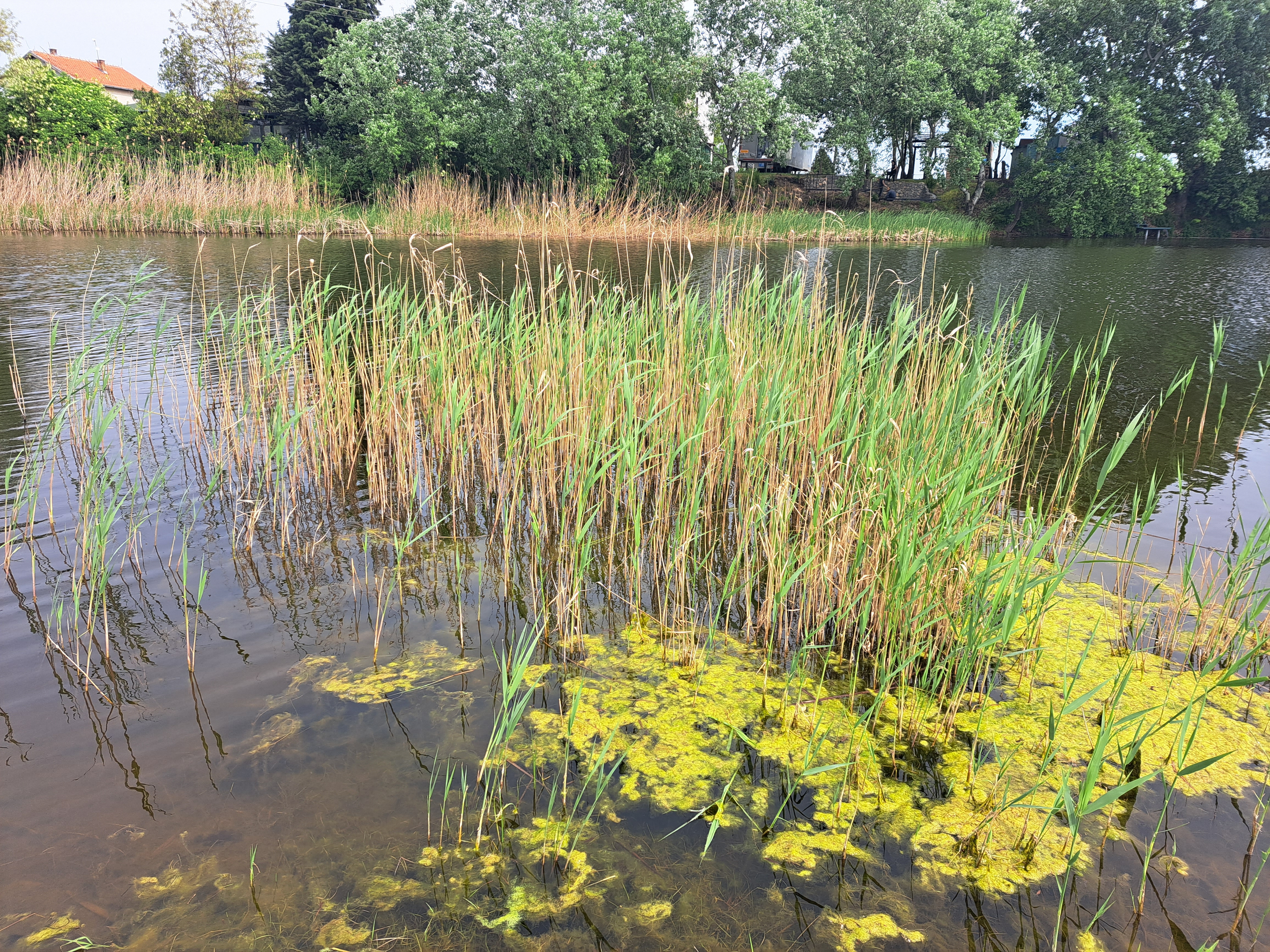
