= Brestovăț =

- Commune
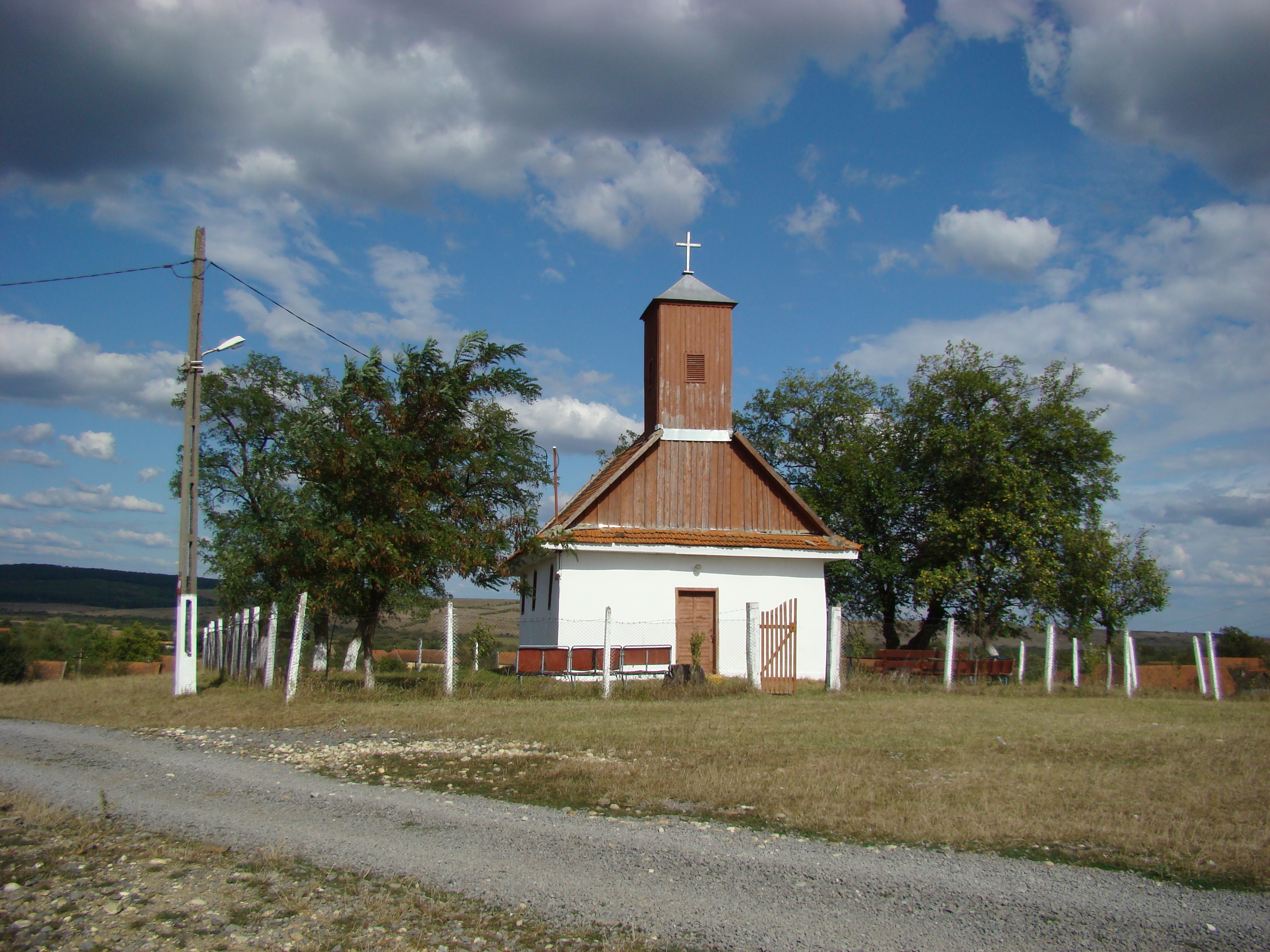
- The Serbian wooden church in Lucareț

- Location in Timiș County

- Location in Romania
- Coordinates: 45°52′23″N 21°40′52″E
- Country: Romania
- County: Timiș
- Established: 1440 (first attested)
- Subdivisions: Brestovăț, Coșarii, Hodoș, Lucareț, Teș

Government
  - Mayor (2004–): Eugen Dobra (PNL)
- Area: 103.17 km^{2} (39.83 sq mi)
- Population (2021-12-01): 675
  - Density: 6.54/km^{2} (16.9/sq mi)
- Time zone: UTC+02:00 (EET)
  - Summer (DST): UTC+03:00 (EEST)
- Postal code: 307085–307089
- Vehicle reg.: TM
- Website: www.primaria-brestovat.ro

Brestovăț (Hungarian: Aga, until 1892 Bresztovác; German: Brestowatz; Slovak: Brestovec; Serbian: Брестовац, romanized: Brestovac) is a commune in Timiș County. It is composed of five villages: Brestovăț (commune seat), Coșarii, Hodoș, Lucareț and Teș.

== History ==
Brestovăț first appears in written history as Breztolcz in 1440; at that time, it belonged to the Șoimoș Fortress. It was destroyed during the Turkish occupation and resettled in 1718–1722. Turks called it Aga, an unofficial name that persisted for a while and was taken over by Hungarians and later by the Romanian administration.

Between 1735 and 1737, 113 families of Montenegrin Serbs, mostly Orthodox, settled here. In 1797, Brestovăț became the property of the Lukács brothers, who colonized a large number of Hungarian and Slovak settlers here. Around 1828, now a property of Iosif Gaal, it was again colonized by Hungarians from Nógrád, Nyitra and Trencsén. The colonizations do not stop here, because in 1840–1845, German settlers from Bohemia arrived in Brestovăț.

== Demographics ==
Ethnic composition (2021)
1. Romanians (85.8%)
2. Slovaks (2.96%)
3. Unknown (10.4%)
4. Others (0.90%)
Religious composition (2021)
1. Orthodox (77.9%)
2. Roman Catholics (8.29%)
3. Baptists (1.48%)
4. Greek Catholics (1.18%)
5. Unknown (10.4%)
6. Others (0.76%)

Brestovăț had a population of 675 inhabitants at the 2021 census, up 0.15% from the 2011 census. Most inhabitants are Romanians (85.77%), with a minority of Slovaks (2.96%). For 10.37% of the population, ethnicity is unknown. By religion, most inhabitants are Orthodox (77.92%), but there are also minorities of Roman Catholics (8.29%), Baptists (1.48%) and Greek Catholics (1.18%). For 10.37% of the population, religious affiliation is unknown.

Census		Ethnic composition
Year	Population	Romanians	Hungarians	Germans	Roma	Serbs	Slovaks
1880	3,725	2,601	224	208	–	280	407
1890	3,934	2,684	259	235	–	298	442
1900	4,417	3,000	447	256	–	226	444
1910	4,471	2,933	517	151	–	367	425
1920	3,895	2,583	285	117	–	–	–
1930	3,853	2,764	216	188	105	107	455
1941	3,709	2,742	192	262	–	–	–
1956	3,210	2,481	144	73	–	112	397
1966	2,328	1,728	58	59	16	83	378
1977	1,364	873	42	44	9	52	338
1992	851	596	10	27	–	33	185
2002	818	589	19	16	–	43	151
2011	674	514	10	3	8	11	102
2021	675	579	–	–	–	–	20

== Politics and administration ==
The commune of Brestovăț is administered by a mayor and a local council composed of 9 councilors. The mayor, Eugen Dobra, from the National Liberal Party, has been in office since 2004. As from the 2024 local elections, the local council has the following composition by political parties:

Party	Seats	Composition
National Liberal Party	6	
Social Liberal Humanist Party	2	
Social Democratic Party	1	

== Gallery ==
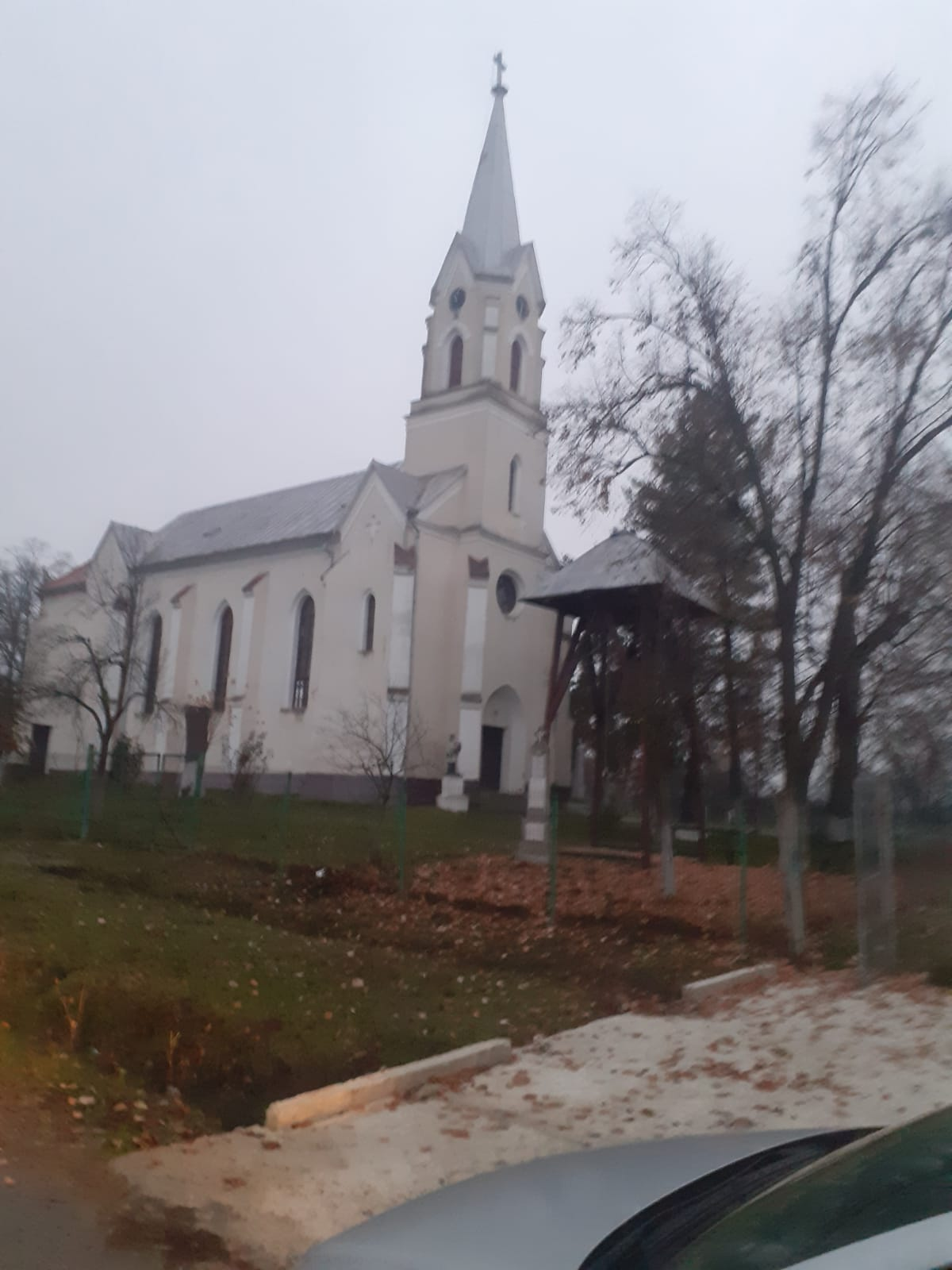
Roman Catholic church in Brestovăț

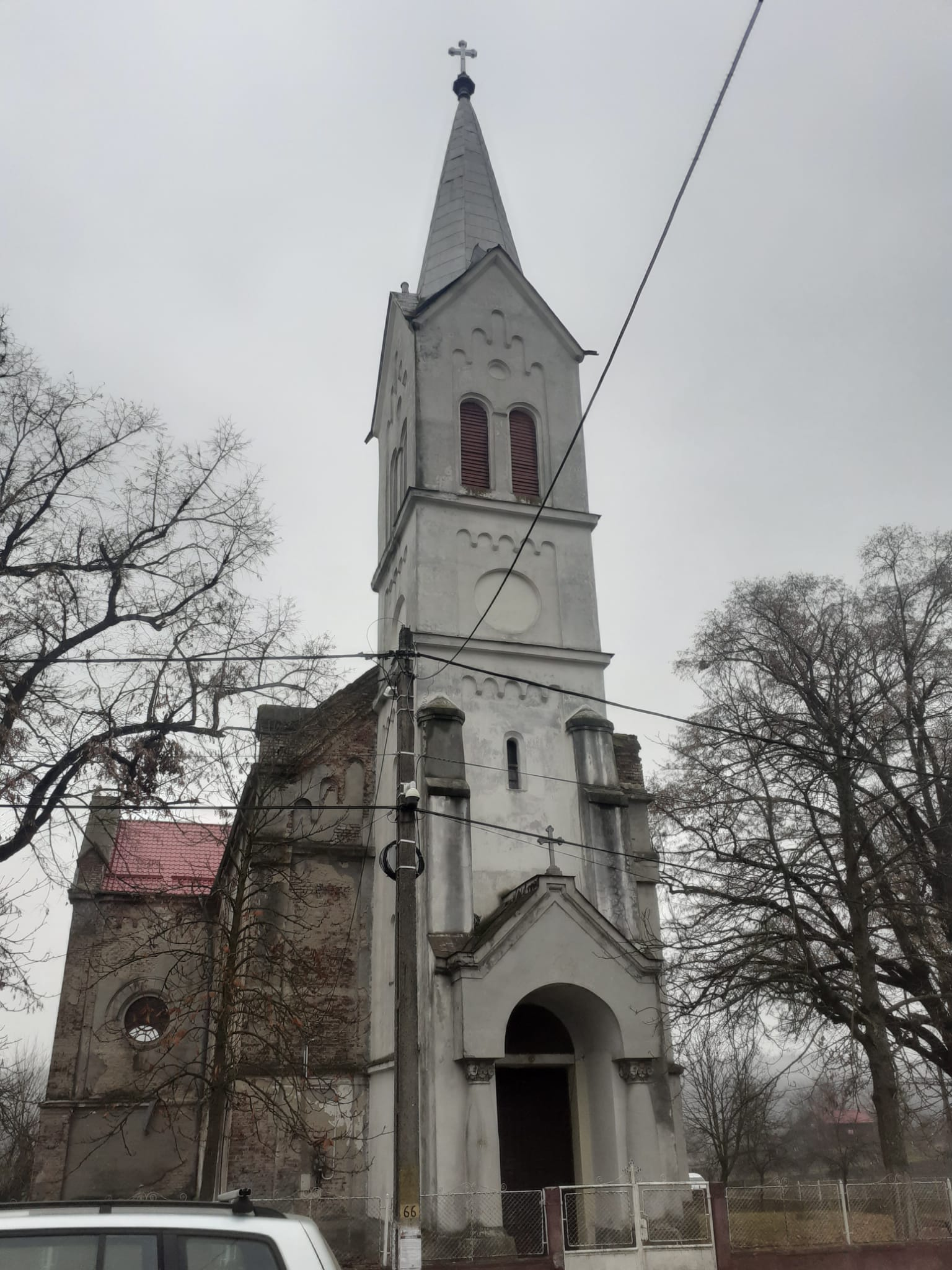
Roman Catholic church in Coșarii

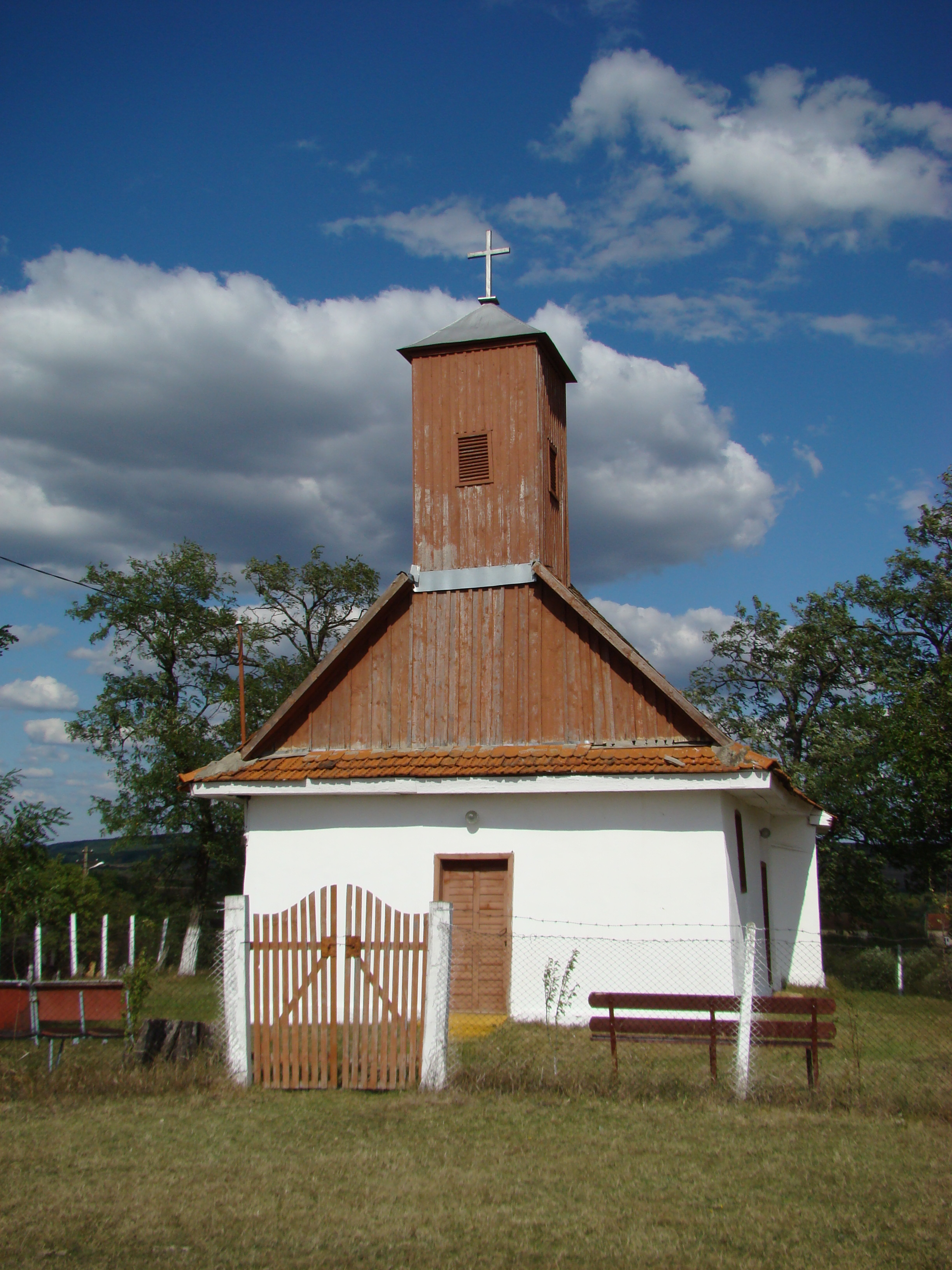
Wooden church in Lucareț

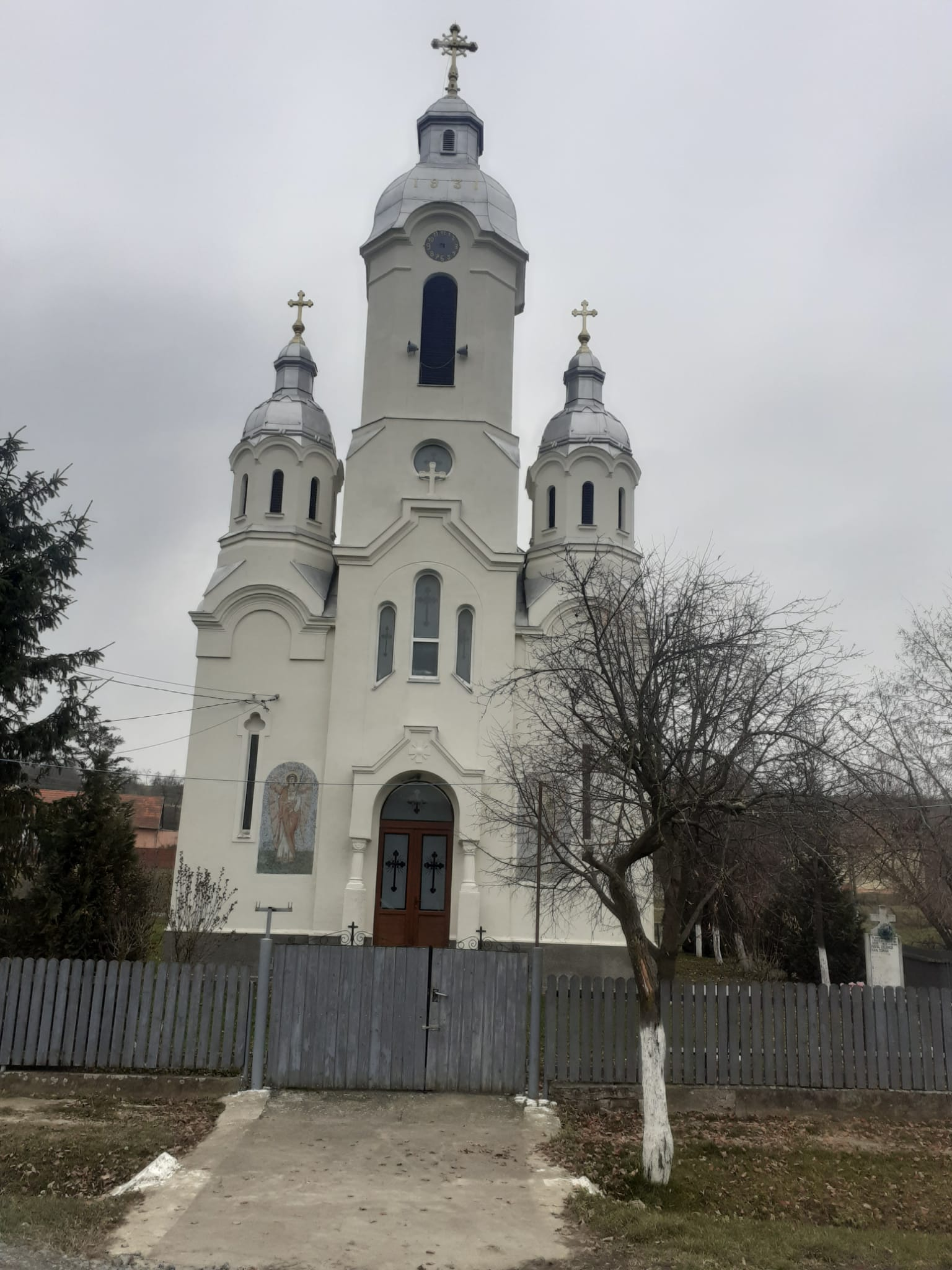
Orthodox church in Teș
