= Banatski Brestovac =

Banatski Brestovac Банатски Брестовац
- Village (Selo)
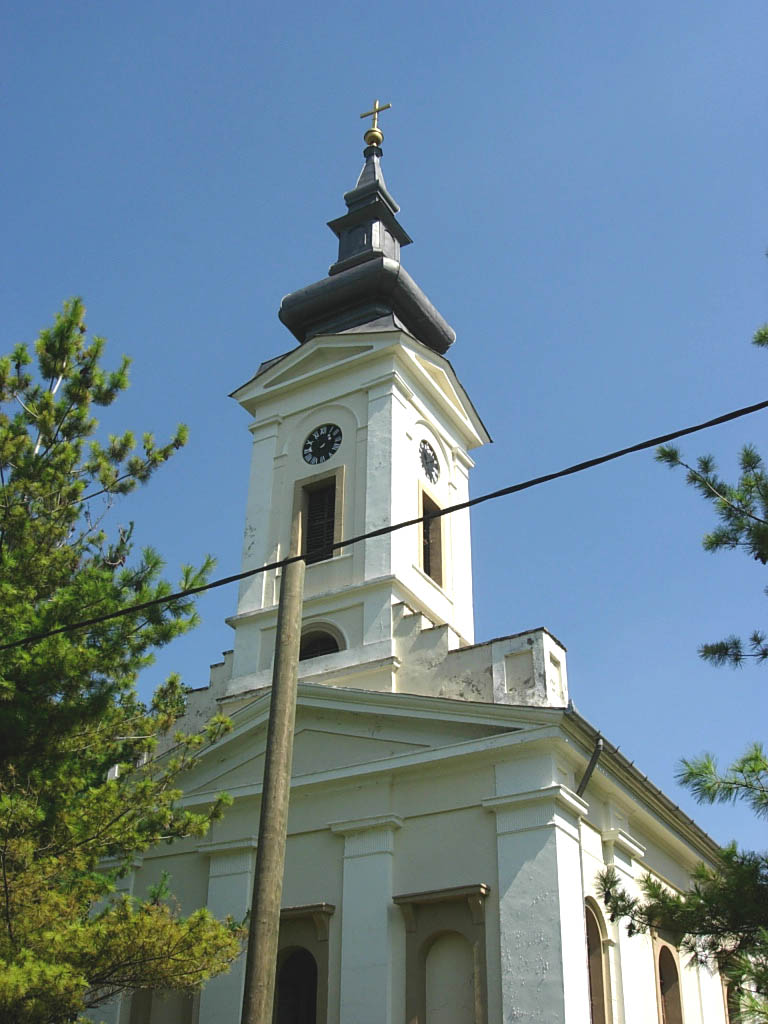

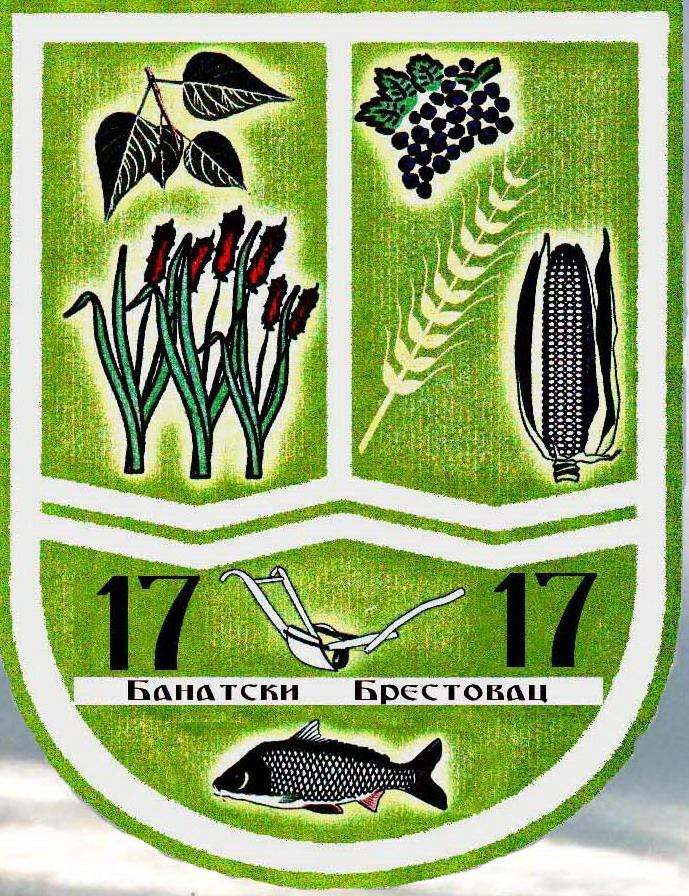
- Coat of arms

- Location of Banatski Brestovac within Serbia Banatski Brestovac (Serbia) Banatski Brestovac (Europe)
- Coordinates: 44°43′37″N 20°48′26″E
- Country: Serbia
- Province: Vojvodina
- District: South Banat
- Municipality: Pančevo

Area
  - Total: 61.90 km^{2} (23.90 sq mi)

Population (2011)
  - Total: 3,251
  - Density: 52.52/km^{2} (136.0/sq mi)
- Time zone: UTC+1 (CET)
  - Summer (DST): UTC+2 (CEST)
- Area code: +381(0)13
- Car plates: PA

Banatski Brestovac (Serbian Cyrillic: Банатски Брестовац) is a village located in the Municipality of Pančevo, in the South Banat District of Serbia. It is situated in the Autonomous Province of Vojvodina. The village has a Serbian ethnic majority and its population numbers 3,251 people (2011 census).

== Name ==
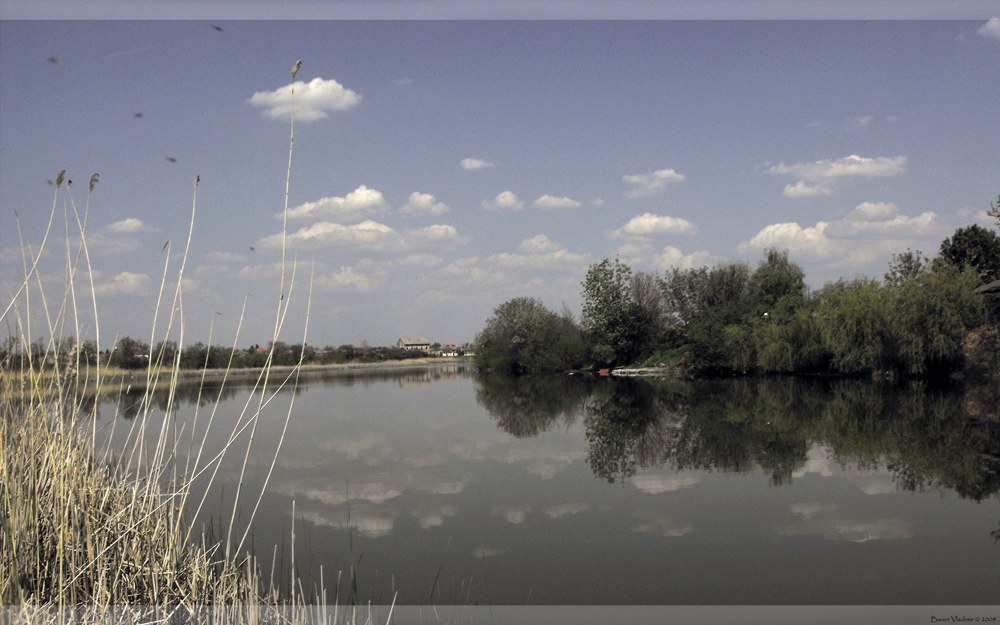
Ponjavica river

The name of the village refers to the stands of elm trees which surrounded the village. The name of the village is of Serbian origin, and a legend about origin of the name claims that the village was first settled by Rascian people from the village of Brestovik located on the southern bank of the Danube.

In Serbian, the village is known as Banatski Brestovac, in Hungarian as Beresztóc (official name from 1898 to 1918) and in German as Brestowatz (official name Rustendorf from March 1943 to September 1944).

== Geography ==
The village is located near the Ponjavica river at 44°43′37″N 20°48′26″E, approximately 21 km SE of Pančevo, 37 km SE of Pančevo bridge to Belgrade and 26 km NW of Smederevo. Since 1995, there is a protected nature park Ponjavica south of the village.

There is a camp and a village called Jabukov Cvet (serbian for apple flower, because of apple plantation located there) near Banatski Brestovac. Jabukov Cvet is known tourist destination of that area. The camp is visited by many international tourists during the year.

== History ==
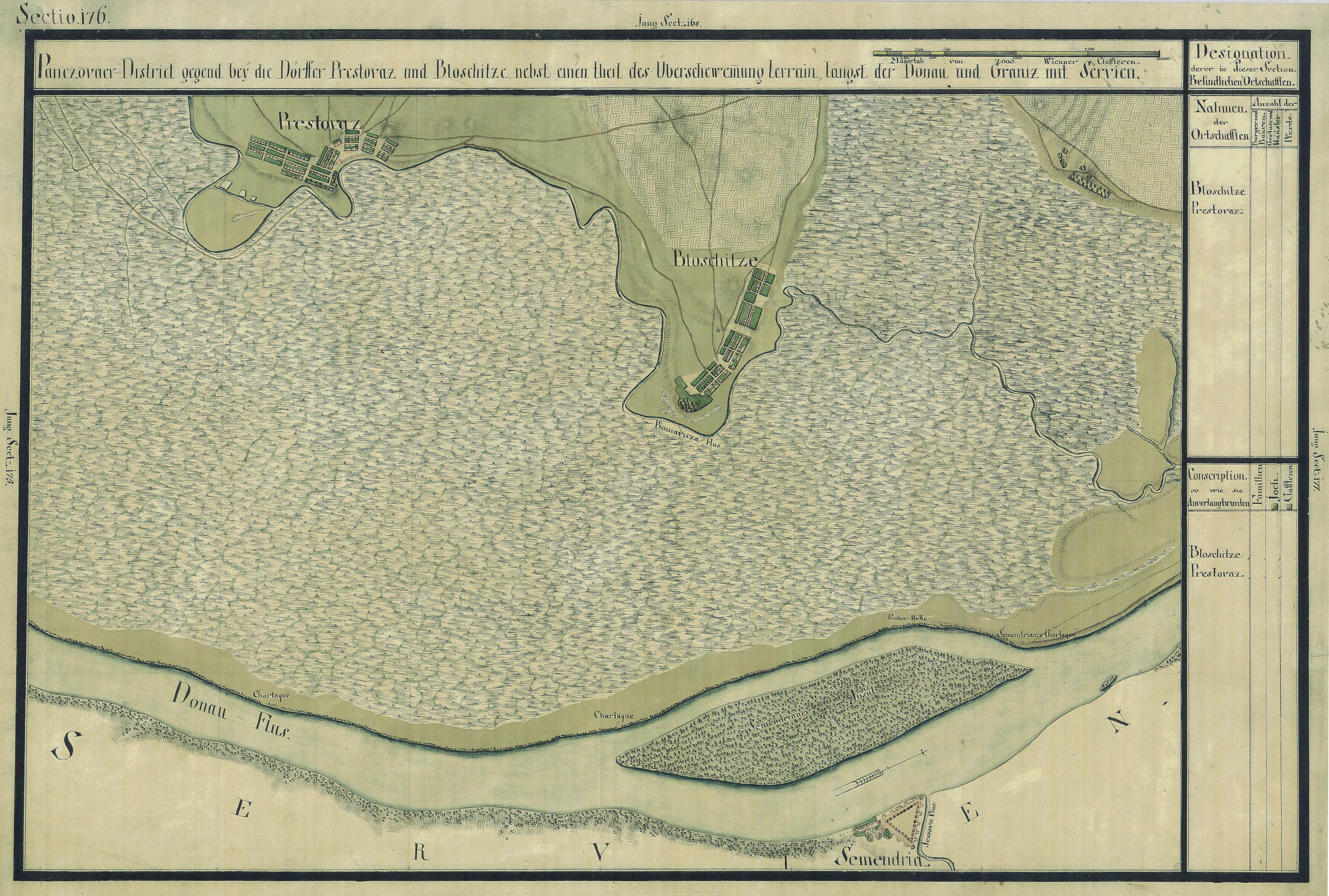
National Archives of Austria, Map of the Josephinian Land Survey (1769-1772)

The official year of founding of Brestovac is 1717, but it is only documented an abandoned settlement with 12 uninhabited houses in that time. The communal area was a part of Temeşvar Eyalet in Ottoman Empire since 1552, after the Treaty of Požarevac a part of Habsburg's Banat, since 1765 of the military frontier (Austrian Empire) and then it belonged to the Torontál county of Austria-Hungary. After World War I was that area a part of provisional Torontalsko-tamiške županja (Treaty of Trianon), in 1922 of Belgrade oblast and since 1929 of the Danube Banovina in the Kingdom of Yugoslavia. In the time after World War II its belonged to the Srez Pančevo of the Socialist Federal Republic of Yugoslavia and the Federal Republic of Yugoslavia. The communal area of Banatski Brestovac was a part of the administrative region of the Pančevo municipality from all these centuries to the present.

There is an impression of the old village which is recorded on the map of the Franciscan land survey from the early 19th century at the National Archives of Austria. In 1902, cadastral maps of the village were recorded which are located at the National Archives of Hungary.

=== Historical population ===
Year	Total	Serbs	Germans	Muslims (nationality)	Romani	Montenegrins	Croats	Other nationalities
1880	2,622	38.06%	54.46%					7.48%
1910	3,752	34.80%	63.40%				0.02%	1.78%
1948	4,068	91.70%	6.10%	0.02%		0.90%	0.39%	0.89%
2002	3,517	86.12%	0.02%	5.08%	2.75%	0.37%	0.17%	5.49%

== Economy ==
The main occupation of the people is in agriculture, as with many other local settlements. Since several years, there is an annual event named Paprikijada in the village, organized by an economic and cultural association of local women called Aktiv Žena Sosa. During the event, all kinds of paprika are sold, culinary tastings of dishes offered, and the biggest and most beautiful paprika is chosen.

== Gallery ==
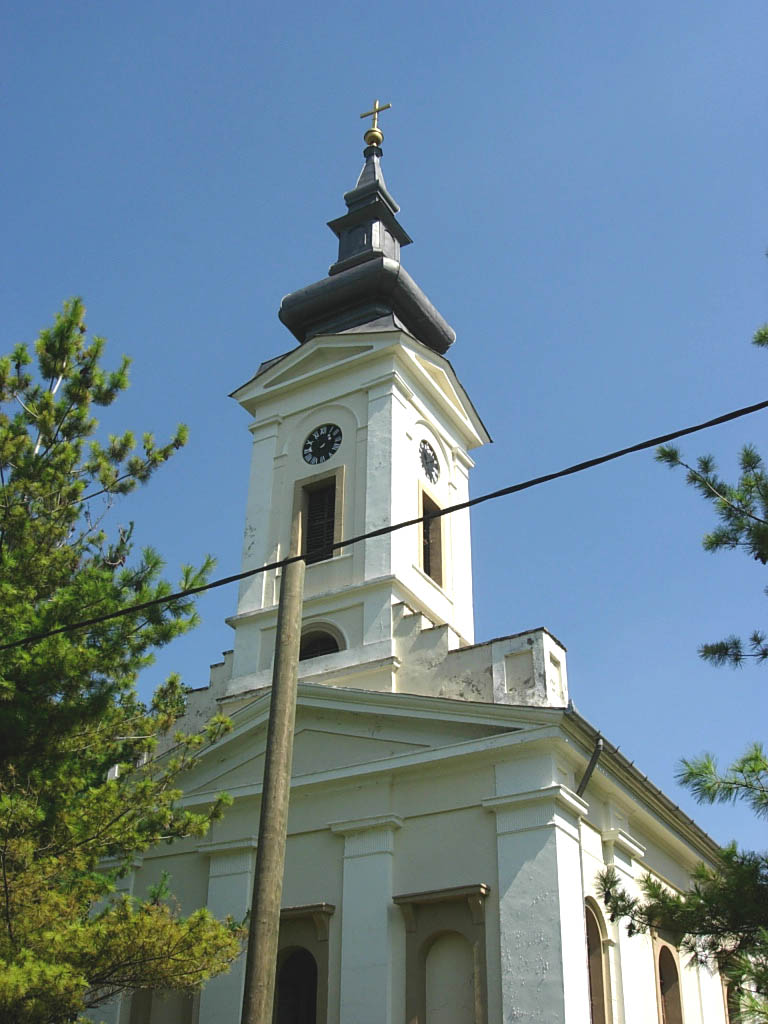
Bell tower of the Serbian Orthodox Church Ascension of Christ

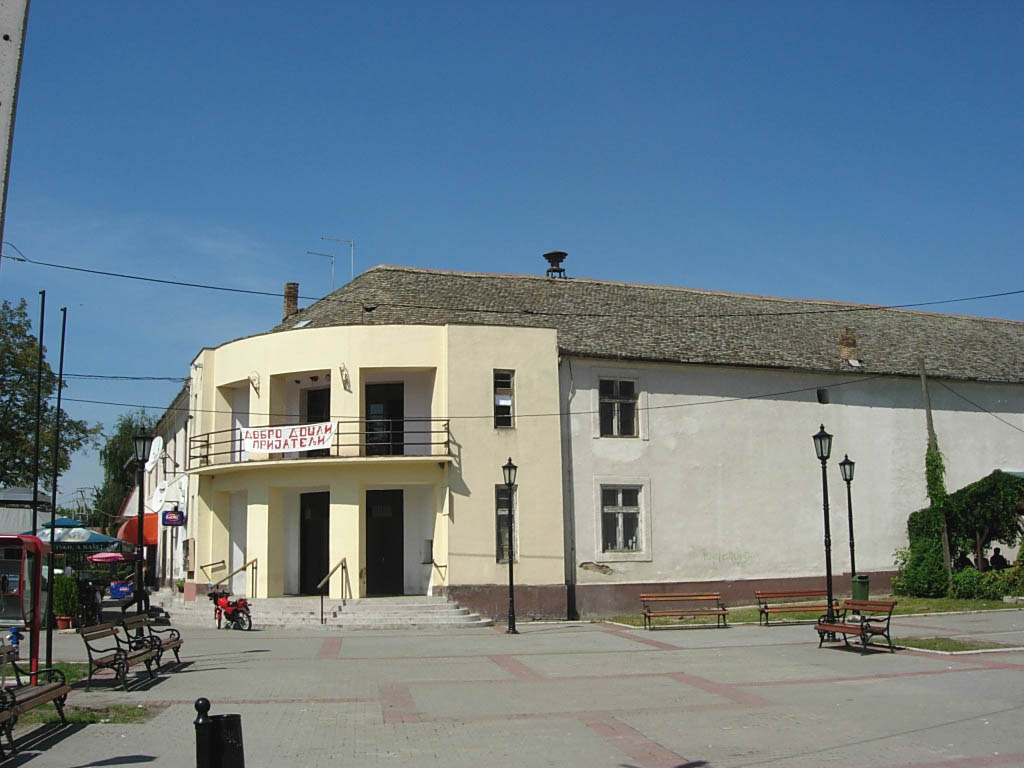
Center of local municipality

== See also ==
- List of places in Serbia
- List of cities, towns and villages in Vojvodina
