= Macedonians in Serbia =

Македонци у Србији Македонци во Србија
- Ethnic flag of Macedonians in Serbia

Total population
- 14,767 (2022)

Regions with significant populations
- Vojvodina: 7,021
- Belgrade: 4,293

Languages
- Serbian and Macedonian

Religion
- Eastern Orthodoxy

Related ethnic groups
- South Slavs

Macedonians are a recognized ethnic minority in Serbia. According to data from the 2022 census, the population of ethnic Macedonians in Serbia is 14,767, constituting 0.2% of the total population. The vast majority of them live in Belgrade and South Banat District.

== History ==
The first session of the Anti-fascist Assembly for the National Liberation of Macedonia (ASNOM) was held on 2 August 1944, clandestinely in the Bulgarian occupation zone of Yugoslavia, at Prohor Pčinjski Monastery, in present-day territory of Serbia. The Assembly declared a Macedonian state within Yugoslavia and called for the "unification of the whole Macedonian people" across the entire region of Macedonia. The monastery proper was initially ceded after World War II to the Socialist Republic of Macedonia, but was transferred to the Socialist Republic of Serbia in 1945.

In Maglić, in Bačka region, a center for refugees of the Greek Civil War operated from 1945 through 1949. Among the refugees settled here were mainly Slavic speakers of Greek Macedonia.

Due to economic reasons, many Macedonians migrated during the 1960s and 1970s to the Serbia (predominantly to Vojvodina).

== Demographics ==
According to the 2022 census there were 14,767 Macedonians in Serbia. The Macedonian population is concentrated in two cities, Belgrade and Pančevo. In Belgrade region there are 4,293 Macedonians, while in neighboring Pančevo 3,020 - out of which vast majority live in three villages (Jabuka, Glogonj, and Kačarevo) that are within administrative limits of City of Pančevo. Additionally, Macedonians constitute 7.7% population of the municipality of Plandište (particularly in village of Dužine), where Macedonian language is in the official use.

Historical population
| Year | Pop. | ±% |
|---|---|---|
| 1948 | 17,907 | — |
| 1953 | 27,277 | +52.3% |
| 1961 | 36,288 | +33.0% |
| 1971 | 42,675 | +17.6% |
| 1981 | 48,986 | +14.8% |
| 1991 | 45,068 | −8.0% |
| 2002 | 25,847 | −42.6% |
| 2011 | 22,755 | −12.0% |
| 2022 | 14,767 | −35.1% |
Since 2002, excluding Kosovo; Source:

Macedonians in selected South Banat settlements per censuses:

| Settlement | Municipality | 1981 | Share | 2002 | Share | 2022 | Share |
|---|---|---|---|---|---|---|---|
| Dužine | Plandište | 90 | 31.9% | 68 | 31.1% | 23 | 27% |
| Glogonj | Pančevo | 1,201 | 33.3% | 367 | 11.5% | 187 | 7% |
| Gudurica | Vršac | 192 | 13.3% | 133 | 10.5% | 62 | 7% |
| Hajdučica | Plandište | 155 | 10.2% | 123 | 8.9% | 72 | 8.7% |
| Kačarevo | Pančevo | 3,205 | 38.6% | 1,467 | 19% | 710 | 11.2% |
| Jabuka | Pančevo | 4,179 | 64.8% | 2,054 | 32.5% | 1,339 | 23.7% |
| Pančevo | Pančevo | 1,662 | 2.4% | 1,196 | 1.6% | 661 | 0.9% |
| Plandište | Plandište | 1,027 | 24.9% | 910 | 21.3% | 478 | 14.3% |
| Velika Greda | Plandište | 163 | 10.3% | 136 | 9.9% | 73 | 7.9% |

== Politics ==
The National Council of Macedonian Ethnic Minority in Serbia is a representation body of Macedonians, established for the protection of the rights and the minority self-government of Macedonians in Serbia.

The Democratic Party of Macedonians is the ethnic minority party representing interests of Macedonians in Serbia.

== Culture ==
There is a monthly political journal Makedonska videlina produced by the Macedonian Information and Publishing Centre in Pančevo. Limited Macedonian-language television is available through regional public broadcaster of Radio Television of Vojvodina and the local station TV Pančevo.

== Notable people ==
- Vlada Avramov – football player
- Tijana Dapčević – singer
- Aleksandar Džambazov – conductor and composer
- Boško Gjurovski – football player and manager
- Bogomil Gjuzel – poet, writer, playwright, and translator
- Vladimir Gligorov – economist
- Zafir Hadžimanov – musician
- Aleksandar Ignjovski – football player
- Aleksandar Lazevski – football player
- Dragan Lukovski – basketball player
- Maja Odžaklievska – singer
- Lazar Ristovski – actor, producer, and director
- Milan Stojanoski – football player and manager
- Dragoslav Šekularac – football player and manager

== See also ==
- Macedonian diaspora
- North Macedonia–Serbia relations
