= Josef Wüst =

Austrian journalist, editor-in-chief and publisher

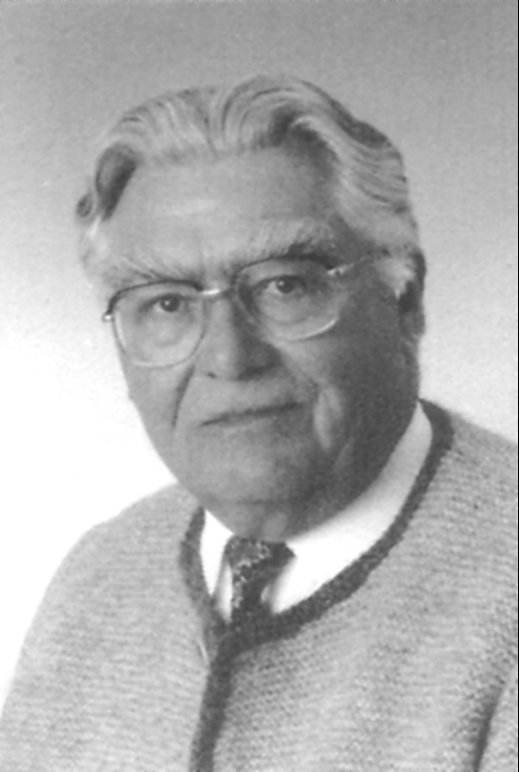
- Josef Wüst in 1995
- Born: 11 March 1925; Velika Greda, Kingdom of Serbs, Croats, and Slovenes
- Died: 19 February 2003 (aged 77); Sankt Andrä im Lungau, Austria
- Citizenship: Austria
- Education: University of Vienna (Dr., 1954)
- Occupations: Journalist, editor-in-chief and publisher
- Spouse: Helga Wüst
- Children: 4

Josef Wüst (11 March 1925 – 19 February 2003) was an Austrian journalist, editor-in-chief and publisher.

== Early life and education ==
Josef Wüst was born in Velika Greda, Podunavlje Oblast, Kingdom of Serbs, Croats, and Slovenes, the third child of the Wüst family, and spent his early life together with his siblings Franz and Elisabeth on their parents' farm. He was in secondary school in the nearby town of Vršac during World War II when the Balkan Campaign began in 1941 in the then Kingdom of Yugoslavia, and the language of education changed from Serbian to German.

In fall 1944 Germans had to flee from the Banat; Josef's father was killed and the family were dispossessed of all their belongings. His brother joined combat units, while his mother and sister were interned in Serbian camps. Josef managed to escape with his school class by way of Budapest and Vienna to Sankt Pölten, where he graduated from the teacher training college. Continuing his journey, he became caught between the closing East and West fronts in the Czechoslovak Republic. After barely surviving, he tried to return to his hometown on foot. Being arrested and freed several times, he successfully crossed the Alps and reached Carinthia. There he was taken into the custody of the British army and was informed of the fate of his hometown. After his release he became an elementary school teacher in Carinthia. Meanwhile, his mother and sister had arrived in Vienna and were able to make contact with him through the refugee relief program of the Austrian Caritas organization.

To reunite with them, in November 1945 Wüst moved to Vienna, where he made a living as a shoemaker. He enrolled in the faculty of philosophy at the University of Vienna on 6 October 1948. On 26 September 1950 he changed his focus of study to journalism. During his studies he spent six months in Madrid on a scholarship, but returning from Spain to Vienna, he only had enough money to reach Salzburg, where he found work with the US army. During his time in Salzburg he also joined the Catholic fraternity K.Ö.H.V. Rheno-Juvavia Salzburg. Once back in Vienna he joined the affiliated K.Ö.H.V. Saxo-Bavaria Prag, and on 22 December 1954 he graduated from the university. His doctoral dissertation is on the beginning of letterpress in the Banat.

== Career ==
After graduation Wüst worked as a freelancer at a publishing house, the Österreichischer Wirtschaftsverlag (Austrian business press) and as a courier. In 1958 his position at the publisher became permanent; he worked there as a journalist and editor-in-chief until 1985, during which time he supervised its journals for the sporting goods, joiner, master carpenter, electronics, butcher and automobile branches.

== Personal life ==
Josef Wüst became an Austrian citizen on 5 February 1951. On 13 July 1957 he married Helga Hoch; they had four children. He died on 19 February 2003 in Lintsching, in the Lungau.

== Honours and awards ==
- 1981 Honorary certificate for 25 years' membership in the Schwabenverein, Vienna
- 1982 Gold badge of honor of the professional association of the Styrian meat sector
- 1983 Bronze employee medal for 25 years' employment with the Österreichischer Wirtschaftsverlag
- 1985 Letter of thanks from the professional association of the Viennese motor mechanic sector
- 1985 Gold badge of honor of the professional association of the Austrian meat sector
- 1985 Silver badge of honor of the Motor Press Club of Austria
- 1985 Gold badge of honor of the professional association of the Lower Austrian motor mechanic sector
- 1985 Gold medal of the Republic of Austria
- 1986 Gold badge of honor of the professional association of the Salzburg motor mechanic sector

== Publications ==
In 1991 Wüst published Verlorene Heimat Georgshausen, describing life in a small village of Danube Swabians in Banat from 1849 to 1945. An English translation, Lost Homeland Georgshausen, was published in March 2008.

The newspaper Unser Dorftrommler (December 1991 – November 2002) focused on informing former citizens of Georgshausen and their descendants about the past village life, as well as distributing recent news.

At the end of the last century Wüst created together with the councilmen of the three villages Georgshausen, Setschanfeld and Altlez the website www.drei-doerfer-im-banat.de. In 2020 the website was revised and moved to www.georgshausen.com.
