= Barice, Serbia =

Barice Барице (Serbian) Sân Ianăș (Romanian)
- Village (Selo)
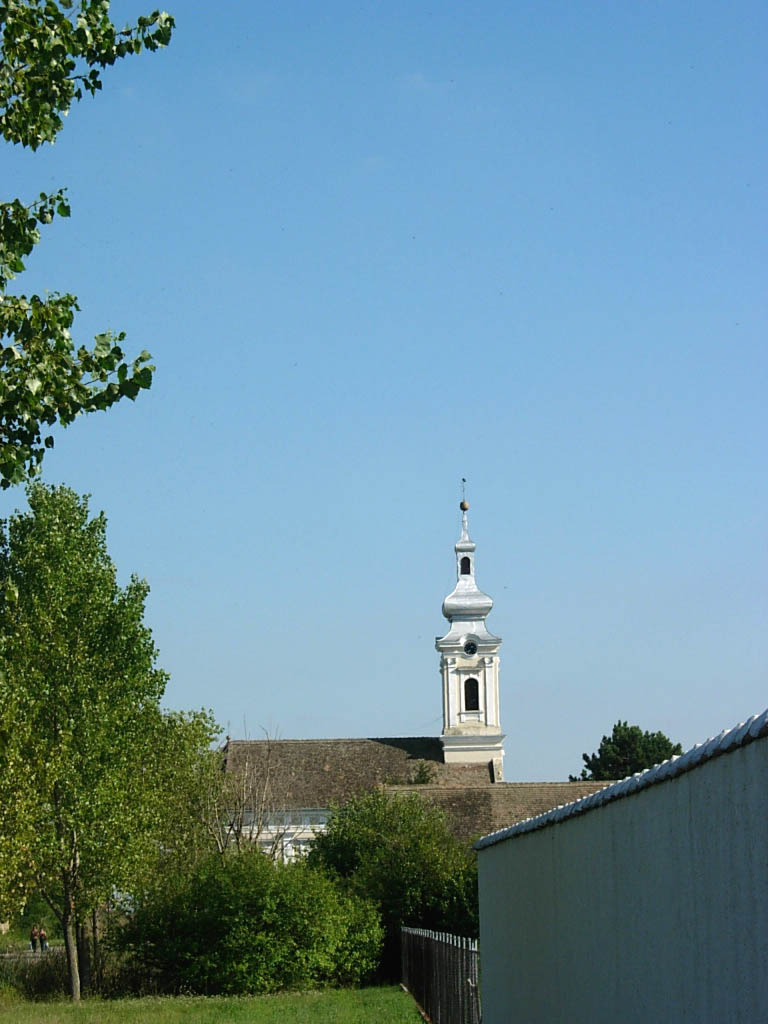
- The Romanian Orthodox Church

- Location of Barice within Serbia Barice (Serbia) Barice (Europe)
- Coordinates: 45°10′00″N 21°04′01″E
- Country: Serbia
- Province: Vojvodina
- District: South Banat
- Municipality: Plandište
- Elevation: 76 m (249 ft)

Population (2022)
  - Barice: 364
- Time zone: UTC+1 (CET)
  - Summer (DST): UTC+2 (CEST)
- Postal code: 26367
- Area code: +381(0)13
- Car plates: VŠ

Barice (Serbian Cyrillic: Барице; Romanian: Sân Ianăș) is a village located in the Plandište municipality, South Banat District, Vojvodina, Serbia. The village has a population of 364 people (2022 census).

== History ==
Barice was officially mentioned for the first time in 1713 under the name Janoš. In 1717, the village changed its name to Saint Janoš, and in 1922 it received its Serbian name Sveti Jovan. After the Second World War, the village got its current name of Barice.

According to the notes of Pope Ioan Neagoe, the municipality was called St. Janos and it was founded before the Turks came to these areas, back in 1521, when the descendants of Barice came as colonists from the areas of Vechiul Regat and Ardeal in the spring of the same year. The first inhabitants, the founders of St. Janos, settled near the bridge called Pietri, which is located in the atar of Jermenovci, where a wooden cross is preserved to this day. They lived there for 64 years, until 1585, when, in fear of Turkish attacks, they moved to another place that was surrounded by reeds and bushes, sheltered, where the municipality is still located, wrote the priest Neagoe. The first church was built of logs and the locals dragged it with 20 oxen when moving to a new place. Services were held in that church for 311 years. The houses were built without any order, scattered in all directions. It was like that until 1789, when the municipality got its current appearance. The village of St. Janos is mentioned in the Serbian register of contributions of the Patriarchate of Peć, covering the period from 1660 to 1666, as a contributor to the Patriarchate.

The first priest, who together with the founders and the first families who settled in the village from Transylvania, was Radu Neagoe. Ioan Neagoe transmitted these historical data, which, as he himself wrote, were recorded in old church records that were destroyed in battles associated with the national liberation uprisings in the Austro-Hungarian Empire in 1848. In his book "Romanians in the Serbian Part of the Banat", Dr. Gligor Popi states that the village of St. Janos suffered during the battles associated with the national liberation uprisings in the Austro-Hungarian Empire 1848–1849. The inhabitants had abandoned the village between September 13, 1848, and January 20, 1849; upon their return, they found the village in ruins.

== Demographics ==
=== Historical population ===
- 1961: 1,331
- 1971: 1,259
- 1981: 1,044
- 1991: 887
- 2002: 598
- 2022: 364

=== Ethnic groups ===
According to data from the 2022 census, ethnic groups in the village include:

- 299 (82%) Romanians
- 45 (12.3%) Serbs
- Others/Undeclared/Unknown

== See also ==
- List of places in Serbia
- List of cities, towns and villages in Vojvodina
