= Kupinik =

Kupinik can refer to:

- Kupinik (Plandište), a village in Banat, Vojvodina, Serbia.
- Kupinik (fortress), a medieval fortress, near modern village Kupinovo in the region of Srem, Serbia.
