= Margita =

Margita can refer to:

- Margita, a village near Plandište, Vojvodina, Serbia.
- Margita or Sankt Margarethen im Burgenland, a town near Eisenstadt, Burgenland, Austria.
- Margaret in Balkan languages
