= Markovićevo =

Markovićevo Марковићево
- Village (Selo)
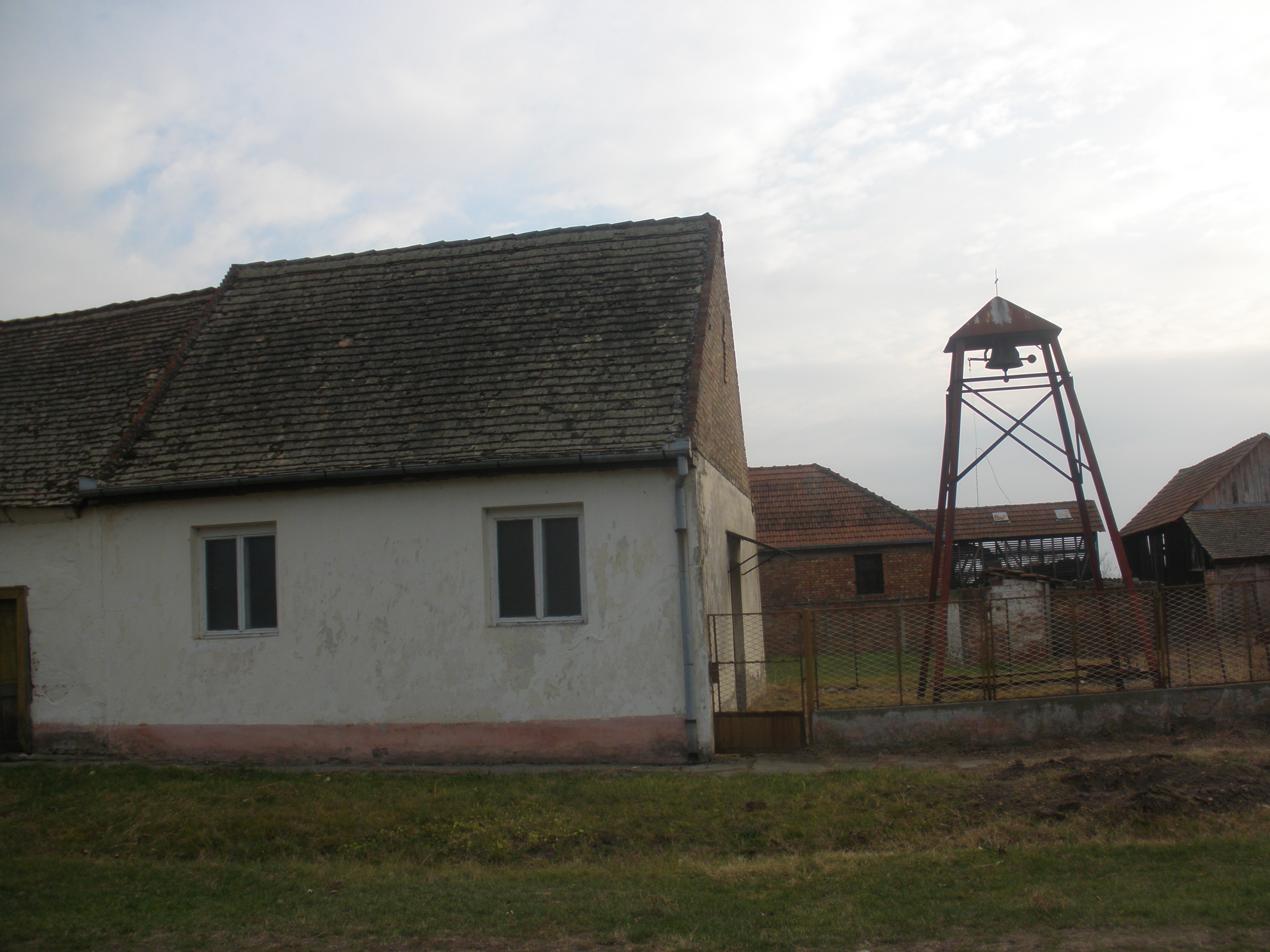
- Catholic chapel of Saint Catherine of Alexandria (1977)

- Location of Markovićevo within Serbia Markovićevo (Serbia) Markovićevo (Europe)
- Coordinates: 45°19′08″N 21°01′35″E
- Country: Serbia
- Province: Vojvodina
- District: South Banat
- Municipality: Plandište
- Elevation: 74 m (243 ft)

Population (2002)
  - Markovićevo: 216
- Time zone: UTC+1 (CET)
  - Summer (DST): UTC+2 (CEST)
- Area code: +381(0)13
- Car plates: VŠ

Markovićevo (Serbian Cyrillic: Марковићево; Romanian: Crivobara) is a village in Serbia. It is situated in the Plandište municipality, South Banat District, Vojvodina province.

== Name ==
Older Serbian name for the village was Kriva Bara (Крива Бара). In Hungarian the village is known as Torontálújfalu (Formerly also Ujfalu and Torontal-Ujfalu). In Romanian, the name is Crivobara; the village was in the Kingdom of Romania until 1923.

== Demographics ==
The village has a Serb ethnic majority (70,37%) with a sizable Hungarian minority (21,29%) and its population numbering 216 people (2002 census).

== Historical population ==
- 1961: 505
- 1971: 420
- 1981: 310
- 1991: 239
- 2002: 216

== See also ==
- List of places in Serbia
- List of cities, towns and villages in Vojvodina
