= Laudonovac =

Laudonovac Лаудоновац
- Village (Selo)
- Location of Laudonovac within Serbia Laudonovac (Serbia) Laudonovac (Europe)
- Coordinates: 45°10′31″N 21°08′27″E
- Country: Serbia
- Province: Vojvodina
- District: South Banat
- Municipality: Plandište
- Elevation: 77 m (253 ft)

Population (2022)
  - Laudonovac: 10
- Time zone: UTC+1 (CET)
  - Summer (DST): UTC+2 (CEST)
- Area code: +381(0)13
- Car plates: VŠ

Laudonovac (Serbian Cyrillic: Лаудоновац) is a village in Plandište municipality, South Banat District,Vojvodina province, Serbia. The village has a Serb ethnic majority (66.67%) with Romanian (16.67%) and Macedonian (8.33%) minorities. Its population was 24 people in the 2002 census.

== Historical population ==
- 1981: 78
- 1991: 50
- 2002: 24
- 2011: 21
- 2022: 10

== See also ==
- List of places in Serbia
- List of cities, towns and villages in Vojvodina
