= Hajdučica =

Hajdučica Хајдучица (Serbian) Hajdušica (Slovak)
- Village (Selo)
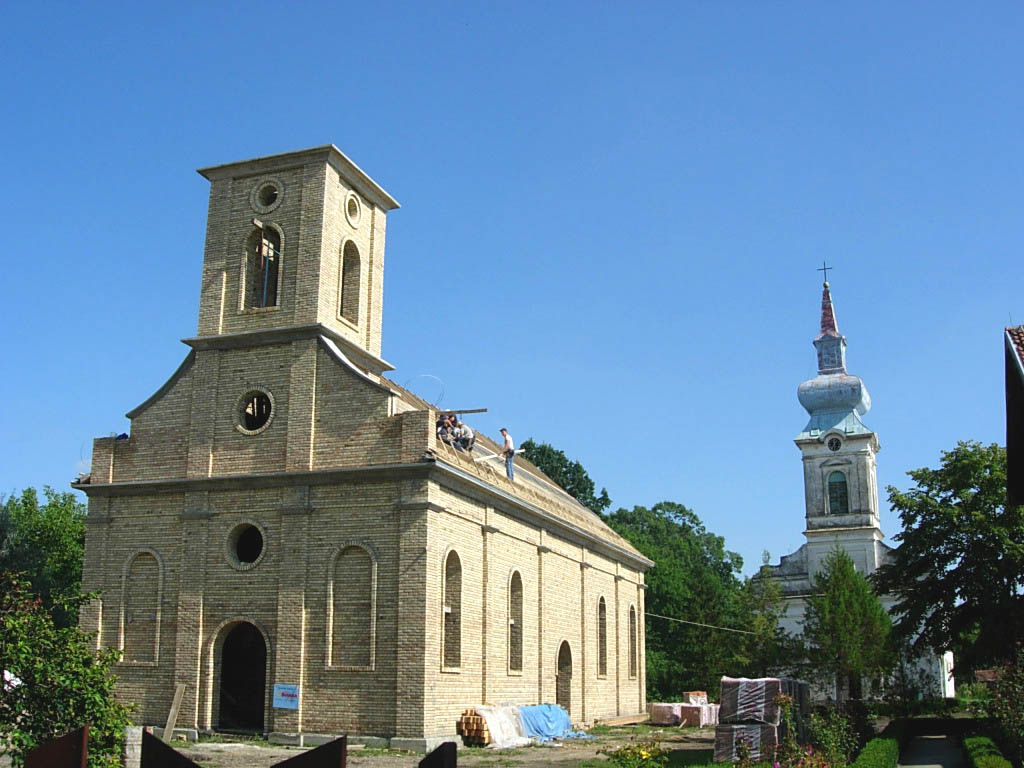
- The Evangelical (Slovak) churches, the new under construction and the old one

- Location of Hajdučica within Serbia Hajdučica (Serbia) Hajdučica (Europe)
- Coordinates: 45°14′34″N 20°57′16″E
- Country: Serbia
- Province: Vojvodina
- District: South Banat
- Municipality: Plandište
- Elevation: 75 m (246 ft)

Population (2022)
  - Hajdučica: 829
- Time zone: UTC+1 (CET)
  - Summer (DST): UTC+2 (CEST)
- Postal code: 26370
- Area code: +381(0)13
- Car plates: VŠ

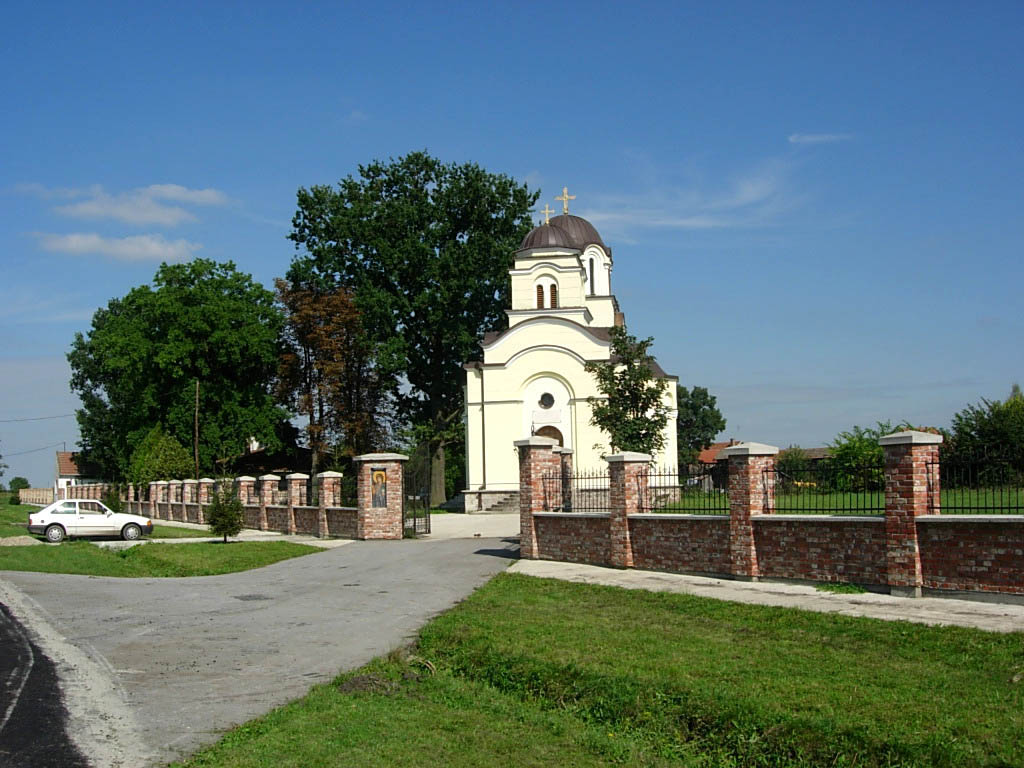
The Hajdučica Orthodox monastery.

Hajdučica (Serbian Cyrillic: Хајдучица, German: Haiduschitza, Slovak: Hajdušica) is a village located in the Plandište municipality, South Banat District, Vojvodina, Serbia. The village has a population of 829 people (2022 census).

== Name ==
In Serbian the village is known as Hajdučica/Хајдучица, in Slovak as Hajdušica, in Romanian as Haiducița, in Hungarian as Istvánvölgy, and in German as Heidschütz or Heideschüte.

== Demographics ==
=== Historical population ===
- 1961: 1,880
- 1971: 1,831
- 1981: 1,519
- 1991: 1,456
- 2002: 1,375
- 2011: 1,150
- 2022: 829

=== Ethnic groups ===
According to data from the 2022 census, ethnic groups in the village include:

- 302 (36.4%) Slovaks
- 267 (32.2%) Serbs
- 80 (9.9%) Hungarians
- Others/Undeclared/Unknown

== Culture ==
There is a Hajdučica Orthodox monastery situated in the area.

== See also ==
- List of places in Serbia
- List of cities, towns and villages in Vojvodina
