= Miletićevo =

Miletićevo Милетићево
- Village (Selo)
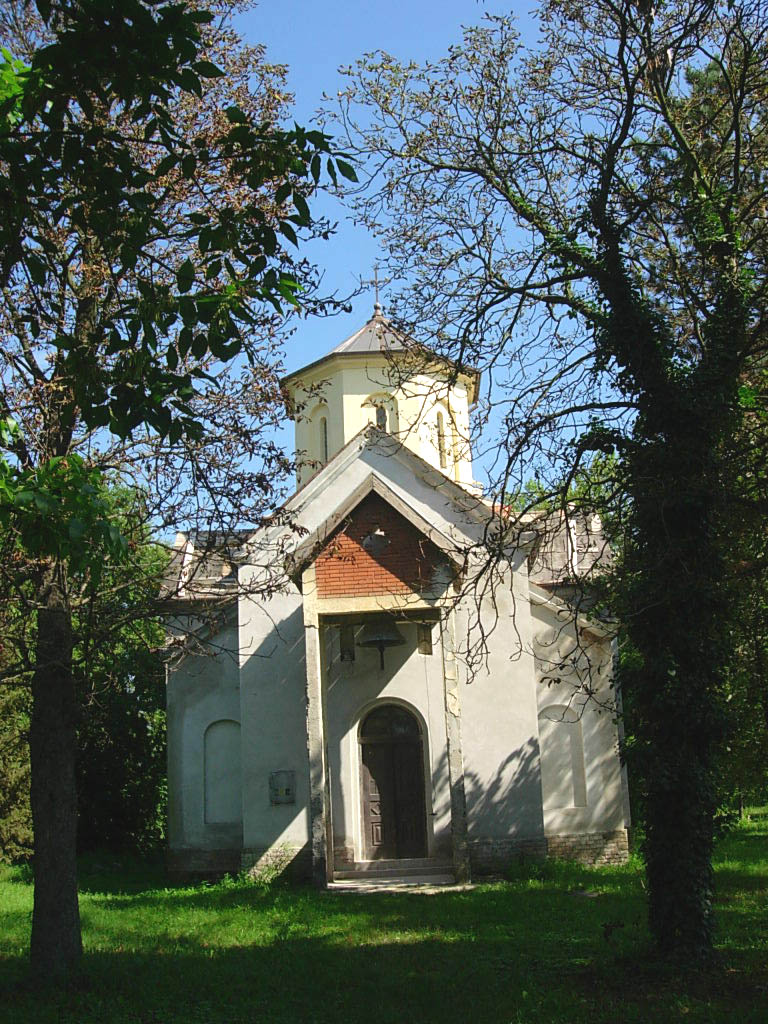
- The Orthodox Church

- Location of Miletićevo within Serbia Miletićevo (Serbia) Miletićevo (Europe)
- Coordinates: 45°18′13″N 21°03′31″E
- Country: Serbia
- Province: Vojvodina
- District: South Banat
- Municipality: Plandište
- Elevation: 75 m (246 ft)

Population (2011)
  - Miletićevo: 497
- Time zone: UTC+1 (CET)
  - Summer (DST): UTC+2 (CEST)
- Postal code: 26373
- Area code: +381(0)13
- Car plates: VŠ

Miletićevo (Serbian Cyrillic: Милетићево) is a village located in the Plandište municipality, in the South Banat District, Vojvodina, Serbia. As of 2011, the village has a population of 497 inhabitants.

== Name ==
In Serbian, the village is known as Miletićevo (Милетићево), in Hungarian as Ráróspuszta, and in Croatian as Miletićevo.

== Demographics ==
Historical population
Year	Pop.	±% p.a.
1948	1,528	—
1953	1,510	−0.24%
1961	1,323	−1.64%
1971	1,025	−2.52%
1981	811	−2.31%
1991	650	−2.19%
2002	622	−0.40%
2011	497	−2.46%

According to the last official census done in 2011, the village of Miletićevo has 497 inhabitants.

== See also ==
- List of places in Serbia
- List of cities, towns and villages in Vojvodina
