= Kapetanovo =

Castle in Plandiste, Serbia

Kapetanovo Castle
- Дворац Капетаново/Dvorac Kapetanovo
- Stari Lec, Plandište municipality, Vojvodina, Serbia
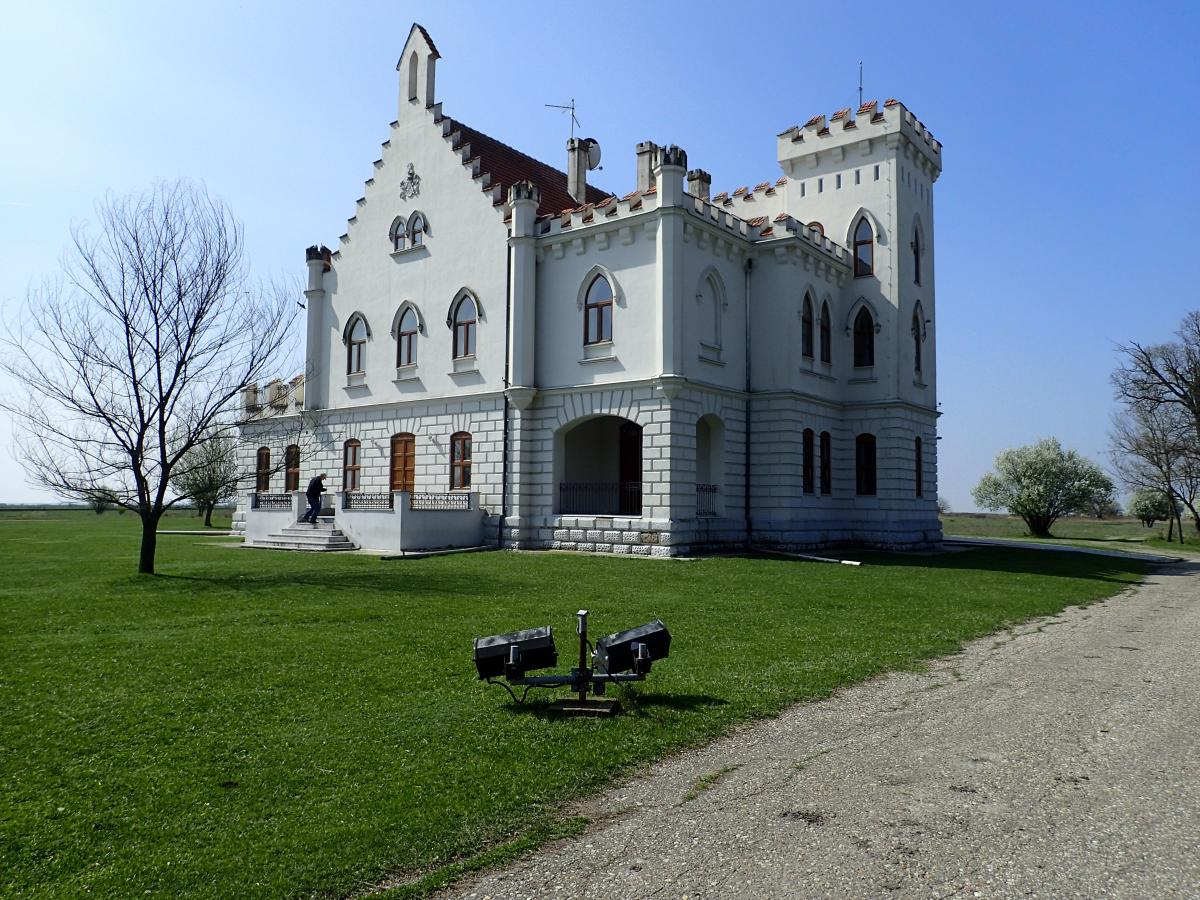
- Kapetanovo Castle

Site information
- Type: Castle
- Owner: Private owner
- Open to the public: Yes, used as a hotel
- Condition: Completely renovated

Location
- Shown within Serbia
- Coordinates: 45.272°N 20.936°E

Site history
- Built: 1904
- Built by: Ispán (Župan) Béla Botka

Kapetanovo (Serbian Cyrillic: Капетаново) is a Neo-Gothic castle located in the village of Stari Lec, in the Plandište municipality in northeastern Serbia. In 1991, it was included on the national list of monuments of culture of great importance, and since then it has been protected.

== History ==
The castle was built in 1904 by ispán of Torontál County (Kingdom of Hungary, Austria-Hungary) Béla Botka. He wanted to create a residence that would resemble a medieval castle, and that was one of the reasons for the construction of the neogothic palace. Kapetanovo is located near the road Vršac–Zrenjanin, about 2 km southwest from the small village of Stari Lec.

After losing almost all of his wealth on gambling, owner Béla decided to sell the castle, as the last possible solution to solve his financial situation. After he told his wife Ema about this, she was so devastated that on the night of 2 August 1938, she climbed to the highest tower of Kapetanovo, poured gasoline on herself and burned to death.

Nevertheless, in an auction in 1938, Kapetanovo was sold to a wealthy merchant Franc Maj. He purchased it as the main part of his daughter's dowry. After the wedding, she and her husband Milan Kapetanov moved in, and the castle took his name. During this time, Kapetanovo flourished. They created large fountains and gardens all around the castle compound, and the only part that was constantly locked was the tallest tower, where Emma Botka burned herself. Milan was Kapetanovo's owner up until the end of World War II; after the Law on Nationalization, the castle was seized by the communist Yugoslavia's government.

== Architecture ==
Kapetanovo Castle is an example of neogothic architecture. It has two entrances, and around it there was a spacious park (now defunct) with a fountain. One of the most specific architectural specifications is a crow-stepped gable stretching along three sides of castle. With simple white façade and an elevated entrance, the building's harmonious proportions are pointed out with high square towers with crenellation. All the windows have sharp gothic arches, and with false arrow loops on top of the tower, the architect's idea of creating a pseudo-medieval castle is clearly visible.

== Restoration ==
After the nationalization, the castle was mostly abandoned and empty for nearly 40 years. In 1987, reconstruction started, but it was soon abandoned after basic conservation work. Then, in August 2006, vast work on the restoration of the castle commenced, and it was renovated into a restaurant with a hotel. As the castle is under protection of the Serbian Academy of Sciences and Arts as a monuments of culture of great importance, the reconstruction was a faithful restoration of the original design.

== See also ==
- Monuments of Culture of Great Importance
- Tourism in Serbia
- Castles in Serbia
