= Hajdučica Monastery =

Monastery in Serbia

Coordinates: 45.25381°N 20.96601°E

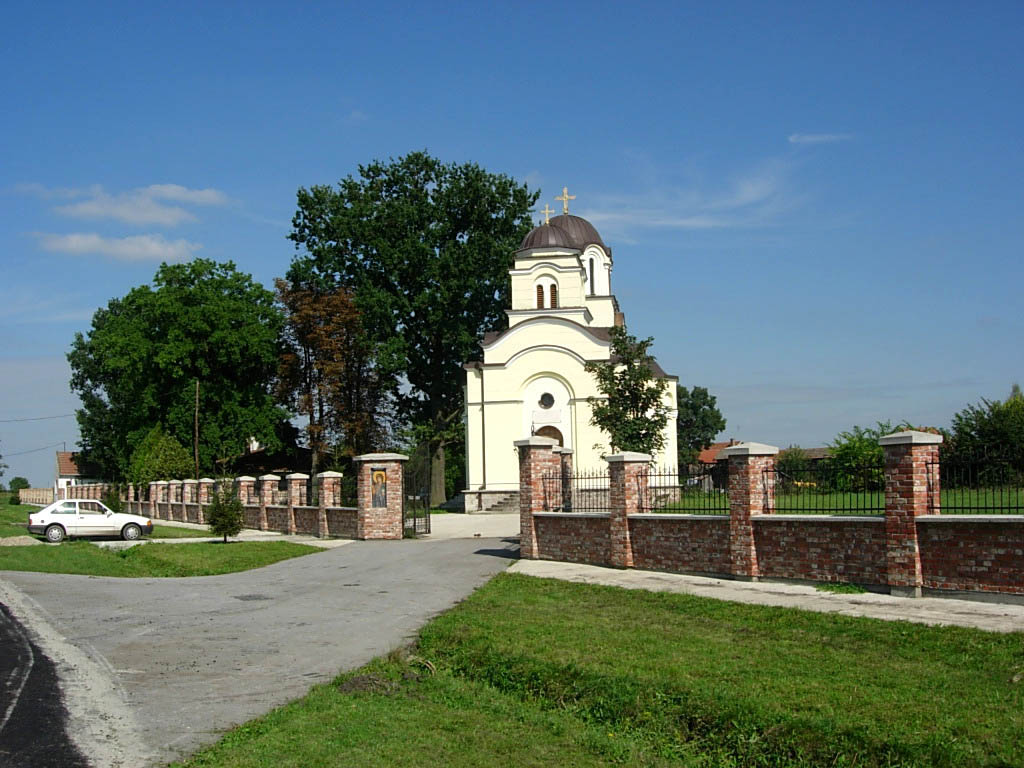
The Hajdučica monastery

The Hajdučica Monastery (Serbian: Манастир Хајдучица, romanized: Manastir Hajdučica) is a Serbian Orthodox monastery located in the Plandište municipality, in the Banat region in the northern Serbian province of Vojvodina. It was founded during the Kingdom of Yugoslavia in 1939 (87 years ago). It is now a nunnery, with nuns from the Mesić Monastery.

== See also ==
- List of Serbian Orthodox monasteries
