= Banatski Sokolac =

Banatski Sokolac Банатски Соколац
- Village (Selo)
- Location of Banatski Sokolac within Serbia Banatski Sokolac (Serbia) Banatski Sokolac (Europe)
- Coordinates: 45°15′00″N 21°04′00″E
- Country: Serbia
- Province: Vojvodina
- District: South Banat
- Municipality: Plandište
- Elevation: 77 m (253 ft)

Population (2002)
  - Banatski Sokolac: 366
- Time zone: UTC+1 (CET)
  - Summer (DST): UTC+2 (CEST)
- Area code: +381(0)13
- Car plates: VŠ

Banatski Sokolac (Serbian Cyrillic: Банатски Соколац) is a village located in the Plandište municipality, in the South Banat District of Serbia. It is situated in the Autonomous Province of Vojvodina. The village has a Serb ethnic majority (91,80%) and its population numbered 271 at the 2011 census. Sokolac is the site of the annual Rockvillage festival held in the local school yard; for this occasion many former residents pay a visit.

A statue of Bob Marley was placed in the village in September 2008.

== Historical population ==
- 1961: 728
- 1971: 622
- 1981: 458
- 1991: 369
- 2002: 366
- 2011: 271

== See also ==
- List of places in Serbia
- List of cities, towns and villages in Vojvodina
