= Veliki Gaj =

Veliki Gaj Велики Гај
- Village (Selo)
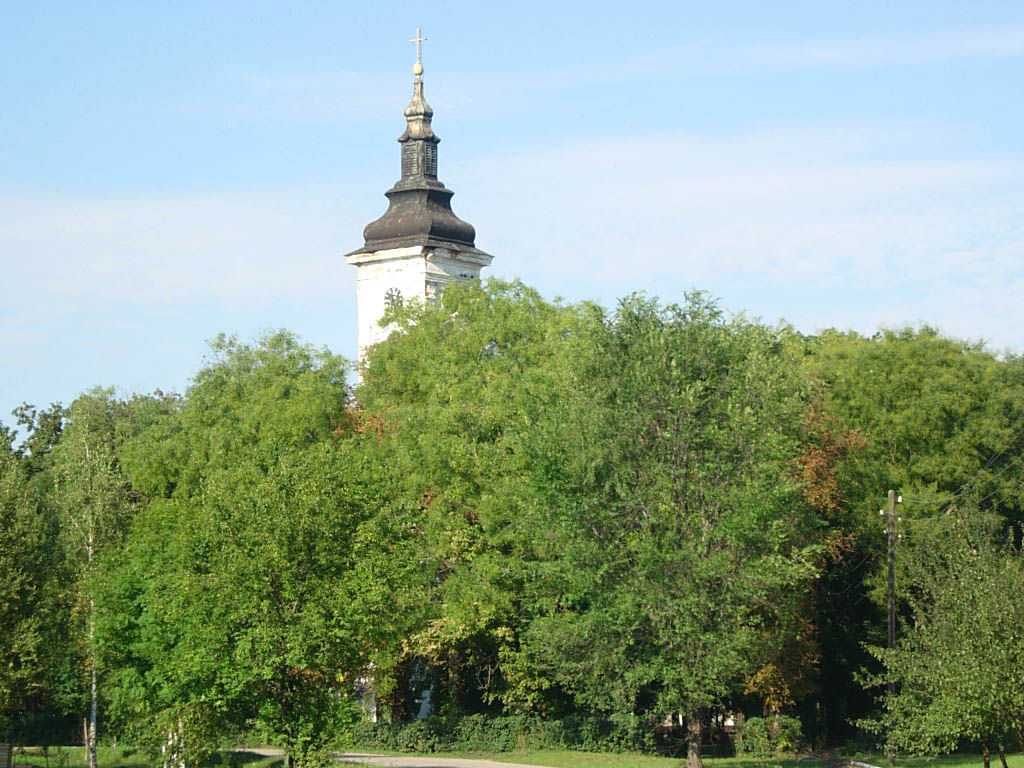
- The Orthodox Church

- Location of Veliki Gaj within Serbia Veliki Gaj (Serbia) Veliki Gaj (Europe)
- Coordinates: 45°17′05″N 21°10′13″E
- Country: Serbia
- Province: Vojvodina
- District: South Banat
- Municipality: Plandište
- Elevation: 80 m (260 ft)

Population (2002)
  - Veliki Gaj: 790
- Time zone: UTC+1 (CET)
  - Summer (DST): UTC+2 (CEST)
- Postal code: 26365
- Area code: +381(0)13
- Car plates: VŠ

Veliki Gaj (Serbian Cyrillic: Велики Гај) is a village located in the Plandište municipality, in the South Banat District of Serbia. It is situated in the Autonomous Province of Vojvodina. According to the 2002 census, the population of the village was 790 people, of whom 670 were ethnic Serbs (84.81%).

== Name ==
In Serbo-Croatian, the village is known as Veliki Gaj or Велики Гај, in German as Groß Gaj, in Hungarian as Nagygáj and in Romanian as Gaiu Mare.

== Geography ==
Veliki Gaj is located about 70 km NE of Belgrade and about 1 km SE of the Romanian border.

== History ==
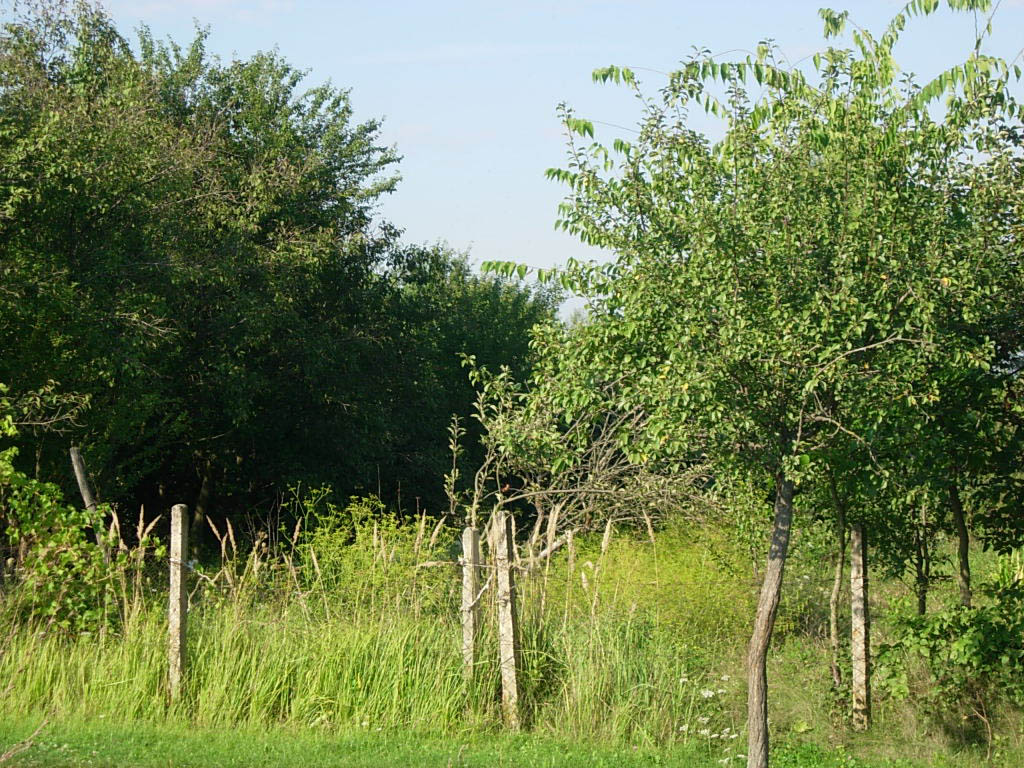
An orchard in the village.

The village was first mentioned in 1355 under name Gaj. In the 17th century, the name of the village was changed to Veliki Gaj. During the Ottoman rule (16th-17th century), the village was mostly populated by ethnic Serbs.

From 1716, the village was part of the Habsburg monarchy, which encouraged the settlement of German-speaking Donauschwaben (Danube Swabians) and others. In 1910, the population of the village numbered 2,930 inhabitants, including 1,456 Serbs, 743 Hungarians, and 620 Germans.

After the First World War, the village became part of the Kingdom of Serbs, Croats, and Slovenes (renamed to Yugoslavia in 1929). During the Second World War (1941–1944), the village was under Axis occupation, and was part of the autonomous Banat region within German-occupied Serbia.

After the war, the village was part of the new socialist Yugoslavia, within the Socialist Autonomous Province of Vojvodina and Socialist Republic of Serbia. The Germans and most Hungarians were expelled in 1944–45. In 1991, the village had 897 inhabitants, including 883 Serbs, and 14 ethnic Hungarians.

Since 1992, the village was part of the Federal Republic of Yugoslavia, that in 2003 was transformed into the State Union of Serbia and Montenegro. Since the dissolution of this state in June 2006, the village became part of an independent Serbia.

== Historical population ==
- 1869: 2,761
- 1910: 2,926
- 1931: 3,213
- 1961: 1,532
- 1971: 1,308
- 1981: 1,039
- 1991: 898
- 2002: 790

== See also ==
- List of places in Serbia
- List of cities, towns and villages in Vojvodina
