= Jermenovci =

Jermenovci Јермeновци Ürményháza
- Village (Selo)
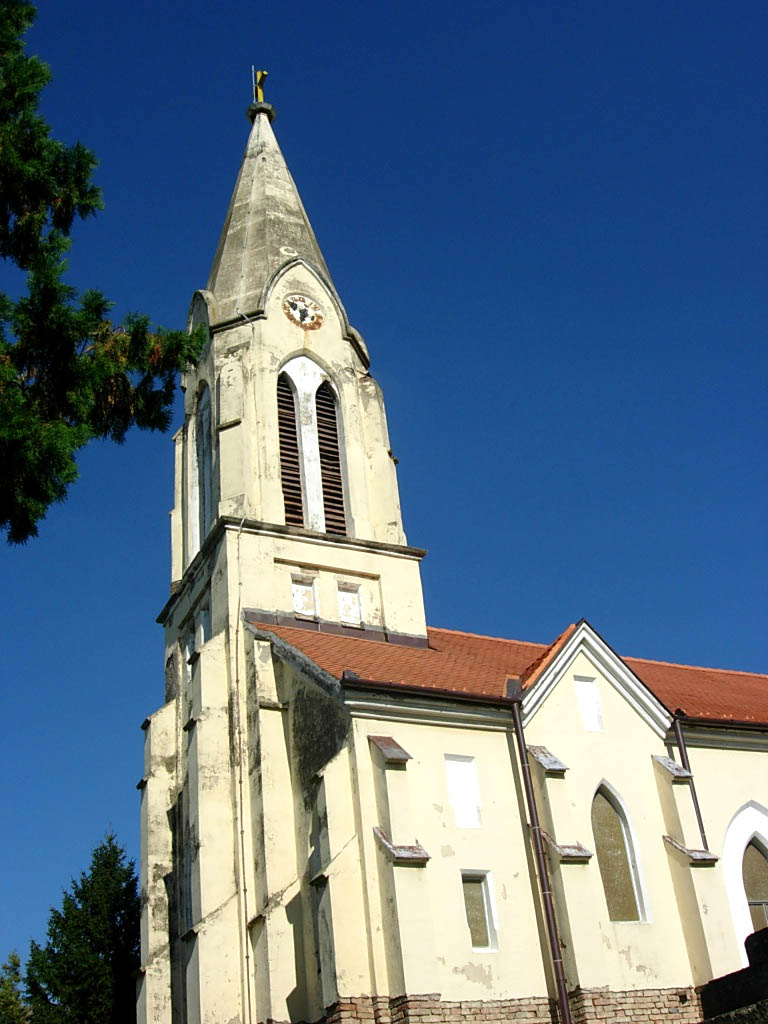
- The St. Ana, Mother of Blessed Virgin Mary Catholic Church

- Location within Vojvodina Location within Serbia Location within Europe
- Coordinates: 45°14′10″N 21°02′31″E
- Country: Serbia
- Province: Vojvodina
- District: South Banat
- Municipality: Plandište
- Elevation: 76 m (249 ft)

Population (2022)
  - Jermenovci: 614
- Time zone: UTC+1 (CET)
  - Summer (DST): UTC+2 (CEST)
- Postal code: 26363
- Area code: +381(0)13
- Car plates: VŠ

Jermenovci (Serbian: Jermenovci or Јермeновци; Hungarian: Ürményháza; German: Ürmenhausen) is a village located in the Plandište municipality, in the South Banat District of Serbia. It is situated in the Autonomous Province of Vojvodina. The village has a Hungarian ethnic majority (69.11%).

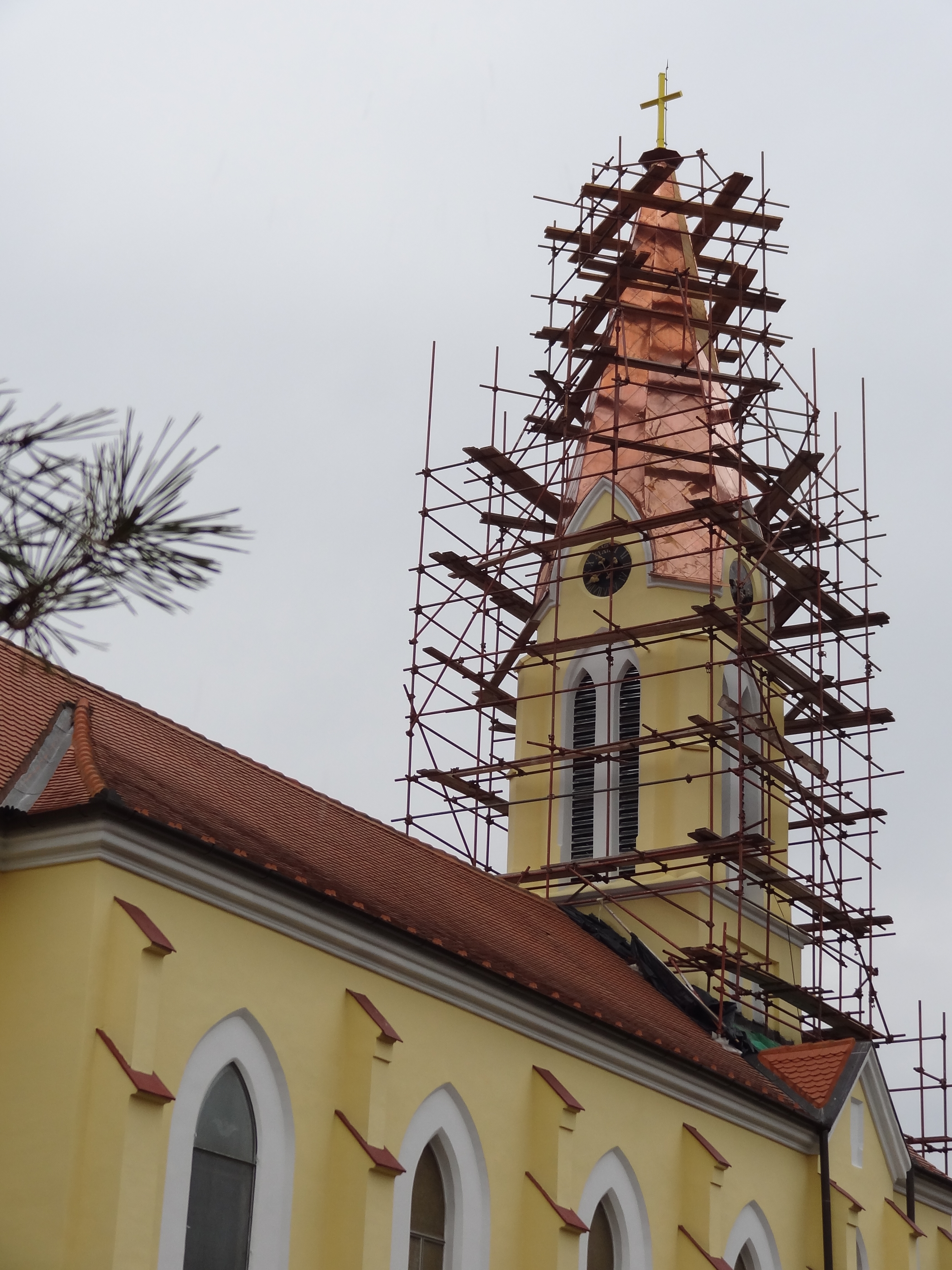
The St. Ana, Mother of Blessed Virgin Mary Catholic Church during renovations (18 December 2011)

== History ==
At the time of its foundation in 1817, the village was part of the Austrian Empire. It was administratively included into Torontal County within the Kingdom of Hungary (1526–1867) however the Austrian Empire ruled the Kingdom of Hungary. Draining of the marshlands prior to first human settlement necessitated the opening of the Maria Theresa Canal to bypass the future village of Ürmenhausen. In 1955, due to agricultural necessity to control recurrent flooding, this canal was widened and deepened to provide better drainage. With that improvement, the flow of water changed direction running from west to east. The name of the canal was changed to the DTD Canal (Danube–Tisa–Danube Canal), and it became a sector of this major waterway.

The first settlers of Ürmenhausen village were the handpicked 62 Roman Catholic Hungarian families that formed the nucleus population in 1817. These families had arrived from Majsa, Apátfalva, and Rákospuszta. Sixty families received titled deeds for arable land and dwelling whereas two received deeds for housing land only. The original freehold title holders were primarily engaged in agriculture, animal husbandry and in growing of tobacco plant. On September 23, 1848, during the historic Hungarian national revolution, Serbian rebels attacked the village and the defending local Hungarian inhabitants who, following resistance, had to flee as Ürményháza was torched. The village population returned by 1850 upon restoration of law and order. In 1848 and 1849, the village was part of the autonomous Serbian Vojvodina and from 1849 to 1860 it was part of the Voivodeship of Serbia and Banat of Temeschwar, a Habsburg crown land. After the abolition of the voivodeship in 1860, the village was included into the restored Torontal County, under the charter of Austrian Crown lands. In 1867, when the Austrian Empire was transformed into the Dual Monarchy of Austria-Hungary, this village became part of Transleithania or the Hungarian-governed part of the Dual Monarchy and the Hungarian name “Ürményháza” became its official appellation. Following the collapse of the Monarchy in 1918, the village became part of the Kingdom of Serbia and subsequently part of the Kingdom of Serbs, Croats and Slovenes (later renamed to Yugoslavia). Since that time, the Serbian name version “Irmenjhaza” (Ирмењхаза) was used as the official name. In 1921, the Serbian name was changed to “Jermenovci” (Јерменовци). It was, however, still unofficially called Ürményháza by local Hungarians.

The population grew until 1931 despite emigration to faraway lands but remained a predominantly ethnic Hungarian enclave to 2002 with its bilingual village folk. After World War II, the population of the village decreased.

The oil surveying began in 1951. The first oil well became operational on 9 November 1952, while the continuous production began in 1956, uninterrupted until today (2018). It is significant as the first oil field in Vojvodina.

== The name and its origin ==
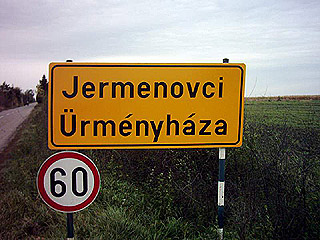
Road sign showing both Serbian and Hungarian names

Built on dried and reclaimed vacant state property marshlands, the village was named “Ürmenhausen” / “Ürményháza” / “Irmenjhaza” (Ирмењхаза) in 1817, in deference to its virtual founding father, the Hungarian nobleman and Crown Counsellor Ferenc Ürményi (1780–1880), director of the Treasury’s Crown Lands Department in Temeschwar / Timișoara (in today’s Romania).

The German, Hungarian and Serbian names for the village were officially used in various time periods. The older Serbian name “Irmenjhaza” (Ирмењхаза) was changed to “Jermenovci” (Јерменовци) in 1921.

=== Names through history ===
Historical population
Year	Pop.	±%
1948	1,724	—
1953	1,714	−0.6%
1961	1,792	+4.6%
1971	1,672	−6.7%
1981	1,454	−13.0%
1991	1,158	−20.4%
2002	1,033	−10.8%
2011	905	−12.4%
2022	614	−32.2%

Chronology, appellation, supreme rulers of the general territory and township administration:

- 1817–1867: Ürmenhausen – Austrian Empire – Kingdom of Hungary – Local County Administration
- 1867–1918: Ürményháza – Austro-Hungarian Empire – Kingdom of Hungary – Local County Administration on Hungarian Crown land.
- 1918: Irmenjhaza (Ирмењхаза) – Kingdom of Serbia – Banat, Bačka and Baranja – Local District Administration
- 1918–1921: Irmenjhaza (Ирмењхаза) – Kingdom of Serbs, Croats and Slovenes – Local District Administration
- 1921–1941: Jermenovci (Јерменовци) – Kingdom of Serbs, Croats and Slovenes (Kingdom of Yugoslavia) – Local District, Oblast and Banovina Administration
- 1941–1944: Jermenovci (Јерменовци) – Serbia – Local Banovina and District Administration
- 1944–1992: Jermenovci (Јерменовци) – Federal Republic of Yugoslavia – Local Provincial Administration
- 1992–2006: Jermenovci (Јерменовци) – Yugoslavia (Serbia and Montenegro) – Local Provincial Administration
- After 2006: Jermenovci (Јерменовци) – Republic of Serbia – Local Provincial Administration

=== Notes ===
Ürmény (Slovak: Urmín) was the pre-1918 Hungarian name of today's Mojmirovce village in Nitra County in Slovakia. Jermenovci/Ürményháza’s name is related to Ürmény through the name of István Ürményi, the paternal grandfather of Ferenc Ürményi (1780–1858), the founder of Jermenovci in 1817. István, an aristocrat and landed Crown Counselor, was born in the early 18th century as István Kiss-Ilméry in the village of Ürmény (Slovak: Urmín, renamed Mojmirovce since 1920) in present-day Slovakia, which in that time was under Austrian and Hungarian rule. He replaced his surname and adopted the new family name "Ürményi" by imperial charter in the 18th century, officially entering the ranks of family crested nobility. The Ürményi family's ancestral manor-house built in the 19th century by József Ürményi I (son of István) has been the landmark Ürményi Kastély (Ürményi Castle/Palace) at Vál, located halfway between Budapest and Székesfehérvár in Hungary. Ürményi was an eminent family name of Hungarian nobility with branches in Budapest, Slovakia, Serbia, Romania and their descendants across the world.

== Geography ==
The nearest populated areas are Plandište (8 km), Vršac (21 km). The village is 62 km northeast from the capital, Belgrade.

== Social Activities ==
Five associations cultivate and maintain the Hungarian social and cultural heritage through the Ürményházi Ifjúsági Klub (Youth club), the Polgárok Társulása (Citizens fellowship), the Ürményházi Hagyományápoló Kör (Heritage care circle), the Ürményházi Petőfi Sándor Művelődési Egyesület (Petőfi Sándor cultural association) and the Pipacs Nőegylet (Red Poppy Lady Embroiderers Club). The village is part of the Roman Catholic Communities Network (Katolikus Közösségek Hálozata) of South Banat, and thus occasionally partakes in social get-togethers of the districts within the province. The village has robust ties in every field with Hungarian organisations in Vojvodina, with Hungary and with other Hungarian communities outside Hungary through the bonds of language, root culture, common heritage and ethnicity.

== Notable Places and Activities ==
- R.C. Church of Szent Anna ( Church of St. Ann, Blessed Mother of the Virgin Mary ), Boldog Szűz Mária Édesanyja Szent Anna katolikus templom. Built in 1834–35, this church burned down but was reconstructed and reconsecrated in 1854.
- Mineral springs, confirmed therapeutic thermal and radio-active underground mud pools discovered in the area in 1973 yet to be developed
- Marginal crude oil industry visible through extraction pumps in the countryside
- Good fishing in the Danube–Tisa–Danube canal

== Major ethnic groups ==
Year	Total	Hungarians	Serbs	Slovaks	Yugoslavs	Romanians	Romani	Undecided	Unknown
1991	1,158	75.21%	7.25%	5.09%	3.28%	2.07%	1.72%	>0,10%	2.15%
2002	1,033	69.11%	10.93%	6.19%	1.93%	1.83%	1.64%	4.54%	2.03%

== Trivia ==
In 1856, the rural bandit gang leader Sándor Rózsa (betyár Rózsa Sándor), who entered Hungarian national folklore, robbed the post office and national savings bank agency in Ürmenhausen. He escaped from the siege set by the gendarmes, but killed the local headborough/village judge, his very last victim.

== See also ==
- List of places in Serbia
- List of cities, towns and villages in Vojvodina

== Sources ==
- "Ürményháza-Jermenovci" multjának és jelenének rövid vázlata, A Tudás kiadás- Összehozta/irta Fehér Lajos, Ürményháza 1984.
- Milleker Bódog: Ürményháza története (1817–1906), Versec 1906.
- Borovszki Samu dr. : Torontál vármegye. Országos Monográfiai Társaság, Budapest.
- Ürményházi Attila a.k.a. Attila Urmenyhazi adatgyüjtõ/mûforditó, researcher/translator, Hobart (Tasmánia, Ausztrália) 2013.
- Slobodan Ćurčić, Broj stanovnika Vojvodine, Novi Sad, 1996.
