= Margita (Plandište) =

Margita Маргита
- Village (Selo)
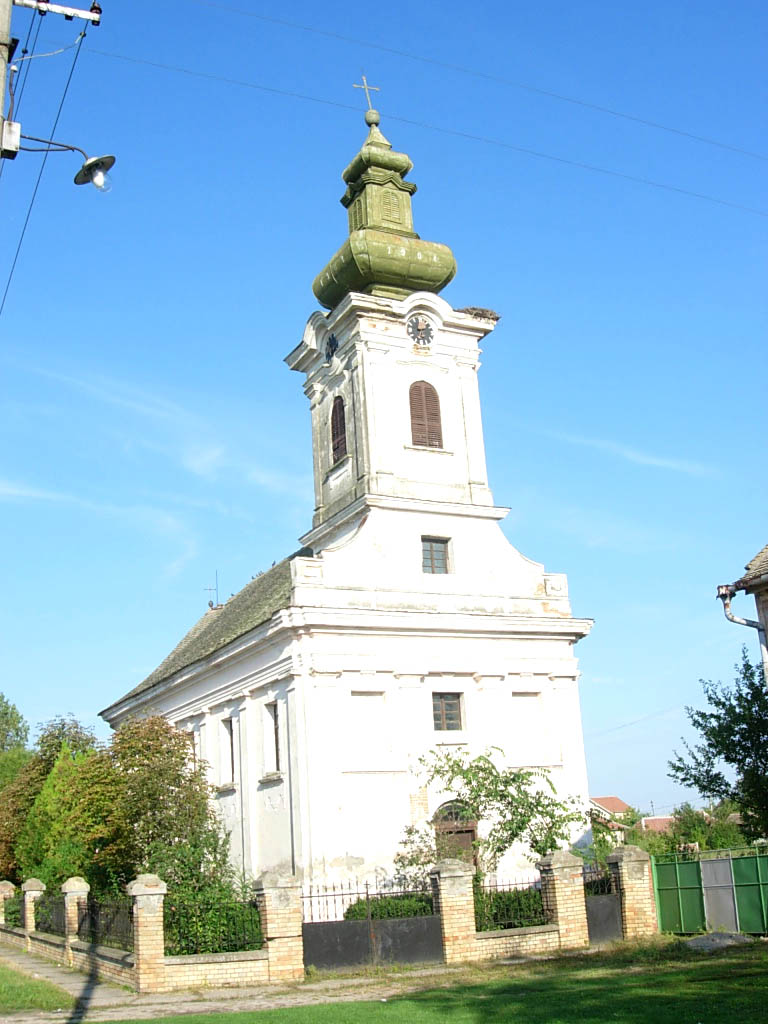
- The Orthodox Church

- Location of Margita within Serbia Margita (Serbia) Margita (Europe)
- Coordinates: 45°13′03″N 21°10′19″E
- Country: Serbia
- Province: Vojvodina
- District: South Banat
- Municipality: Plandište
- Elevation: 79 m (259 ft)

Population (2002)
  - Margita: 1,047
- Time zone: UTC+1 (CET)
  - Summer (DST): UTC+2 (CEST)
- Postal code: 26364
- Area code: +381(0)13
- Car plates: VŠ

Margita (Serbian Cyrillic: Маргита) is a village in Serbia. It is situated in the Plandište municipality, in the South Banat District, Vojvodina province. The population of the village numbering 1,047 people (2002 census). Village is ethnically mixed and its population include 462 Serbs (44,12%), 303 Romanians (28,93%), 107 Romani (10,21%), 100 Hungarians (9,55%), and others.

== Name ==
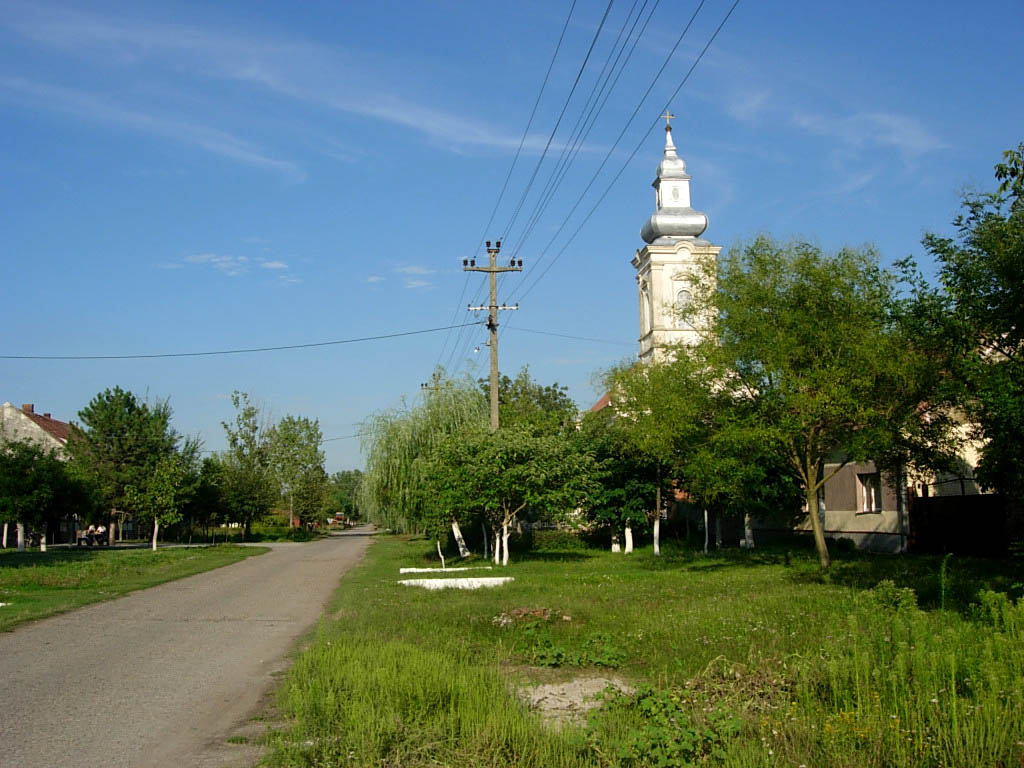
The Romanian Orthodox church.

In Serbian the village is known as Margita (Маргита), in Romanian as Mărghita, in Hungarian as Nagymargita, and in German as Groß Margit.

== Historical population ==
- 1961: 1,998
- 1971: 1,827
- 1981: 1,550
- 1991: 1,313
- 2002: 1,047

== See also ==
- List of places in Serbia
- List of cities, towns and villages in Vojvodina
