= Stari Lec =

Stari Lec Стари Лец
- Village (Selo)
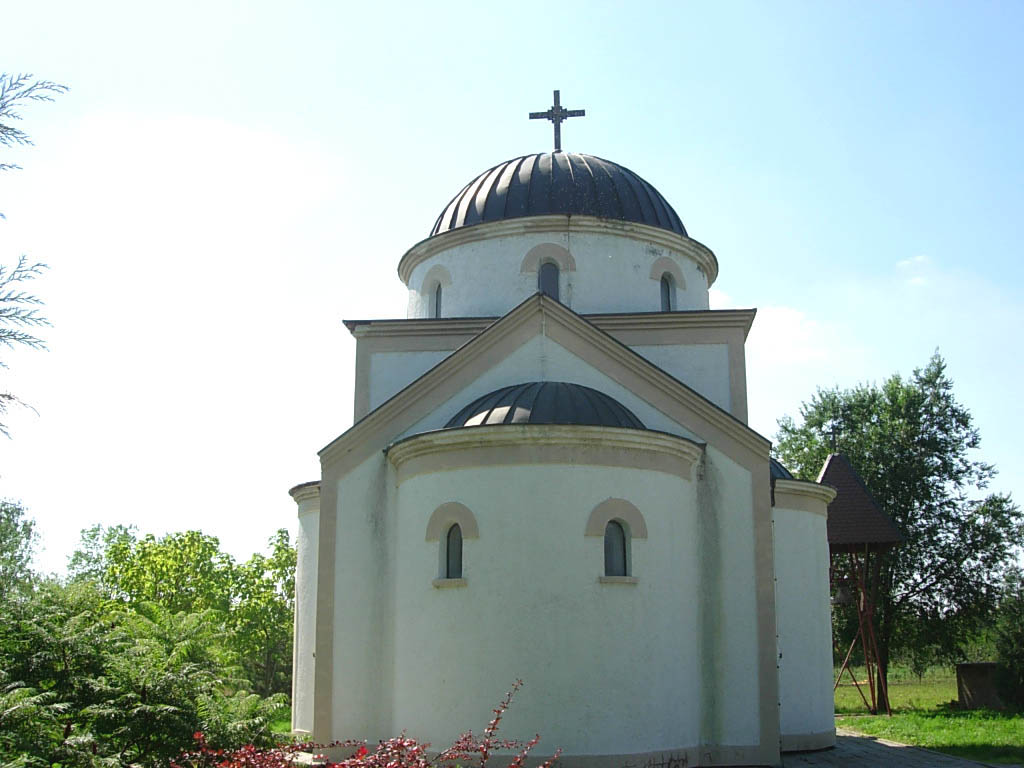
- The Orthodox Church

- Location of Stari Lec within Serbia Stari Lec (Serbia) Stari Lec (Europe)
- Coordinates: 45°17′01″N 20°57′28″E
- Country: Serbia
- Province: Vojvodina
- District: South Banat
- Municipality: Plandište
- Elevation: 47 m (154 ft)

Population (2002)
  - Stari Lec: 1,094
- Time zone: UTC+1 (CET)
  - Summer (DST): UTC+2 (CEST)
- Postal code: 26371
- Area code: +381(0)13
- Car plates: VŠ

Stari Lec (Serbian Cyrillic: Стари Лец) is a village in Serbia. It is situated in the Plandište municipality, in the South Banat District, Vojvodina province. One of Stari Lec's best known landmarks is Kapetanovo Castle.

== Name ==
In Serbian, the village is known as Stari Lec (Стари Лец), in German as Alt Letz, and in Hungarian as Óléc or Baráchháza.

== History ==
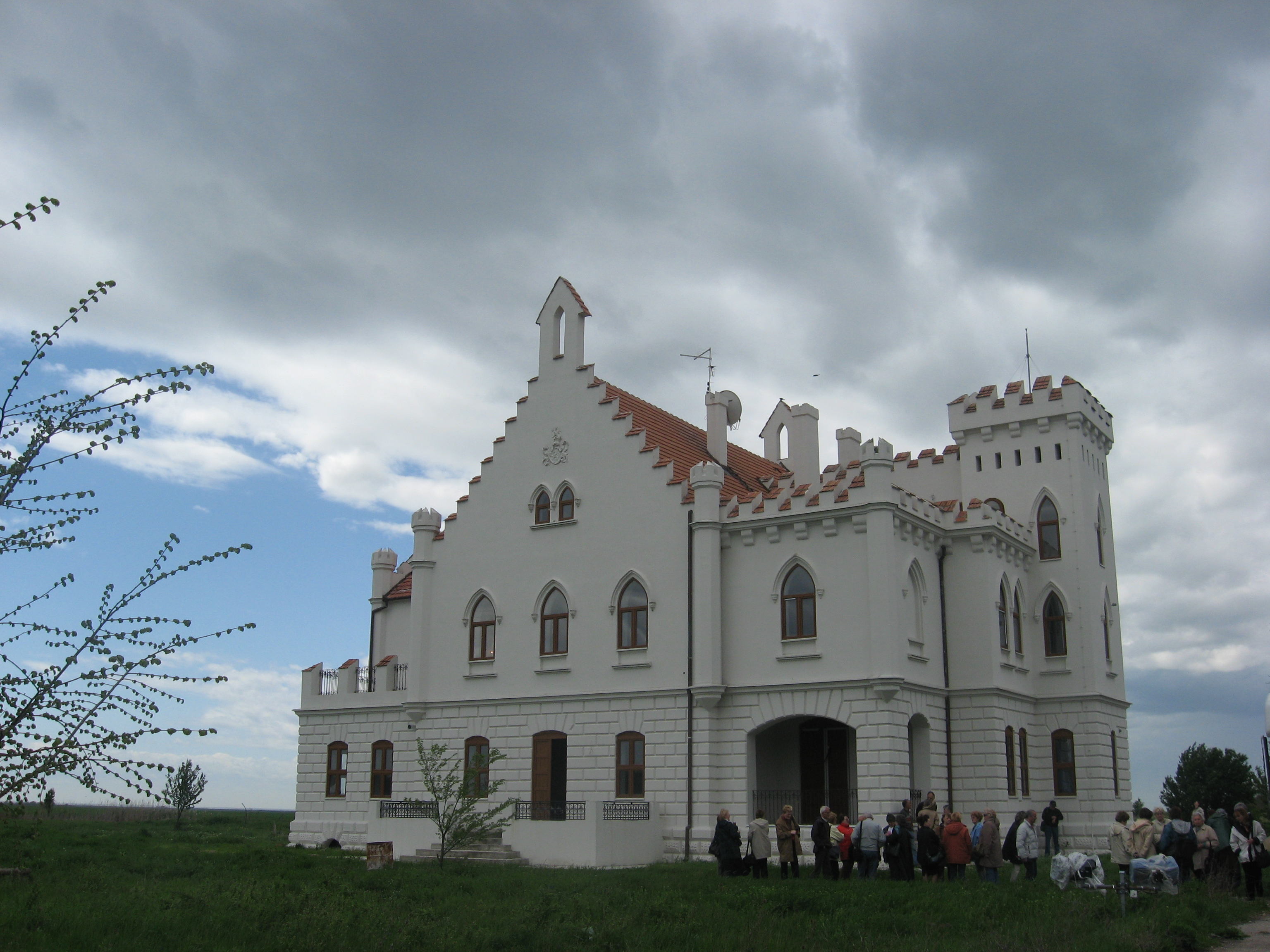
Kapetanovo Castle overview

Settlement was first mentioned in 1333. During Ottoman conquest in the 16th century, the settlement was destroyed, but it was later rebuilt since source dating from 1660/66 mention the village of Lec that was populated by Serbs. In 1838, the village was populated by Banat Bulgarians, and, in 1839 its population numbered 426 inhabitants. During the 19th century, Hungarians, Germans, and Slovaks settled in the village as well. After World War I, the new Serb settlers came to the village. In 1921, the population of the village numbered 1,011 inhabitants, including 426 Hungarians, 290 Germans, 138 Serbs, 29 Slovaks, and 97 other Slavs. After World War II, as a consequence of the war events, the German population fled from the village and it was then populated by new Serb and Macedonian settlers.

Stari Lec is location of Kapetanovo Castle, Monument of Culture of Great Importance.

== Ethnic groups (2002 census) ==
The village has a Serb ethnic majority with a present Hungarian minority and its population numbering 1,094 people (2002 census).

- Serbs = 791 (72.30%)
- Hungarians = 156 (14.26%)
- Macedonians = 20 (1.83%)
- Croats = 20 (1.83%)
- others.

== Historical population ==
- 1961: 1,406
- 1971: 1,236
- 1981: 1,341
- 1991: 1,031
- 2002: 1,094

== See also ==
- List of places in Serbia
- List of cities, towns and villages in Vojvodina
