= Kupinik, Plandište =

Kupinik Купиник
- Village (Selo)
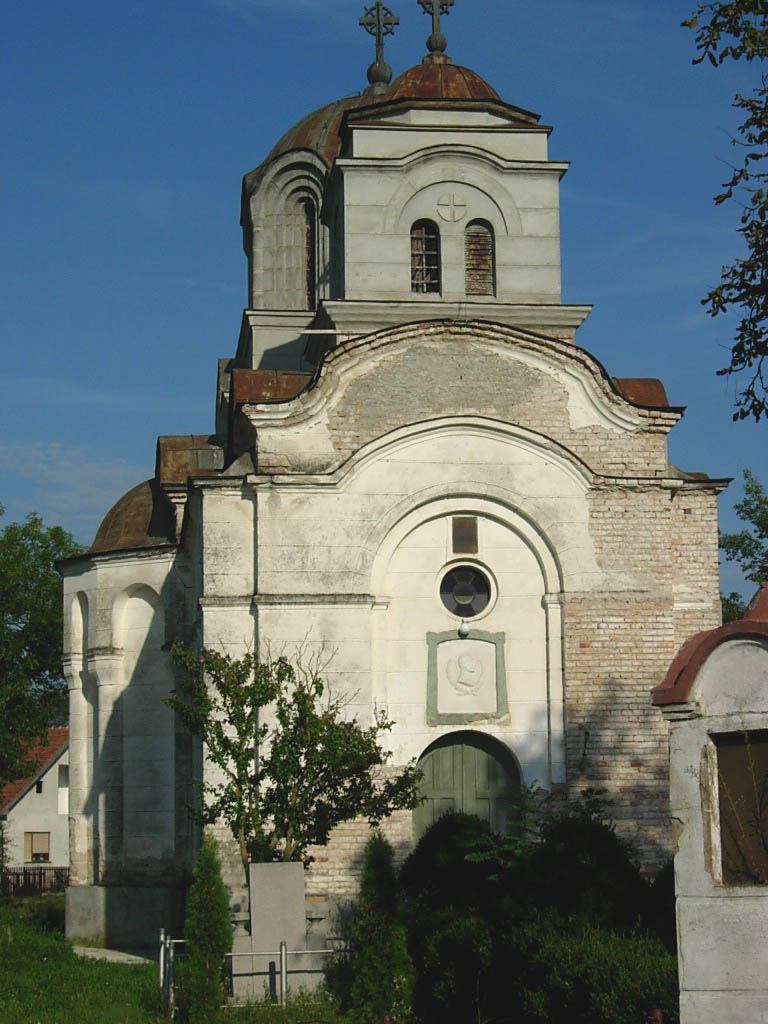
- The Orthodox Church

- Location of Kupinik within Serbia Kupinik (Serbia) Kupinik (Europe)
- Coordinates: 45°17′19″N 21°08′07″E
- Country: Serbia
- Province: Vojvodina
- District: South Banat
- Municipality: Plandište
- Elevation: 78 m (256 ft)

Population (2002)
  - Kupinik: 349
- Time zone: UTC+1 (CET)
  - Summer (DST): UTC+2 (CEST)
- Postal code: 26368
- Area code: +381(0)13
- Car plates: VŠ

Kupinik (Serbian Cyrillic: Купиник) is a village in Serbia. It is situated in the Plandište municipality, in the South Banat District, Vojvodina province. The village has a Serb ethnic majority (95,70%) and its population numbering 349 people (2002 census).

== Historical population ==
- 1961: 886
- 1971: 735
- 1981: 545
- 1991: 409
- 2002: 349

== See also ==
- List of places in Serbia
- List of cities, towns and villages in Vojvodina
