= Dužine =

Dužine Дужине
- Village (Selo)
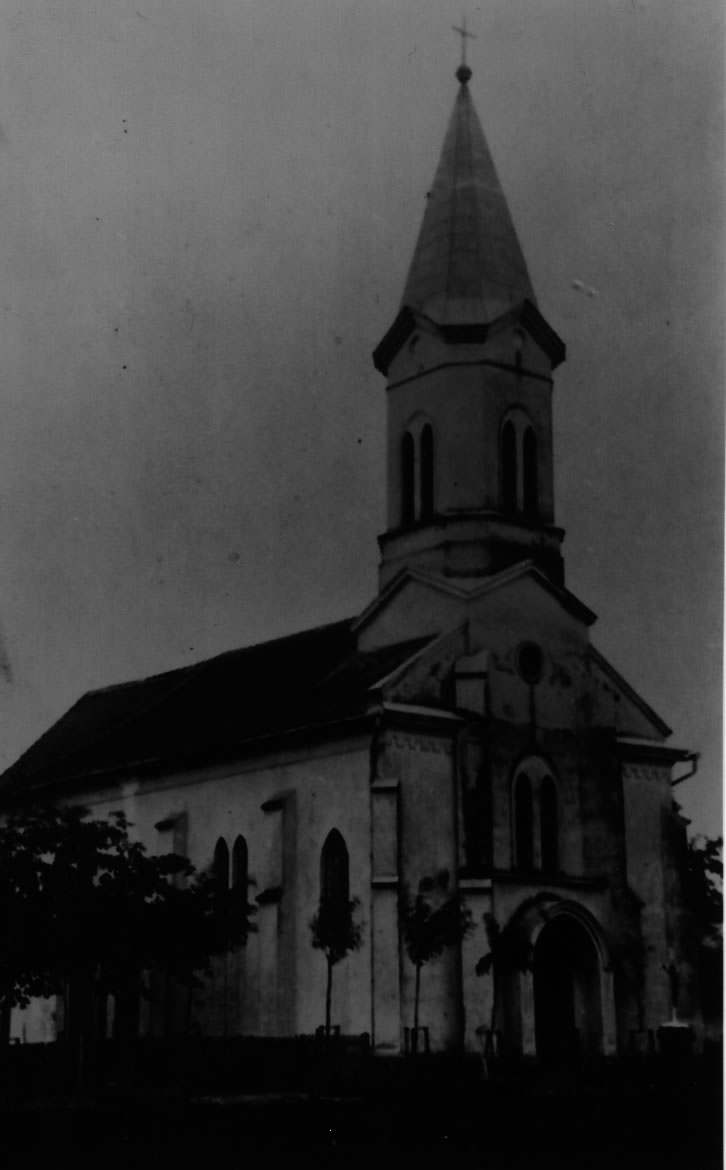
- Roman Catholic church in Dužine in 1934

- Location of Dužine within Serbia Dužine (Serbia) Dužine (Europe)
- Coordinates: 45°17′12″N 20°59′32″E
- Country: Serbia
- Province: Vojvodina
- District: South Banat
- Municipality: Plandište
- Elevation: 74 m (243 ft)

Population (2002)
  - Dužine: 219
- Time zone: UTC+1 (CET)
  - Summer (DST): UTC+2 (CEST)
- Area code: +381(0)13
- Car plates: VŠ

Dužine (Serbian Cyrillic: Дужине) is a village in Serbia. It is situated in the Plandište municipality, in the South Banat District, Vojvodina province. The village has a Serb ethnic majority (54,33%) with a present Macedonian (31,05%) and Slovenian (8,21%) minority. Its population numbering 219 people (2002 census). There is also an officially recognized Macedonian minority population living in Dužine.

== Name ==
In Serbian the village is known as Dužine / Дужине (formerly also Sečenovo / Сеченово), in Macedonian as Дужине, in Hungarian as Szécsenfalva, and in German as Setschanfeld.

== Historical population ==
- 1961: 623
- 1971: 400
- 1981: 282
- 1991: 234
- 2002: 219

== See also ==
- List of places in Serbia
- List of cities, towns and villages in Vojvodina
