= Plandište =

Plandište Пландиште (Serbian) Zichyfalva (Hungarian) Пландиште (Macedonian) Plandiște (Romanian)
- Village and municipality
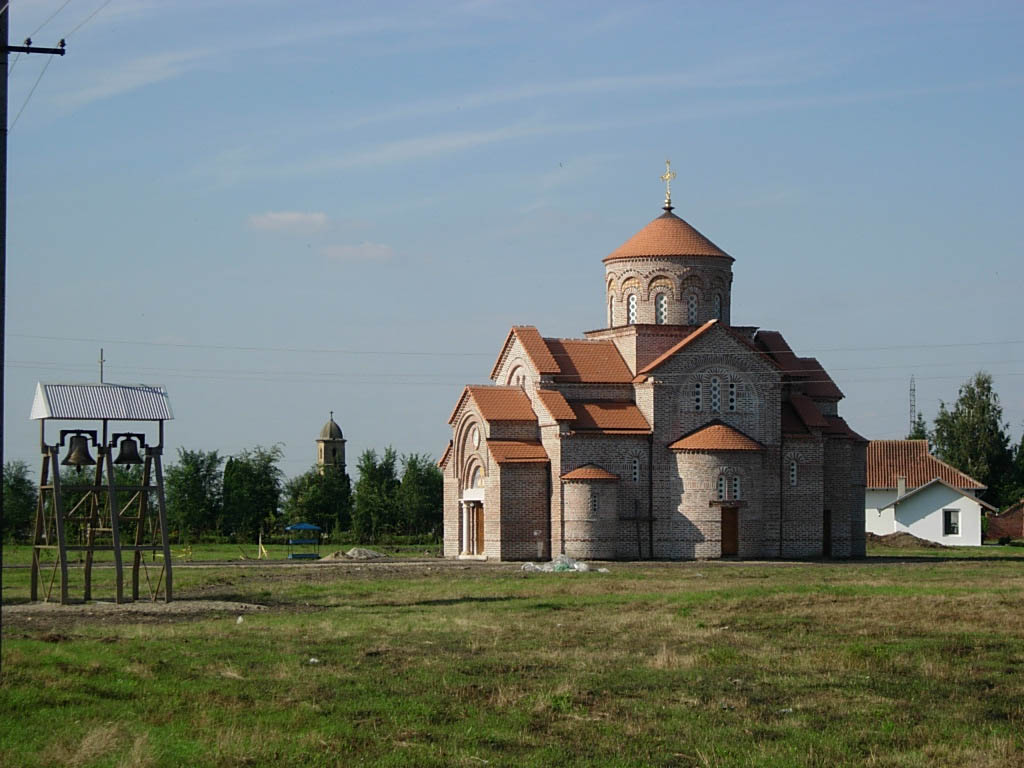
- The new Orthodox church

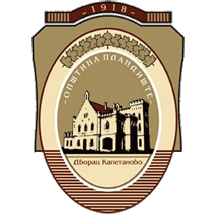
- Coat of arms

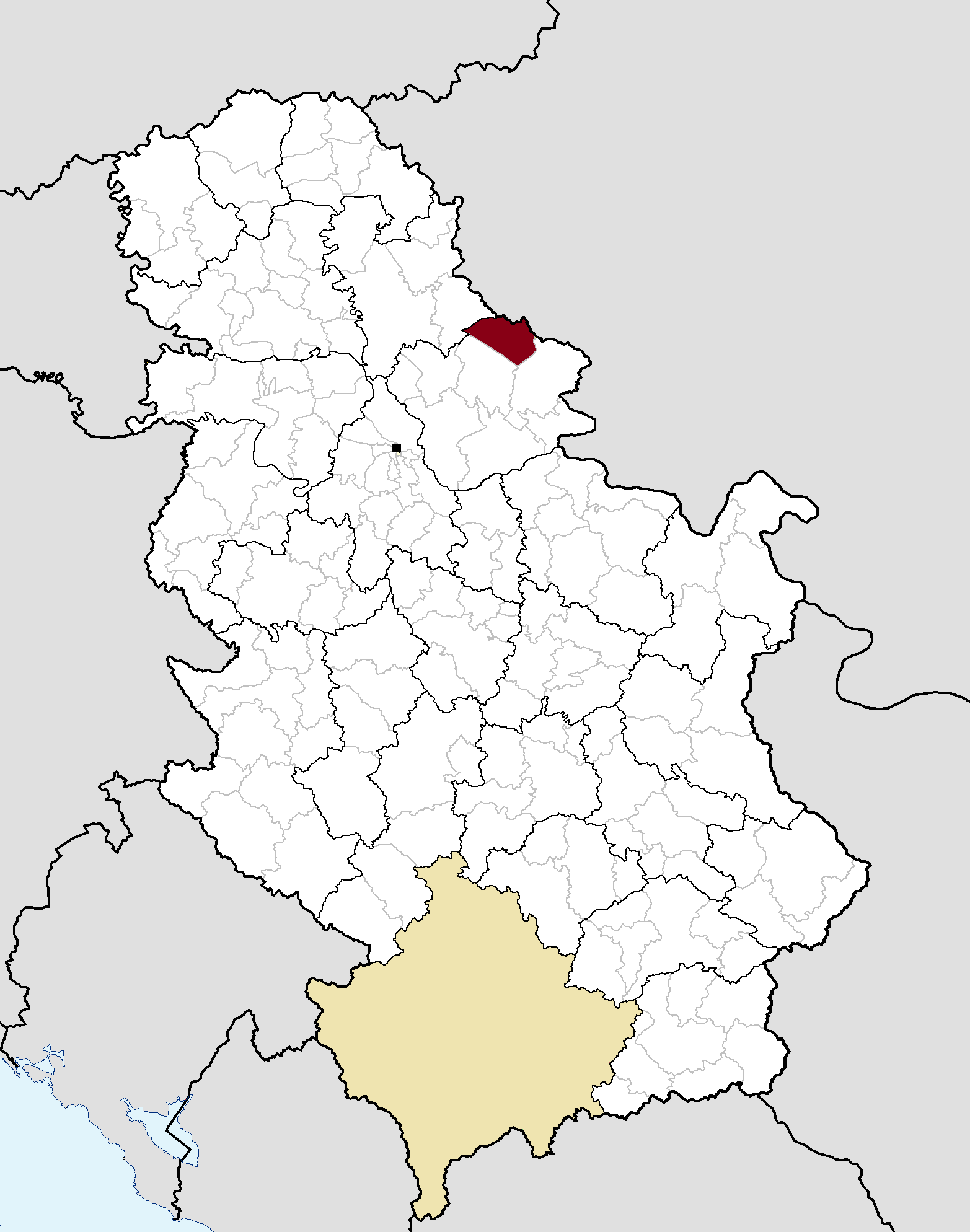
- Location of Plandište within Serbia
- Coordinates: 45°13′37″N 21°7′18″E
- Country: Serbia
- Province: Vojvodina
- District: South Banat

Government
  - Mayor: Jovan Repac (SNS)
- Elevation: 79 m (259 ft)

Population (2022)
  - Plandište: 3,329
  - Metro: 8,957
- Time zone: UTC+1 (CET)
  - Summer (DST): UTC+2 (CEST)
- Postal code: 26360
- Area code: +381(0)13
- Car plates: VŠ
- Official languages: Serbian together with Romanian, Hungarian and Macedonian
- Website: www.plandiste.com

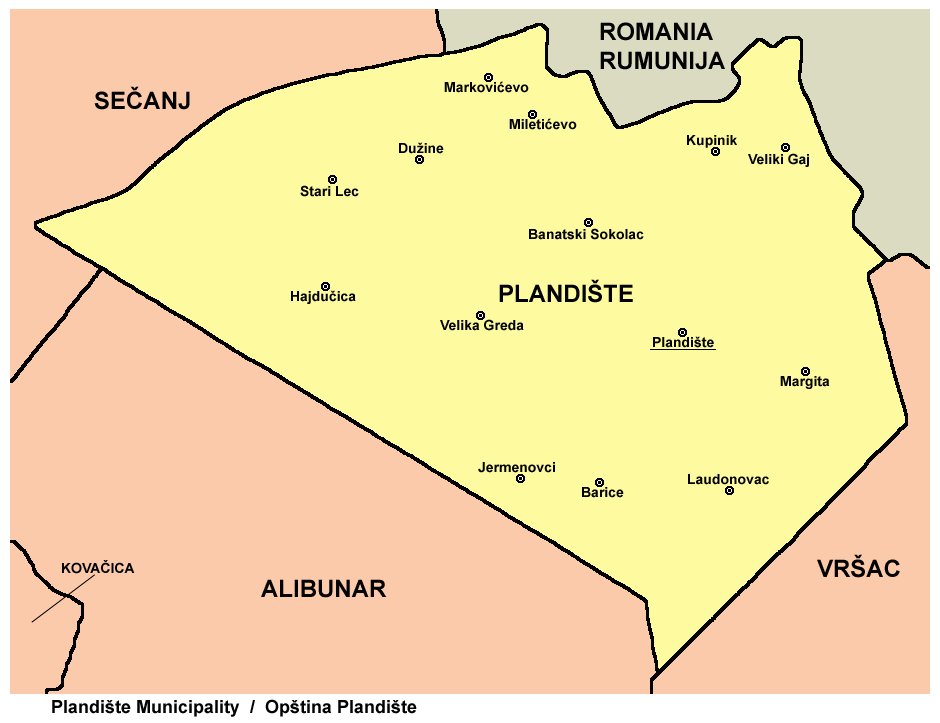
Map of Plandište municipality

Plandište (Serbian: Пландиште, pronounced [plândiːʃte]; Hungarian: Zichyfalva; German: Zichydorf) is a village and municipality located in the South Banat District of the autonomous province of Vojvodina, Serbia. The village has a population of 3,329, while Plandište municipality has 8,957 inhabitants (2022 census). One of municipality's best known landmarks is Kapetanovo Castle, located in Stari Lec.

== Name ==
In Serbian, the village is known as Пландиште or Plandište, in Romanian as Plandiște, in Hungarian as Zichyfalva, in German as Zichydorf pronounced [Zɪdʒidorf], and in Macedonian: Пландиште.

The name of the village derived from the word plandovati used in the local Serbian dialect, which in modern standard Serbian means odmarati, and in English means to rest.

== History ==
=== World Politics running over Banat for centuries ===
Banat as part of Pannonia was under Roman rule from 9 BC to the end of the fourth century. In the fifth century, the Huns razed the land. In the ninth century, the Hungarian empire started its reign, and around 1000 AD the Banat became part of the prospering Hungarian empire. In the thirteenth century Genghis Khan invaded Europe. After the Battle of Mohács in 1526, the Turks took over two-thirds of Hungary, including Banat.

=== Settlements before Zichydorf ===
In the municipal area of Plandište have been several places in medieval times: Bioseg, Terjan, Sarkac and Raros. These names still exist on 18th-century maps.

According to Milleker there were several different villages named Bioseg between 1375 and 1550. They were named O-Belzeg, Nagy-Belzeg und Pervan-Belzeg. The names mean:

- Prefix bel- or bio- comes from Serbian belu which means white (compare to Belgrade / Beograd).
- -zeg comes from Hungarian sziget meaning island.
- Pervan is Serbian and means first, which is common at that time and area to distinguish different places of the same name: simply give numbers.
- Milleker does not tell anything about O-. Maybe it is nothing more than a guess: in German it is common to abbreviate Ober with O- meaning the village located on higher altitude.
- Nagy is Hungarian and means big.

What happened to the villages during the reign of the Ottoman is unknown. When the Hungarians came back, of those villages only a few houses and the names were left.

Milleker talks about a legend, that at the today location of Plandište there had been a battle between Prince Eugene and the Ottoman Empire during the Great Turkish War (1683-1699) most likely around 1686 (TODO check). What remained was a graveyard, which was discovered in 1889 during the erection of the train line from Zrenjanin to Margita. He suggests that Romanian Shepherds founded Morminț which means cemetery in Romanian and thus might refer to exactly this battle and graveyard.

The fact is, in 1713 the village Morminț existed at the location of Plandište with a count of 23 houses. After the Austro-Turkish War (1716–1718), it counted only 8. In 1738 the Ottoman Turks struck back, destroying settlements along the Danube, including Morminț. The Turks advanced north over the next year, all the way to Temesvar, the capital of Banat. After this invasion, the territory around Morminț was abandoned.

=== Austrians driving back the Ottoman ===
The Austrians and Hungarians joined forces and in 1738 pushed the Turks back south, across the Danube. The expulsion of the Turks brought organized settlement under the auspices of the Habsburg dynasty. Austro-Hungarian military campaigns were based on German nobility - Counts, who served as generals to the Imperial Austrian Army. It was custom for the Austrian Kaiser to reward each count with a piece of land from the newly conquered Banat. So Count Carl Zichy de Vásonkeö, at that time (check time!) president of the Hofkammer), became the owner of about 10,000 acres (check, usually they counted in Austrian Katastraljoch which is 0.57 ha) of land in the Plandište area. Since he did not earn much money from the lease of this land he decided to take part in the colonization effort.

=== Colonizing the Conquered Land ===
In 1782 Emperor Joseph II started the third colonization into Banat which ended in 1787. Later, in winter 1787 and spring 1788 the colony Zichydorf was established. So they settled it with people from German Banat villages instead: Grabaț, Jimbolia (Hatzfeld), Comloșu Mic (Ostern), Iecea Mică (Klein-Jetscha) and Iecea Mare (Groß-Jetscha). The new settlement consisted of 123 houses owning 34 Katastraljoch (19.5 ha) each.

In 1867 Austria adopted a dual monarchy known as the Austro-Hungarian Empire. The Hungarian authorities later forced Magyarization to create a special Hungarian nation from a mixed population, which was mostly German, but also included Hungarians, Romanians, Serbs, Turks and several other ethnics. Magyarization resulted in the name change from German to Hungarian. So Zichydorf was renamed to Zichyfalva or Zichyhaza. Also, the Hungarians built a lot of infrastructure like railroads and the Danube–Tisa–Danube Canal.

=== Zichydorf in the 1860s ===
According to a report by Johan Gruczar, in the 1860s Zichydorf had a school with two classrooms, a town hall, a hospital which could serve "fifteen patients annually". The report states that the area could experience drastic changes in temperature during the summer, heavy rains that led to flooding which damaged crops and major storms due to the wind patterns.

It was reported that in 1849 migratory locusts arrived in the area and those that landed were beaten with branches broken off of bushes while the locusts that didn't land were driven off by drummers in the field.

Zichydorf was a market town and outside buyers would come into town during the weekly market to buy butter and eggs that were then resold in Werchetz and Temesvár. Various kinds of fowl were bought and sold by the local inhabitants and potatoes were brought to market from Morizfeld, Kudritz and other nearby settlements.

There were also annual markets where Zichydorfers could buy boots, shoes, linens, shovels, and dry goods.

According to the report Zichydorf was primarily Roman Catholic with 2422 Roman Catholics, 14 Greek Orthodox, 14 Jewish and 3 Lutheran. By nationality there were 2439 German and 14 Serbian/Romanian.

Food wise it was reported that the inhabitants baked good bread, ate beef broth soup with bread dipped in vinegar on weekdays and they used beef and chicken in paprikasch. Pork was the main meat product and on during festivals they would eat beef in beef broth with horse radish. Other festival meals were beef tenderloin with a sour sauce, cabbage with cucumbers, peppers and celery, prunes, turnips, baked and sugared Händel, rice cooked in milk and cinnamon, wine soup, breaded yeast based pastas

The usual drinks were brandy, water, wine and beer.

=== Modern times ===
After the Treaty of Versailles in 1918 the new borders brought Zichyfalva into the state of Serbia, which became part of the newly formed Kingdom of Yugoslavia. Alexander I of Yugoslavia proclaimed the change of all place names to Serbian and so it was named Mariolana.

During the German occupation in the Second World War the names of the settlements were returned to the German original names. Afterwards the place got its present name Plandište. The German population was expelled under harsh conditions, many being send to Russian work camps and Serbian concentration camps. Immigrants from other parts of the country arrived on the territory of the municipality, so that 18 ethnicities were represented in the again multi-ethnic population structure.

== Inhabited places ==
Plandište municipality includes the following villages:

- Plandište
- Banatski Sokolac
- Barice
- Velika Greda
- Veliki Gaj
- Dužine
- Jermenovci
- Kupinik
- Laudonovac
- Margita
- Markovićevo
- Miletićevo
- Stari Lec
- Hajdučica

== Demographics ==
Historical population of the village:

Historical population

Year	Pop.	±%
1869	2,937	—
1880	2,636	−10.2%
1890	3,128	+18.7%
1900	3,192	+2.0%
1910	2,846	−10.8%
1921	3,120	+9.6%

Year	Pop.	±%
1931	3,281	+5.2%
1948	3,040	−7.3%
1953	3,096	+1.8%
1961	3,509	+13.3%
1971	3,769	+7.4%
1981	4,122	+9.4%

=== Ethnic groups ===
Municipality

According to the 2011 census, the municipality of Plandište had a total population of 11,336, including:

- 5,868 Serbs (51.76%)
- 1,280 Hungarians (11.29%)
- 1,042 Macedonians (9.19%)
- 784 Romanians (7.92%)
- 616 Slovaks (5.43%)
- 281 Romani (2.48%)
- 1,465 Others and undeclared (12.92%)

Settlements with Serb ethnic majority are: Plandište, Banatski Sokolac, Velika Greda, Veliki Gaj, Dužine, Kupinik, Laudonovac, Markovićevo, Miletićevo, and Stari Lec. The settlement with Romanian ethnic majority is Barice. The settlement with Hungarian ethnic majority is Jermenovci. Ethnically mixed settlement with relative Serb majority is Margita. Ethnically mixed settlement with relative Slovak majority is Hajdučica.

Village

Year	Total	Serbs	Macedonians	Yugoslavs	Hungarians	Romanians	Slovaks	Montenegrins	Unknown
1991	4,380	54.84%	23.69%	9.2%	5.57%	1.57%	0.82%	0.66%	3.65%
2002	4,270	59.46%	21.31%	3.93%	5.69%	1.7%	0.96%	0.42%	6.53%

== See also ==
- List of places in Serbia
- List of cities, towns and villages in Vojvodina
- Municipalities of Serbia
- South Banat District
- Geschichte der Gemeinde Zichydorf by Johann Achtzehner

== Twin towns ==
- 13th district of Budapest, Hungary, since 2024

== Gallery ==
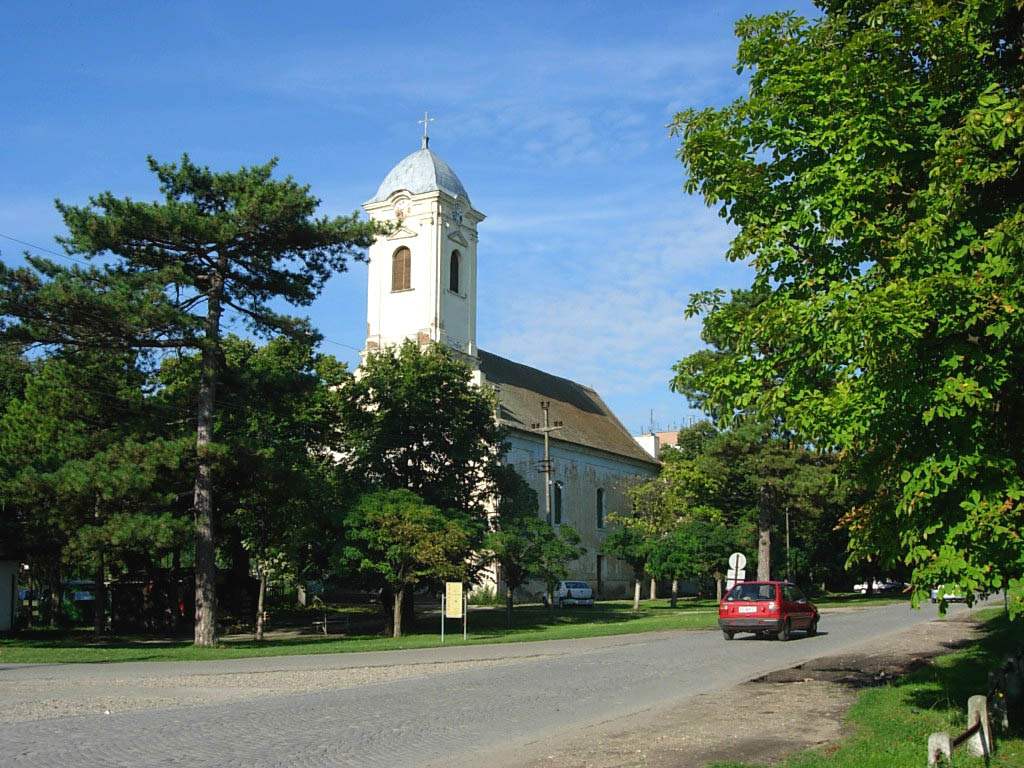
The center of the village and the old Catholic Church

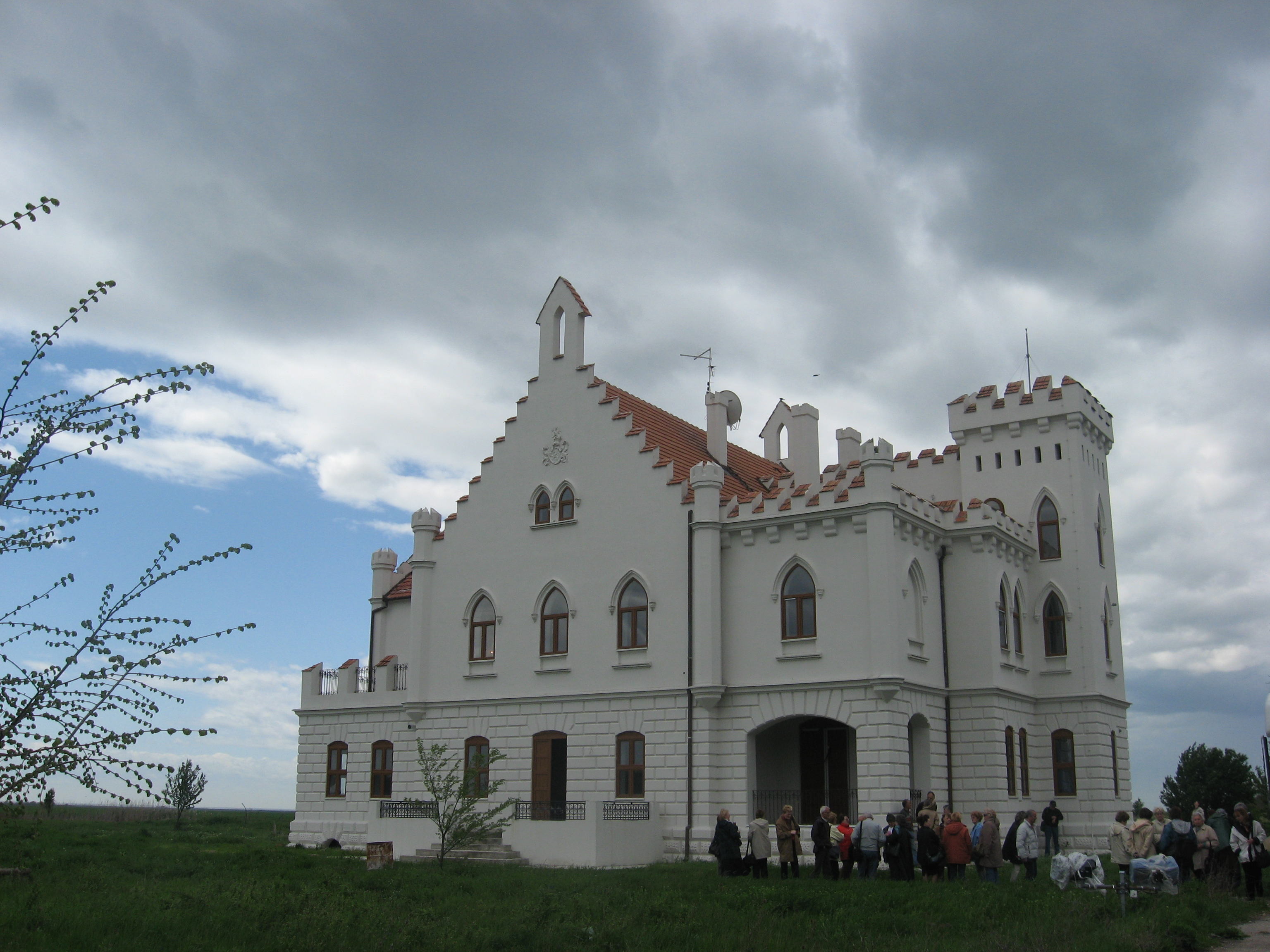
Kapetanovo Castle in Stari Lec

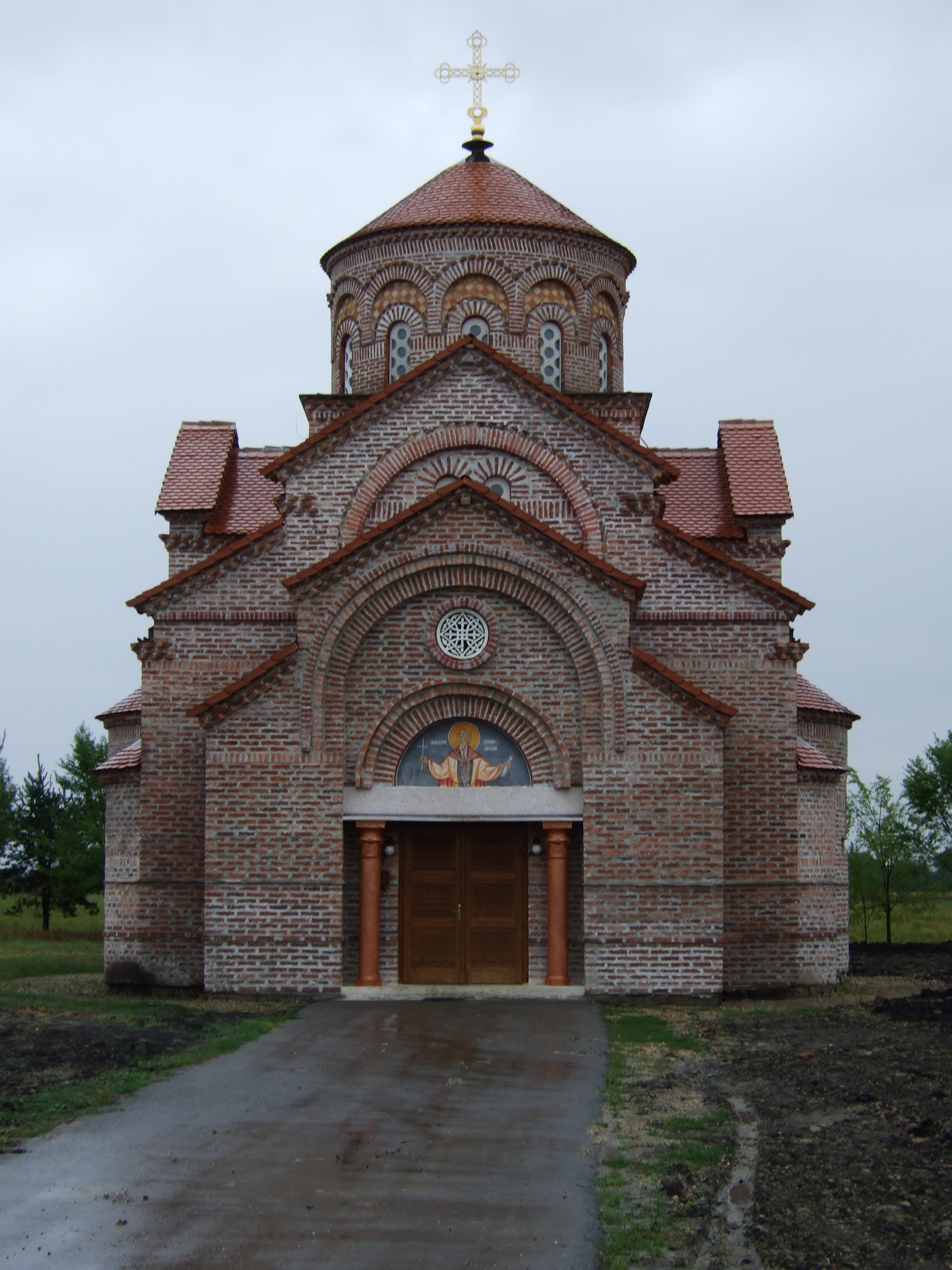
New orthodox church

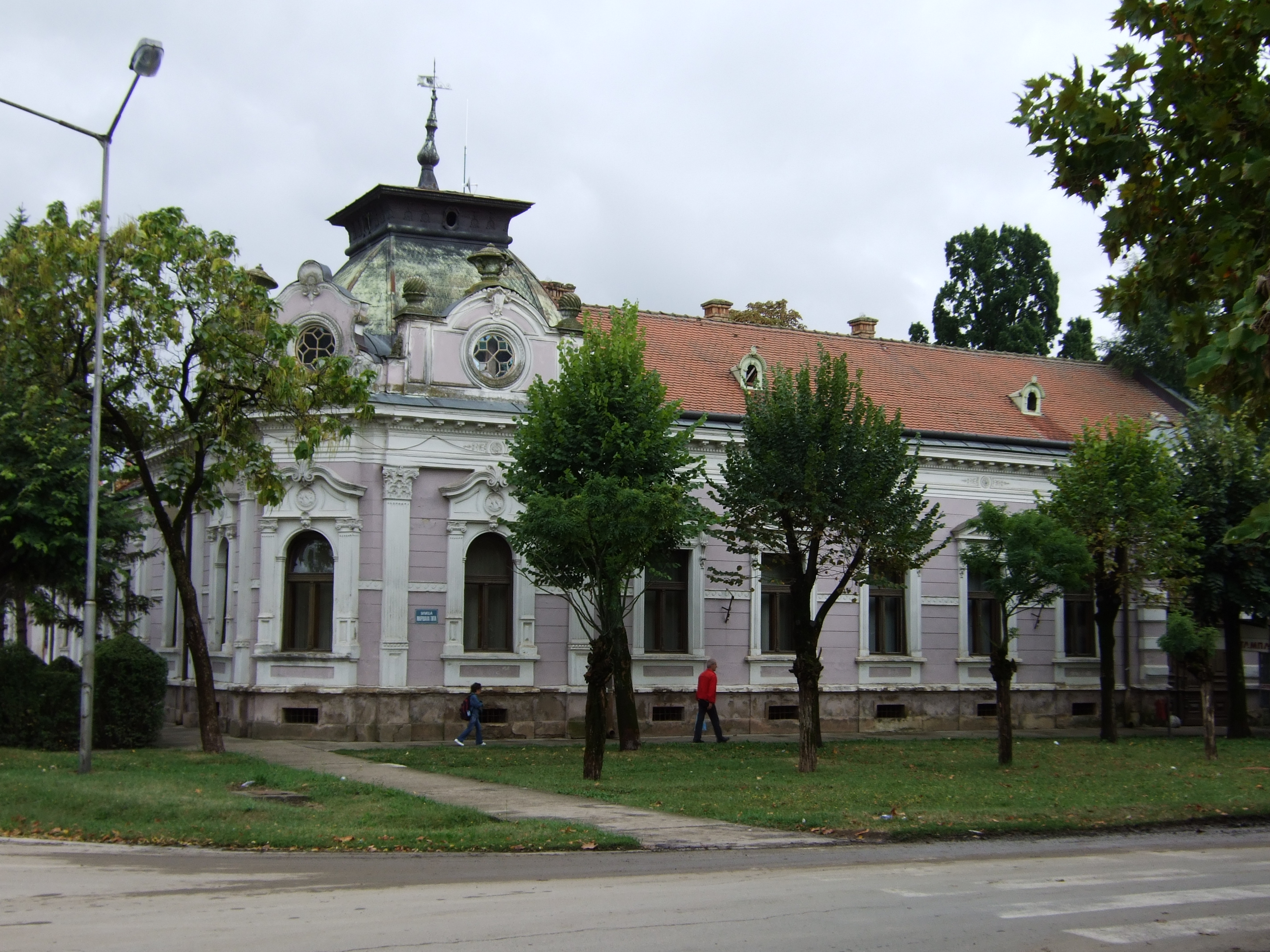
House Wosching built about 1890
