= Velika Greda =

Velika Greda Велика Греда
- Village (Selo)
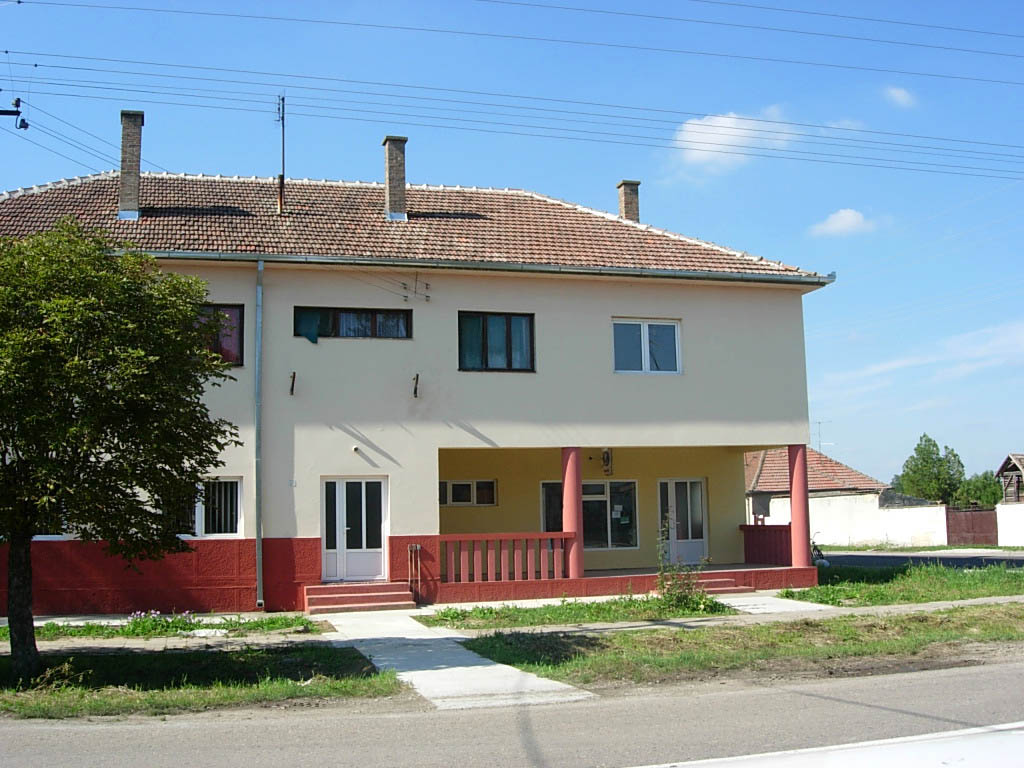
- The health center in the village

- Location of Velika Greda within Serbia Velika Greda (Serbia) Velika Greda (Europe)
- Coordinates: 45°14′22″N 21°01′27″E
- Country: Serbia
- Province: Vojvodina
- District: South Banat
- Municipality: Plandište
- Elevation: 74 m (243 ft)

Population (2002)
  - Velika Greda: 1,374
- Time zone: UTC+1 (CET)
  - Summer (DST): UTC+2 (CEST)
- Postal code: 26366
- Area code: +381(0)13
- Car plates: VŠ

Velika Greda (Serbian Cyrillic: Велика Греда) is a village in Serbia. It is situated in the Plandište municipality, in the South Banat District, Vojvodina province. The village has a Serb ethnic majority (69,86%) with a present Hungarian (12.29%) and a Macedonian minority (9.89%), and its population as of the 2002 census, was 1,374 people.

== Name ==
In Serbian, the village is known as Velika Greda (Велика Греда), in Hungarian as Györgyháza, and in German as Georgshausen.

== Historical population ==
- 1961: 1,942
- 1971: 1,775
- 1981: 1,585
- 1991: 1,508
- 2002: 1,374

== See also ==
- List of places in Serbia
- List of cities, towns and villages in Vojvodina
