= List of football clubs in Serbia =

This is a list of football clubs located in Serbia and the leagues and divisions they play in 2011–12 season, as well as some other notable football clubs that play in the Serbian football league system.

== Super League (Top tier) ==
- 2023/24 season

Club	City	Stadium	Capacity
Čukarički	Belgrade	Čukarički Stadium	4,070
IMT	Belgrade	Shopping Center Stadium	5,175
Javor	Ivanjica	Javor Stadium	3,000
Mladost	Lučani	Mladost Stadium	8,000
Napredak	Kruševac	Mladost Stadium	10,330
Novi Pazar	Novi Pazar	Novi Pazar City Stadium	12,000
Partizan	Belgrade	Partizan Stadium	29,775
Radnički 1923	Kragujevac	Čika Dača Stadium	15,100
Radnički	Niš	Čair Stadium	18,151
Radnik	Surdulica	Surdulica City Stadium	3,312
Red Star	Belgrade	Rajko Mitić Stadium	53,000
Spartak	Subotica	Subotica City Stadium	13,000
TSC	Bačka Topola	TSC Arena	4,500
Vojvodina	Novi Sad	Karađorđe Stadium	14,458
Voždovac	Belgrade	Shopping Center Stadium	5,175
Železničar	Pančevo	SC Mladost Stadium	2,300

== First League (Second tier) ==
- 2023/24 season

Team	City	Stadium	Capacity
Dubočica	Leskovac	Dubočica Stadium	8,136
RFK Grafičar	Belgrade	Stadion Rajko Mitić - Jug veštačka trava	1,000
Inđija	Inđija	Toyo Tires Arena	4,500
Jedinstvo	Ub	Stadion "Dragan Džajić"	4,000
Kolubara	Lazarevac	Kolubara Stadium	2,500
Mačva	Šabac	Stadion FK Mačva Šabac	5,494
Metalac	Gornji Milanovac	Stadion Metalac	4,400
Mladost	Novi Sad	GAT Arena	14,458
Novi Sad 1921	Čelarevo	Stadion "ČSK Čelarevo"	6,000
OFK Beograd	Belgrade	Omladinski Stadium	19,100
OFK Vršac	Vršac	Gradski stadion Vršac	5,000
Radnički	New Belgrade	Stadion FK Radnički (NBG)	5,000
Radnički	Sremska Mitrovica	Gradski stadion	2,000
Sloboda	Užice	Radomir Antić Stadium	12,000
Smederevo 1924	Smederevo	Smederevo Stadium	17,200
Tekstilac	Odžaci	Gradski stadion Odžaci	3,000

== Serbian League (Third tier) ==
=== Belgrade ===
- OFK Srenjinak
- FK BASK
- FK Karaklije Tara
- FK GSP Polet Dorćol
- GFK Sloboda Uzice
- FK Kovačevac
- FK PKB Padinska Skela
- FK Radnički Mitrovac
- FK Osmanovic Beograd
- FK Slavija Nis
- FK Sopotar
- FK Srem Dunav
- FK Šumadija Jagnjilo
- FK Jeloravac
- FK Nas Zavicaj
- FK Sevojno

=== Vojvodina ===
- FK Mladost Apatin
- FK ČSK Čelarevo
- OFK Kikinda
- FK Mladost Bački Jarak
- FK Palić
- FK Radnički Nova Pazova
- FK Senta
- FK Sloga Temerin
- FK Cement Beočin
- FK Vršac
- FK Donji Srem
- FK Veternik
- FK Dolina Padina
- FK Sloboda Novi Kozarci
- FK Solunac Rastina

=== West ===
- FK Budućnost Valjevo
- FK FAP
- FK INON
- FK Jedinstvo Ub
- FK Loznica
- FK Mačva Šabac
- FK Metalac Kraljevo
- FK Radnički Klupci
- FK Sloboda Čačak
- FK Sloboda Užice
- FK Sloga Kraljevo
- FK Sloga Požega
- FK Sloga Petrovac na Mlavi
- FK Vujić Valjevo
- FK Železničar Lajkovac

=== East ===
- FK Balkanski
- FK Car Konstantin
- FK Dubočica
- FK Hajduk Veljko
- FK Jedinstvo Bošnjace
- FK Jedinstvo Paraćin
- FK Kopaonik Brus
- FK Radnički Pirot
- FK Radnički Svilajnac
- FK Rudar Aleksinački Rudnik
- FK Svrljig
- FK Timok
- FK Vlasina
- FK Župa Aleksandrovac

== Zone League (Fourth tier) ==
=== Belgrade ===
- FK PKB Padinska Skela
- FK Zvezdara
- FK Borac Ostružnica
- FK Budućnost Dobanovci
- FK Crvena zvezda Mali Mokri Lug
- FK GSP Polet
- FK Lasta Sremčica
- FK Lokomotiva Beograd
- FK Milutinac Zemun
- FK Posovac
- FK Poštar Beograd
- FK Slavija Beograd
- FK Trudbenik
- FK Turbina Vreoci
- FK Vinča
- FK Radnički Rudovci
- FK Železničar Beograd

=== Vojvodina East ===
- FK Bačka 1901
- FK Budućnost Srpska Crnja
- FK Dinamo Pančevo
- FK Jedinstvo Novi Bečej
- FK Kozara Banatsko Veliko Selo
- FK Obilić Novi Kneževac
- FK Radnički Bajmok
- FK Radnički Zrenjanin
- FK Spartak Debeljača
- FK Vojvodina Novo Miloševo
- FK AFK Ada
- FK Zadrugar Lazarevo
- FK Borac Starčevo
- FK Proleter Banatski Karlovac

=== Vojvodina West ===
- OFK Bačka
- FK 1. Maj Ruma
- FK Borac Novi Sad
- FK Budućnost Mladenovo
- FK Crvenka
- FK Crvena Zvezda Novi Sad
- FK Jedinstvo Stara Pazova
- FK Jugović Kać
- FK Mladost Turija
- FK Polet Karavukovo
- FK Radnički Irig
- FK Radnički Sremska Mitrovica
- FK Metalac Futog
- FK Dunav Stari Banovci
- FK Indeks Novi Sad
- FK Obilić Zmajevo
- FK Sloga Erdevik

=== Pomoravlje-Timok ===
- FK Bor
- FK Borac Bivolje
- SFS Borac
- FK Dunav Prahovo
- FK Đerdap
- FK Kablovi Zaječar
- FK Morava Ćuprija
- FK Ozren Sokobanja
- FK Pepeljevac
- FK Slatina Bor
- FK Prva Petoletka Trstenik
- FK Putevi Zaječar
- FK Radnički Svilajnac
- FK Rudar Bor
- FK Sloga Ćićevac
- FK Temnić
- FK Trayal Kruševac
- FK Trgovački Jagodina

=== Niš ===
- FK BSK Bujanovac
- FK Bobište
- FK Jastrebac Blace
- FK Mladost Bosilegrad
- FK Mladost Lalinac
- FK Mladost Medoševac
- FK Morava Vladičin Han
- FK Napredak Aleksinac
- OFK Niš
- FK Pukovac
- FK Pusta Reka
- FK Radan Lebane
- FK Sloga Leskovac
- FK Topličanin
- FK Vučje
- FK Zaplanjac
- FK Žitorađa
- FK Zloćudovo

=== Dunav ===
- FK Beloševac
- FK Crvena zvezda Suvodol
- FK Homoljac Žagubica
- FK Jadar Gornji Dobrić
- FK Jadar Stupnica
- FK Krušik 04
- FK Morava Velika Plana
- FK Obilić Živica
- FK Omladinac Šetonje
- FK Radnički Valjevo
- FK Radnički Koceljeva
- FK Ribnica Mionica
- FK Rudar Kostolac
- FK Selevac
- FK Sloga Lipnički Šor
- FK VGSK Veliko Gradište
- FK Vrbovac
- FK Zvižd Kučevo

=== Morava ===
- FK Bane
- FK Crnokosa
- FK Erdoglija Kragujevac
- FK Gruža
- FK Mokra Gora
- FK Omladinac Novo Selo
- FK Orlovac
- FK Partizan Kosovska Mitrovica
- FK Pobeda Kragujevac
- FK Polet Ljubić
- FK Prijevor
- FK Sloga Bajina Bašta
- FK Sloga Sjenica
- FK Jošanica
- FK Šumadija Aranđelovac
- FK Takovo
- FK Vodojaža Grošnica

=== Drina ===
- FK Bajina Bašta
- FK FAP
- FK Luk
- FK Jedinstvo Vladimirci
- FK Jedinstvo Užice
- FK Jadar Stupnica
- FK Krušik
- OFK Osečina
- FK Polimlje
- FK Radnički Koceljeva
- FK Radnički Valjevo
- FK Radnički Zorka
- FK Sloga Lipnički Šor
- FK Sloga Sjenica
- FK Zlatar
- FK Zorka

== District League (Fifth tier) ==
=== Belgrade First League ===
- FK Železnik
- FK Lepušnica
- FK Baćevac
- FK Zmaj Zemun
- FK Dunavac Grocka
- FK Poštar
- FK Komgrap
- FK Rakovica
- FK Policajac
- FK Rudar Beograd
- FK PKB Kovilovo
- FK PIK Zemun
- FK Borac Lazarevac
- FK Strelac Mislođin
- FK Prva Iskra Barič
- FK BSK Batajnica
- FK Podunavac
- FK Obilić

=== PFL Sombor ===
- FK Mladost Kurščić
- FK Hajduk Stapar
- FK PIK Prigrevica
- FK Zadrugar
- FK Kordun
- FK Omladinac Bukovac
- FK Graničar
- FK Crvenka
- FK ŽAK Sombor
- FK Borac Bački Gradac
- FK BSK Bački Brestovac
- FK Kula
- FK Radnički Ratkovo
- OFK Odžaci

=== PFL Novi Sad ===
- FK Mladost Bački Petrovac
- FK Kabel
- FK Hercegovac Gajdobra
- FK Omladinac Stepanovićevo
- FK Borac Šajkaš
- FK Petrovaradin
- OFK Slavija Novi Sad
- FK Vrbas
- FK Stari Grad
- FK Jedinstvo Rumenka
- FK Srbobran
- FK Šajkaš
- FK ŽSK Žabalj
- FK Tvrdjava Bač
- FK Železničar Novi Sad
- FK Bečej
- FK Buducnost Mladenovo

=== PFL Sremska Mitrovica ===
- FK Jedinstvo Stara Pazova
- FK Podrinje Mačvanska Mitrovica
- GFK Sloven Ruma
- FK Graničar Adaševci
- FK Partizan Vitojevci
- FK Mladost Kupinovo
- FK Jadran Golubinci
- FK Sloga Milšped
- FK Hajduk Beška
- FK LSK Laćarak
- FK Zeka Buljubaša
- FK Hajduk Šimanovci
- FK Hajduk Višnjičevo
- FK Ljukovo
- FK Železničar Inđija
- FK Fruškogorac

== Others ==
=== 0-9 ===
- FK 14. Oktobar

=== A ===
- FK Aluminijum Niš
- FK Arsenal Kragujevac

=== B ===
- FK BAK Bela Crkva
- Backovac United
- FK Begej Žitište
- FK Bežbednost Valjevo
- FK Bilećanin Sečanj
- FK BIP Čačak
- FK Borac Martinci
- FK Borac Žabari
- FK Borac Stejanovci
- FK Bosilegrad
- FK BPI Pekar
- FK Bratstvo Krnjača
- FK Brestovac
- FK Brodoremont Kladovo
- FK Budućnost Alibunar
- FK Budućnost Arilje
- FK Budućnost Mladenovo
- FK Budućnost Prva Kutina
- FK Bukovik Ražanj
- FK Brzi Brod

=== C ===
- FK Crni Vrh Miljević
- FK Crvena zvezda V.S.

=== D ===
- FK Dragačevo
- FK Drina Ljubovija
- FK Dinamo Budisava

=== E ===
- FK Elan

=== G ===
- FK Goč Vrnjačka Banja
- FK Graničar Jamena

=== H ===
Hajduk Kula 1912

=== I ===
- FK Iskra Kucura 1912

=== J ===
- FK Jablanica Gornji Milanovac
- FK Jablanica Medveđa
- FK Jadran Golubinci
- FK Jadar Draginac
- GFK Jasenica 1911
- FK Jastrebac Niš
- FK Jedinstvo Bela Palanka
- FK Jedinstvo Donja Mutnica
- FK Jedinstvo Platičevo
- FK Jedinstvo Mali Zvornik
- FK Jedinstvo Ruma
- FK Jedinstvo Surčin
- FK Jedinstvo Vladimirci
- FK Jugović Kać

=== K ===
- FK Karađorđe Topola
- FK Krivelj
- FK Kordun Kljajićevo

=== L ===
- FK Lemind Leskovac
- FK Lešnica
- FK Lužnica Babušnica
- FK Lunjevica Gornji Milanovac
- FK Lipar
- FK Lisović
- FK Ljukovo
- FK Lehel

=== M ===
- RFK Majdanpek
- FK Marjan Knićanin Knić
- FK Mićunovo
- FK Milicionar Bogatić
- FK Miločajac Miločaj
- FK Mladi Obilić
- FK Mladost Omoljica
- FK Morava Ribare
- FK Mladost Prnjavor

=== N ===
- FK Naša krila Belotinac
- FK Novi Beograd

=== O ===
- FK Omladinac Malošište
- FK Omladinac Novi Banovci
- FK Omladinac Slepčević

=== P ===
- FK Panonija
- FK Pančevo
- FK Partizan Kaluđerica
- FK Partizan Susek
- FK Plavi Dunav
- FK Polet Aleksandrovac
- FK Polet Sivac
- FK Polet Nakovo
- FK Polet Trbušani
- FK Poreč Donji Milanovac

=== R ===
- FK Radnik Stari Tamiš
- FK Rudna Glava
- FK Rusin Ruski Krstur

=== S ===
- FK Spartak Ljig
- FK Slavija Kragujevac
- FK Sloga Despotovac
- FK Stanovo Kragujevac
- FK Sloga Lipovica
- FK Sloga Miloševac
- FK Sloboda Lipe
- FK Socanica Leposavic
- FK Sloga Čonoplja

=== T ===
- FK Tempo Sefkerin
- FK Trepča

=== V ===
- FK Vrbas
- FK Vinogradar

=== Z ===
- FK Zadrugar Lajkovac
- FK Železničar Inđija
- FK Železničar Novi Sad
- FK Železničar Niš
- FK Železničar 1930
- FK Zlatar Nova Varoš
- FK Zlatibor Čajetina
- FK Zlot
- FK ŽAK Kikinda
- FK ŽSK Žabalj

== See also ==
- List of football clubs in Vojvodina
- List of futsal clubs in Serbia
