= Football Association of Serbia =

Governing body of football in Serbia

UEFA
- Founded: 13 April 1919; 107 years ago (as FSJ); January 2006; 20 years ago (as FSS)
- Headquarters: Belgrade
- FIFA affiliation: 1921; 105 years ago (temporary); 1923; 103 years ago (permanent)
- UEFA affiliation: 1954
- President: Dragan Džajić
- Website: www.fss.rs

The Football Association of Serbia (Serbian: Фудбалски савез Србије, ФСС / Fudbalski savez Srbije, FSS) is the governing body of football in Serbia, based in Belgrade. It organizes Serbian football leagues, namely the Serbian Superliga, the Serbia national football team, as well as the Second Leagues.

FSS was part of the Football Association of Yugoslavia, which was founded in April 13, 1919 in Zagreb then the new Football Association of Serbia and Montenegro in 2003. It was established as Football Association of Serbia in 2006 after the split of Montenegro and Serbia as two different independent countries. Javier Clemente was appointed the first coach of the Serbia national football team.

== Symbols ==
After receiving 150 proposals, in December 2006, the commission has decided to accept solution submitted by the Belgrade architect Nikola Vujisić. Next to new Serbian Army symbols, Serbian Football Association has revived the smallest element of the Serbian Coat of arms. The white cross and 4 firesteelers are on a red background shield, with the golden frame and golden ball in the middle of the cross. Cyrillic name of the country (Србија) is above in white on golden background. The flag of the Serbian FA is blue, with the golden fringe for indoor use, and the new emblem in the middle.

== Current champions ==
Competitions	Men	Women
National League	Crvena zvezda (2025–26)	Crvena zvezda (2025–26)
National Cup	Crvena zvezda (2025–26)	Crvena zvezda (2024–25)

== Current head coaches ==
As of 8 January 2026

Men's Team	Name
National team	(Serbia) Veljko Paunović
Under-23 team	(Serbia) Milan Rastavac
Under-21 team	(Serbia) Zoran Mirković
Under-20 team	Vacant
Under-19 team	(Serbia) Gordan Petrić
Under-18 team	(Serbia) Milan Stegnjaić
Under-17 team	(Serbia) Igor Matić
Under-16 team	(Serbia) Radovan Krivokapić
Futsal team	(Serbia) Marko Gavrilović

Women's Team	Name
National team	(Serbia) Lidija Stojkanović
Under-19 team	(Serbia) Dragiša Zečević
Under-17 team	(Serbia) Aleksandar Petrović

== Association presidents ==
- (Serbia) Zvezdan Terzić (July 2006 – March 2008)
- (Serbia) Tomislav Karadžić (March 2008 – May 2016)
- (Serbia) Slaviša Kokeza (May 2016 – March 2021)
- (Serbia) Marko Pantelić (Acting, March 2021 – May 2021)
- (Serbia) Nenad Bjeković (Acting, May 2021 – Mar 2023)
- (Serbia) Dragan Džajić (March 2023 – present)

== Current sponsorships ==
- Capelli Sport - Official sponsor
- Nektar pivo - Banjalučka pivara - Official sponsor
- Telekom Srbija - Official sponsor
- Vujić Voda - Official sponsor
- Lasta Beograd - Official sponsor
- Saobraćajni Institut CIP - Official sponsor
- EKO Serbia - Official sponsor

== See also ==
- List of football clubs in Serbia
- Serbia national football team
- Serbia national under-21 football team
- Serbia national under-19 football team
- Serbian Superliga
- Serbian Cup
- Serbian Prva Futsal Liga
- Serbia national futsal team
- List of futsal clubs in Serbia
