= List of football clubs in Vojvodina =

This is a list of football clubs located in Vojvodina, Serbia and the leagues and divisions they play in 2023–24 season, as well as some other notable football clubs that play in the Serbian football league system.

== Superliga (Top tier) ==
- FK Donji Srem
- FK Spartak Zlatibor Voda
- FK Vojvodina

== Prva liga (Second tier) ==
- FK Bačka Bačka Palanka
- FK Inđija
- FK Proleter Novi Sad

== Serbian League Vojvodina (Third tier) ==
- FK Banat Zrenjanin
- FK Bačka 1901
- FK Cement Beočin
- FK ČSK Pivara
- FK Dinamo Pančevo
- FK Dolina Padina
- FK Dunav Stari Banovci
- FK Palić
- FK PIK Prigrevica
- FK Radnički Nova Pazova
- FK Radnički Sombor
- FK Radnički Sremska Mitrovica
- FK Radnički Šid
- FK Senta
- FK Sloga Temerin
- FK Vršac

== Zone Leagues (Fourth tier) ==
=== Banat Zone League ===
- FK Borac Sakule
- FK Borac Starčevo
- FK Budućnost Srpska Crnja
- FK Crvena Zvezda Rusko Selo
- FK Jedinstvo Banatsko Karađorđevo
- FK Jedinstvo Novi Bečej
- OFK Kikinda
- FK Kozara Banatsko Veliko Selo
- FK Mladost Bambi Lukićevo
- FK Proleter Banatski Karlovac
- FK Radnički Kovin
- FK Radnički Sutjeska
- FK Sloboda Novi Kozarci
- FK Sloga Plandište
- OFK Vršac United
- FK Železničar Pančevo

=== Bačka Zone League ===
- FK Bačka Pačir
- FK Jadran Feketić
- OFK Mladost Apatin
- OFK Odžaci
- FK Olimpija Gunaroš
- FK Polet Sivac
- FK Preporod Novi Žednik
- FK Srbobran
- FK Subotica
- FK Tavankut
- FK Tekstilac Odžaci
- FK Tisa Adorjan
- FK TSC Bačka Topola
- OFK Vrbas
- FK Zadrugar Srpski Miletić
- FK ŽAK Sombor

=== Novi Sad-Syrmia Zone League ===
- FK Borac Novi Sad
- FK Budućnost Gložan
- FK Crvena Zvezda Novi Sad
- FK Graničar 1924 Adaševci
- FK Hajduk Beška
- FK Indeks Novi Sad
- FK Jedinstvo Stara Pazova
- OFK Jugović Kać
- FK Kabel
- FK Kupinovo
- FK LSK Laćarak
- FK Mladost Bački Jarak
- FK Novi Sad
- FK Omladinac Novi Banovci
- FK Sloga Erdevik
- FK ŽSK Žabalj

== Područne lige (Fifth tier) (2013–14) ==
=== PFL Pančevo ===
- FK BAK Bela Crkva
- FK Budućnost Alibunar
- FK Crvena Zvezda Pavliš
- FK Jugoslavija Jabuka
- FK Kolonija Kovin
- FK Mladost Omoljica
- FK Partizan Gaj
- FK Polet Izbište
- FK Radnički Baranda
- FK Slavija Kovačica
- FK Sloga Banatsko Novo Selo
- FK Sloga Plandište
- FK Tempo Sefkerin
- FK Vojvodina Crepaja
- FK Vulturul Grebenac
- FK Železničar Pančevo

=== PFL Subotica ===
- FK AFK Ada
- FK Bajša
- FK Bačka Mol
- FK Čantavir
- FK Čoka
- FK Jadran Feketić
- FK Krivaja
- FK Njegoš Lovćenac
- FK Olimpija Gunaroš
- FK Olimpija Totovo Selo
- FK Panonija IM Topola
- FK Preporod Novi Žednik
- FK Proleter Njegoševo
- FK Subotica
- FK Tavankut
- FK Vinogradar Hajdukovo

=== PFL Zrenjanin ===
- FK Begej Žitište
- FK Borac Aleksandrovo
- FK Crvena Zvezda Vojvoda Stepa
- FK Jedinstvo Bočar
- FK Krajina Krajišnik
- FK Mladost Bambi Lukićevo
- FK Naftagas Elemir
- FK Omladinac Ravni Topolovac
- FK Potisje Knićanin
- FK Radnički Sutjeska
- FK Radnički Zrenjanin
- FK Rusanda Melenci
- FK Vojvodina Bašaid
- FK Vojvodina Novo Miloševo
- FK Vojvodina Perlez
- FK Zadrugar Lazarevo

=== PFL Novi Sad ===
- FK Borac Šajkaš
- FK Budućnost Gložan
- FK Budućnost Mladenovo
- FK Jedinstvo Rumenka
- FK Kabel
- FK Mladost Bački Petrovac
- FK Mladost Novi Sad
- FK Mladost Turija
- FK Petrovaradin
- FK Sutjeska Bačko Dobro Polje
- FK TSK Temerin
- FK Tvrđava Bač
- FK Veternik
- FK Vojvodina Bačko Gradište
- FK Vojvodina Tovariševo
- FK ŽSK Žabalj

=== PFL Sombor ===
- FK Borac Bački Gračac
- FK BSK Bački Brestovac
- FK Crvenka
- FK Graničar Gakovo
- FK Hajduk Stapar
- FK Kordun Kljajićevo
- FK Kula
- OFK Mladost Apatin
- OFK Odžaci
- FK Omladinac Bukovac
- FK Omladinac Deronje
- FK Polet Karavukovo
- FK Sloga Čonoplja
- FK Zadrugar Srpski Miletić
- FK ŽAK Sombor

=== PFL Sremska Mitrovica ===
- FK 1. Maj Agroruma
- FK Budućnost Salaš Noćajski
- FK Donji Petrovci
- FK Hajduk Višnjičevo
- FK Hajduk 1932 Šimanovci
- FK Hrtkovci
- FK Jadran Golubinci
- FK Kupinovo
- FK Ljukovo
- FK LSK Laćarak
- FK Partizan Vitojevci
- FK Radnički Irig
- FK Rudar Vrdnik
- FK Sloven Ruma
- FK Sremac Vojka
- FK Železničar Inđija

== Others ==
=== 0-9 ===
- FK 1. Oktobar Srpski Itebej
- FK 2. Oktobar Kumane

=== A ===
- FK AS Kačarevo
- FK ASK Aradac
- FK AFK Ada

=== B ===
- FK Bačka Begeč
- FK Bečej 1908
- FK Borac Iđoš
- FK Borac Klenak
- FK Borac Rakovac
- FK Borac Veliko Središte
- FK Borac Stejanovci
- OFK Bosut
- OFK Brestač
- FK Budućnost Banatski Dvor
- FK Budućnost Savino Selo

=== C ===
- FK Čenej

=== D ===
- FK Delija Mokrin
- FK Dinamo Sonta
- FK Dobrica
- FK Dunav Bački Monoštor
- FK Dunav Banatska Palanka

=== E ===
- FK Eđšeg Mali Iđoš
- FK Elektrovojvodina Subotica

=== F ===
- FK Fruškogorac Mali Radinci
- FK Fruškogorac Manđelos
- FK Fruškogorac Sremska Kamenica
- OFK Futog

=== G ===
- FK Glogonj

=== H ===
- FK Hajdučica
- FK Hajduk Bačko Dušanovo
- FK Hajduk Čurug
- FK Hajduk Divoš
- OFK Hajduk Kula
- FK Hercegovac Gajdobra

=== J ===
- FK Jedinstvo Ečka
- FK Jedinstvo Ljuba
- FK Jedinstvo Morović
- FK Jedinstvo Ruma
- FK Jedinstvo Stević Kačarevo

=== K ===
- OFK Klek
- FK Krila Krajine
- FK Krivanj
- FK Krušedol
- FK Kulpin

=== L ===
- FK Lipar

=== M ===
- FK Maglić
- FK Mićunovo
- FK Mitros Sremska Mitrovica
- FK Mladost Banatski Despotovac
- FK Mladost 1952 Gornja Rogatica
- FK Mladost Kruščić
- FK Mladost Vojlovica
- FK Mladost Radost Srbobran

=== N ===
- FK Naftagas Boka
- FK Napredak Banatska Topola
- FK Napredak Čestereg
- FK Napredak Popinci
- FK Napredak Žarkovac

=== O ===
- FK Obilić Novi Kneževac
- FK Obilić Zmajevo
- FK Omladinac Deliblato
- FK Omladinac Opovo

=== P ===
- FK Plavi Dunav
- FK Podrinje Mačvanska Mitrovica
- FK Podunavac Belegiš
- FK Polet Idvor
- FK Polet Nakovo
- FK Potisje Kanjiža
- FK Proleter Banoštor
- FK Proleter Neuzina
- FK Proleter Ravno Selo
- FK Proleter 2006 Zrenjanin
- FK PSK Putinci

=== R ===
- FK Radnički 1905 Bajmok
- FK Radnički 1918 Ratkovo
- FK Ratar Kruščica
- FK Rusin Ruski Krstur

=== S ===
- FK Šajkaš 1908 Kovilj
- FK Ševac Kusić
- OFK Sirig
- FK Slavija Novi Sad
- FK Sloga Ostojićevo
- FK Sofeks Futog
- FK Spartak Debeljača
- FK Sremac Čerević
- FK Stari Tamiš
- FK Strela Ivanovo
- FK Susek

=== T ===
- FK Tatra Kisač
- FK Terekves Hetin
- FK Tisa Padej
- FK Titel

=== U ===
- FK Unirea Uzdin

=== V ===
- FK Vajska
- FK Vinogradar Ledinci
- FK Vojvodina Crvena Crkva

=== Z ===
- FK ŽAK Kikinda
- OFK Zeka Buljubaša Ravnje
- FK Železničar Novi Sad
- FK Zrinjski 1932 Subotica

== See also ==
- List of football clubs in Serbia
