= Bosut (disambiguation) =

The Bosut is a river in Croatia and Serbia.

Bosut may also refer to:

- Bosut, Sremska Mitrovica, a Serbian village
- Bosut Forest, Spačva basin, Serbia
- Bosut culture, a prehistoric Iron Age culture
- OFK Bosut - see List of football clubs in Vojvodina, Serbia
- RML-334 Bosut, a Neštin-class river minesweeper of the former Yugoslav Navy
