= Slaviša Kokeza =

Serbian businessman, footballer, and football administrator

- Славиша Кокеза
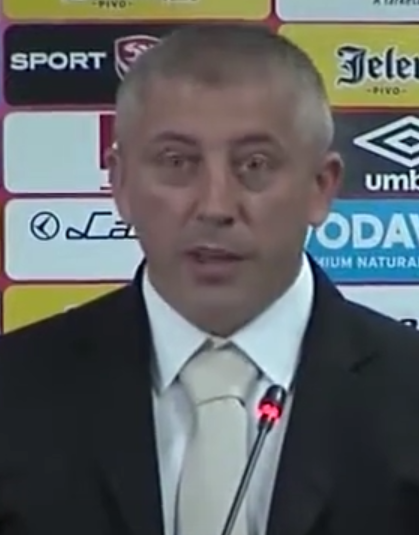
- Kokeza in 2016

President of the Football Association of Serbia
- In office 20 May 2016 – 22 March 2021
- Preceded by: Tomislav Karadžić
- Succeeded by: Marko Pantelić (acting)

Personal details
- Born: 7 July 1977 (age 48) Sarajevo, SR Bosnia and Herzegovina, SFR Yugoslavia
- Party: SNS (2008–present); SRS (until 2008)
- Occupation: Football executive, businessman

Slaviša Kokeza (Serbian Cyrillic: Славиша Кокеза, pronounced [slǎʋiʃa kokêza, - kǒː-]; born 7 July 1977) is a Serbian businessman, football administrator and former player. Between 20 May 2016 to 22 March 2021, he served as the president of the Football Association of Serbia (FSS).

== Early life and football career ==
Kokeza was born on 7 July 1977 to a Bosnian Serb family in Sarajevo, at the time part of SR Bosnia and Herzegovina and SFR Yugoslavia.

He started his football career in NK Čelik Zenica, playing in the youth teams in the period from 1985 to 1991. In the senior competition, he played for FK Brodarac from New Belgrade, and in this club he spent the period from 1999 to 2014 as a football player and as an official.

== Political involvement ==
He was a member of the far-right Serbian Radical Party (SRS), and after the founding of the Serbian Progressive Party (SNS) in 2008, he became a member and an official of that party. He is a member of the Main Board and vice president of the Belgrade SNS board.

The general public first heard about him in July 2008, when he appeared at a press conference of the Serbian Radical Party, sitting next to the then deputy president of the SRS, Tomislav Nikolić, and general secretary, Aleksandar Vučić. Kokeza was reportedly injured by the police at a rally organized by the Radicals on the Republic Square to protest the arrest of Radovan Karadzic.

== Business career ==
According to the data of the Business Registers Agency, Kokeza is a 100% owner of at least three companies - "Eurosalon Fabrika", "Senior team doo" and "Best Contact". He has an ownership share in several other companies, among others in a company called "Happy Millionaire". Some of his companies are registered at the same address as the company "Prointer IT Solutions and Services, Belgrade". That company recently took over the company "Alti", which owns the chain of IT equipment stores "WinWin". The former president of the Democratic Party Bojan Pajtić stated that close associates of the then Prime Minister of Serbia Aleksandar Vučić and Slaviša Kokeza, "established a monopoly over the IT market of Serbia".

In July 2017, Eddie Bernice Johnson, a member of the United States Congress, urged Vice President Mike Pence not to meet Serbia’s President, Aleksandar Vučić, citing among other reasons the relations between President Vučić's brother, Andrej Vučić, and Russian tycoons. She noted reports that allege that Andrej Vučić and his four close associates, with one of them being Kokeza himself, "continue to consolidate all infrastructure and public work projects". The reports also allege their close relationship with Alexander Babakov, a member of the State Duma from President Vladimir Putin’s United Russia party.

== Football administration career ==
As an active football player in the period from 2009 to 2011 he became the director of FK Brodarac, and from 2011 to 2012 he was the general director of FK Zemun. In December 2012, at the regular Assembly of the Red Star Belgrade, he was elected vice president of the Board of Directors of the club. In August 2015, he resigned from that position citing dissatisfaction of fans and disagreement with other board members

In mid-November 2014, he was proposed for the president of the Football Association of Belgrade, and he was elected to that position at the extraordinary Assembly of the Football Federation of Belgrade, which was held on 22 December 2014. He served as the vice president of the Executive Board of the Football Association of Serbia from 2015 and on 20 May 2016 he was elected president of the Football Association in Serbia and has been at that position ever since then.

On 28 February 2021 Kokeza was detained and questioned by the police in connection with arrests of several members of Grobari football fan group accused of murder, kidnapping and drug trafficking. According to the internal affairs minister Aleksandar Vulin, Kokeza refused polygraph testing, while Vulin also stated that the police has significant doubts about the truthfulness of Kokeza's answers at the hearing. Kokeza refused to answer whether he was involved in the alleged plot to assassinate the president of Serbia Aleksandar Vučić. Afterwards, Vučić stated that he "cannot believe" that Kokeza, "a man he trusted", refused to do the polygraph testing. Kokeza resigned on 22 March 2021 following the controversy and allegations of his involvement with organized crime.

== Personal life ==
On 14 March 2020, Kokeza tested positive for COVID-19.
