= Tomislav Karadžić =

Montenegrin Serb businessman and football administrator

President of the Football Association of Serbia
- In office 15 July 2008 – 20 May 2016
- Preceded by: Zvezdan Terzić
- Succeeded by: Slaviša Kokeza

President of FK Partizan
- In office 26 April 2007 – 15 July 2008
- Preceded by: Nenad Popović
- Succeeded by: Dragan Đurić

Personal details
- Born: 10 February 1939 (age 87) Petnjica, Šavnik, Kingdom of Yugoslavia

Tomislav "Tole" Karadžić (Serbian Cyrillic: Томислав Толе Караџић; born 10 February 1939) is a Serbian businessman and football administrator. From 2008 to 2016, he served as the president of the Football Association of Serbia (FSS).

== Career ==
Karadžić served two terms as president of FK Spartak Subotica during the 1980s. He was named honorable citizen of Subotica in 2021.

From 2005 until 2006 Karadžić was the president of Football Association of Serbia and Montenegro (FSSCG). Prior to that he was the president of the regional FA (Football Association of Vojvodina), the job he performed for 18 years. On 25 September 2007, Karadžić became the president of FK Partizan where he came following the decades-long reign of Nenad Bjeković, Žarko Zečević, and Ivan Ćurković at the club.

Simultaneously, Karadžić kept a position at the Serbian FA where he was a deputy to the association's president Zvezdan Terzić. In March 2008, Terzić fled the country after getting indicted for embezzlement of player transfer funds and Karadžić took over his role as FA president. During summer 2008 new elections were held for the FSS presidency. Karadžić beat out Dragan Aca Bulić.

== Controversy and criticism ==
=== 1961 prison stay ===
During his university days in Belgrade, after beating up a fellow student in the faculty commissary and causing him injuries that reportedly led to the victim losing an eye, twenty-two-year-old Karadžić was charged with aggravated assault in 1961 and sentenced to a year-and-a-half prison term. However, under unclear circumstances, Karadžić was released after only 6 months in the Spuž prison.

The incident briefly came back into public focus during August 2013 while Karadžić publicly clashed with the Red Star Belgrade club vice-president Nebojša Čović over ongoing Serbian SuperLiga administrative issues.

=== Irregularities in player sales and match-fixing ===
For many years, Karadžić has been heavily criticized by public due to various reasons and decisions, which had catastrophic consequences for the Serbian football. After numerous serious irregularities in player sales (mostly for young players), serious suspicions of match-fixing, and an impending boycott of the Serbian top club Red Star Belgrade combined with sharp criticism of over half of the clubs in Serbian SuperLiga, Karadžić announced his resignation in late 2013.

When criticism became public, he was in Budva on holiday, so therefore he didn't comment it in details, but referred to his critics as criminals. His adversary Zvezdan Terzić — a football administrator who also drew strong criticism by Serbian public for of similar reasons — called for the convening of a special meeting of the Federation Parliament and the immediate withdrawal. However, Karadžić not resigned and since then is even more under criticism. Accusations against him for administrative abuse, monopoly, and clientelism have been continued.

=== Chants against Karadžić ===
For a certain time, during the league matches, fans frequently start a chant against him which says "Tole, lopove!" (Tole, you are a thief!). Mostly Delije chanted this, while Grobari showed support for Tole since he was the president of FK Partizan and were against Zvezdan Terzić and Slaviša Kokeza, Tole's main enemies and critics. They sang "Ajmo Grobari, ajmo svi u glas, Tomislav Karadžić jedan je od nas" (Come on Grobari, sing out loud, Tomislav Karadžić is one of us). These chants have been sung even during the matches of the Serbia national team.
