= Laćarak =

Laćarak Лаћарак (Serbian)
- Village (Selo)
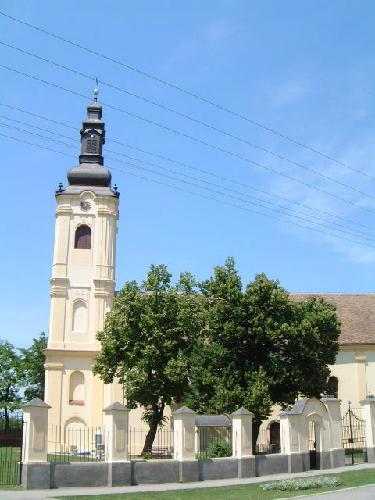
- Serbian Orthodox church

- Location within Vojvodina Location within Serbia Location within Europe
- Coordinates: 45°0′N 19°34′E
- Country: Serbia
- Province: Vojvodina
- Region: Syrmia
- District: Srem
- Municipality: Sremska Mitrovica

Area
  - Total: 54.51 km^{2} (21.05 sq mi)
- Elevation: 78 m (256 ft)

Population (2011)
  - Total: 10,638
  - Density: 195.2/km^{2} (505.5/sq mi)
- Time zone: UTC+1 (CET)
  - Summer (DST): UTC+2 (CEST)

Laćarak (Serbian Cyrillic: Лаћарак, pronounced [ˈlât͜ɕarak]) is a village located in the municipality of Sremska Mitrovica, Serbia. The settlement has a Serb ethnic majority and its population numbering 10,638 inhabitants (as of 2011 census).

== History ==
Following Ottoman retreat from the region, the Lordship of Ilok and Upper Syrmia was established, and the village became part of its domain.

== Historical population ==
- 1961: 5,902
- 1971: 8,121
- 1981: 9,718
- 1991: 10,235
- 2002: 10,893
- 2011: 10,638

== Sports ==
Local football club LSK Laćarak plays on the fourth level of Serbian football as of the 2025-26 season.

== See also ==
- List of places in Serbia
- List of cities, towns and villages in Vojvodina
