= FK Borac Ostružnica =

Borac Ostružnica
- Full name: Fudbalski Klub Borac Ostružnica
- Nickname: Alasi
- Founded: 1931; 94 years ago
- Ground: Stadium FK Borac, Ostružnica
- Capacity: 500
- League: Belgrade First League
- 2024–25: Belgrade First League, 8th
Home colours	Away colours

FK Borac (Serbian Cyrillic: ФК Борац Остружница) is a football club based in Ostružnica, Serbia. Founded in 1931, they compete in the 5th-tier Belgrade First League.

== History ==
FK Borac participated in the qualifications for the 2010–11 Serbian Cup.

=== Recent league history ===
Season	Division	P	W	D	L	F	A	Pts	Pos
2020–21	Belgrade First League	30	16	8	6	61	38	56	3rd
2021–22	Belgrade First League	26	12	6	8	38	32	42	5th
2022–23	Belgrade First League	26	17	3	6	67	22	54	3rd
2023–24	Belgrade First League	26	9	11	6	39	32	38	8th
2024–25	Belgrade First League	26	12	3	11	35	41	39	8th
