= Dragiša Zečević =

Serbian footballer and coach (born 1980)

Personal information
- Date of birth: 5 November 1980 (age 45)
- Place of birth: Zrenjanin, SR Serbia, SFR Yugoslavia
- Positions: Midfielder; left back

Senior career*
Years	Team	Apps	(Gls)
1998–2000	Proleter Zrenjanin		
1999	Radnički Zrenjanin		
1999–2000	Budućnost Banatski Dvor		
2000–2001	Tabor Sežana	14	(1)
2001–2002	Spartak Subotica		
2003	Komgrap		

Managerial career
- 2022–2025: Serbia A Women
- 2017–2022: Serbia Women U17
- 2016–2017: Rad (assistant)
- 2015–2016: Proleter Vranovo
- 2013–2015: IM Rakovica (assistant)
- 2011–2013: Zemun (assistant)
- 2007–2011: Rad (youth)
- 2007–2008: BASK (assistant)
- 2004–2007: Borac Aleksandrovo
- * Club domestic league appearances and goals

Dragiša Zečević (born November 5, 1980) is a Serbian football coach and former player who played as a midfielder and left-back. He is notable for his tenure as head coach of the Serbia women's national football team, during which he led the team to several historic milestones, including their first-ever playoff for the UEFA Women's European Championship.

== Managerial career ==
=== Serbia women's national team ===
Zečević served as the head coach of the Serbia women's national team, achieving significant progress in international competitions.

==== UEFA Women's Nations League 2023–24 ====
Under Zečević's leadership, Serbia competed in League B of the 2023–24 UEFA Women's Nations League, finishing first in their group and advancing to the promotion playoff against Iceland.

Group stage results:

- 22 September 2023: Ukraine 1–2 Serbia
- 26 September 2023: Serbia 4–0 Greece
- 27 October 2023: Poland 2–1 Serbia
- 31 October 2023: Serbia 1–1 Poland
- 1 December 2023: Greece 0–2 Serbia
- 5 December 2023: Serbia 0–1 Ukraine

Promotion playoff:

- 23 February 2024: Serbia 1–1 Iceland
- 27 February 2024: Iceland 2–1 Serbia

==== UEFA Women's Euro 2025 qualification ====
In the UEFA Women's Euro 2025 qualifiers, Serbia secured second place in their group, trailing only Scotland, and advanced to the playoff stage.

Group stage results:

- 5 April 2024: Serbia 0–0 Scotland
- 9 April 2024: Israel 2–4 Serbia
- 31 May 2024: Serbia 2–1 Slovakia
- 4 June 2024: Slovakia 0–4 Serbia
- 12 July 2024: Serbia 1–0 Israel
- 16 July 2024: Scotland 1–0 Serbia

Playoff semifinal:

- 25 October 2024: Bosnia and Herzegovina 2–2 Serbia
- 29 October 2024: Serbia 4–1 Bosnia and Herzegovina

Playoff final:

- 28 November 2024: Serbia 0–2 Sweden
- 3 December 2024: Sweden 6–0 Serbia

Although Serbia did not qualify for the final tournament, reaching the playoff final marked a historic achievement for the team.

=== Resignation ===
Following the playoff defeat to Sweden, Zečević resigned as head coach, expressing pride in the team's accomplishments and emphasizing the need for new leadership to continue the team's development.

== Legacy ==
Zečević's tenure is remembered for:

- Leading Serbia to their first promotion playoff in the UEFA Women's Nations League
- Achieving second place in the UEFA Women's Euro 2025 qualifying group
- Guiding the team to their first-ever playoff final for the European Championship
- Integrating young talent into the national team setup
- Increasing public support and visibility for women's football in Serbia

== Youth coaching roles ==
Prior to his role with the senior national team, Zečević served as head coach for Serbia's U17 women's national team and, as of 2026, holds the position of U19 women's head coach.
