= LSK Laćarak =

- Full name: Fudbalski Klub LSK Laćarak
- Founded: 1928; 98 years ago
- Ground: Stadion u Lacarku, Laćarak
- Capacity: 360
- League: Vojvodina League South
- 2024-25: Sremska Liga, 10th
Home colours	Away colours

FK LSK Laćarak is a Serbian football club based in Laćarak, Sremska Mitrovica, Serbia. They compete in the Vojvodina League South, in the 4th tier of Serbian football after they applied for a vacant spot.

== Recent league history ==
Season	Division	P	W	D	L	F	A	Pts	Pos
2020–21	5 - PFL Sremska Mitrovica	34	5	6	23	39	91	21	17th
2021–22	6 - Intermunicipal league Srem - West	26	10	1	15	33	50	31	7th
2022–23	6 - Intermunicipal league Srem - West	26	21	3	2	83	24	66	1st
2023–24	5 - Sremska Liga	30	11	4	15	38	52	37	10th
2024–25	5 - Sremska Liga	30	11	9	10	56	45	42	10th
