= FK Plavi Dunav =

FK "Plavi Dunav" Kék Duna LE
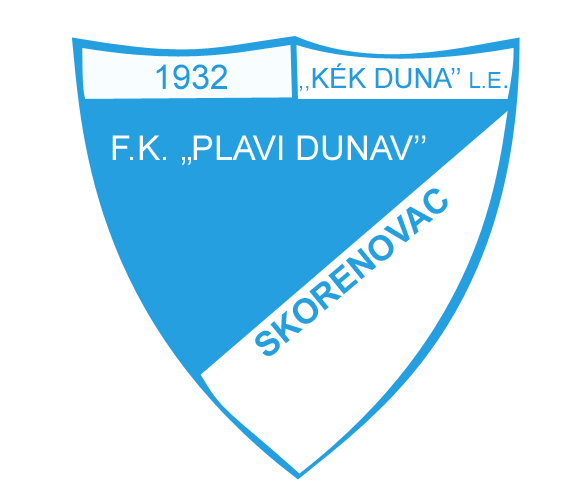
- Full name: Fudbalski Klub Plavi Dunav
- Nickname: Zöldek
- Founded: June 1932, 14; 93 years ago
- Dissolved: 2017; 9 years ago
- Ground: Igralište Plavi Dunav, Skorenovac, Serbia
- Capacity: 500
- 2015-16 (final): Second South Banat League "West" - Group South, 9th
Home colours	Away colours

FK Plavi Dunav (Hungarian: Kék Duna LE, Serbian: ФК Плави Дунав, FK Plavi Dunav, English: FC Blue Danube) was a football club from Skorenovac, Vojvodina, Serbia. The club was founded in 1932.

== Name history ==
- SCS (Sports Club Skorenovac) – ( Székelykevei Sport Club ) (1932–1949)
- FK Plavi Dunav ( Kek Duna LE ) (from 1949 to the present)

== Club history ==
Plavi Dunav was founded on June 14, 1932, under the name Székelykevei Sport Club. It was founded by former Skorenovac high school students led by Thomas and József Jung, János Hubert and Borsós József.

A key achievement to this group's success was that they were able to obtain land for a soccer field, from an area which remained part of the school's property. The judge of the village, Janoš Selić, helped them obtain this land. After that they played their first friendly matches against teams from Ivanovo, Pločica, Mramorak and Banatski Brestovac.

President of the club was Milivoj Đurkin, Vice President Imre Dr. László, Secretary Rudolf Gerhardt, Treasurer Ferenc Kúti and Supervisor authority Antal Wintergerst.

A fan support group was immediately formed for the club. Cheerleaders, whose management structure consisted of Katalin Gerhardt, Katalin Jung, Magdolna Hügel, Mariska Hügel and Mária Golob.

The first players and members of the team during the 1930s were: Antal Fazekas, János Szirák, Stanko Erdeljan, József Borsós, János Brasnyó, József Boszilkov, Pubi Hubert, István Kiss, Imre Galac, Tamás Jung, Dezsö Kovačević, István Urbán, Imre Komáromi, János Migléci, Mile Perić, Đuro Stanisavljević and Slavko Ivkov.

== Club colours ==
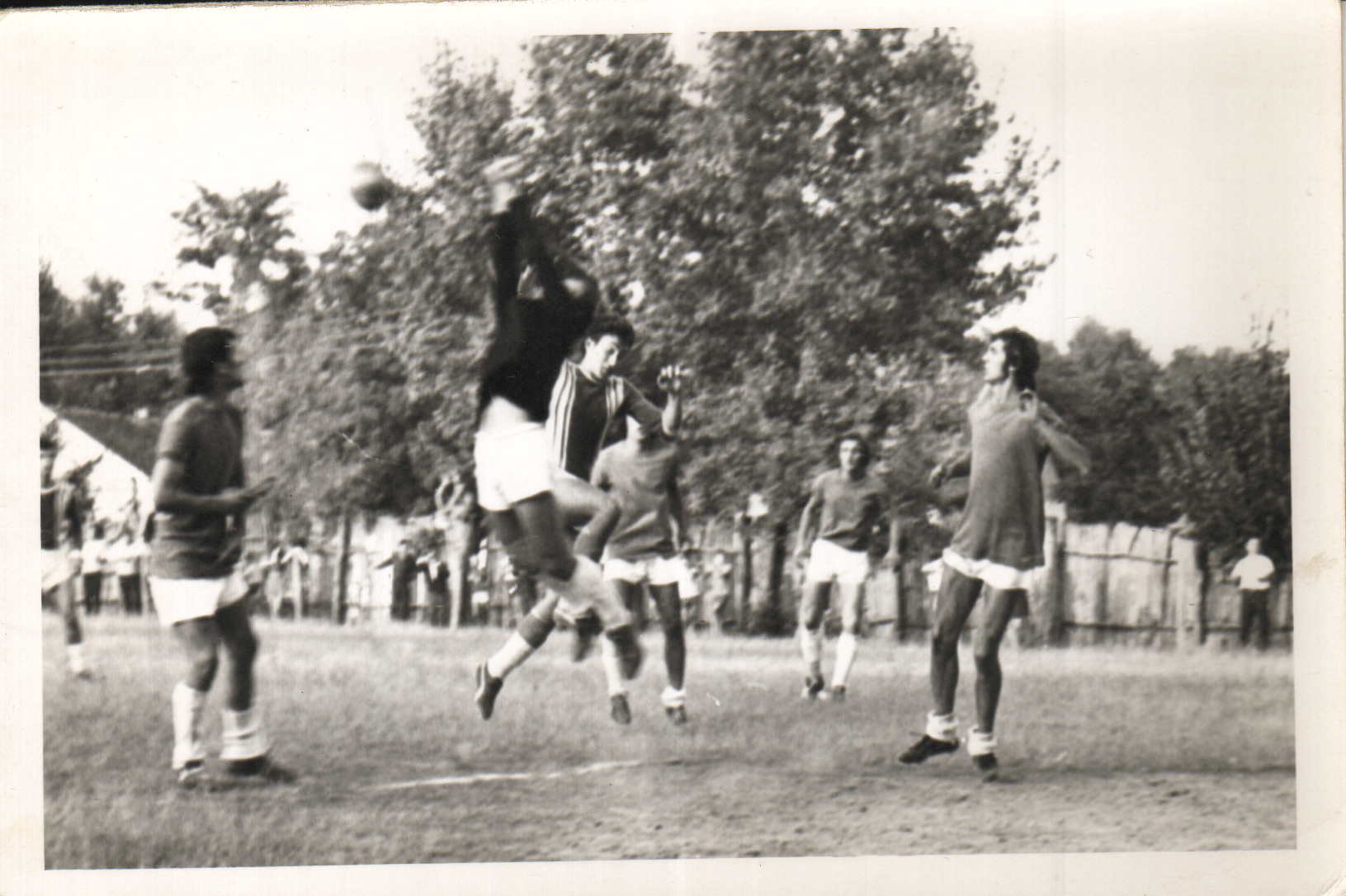
Detail from the qualification games from the 1970s

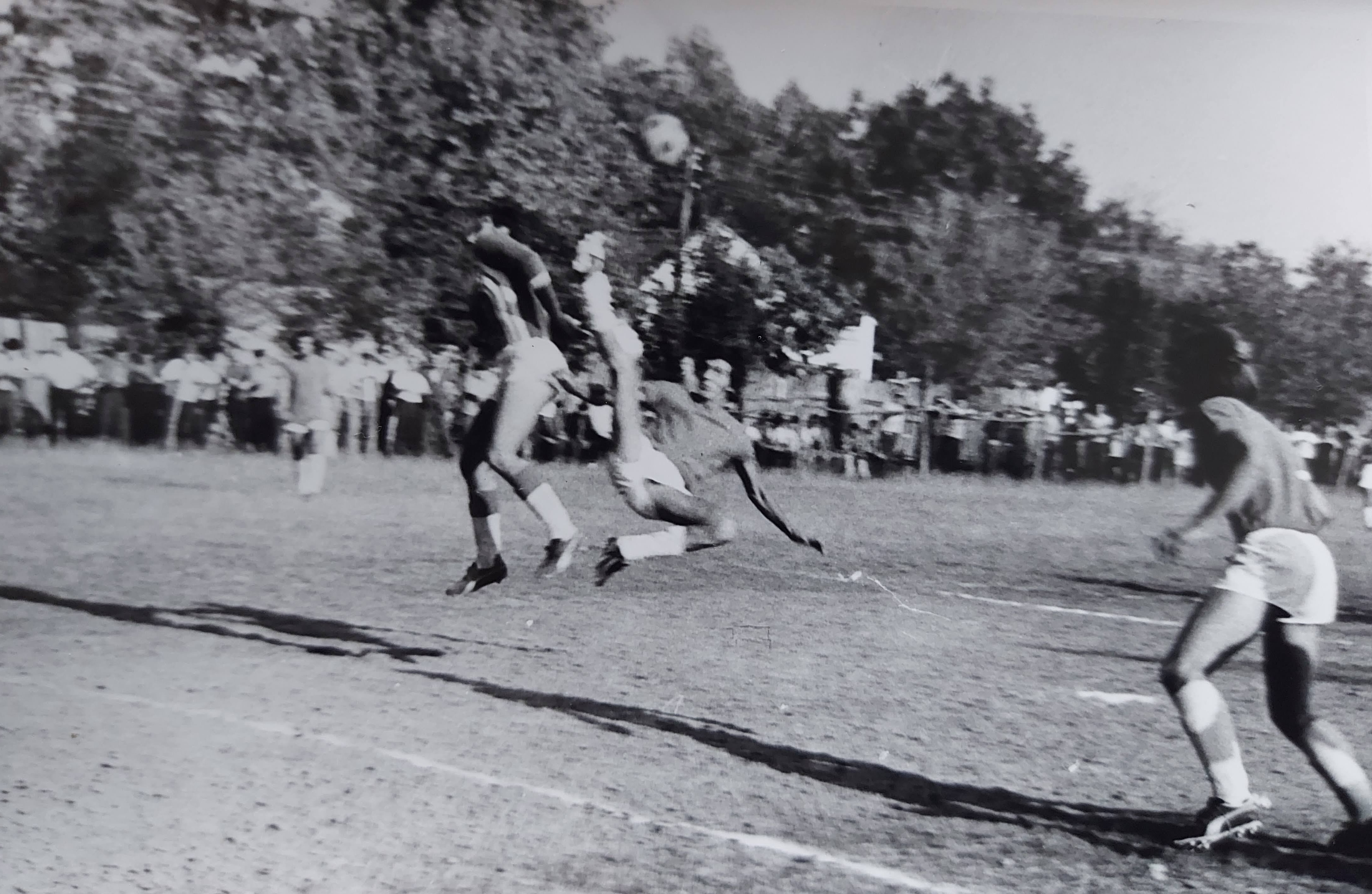
Detail from the qualification games from the 1970s

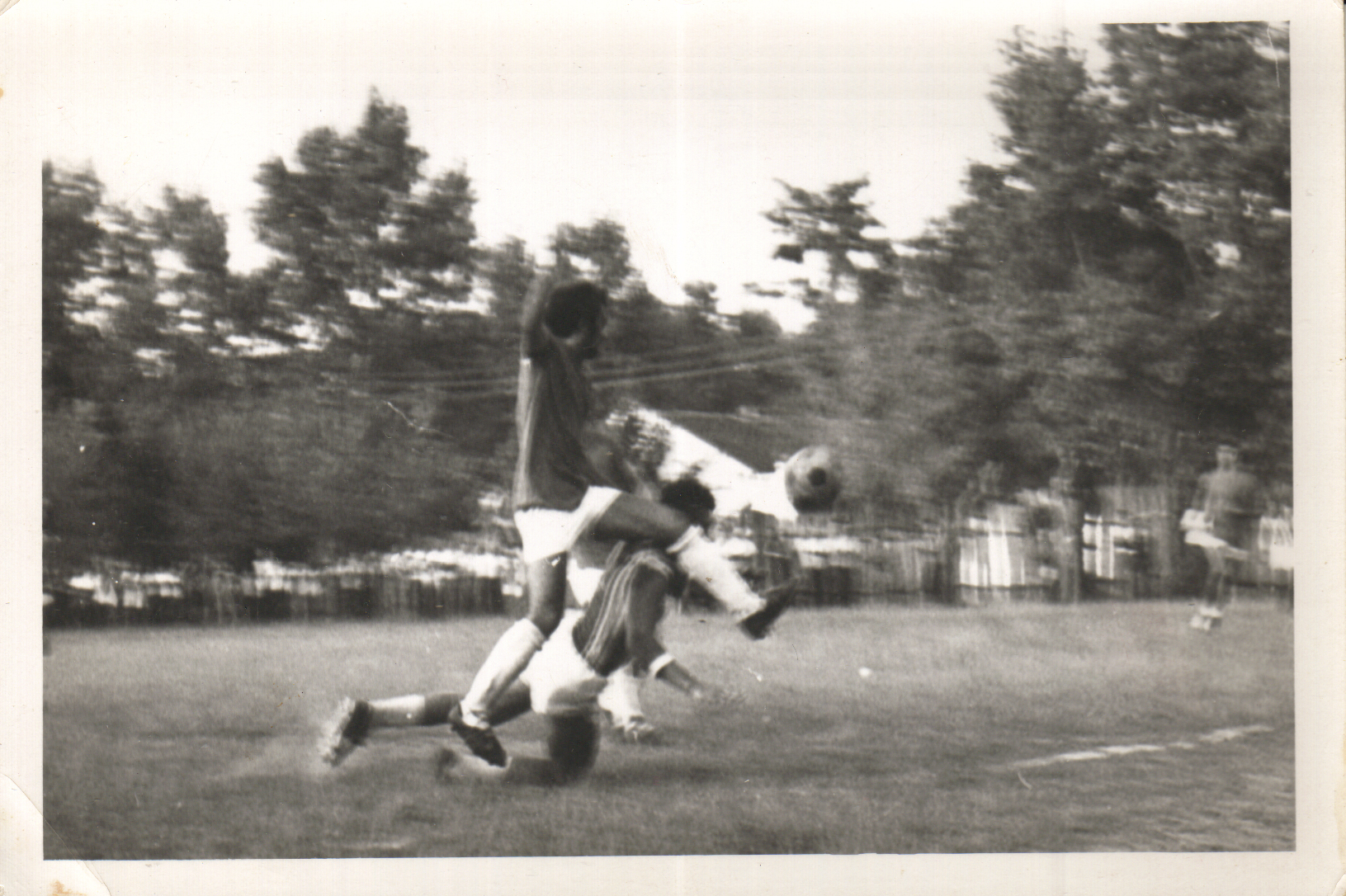
Detail of the qualifying match from 1970s

When the club was established, it was decided that players would wear a green uniform with a white collar, white shorts and green socks. Soccer shoes were made by village shoemakers.

The genuine club sportswear went missing during the year of 1946. This occurred when the club lent out team apparel to a neighbouring football club, after which it was never returned, or lost. As a result of this, the club was unable to participate in the 1946 Championship Season.

The current club colors are blue and white.

== Financing ==
During the 1930s, the club's main finances derived from voluntary contributions, theatrical performances (which were held by the support group, cheerleaders) and various dance parties that were organized in the hall of Rozsa Wintergerst restaurant.

After the Second World War, extra finances came from membership fees. During the year 1946, village authorities granted the club 3 acres (1.2 ha) of agricultural land, which the club used as a source of income. Profits went to the club's treasury. Thanks to this financial support, the club was promoted to the South Banat League of former Yugoslavia.

== Football playground ==
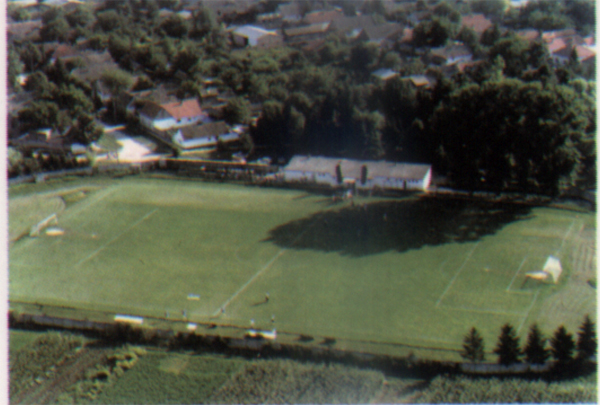
Playground of FC Plavi Dunav in Skorenovac

The club's original football grounds, which were in use from 1932 until 1970, no longer met the acceptable conditions which the football association required. The old ground was sold and a new one purchased, not far from the original location. Funding went through the club and the local community. Lumber from a forest located south of the village was sold. High quality grass from Skorenovac's meadows was also sold, to Belgrade and Split. At that time people from Skorenovac could proudly say that Yugoslavia's first division football was playing on Skorenovac's grass. At that time, arguably the best football field builder was the former, but still famous, goalkeeper of Team Yugoslavia and Red Star Belgrade, Srdjan Mrkušić. In exchange for the grass (which was used in the Red Star stadium (Marakana), and later in the stadium in Split (Hajduk, Poljud)), Mrkušić designed and constructed new football grounds for Plavi Dunav to use free of charge.

Construction of the actual field lasted for two years. Work started in 1974 and the official opening was on October 2, 1976. Plavi Dunav now had one of the best football fields in Vojvodina, with proper irrigation, drainage, excellent grass, locker rooms, bathrooms and a club restaurant.

== Achievements ==
Plavi Dunav greatest success was achieved in 1977 when the club was promoted to the First South Banat League after playing for two years in a bottom-ranked Local League. Similar success was achieved in 1947, when the club also reached the South Banat League.

During the 1980s and 1990s, FK Plavi Dunav went back and forth between the First and Second South Banat League. In recent years, the club plays between the First and Second South Banat League.

Some notable Plavi Dunavs guests were Red Star Belgrade, Dinamo from Pančevo, Radnički from Kovin, the guests from Alpar Hungary, Goce Delčev from Bulgaria, Forverc from Vienna and many other clubs from different parts of former Yugoslavia.

== Gallery ==
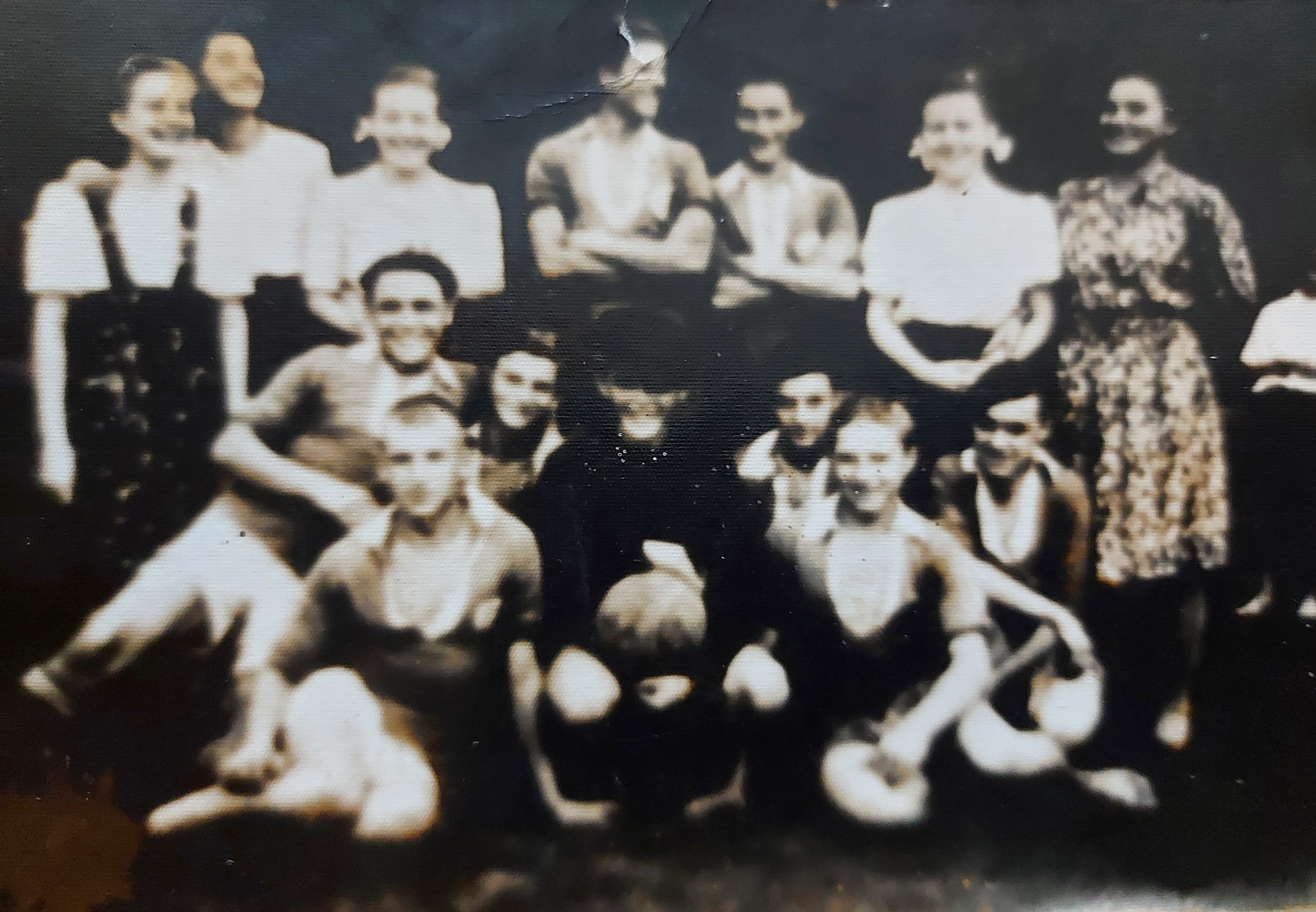
Chearleaders and players from 1940s

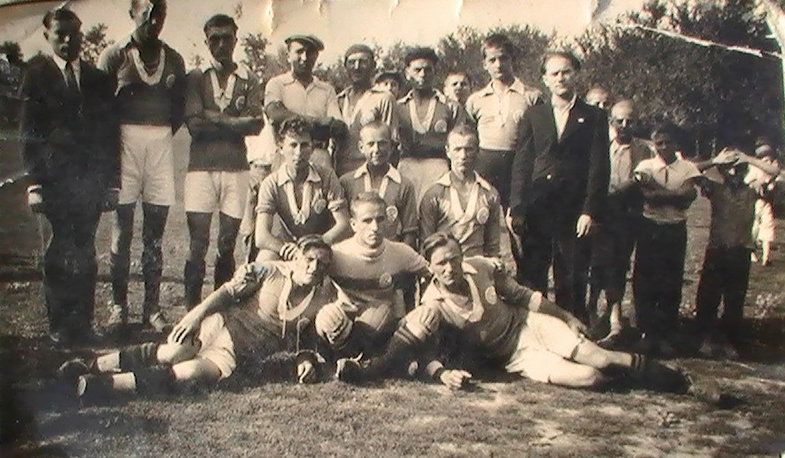
Team from 1930s

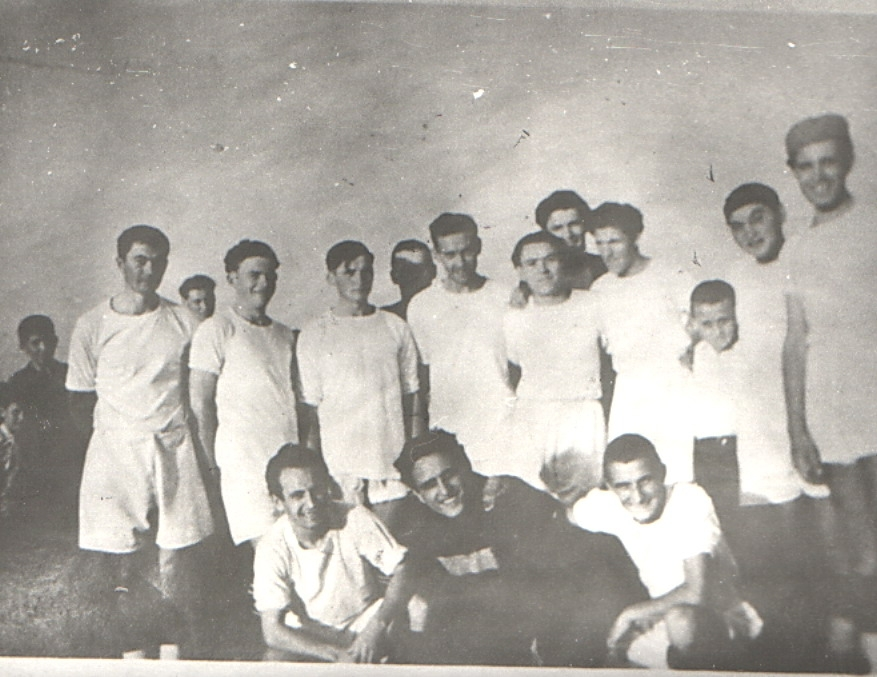
Team from 1940s

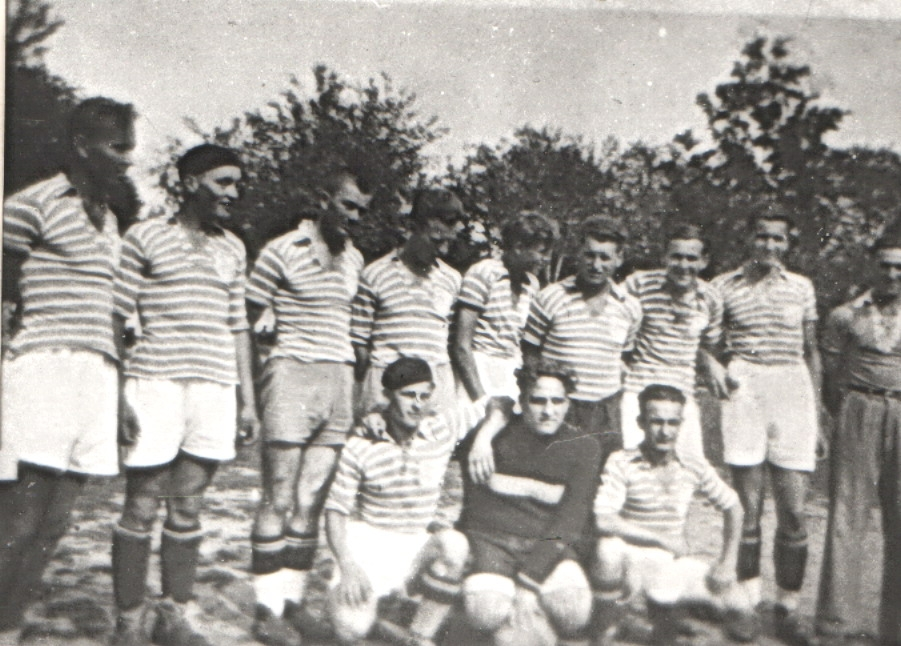
Team from beginning of 1950s

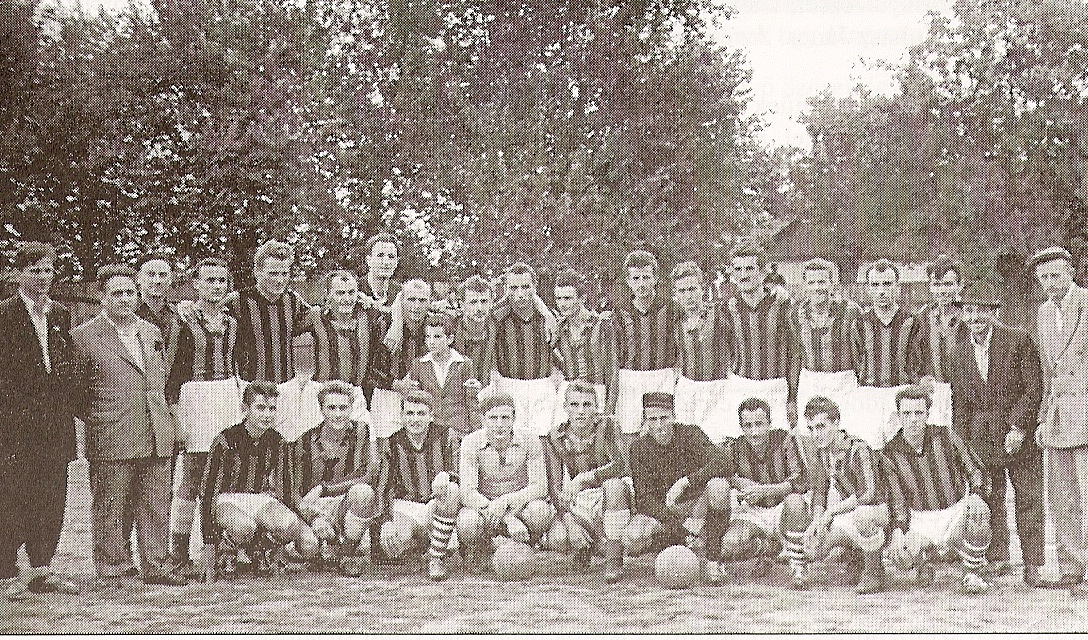
Team from 1950s

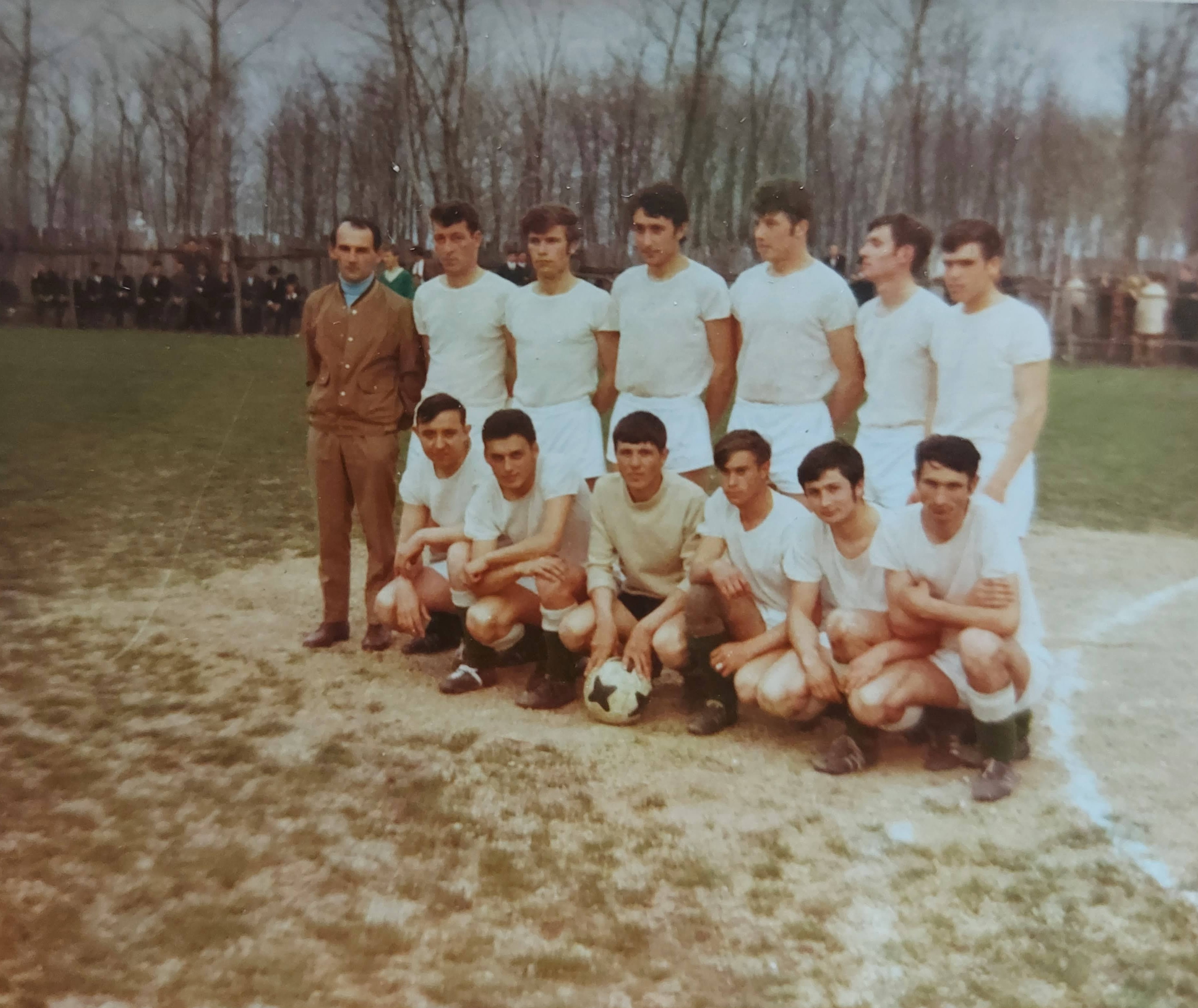
Team from 1960s

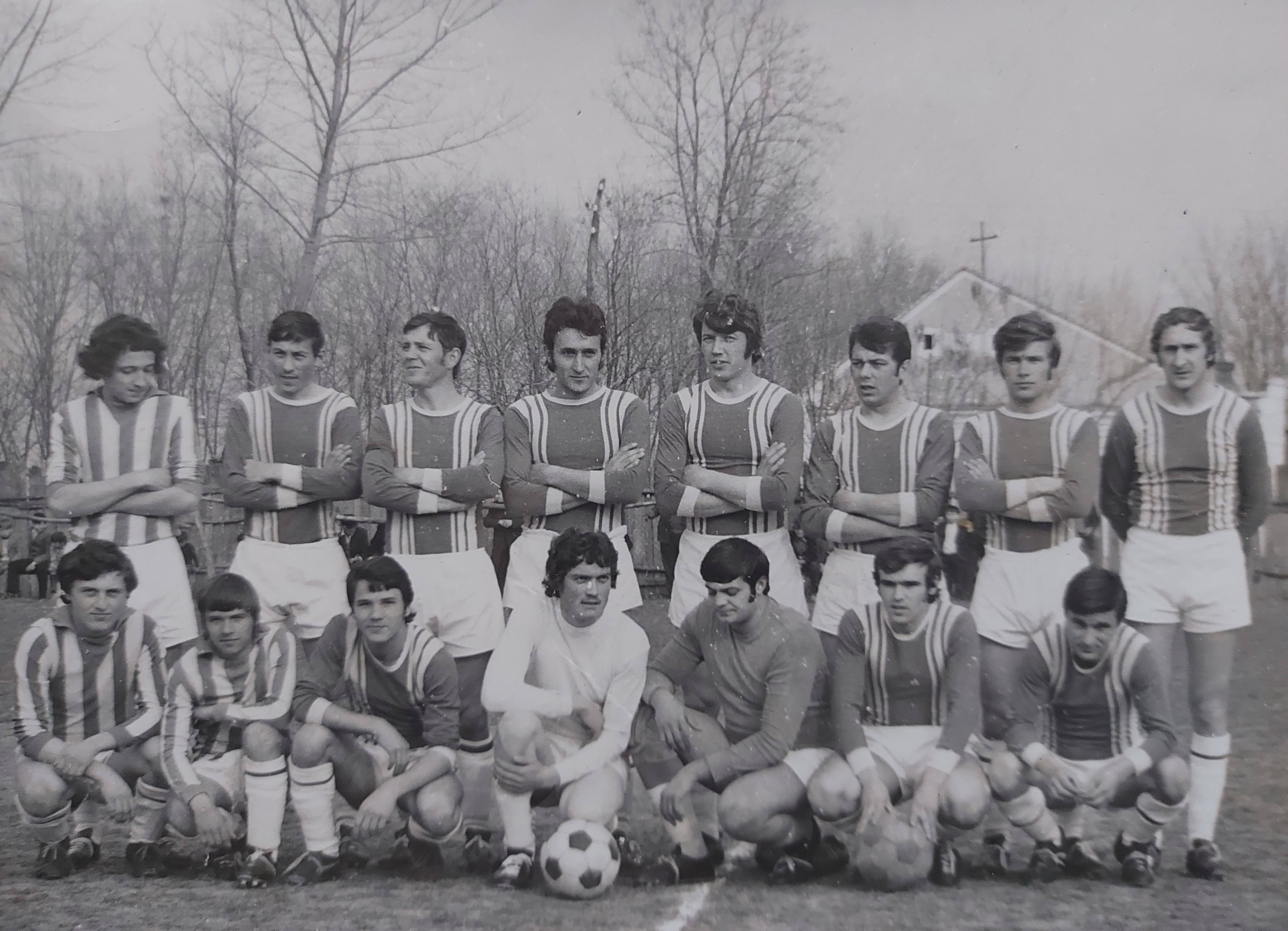
Team from 1970s

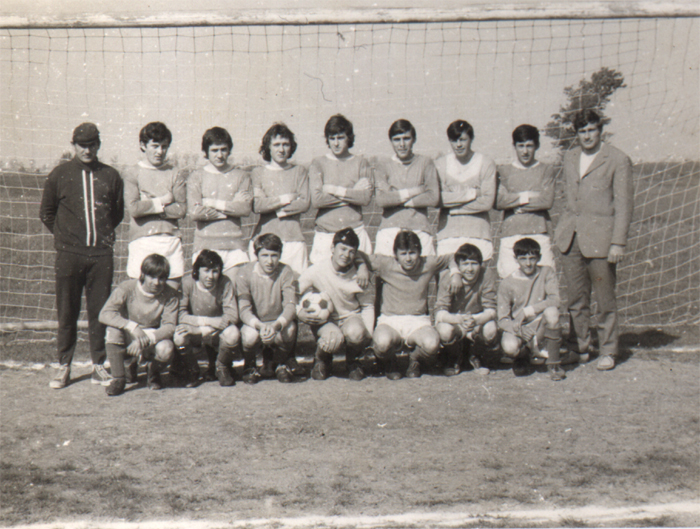
Team from 1974, youngsters

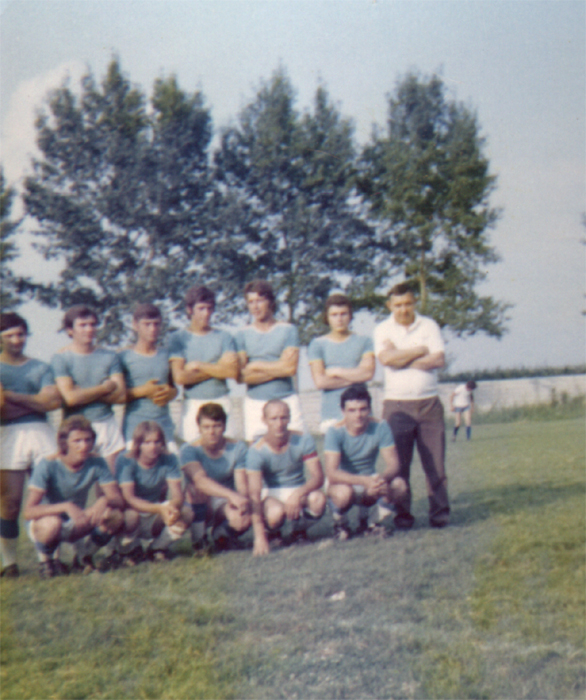
Team from 1975

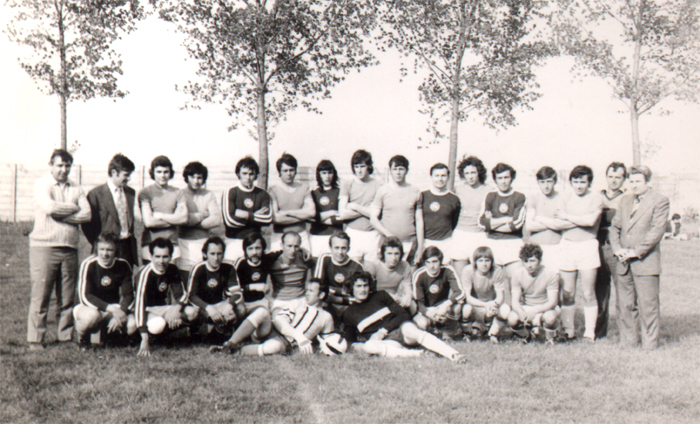
Team from 1975

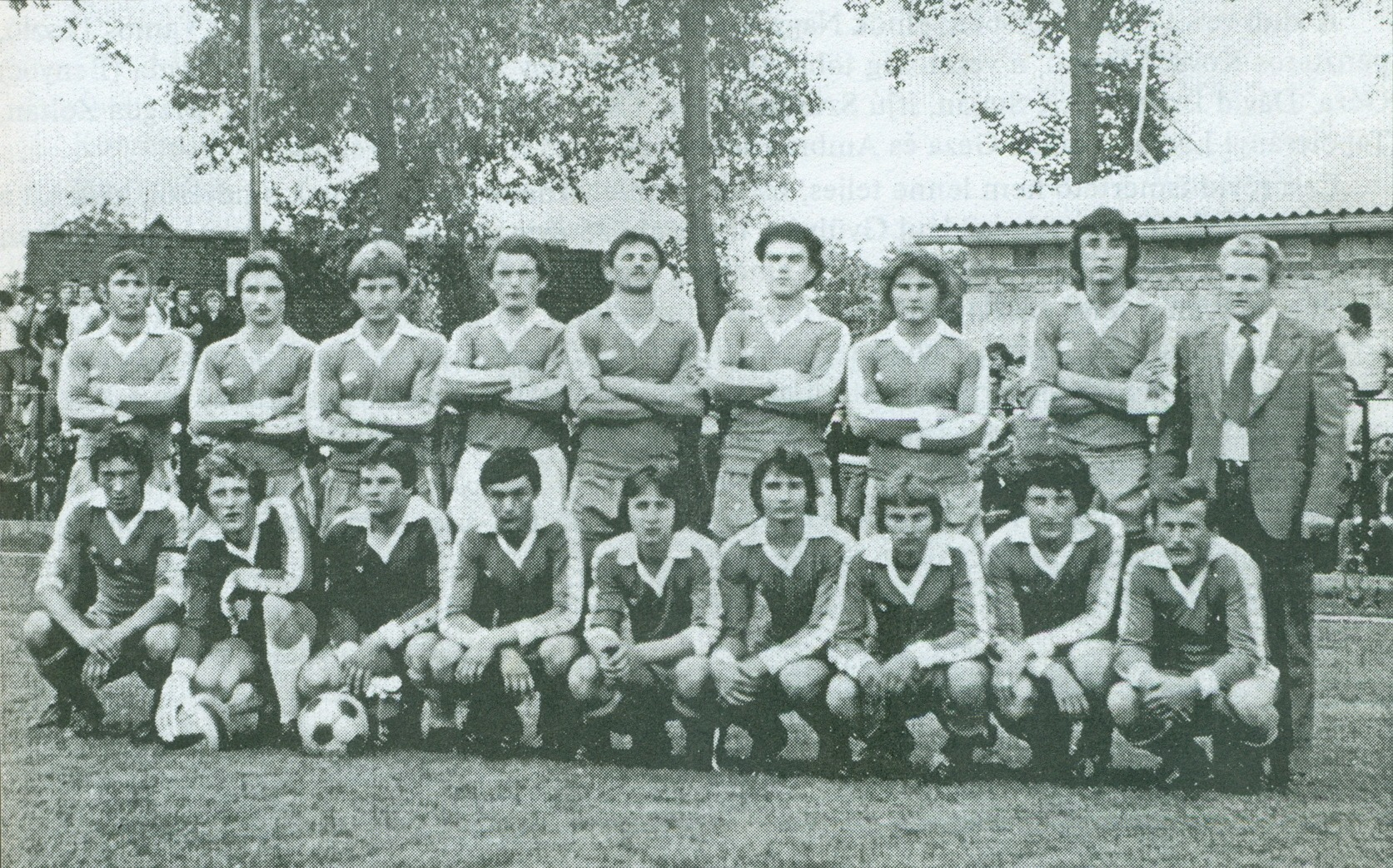
Team from 1977

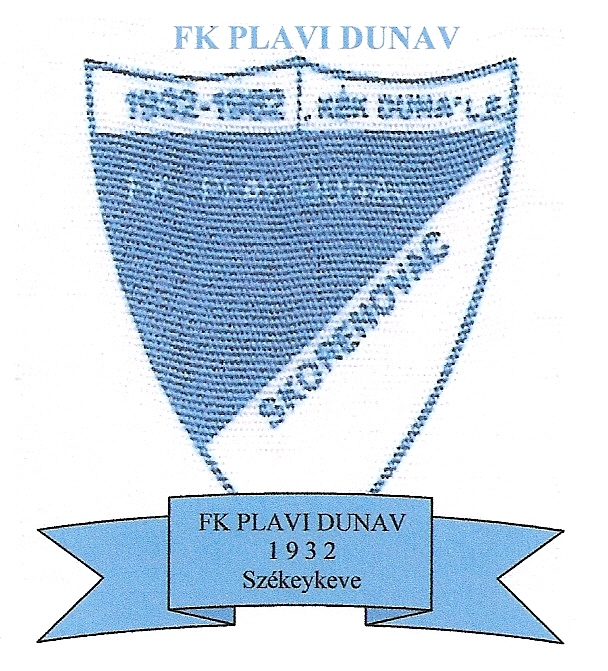
Jubilee emblem 1982

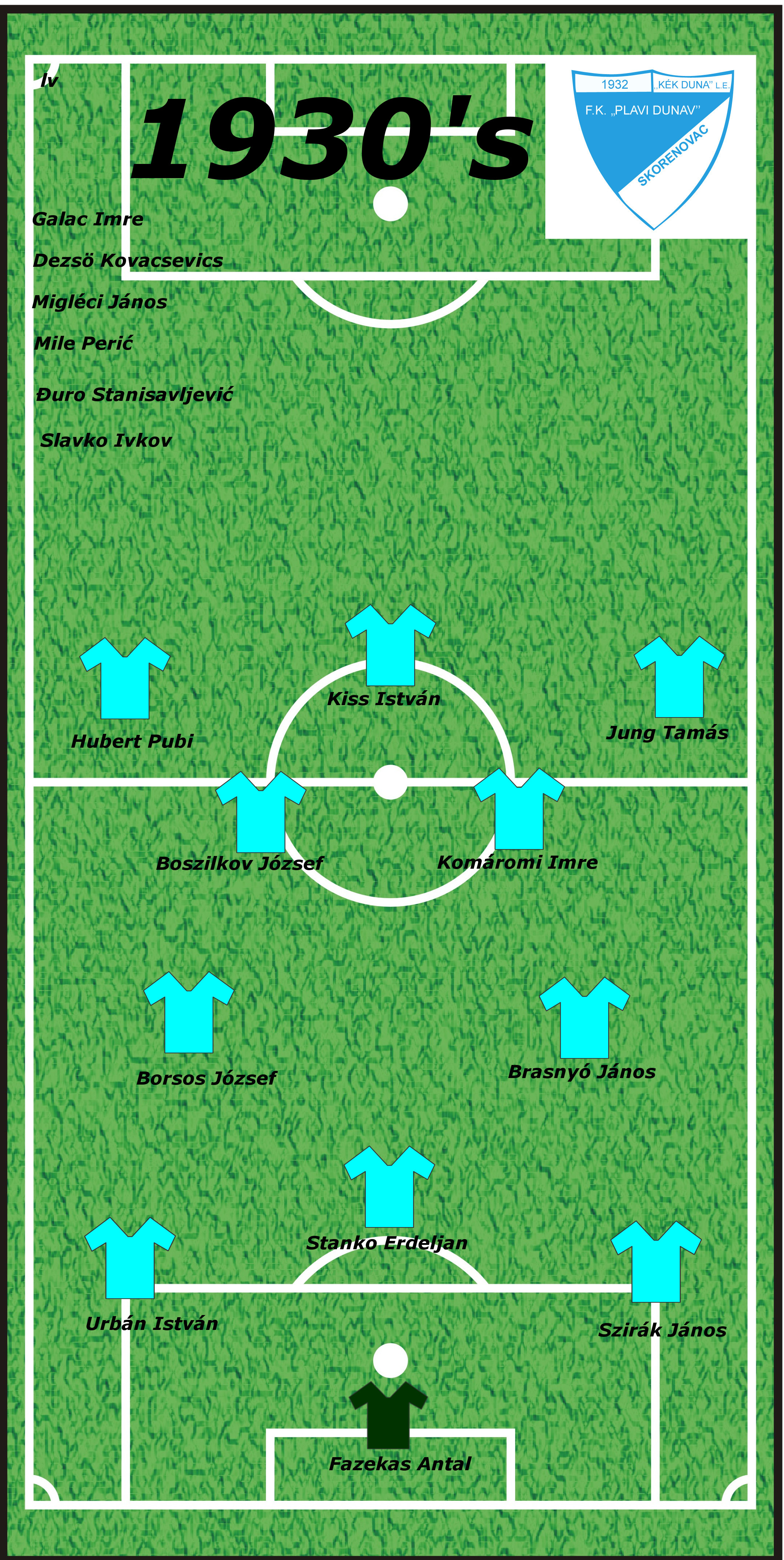
Squad members from 1930's

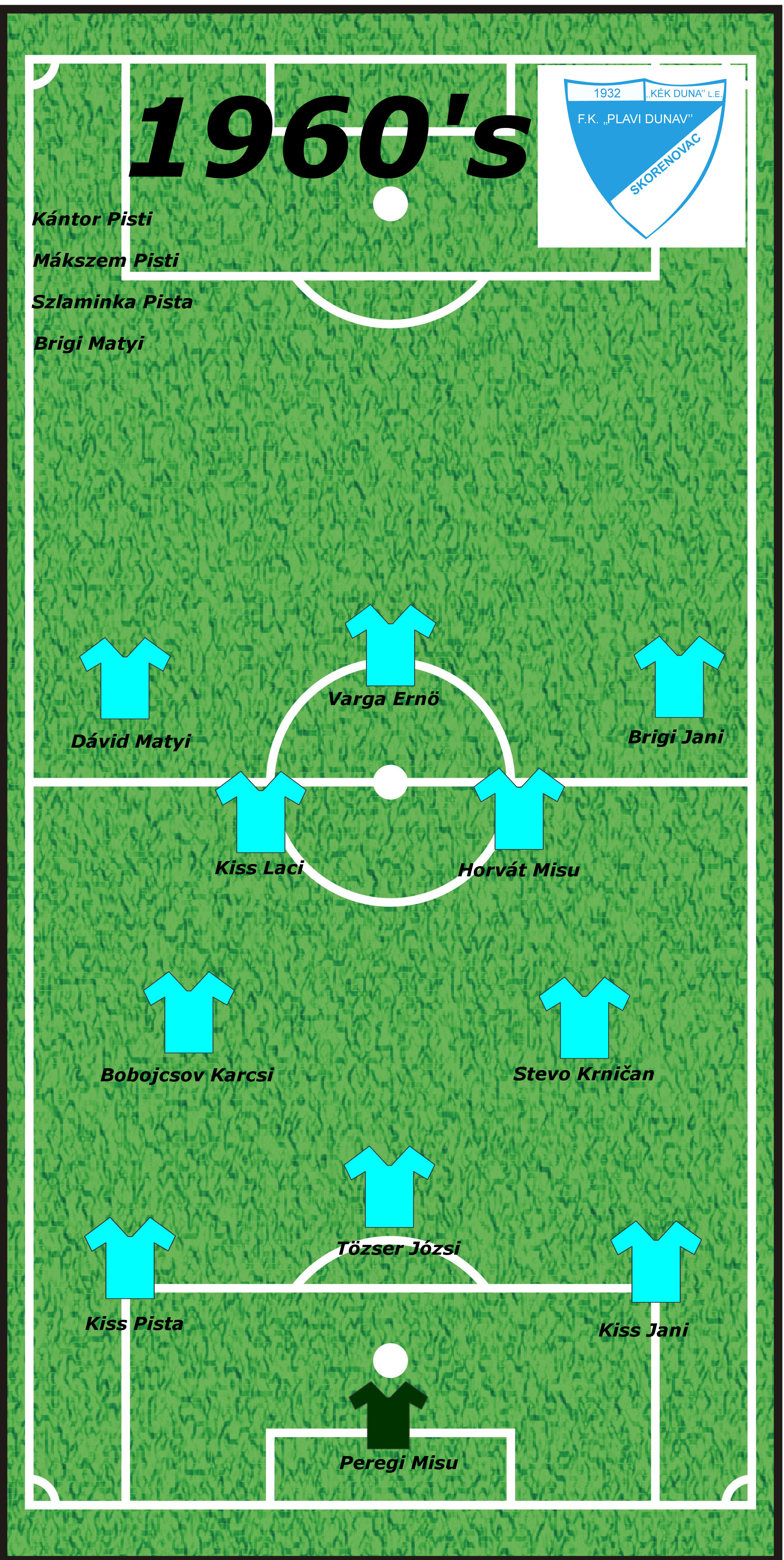
Squad members from 1960's

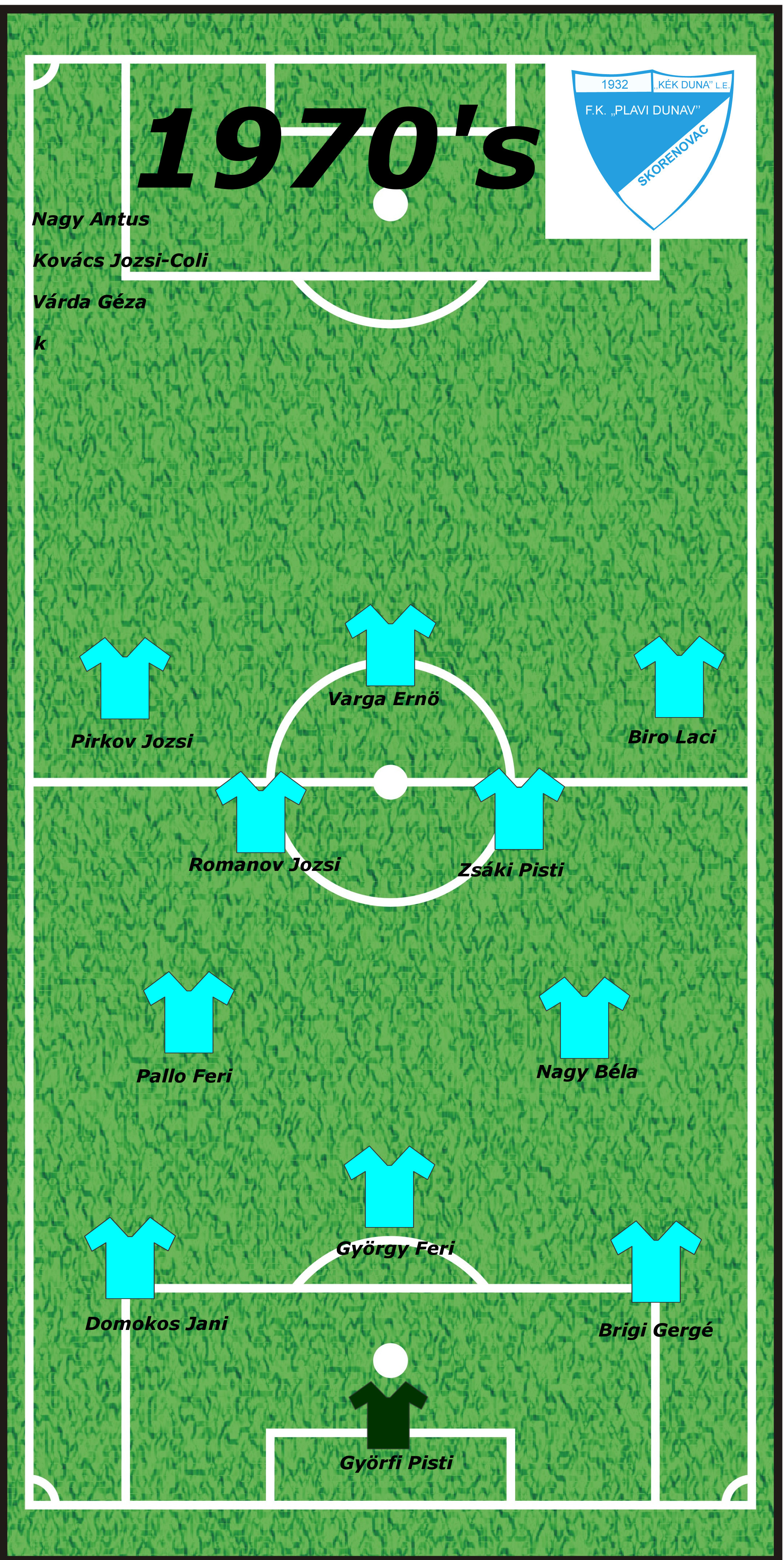
Squad members from 1970's

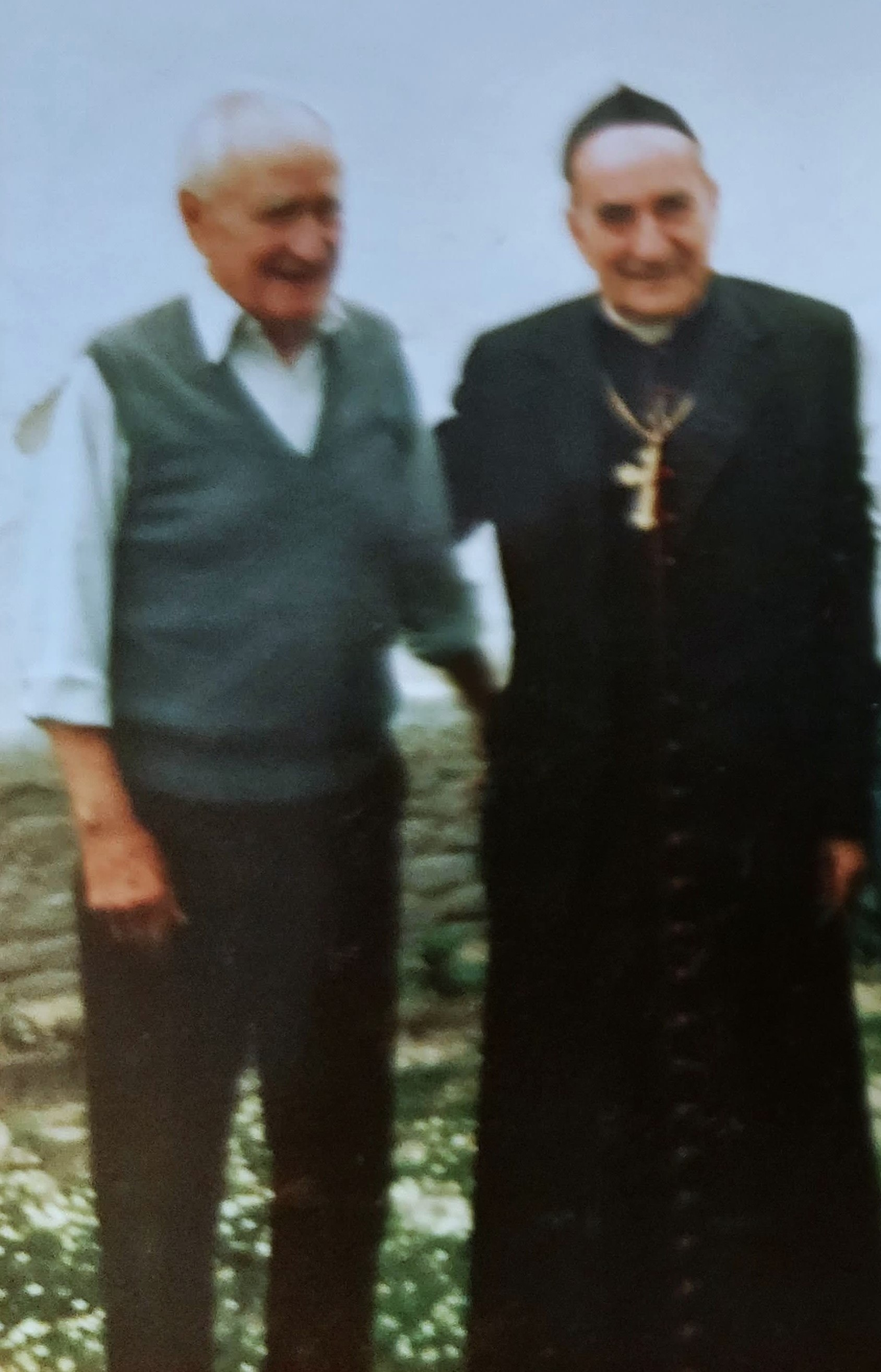
Original player Istvan Urban (l) and founder Tamas Jung (r)

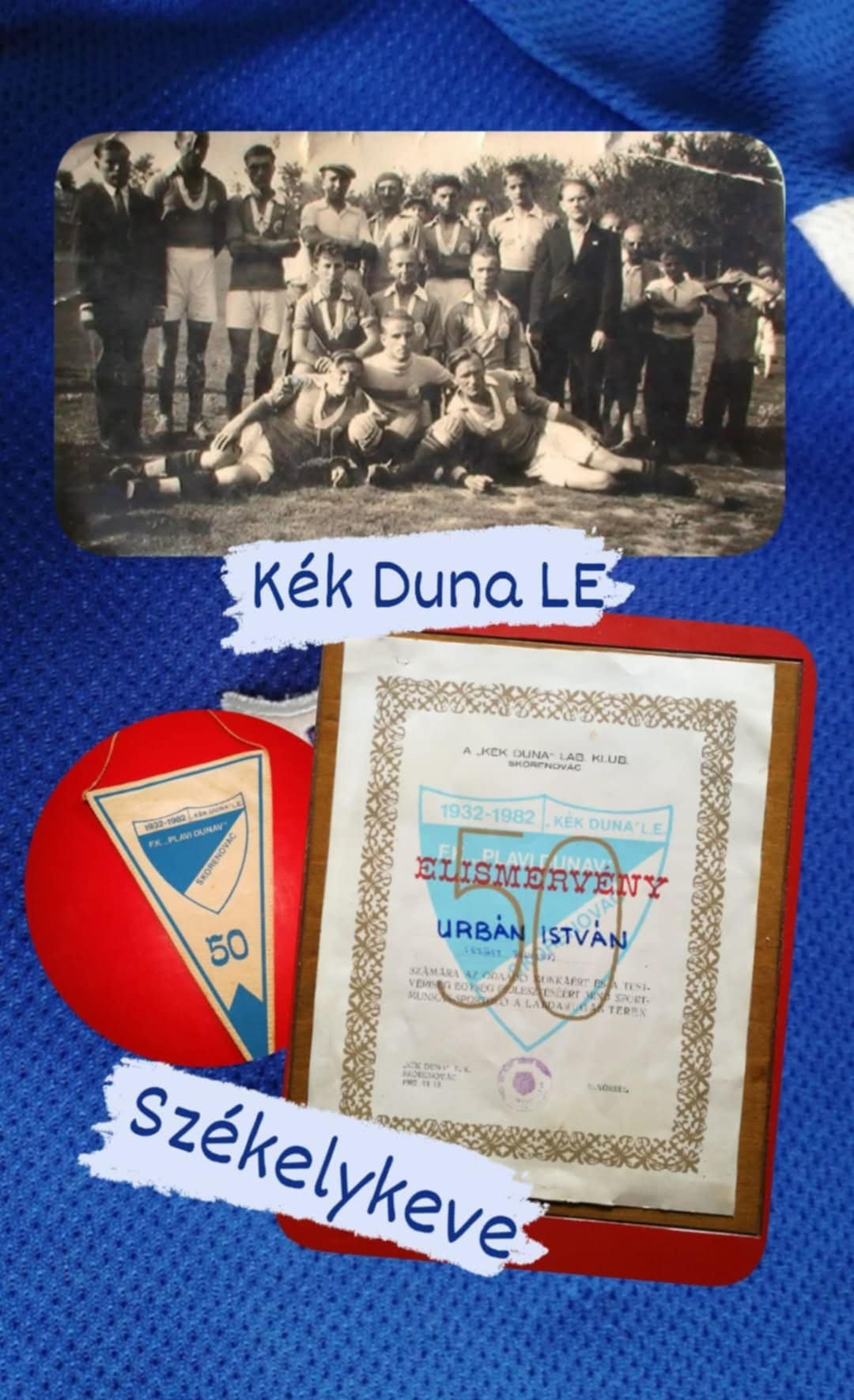
Club's 50th anniversary

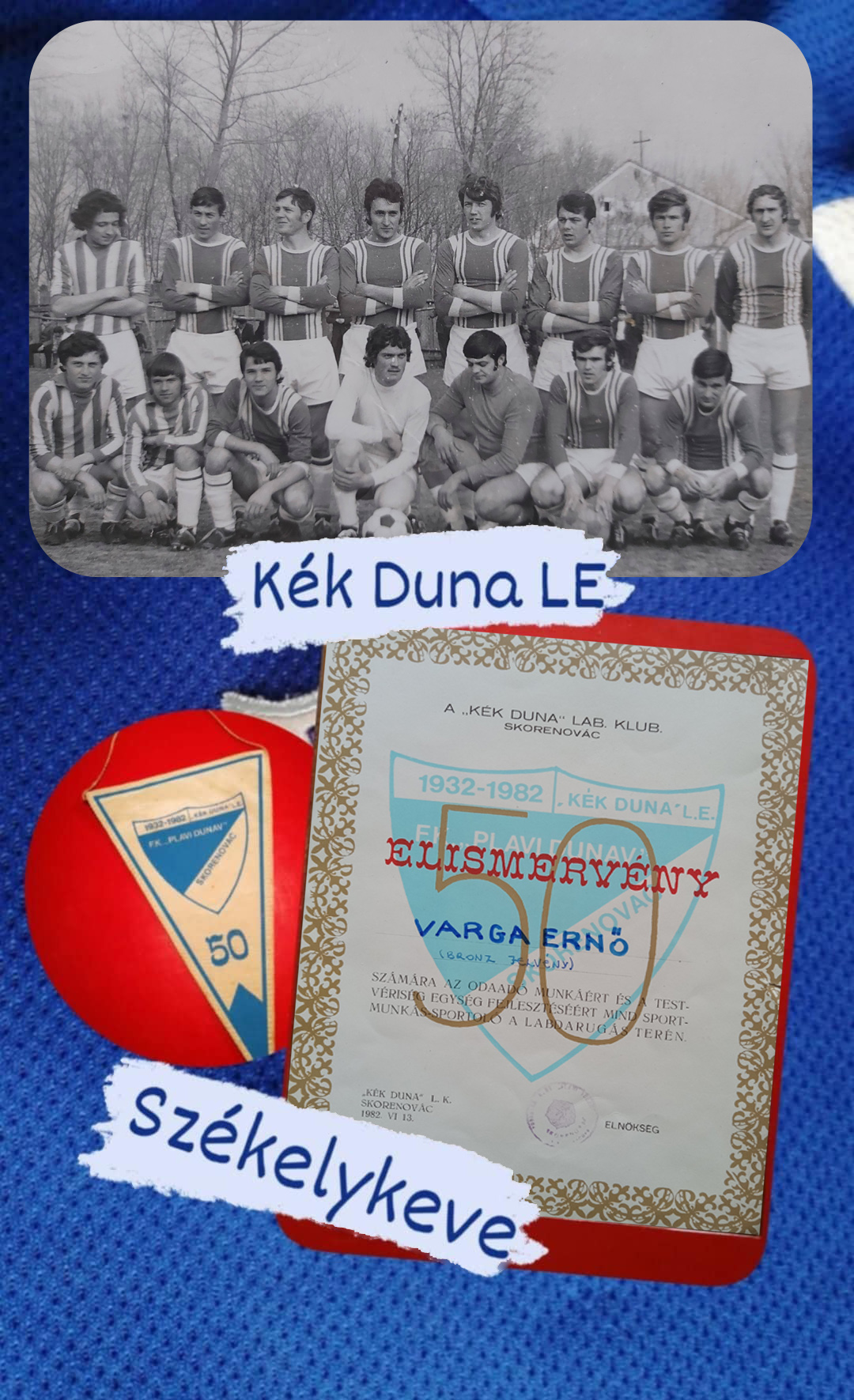
Club's 50th anniversary

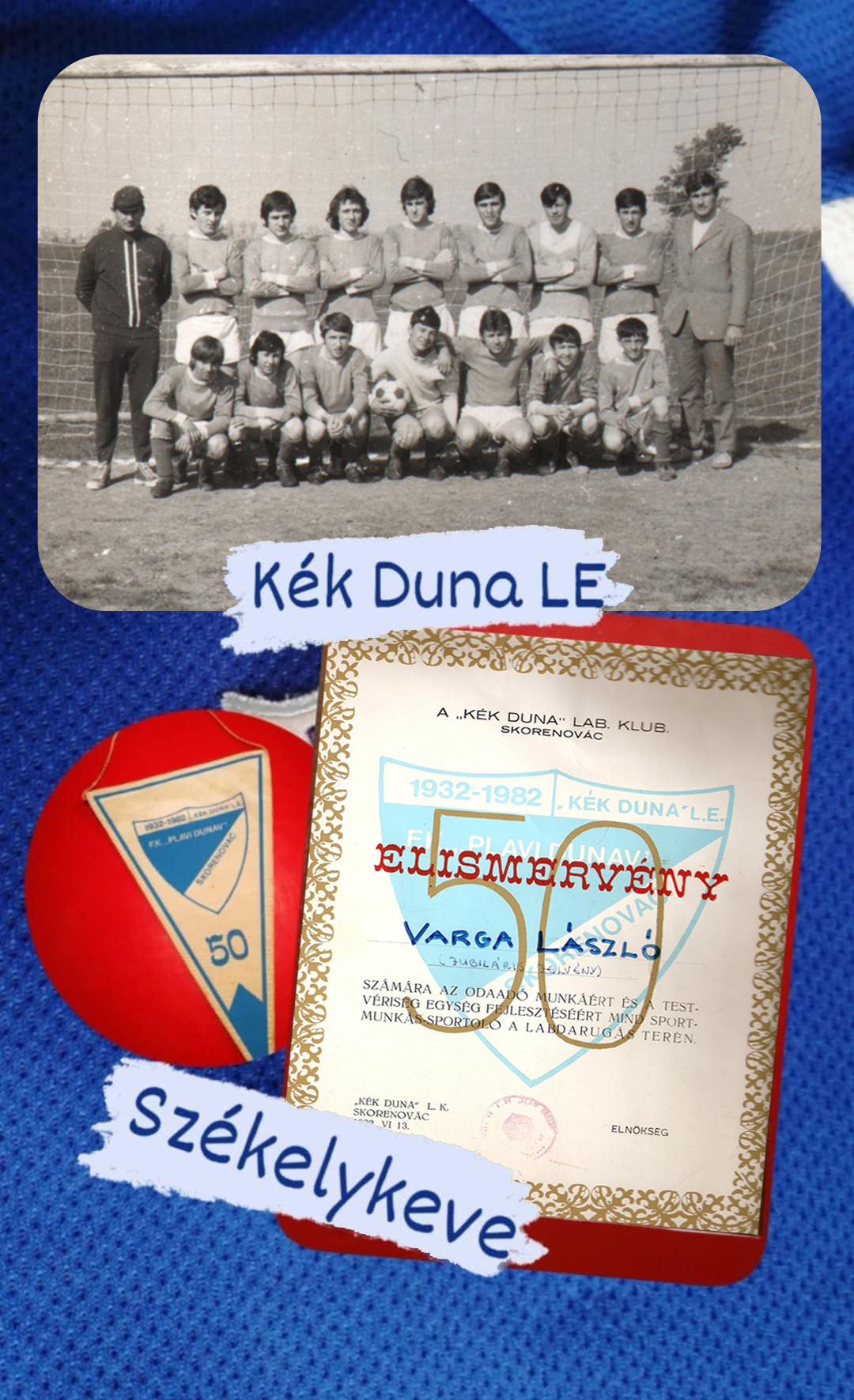
Club's 50th anniversary

== Sources ==
- Skorenovac története – Szabatka Gyula ( R. Oberläuter, Kovin 1936 )
- Székelykeve, A falu története – Galambos Tibor ( LO Press Kovin 2001 )
