= List of futsal clubs in Serbia =

== Prva futsal liga Srbije/First Futsal League of Serbia ==
=== Clubs ===
The first futsal league of Serbia currently has 12 clubs:

No.	Club Name	City
1.	Ekonomac	Kragujevac
2.	Kalca	Niš
3.	Becej	Bečej
4.	Smederevo	Smederevo
5.	SAS	Zrenjanin
6.	Kopernikus	Niš
7.	Novi Pazar	Novi Pazar
8.	Vranje	Vranje
9.	Mungosi	Belgrade
10.	Fontana	Čačak
11.	Vintersport	Niš
12.	Nova Pazova	Nova Pazova

=== Other Clubs ===
- KMF Bajina Bašta
- KMF Krčagovo - Užice
- KMF Požega
- KMF Užice
- KMF Kolorado - Gornji Milanovac
- KMF Mali Zvornik
- KMF Zlatiborac - Čajetina
- KMF Župski Rubin
- KMF Raška
- KMF Partenon - Smederevska Palanka
- KMF Mašinac - Kragujevac
- KMF Ekonomac 2 - Kragujevac
- KMF Ivanjica
- KMF Aranđelovac
- KMF RB 014 - Valjevo
- KMF Kragujevac
- KMF Niš 92
- KMF Pirot
- KMF Timok
- KMF AS - Bujanovac
- KMF Prokuplje
- KMF Bor
- KMF Akademac - Niš
- KMF Dolap - Prokuplje
- KMF Deus Futsal - Mitrovica
- KMF Leteći Holanđanin - Vrbas, Serbia
- KMF Forum - Vršac
- KMF Tvrđava - Novi Sad
- KMF Hajduk - Kula, Serbia
- KMF Tango Liman - Novi Sad
- KMF Viking - Ruma
- KMF Srbobran
- KMF Kikinda
- KMF Šampion - Subotica
- KMF Slodes
- KMF Foto Klik Fleš
- KMF Ekonomist - Belgrade
- KMF TMF
- KMF Intelektualac - Belgrade
- KMF Kolubara
- KMF Radnički
- KMF Radec
- KMF Kareli - Ub, Serbia
- KMF Kosjerić
- KMF Dela Tores - Šabac
- KMF Fleš - Valjevo
- KMF Požarevac
- KMF Olimp - Vrnjačka Banja
- KMF 92 - Užice
- KMF Orao Čaršija - Arilje
- KMF Karanovac - Kraljevo
- KMF Timok 2013-2 - Zaječar
- KMF Banjica - Bela Palanka
- KMF Jastrebac - Niš
- KMF BSK - Bujanovac
- KMF Ekonmist - Niš
- KMF Burbusovac - Knjaževac
- KMF Zufo - Bujanovac
- KMF Rota - Bujanovac
- KMF Babušnica 2011
- KMF Telep - Novi Sad
- KMF Apa Futsal - Apatin
- KMF Kraljevićevo - Kačarevo
- KMF TPK - Temerin
- KMF Kruna - Novi Sad
- KMF Sombor
- KMF BSK - Bački Brestovac
- KMF Seničani Aranđelovac
- KMF Bačka - Bačka Palanka
- KMF Kepa 9 - Stajićevo
- KMF Bezbednost 192 Valjevo
