= FK AFK Ada =

AFK Ada
- Full name: Fudbalski Klub AFK Ada
- Founded: 1912; 114 years ago
- Ground: Gradski stadion, Ada
- Capacity: 700
- League: PFL Subotica
- 2024-25: PFL Subotica, 7th
Home colours

FK AFK Ada (Serbian Cyrillic: ФК AФК Aдa) is a football club based in Ada, Serbia.

As of the 2025/26 season, they play in the 5th tier-PFL Subotica.

== History ==
The club was founded in 1912. The last played in the Serbian 4th tier in the 2012/13 season.

== Recent league history ==
Season	Division	P	W	D	L	F	A	Pts	Pos
2021–22	5 - PFL Subotica	30	16	4	10	63	44	52	5th
2022–23	5 - PFL Subotica	28	13	5	10	65	43	44	7th
2023–24	5 - PFL Subotica	30	14	3	13	47	65	45	7th
2024–25	5 - PFL Subotica	30	14	2	14	58	57	44	7th
