= Pap (surname) =

Pap is a Hungarian noble surname. Notable people with the surname include:

- Arthur Pap (1921-1959), Swiss philosopher
- Béla Pap (1845-1916), Hungarian lieutenant general and Minister of Defence
- Bianka Pap (born 2000), Hungarian Paralympic swimmer
- Eduard Pap (born 1994), Romanian football goalkeeper
- Endre Pap (born 1947), Hungarian mathematician
- Eszter Pap (born 1993), Hungarian triathlete
- Géza Pap (1883-1912), Hungarian painter
- Gyula Pap (1813–1870), Hungarian ethnographer and writer of Hungarian folk tales
- János Pap (1925–1994), Hungarian politician
- Jenő Pap (born 1951), Hungarian fencer, 1982 world individual épée champion
- Károly Pap (1897-1945), Jewish Hungarian writer
- Kornélia Pap, Hungarian rower
- Lajos Pap (1883-1941), discredited Hungarian spiritualist medium
- Norbert Pap (born 1969), Hungarian geographer–historian
- Róbert Pap (1874–1947), Hungarian Jewish lawyer
- Roland Pap (born 1990), Hungarian footballer
- Vera Pap (1956-2015), Hungarian actress

== See also ==
- Papp, a Hungarian surname
