= Skorenovac =

Skorenovac Скореновац Székelykeve
- Village (Selo)
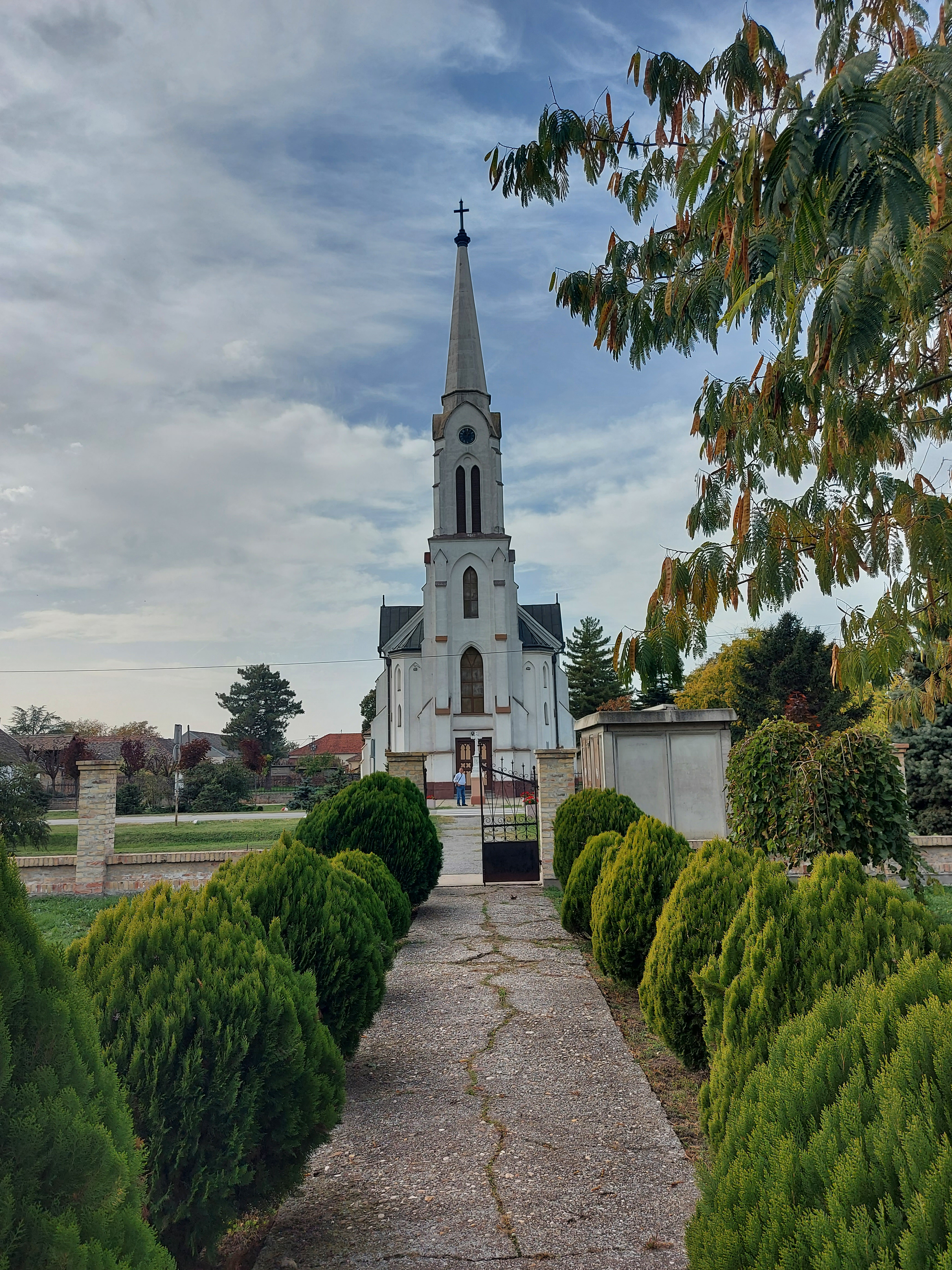
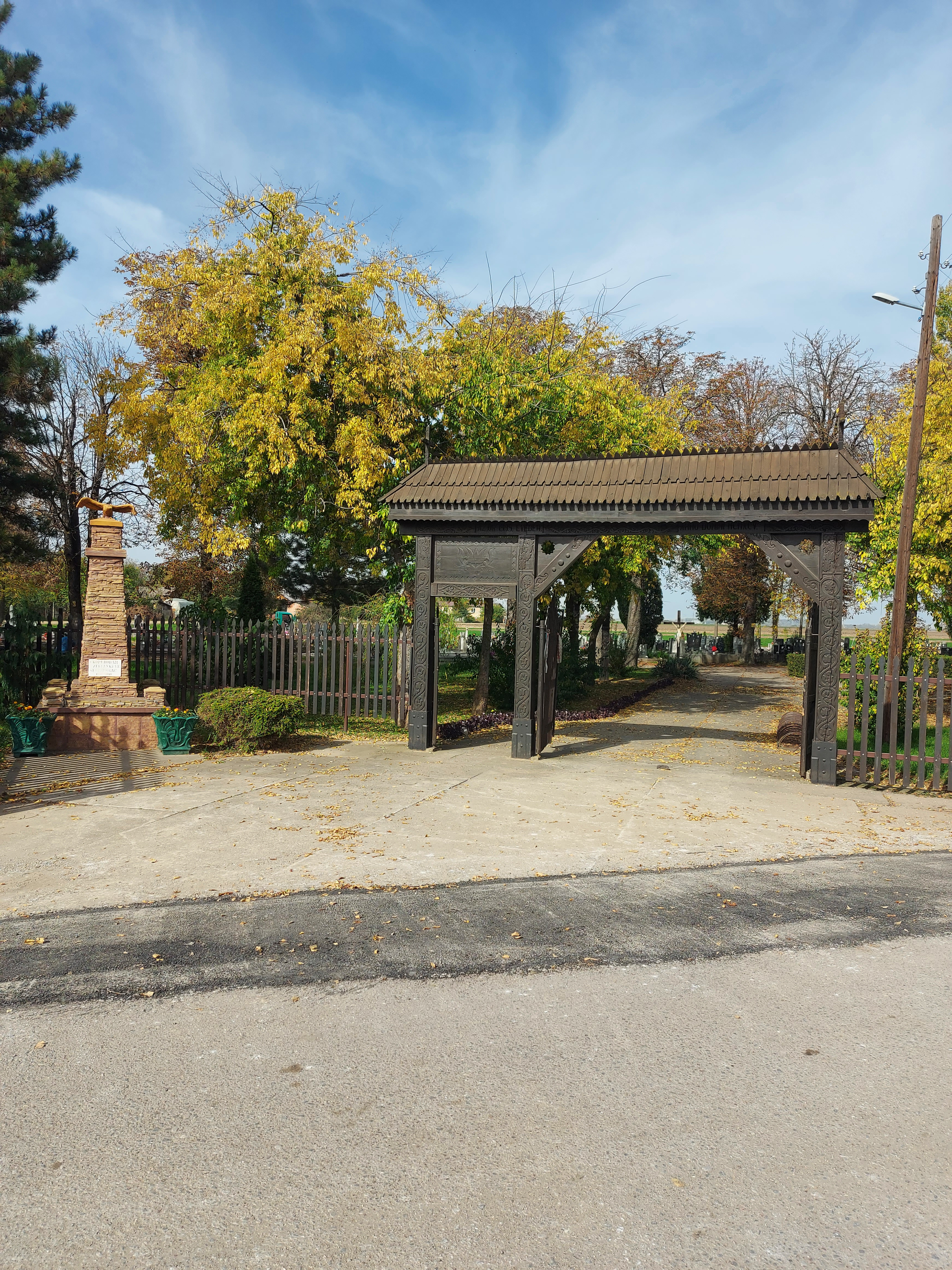
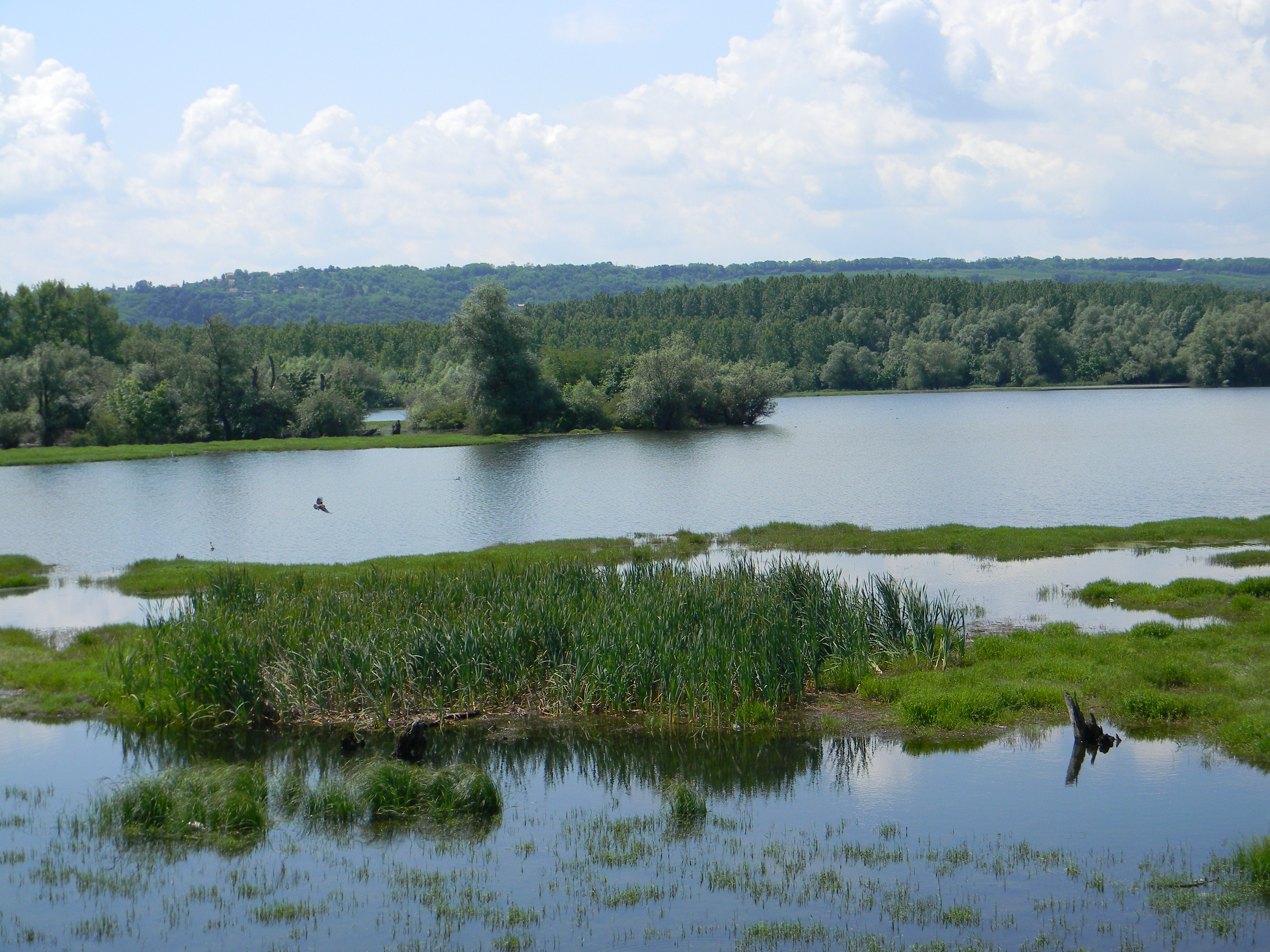
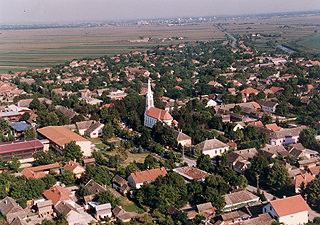
- From top left: Catholic church, Monument Turul bird, Gap (Szakado), Bird view of Skorenovac Skorenovac

- Location of Skorenovac within Serbia Skorenovac (Serbia) Skorenovac (Europe)
- Coordinates: 44°45′32″N 20°54′10″E
- Country: Serbia
- Province: Vojvodina
- District: South Banat
- Municipality: Kovin
- Elevation: 73 m (240 ft)

Population (2002)
  - Skorenovac: 2,574
- Time zone: UTC+1 (CET)
  - Summer (DST): UTC+2 (CEST)
- Postal code: 26228
- Area code: +381(0)13
- Car plates: KO

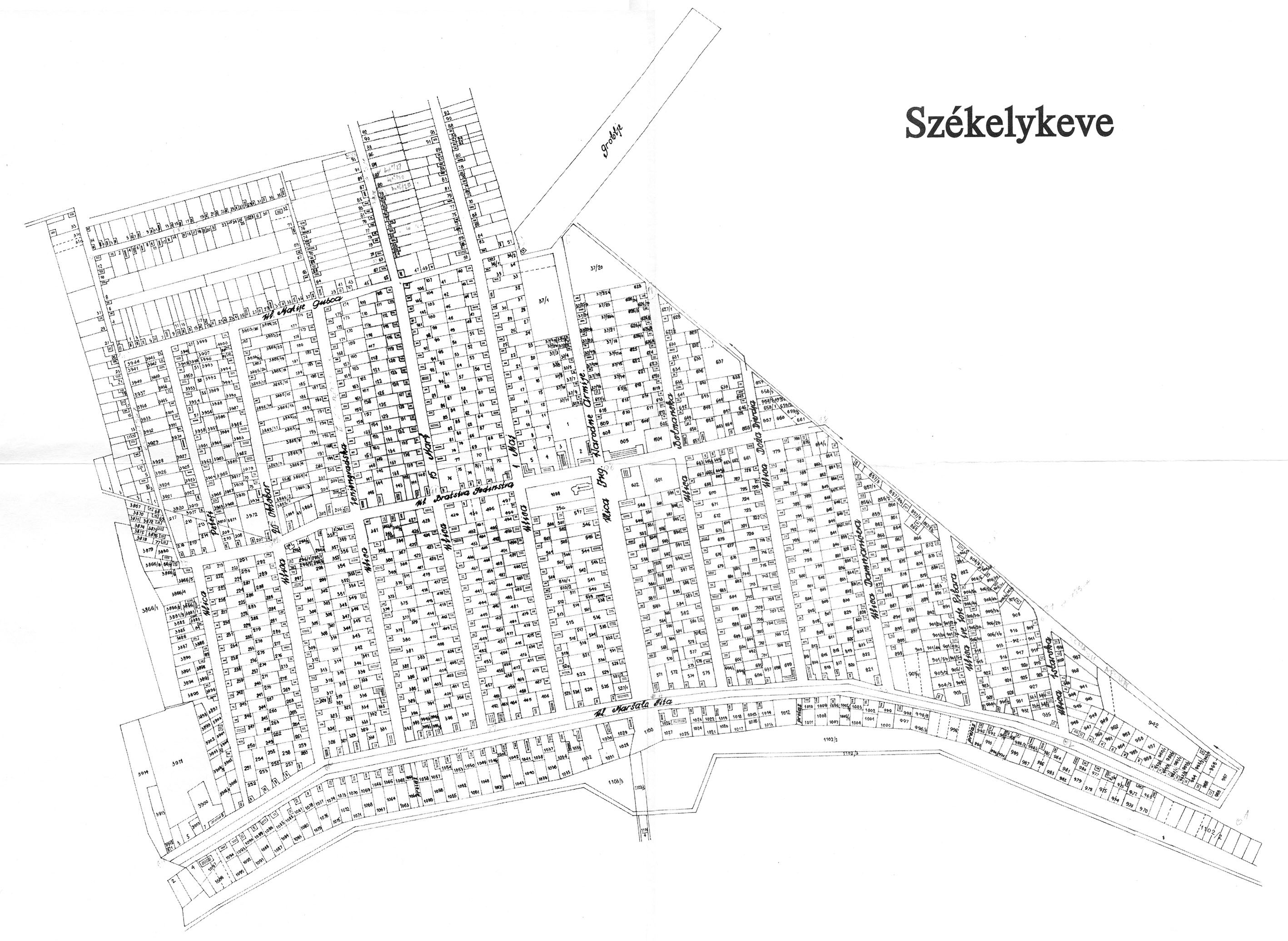
Skorenovac map

Skorenovac (Serbian: Скореновац; Hungarian: Székelykeve; German: Skorenowatz; Banat Bulgarian: Gjurgevo) is a village located in the Kovin municipality, in the South Banat District of Serbia, in the Autonomous Province of Vojvodina. The village has a Hungarian ethnic majority (86.71%) and a population of 2,574 (2002 census).

== Geography ==
The closest towns are Kovin (6 km), Smederevo (17 km), Pančevo (30 km), and Belgrade (46 km).

== History ==
=== General history ===
The village named Gyurgyova-Rádayfalva (Đurđevo) existed between 1869 and 1886 at the location between Banatski Brestovac and Danube river. In 1869, the population of Gyurgyova numbered 396 people, later, 1880 census, the population number drop to 298 people. After initial settlement, which included Hungarian (Palóc) families from Banatsko Novo Selo (hun: Újfalu), Jermenovci (hun: Ürményháza), Sándorfalva, Szeged county and Banatski Dušanovac (hun: Szőlősudvarnok, ger: Rogendorf), in 1883 came the first Székely settlement with total of 645 families or around 2,000 individuals. The village was then known as Nagygyörgyfalva (1883–1886).

Later, in 1886, the population of the village was resettled to the location of present-day Skorenovac and Ivanovo. The reason for resettlement to Skorenovac and Ivanovo was the flooding of the Danube river and the yearly annihilation of property in the village and its agricultural land. At the same time, the inhabitants' lives were in constant danger.

The village of Skorenovac (named Székelykeve 1886–1922) was founded in 1886, during the time of Franz Joseph I. In the time of the village settlement, its territory was situated in the Torontál Vármegye (County) of the Kingdom of Hungary. In 1888 it had 506 houses and in 1910 the village had 685 houses. In 1912 it was situated in the Temes Vármegye (County). From 1922, the village is known as Skorenovac, from German Skorenowatz.

The majority of the original settlers were Székely Hungarians who came from Bukovina, and also, in the same time frame, some German families from Plandište and Pločice and some Bulgarian families from Dudeștii Vechi (hun: Óbesenyő, ger: Altbeschenowa, Banat Bulgarian: Stár Bišnov) are settled in Skorenovac. Skorenovac is the southernmost village in Europe with a Hungarian majority.

=== Economy, religion, and education ===
- 1885 - The first steady teacher came to the village of Gyurgyova (then in 1886 to Skorenovac). His name was János Mischel.
- 1886 - The first judge and mayor of Skorenovac was Ágoston Kollár (1886–1890).
- 1889 - The school building was finished. The teachers in the school were: Johan Steiner (Principal and teacher), János Mischel (teacher), Ottilia Müller (teacher), and Etelka Somogyi (teacher). In school year 1905/1906 school had 561 students. Elementary school, in that time, was up to grade 6. School Board members in 1930's were Imre László, Mihály Fehér, Francz Wintergerst, Bóna Boszilkov, József Medgyessy and András Varga.
- 1892 - December 18, a Church (Roman Catholic) was erected. The first priest was Ferenc Deleme (1892–1898).
- 1894 - November 25, foundation of the Farmers Creditors Collective. Its president was Fr. Ferenc Deleme, and the collective had 71 members.
- 1895 - October 6, Library was founded, and had a 50 members. President was Ferenc Deleme, while the librarian was János Hajagos.
- 1898 - The first "shared" doctor in the village, Dr. József Klein.
- 1899 - The voluntary fire brigade was established; its president was Johan Kirchgäsner and the fire chief was Johan Mischel, while the brigade had 60 members.
- 1900 - The first permanent doctor, Dr. Edét Urbanek, arrived in the village.
- 1906 - Hunters association founded, with 14 members. Founders were Gyula Szabatka and Dezsö Töry.
- 1912 - The first motorized "Big Mill" is opened, owned by Katalin Rüger. It worked until the mid-1970s, when it was closed.
- 1913 - April 27, "Hangya" Collective of Consumer Association is established. President was Aladár Wikel, and the association had 128 members. A merchandise store was opened the same year.
- 1924 - The Red Cross started humanitarian work, but the official establishment of the organization was in 1931. The organization had 57 members, while the president was Dr. Imre László.
- 1925 - The Culture Association (hun: Kultúrszövetség, ger: Kulturbund) was founded. Since 1948, it is known as KUD "Petõfi Sándor".
- 1932 - Craftsman Association is established with András Bircsák, shoemaker, as president.
- 1932 - June 14, FK Plavi Dunav was founded

== Population and major ethnic groups ==
Percent of population by ethnic groups, by selected years
Year	Total pop.	Ethnic group	Percent of pop.
1910	4,541	Hungarians	73.31%
1910	4,541	Germans	11.94%
1910	4,541	Bulgarians	9.69%
1910	4,541	Slovaks	2.53%
1910	4,541	Serbs	1.26%
1921	4,195		
1921	4,195	Hungarians	81.83%
1921	4,195	Bulgarians	10.27%
1921	4,195	Germans	7.34%
1921	4,195	Serbs	0.36%
1921	4,195	Slovaks	0.05%
1948	4,465		
1948	4,465	Hungarians	84.46%
1948	4,465	Bulgarians	11.22%
1948	4,465	Serbs	3.18%
1948	4,465	Germans	0.70%
1948	4,465	Slovaks	0.05%
1991	3,213		
1991	3,213	Hungarians	80.36%
1991	3,213	Serbs	9.40%
1991	3,213	Yugoslavs	3.36%
1991	3,213	Bulgarians	2.53%
1991	3,213	Germans	0.15%
2002	2,501		
2002	2,501	Hungarians	86.71%
2002	2,501	Serbs	5.47%
2002	2,501	Bulgarians	2.99%
2002	2,501	Yugoslavs	1.04%
2002	2,501	Germans	0.07%

Population and number of households by selected year
Year	Population	Households
1869	396	N.D.
1875	N.D.	265
1880	298	N.D.
1900	3,399	664
1910	4,541	853
1915	4,486	N.D.
1921	4,195	847
1931	4,099	927
1936	4,366	N.D.
1939	4,271	N.D.
1942	4,464	1,020
1948	4,465	1,069
1953	4,403	1,105
1961	4,306	1,143
1971	4,021	1,119
1981	3,731	1,328
1991	3,213	1,086
2002	2,501	N.D.

Number of students by school year
School year	No. of students
1905–06	561
1911–12	613
1913–14	623
1922–23	500
1932–33	734
1940–41	538
1955–56	884
1963–63	623
1975–76	373
1985–86	308
1999–00	244
2000–01	233
2001–02	234
2002–03	236
2003–04	230
2004–05	219
2005–06	220
2006–07	214
2007–08	199
2008–09	184
2009–10	175
2010–11	154
2011–12	146

=== Ethnic structure and literacy ===
National structure and literacy of the population in 1890 and 1900
Year	Population total	Hungarians	Others (Note: It is not specified how many others, but the majority were Banat Bulgarians and Danube Germans)	Speaks Hungarian language	Reads and wrights on Hungarian language	Literacy
1890.	2.510 (Note: The number of inhabitants compared to the 1880 census increased because the Sekelys moved from frequently flooded village Djurdjevo to new founded Skorenovac in 1883 and were joined by new families from Bukovina.)	1,862	648	2,087	632	25.18%
1900.	3,349	2,625	724	3,007	1,297	38.73%

=== Chart ===
Population trend (Growth/Downtrend)

== Anthropology ==
=== Székely community ===
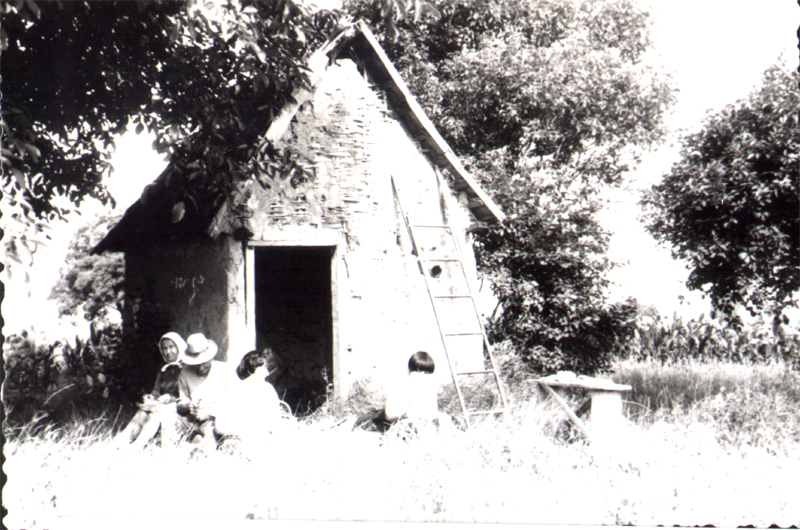
Skorenovac's Vineyard

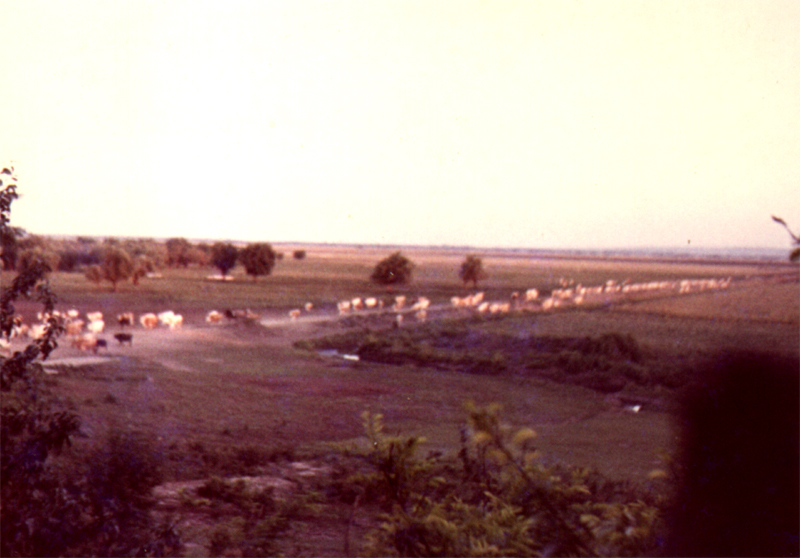
Meadow of Skorenovac

The names of the villages in Bukovina from where the Székely settlers come are (in Hungarian with their Romanian equivalents): Istensegits (rom: Tibeni), Fogadjisten (rom: Iacobești), Hadikfalva (rom: Dornești), Józseffalva (rom: Vornicenii Mici), and Andrásfalva (rom: Maneuți). These villages are today in Romania, Suceava County, Bukovina; the closest bigger places are Rădăuţi and Botoşani.

The Bukovina Székely who settled in Skorenovac, Ivanovo, and Vojlovica are originally from Madéfalva (rom: Siculeni) village in the county of Csik (Harghita), Erdély (Hungarian name of Transylvania), today in Romania. The Székelys of Bukovina in general are from the part of Erdély which is unofficially named the Székelyföld, which included Csikszék, Marosszék, Aranyosszék, Udvarhelyszék, and Háromszék counties of the historical Kingdom of Hungary.

Families, by original settlement

From Andrásfalva: Daradics, Csiszer, Erõs, Fábián, Gál, Geczõ, György, Illés, Jakab, János, Katona, Kelemen, Kemény, Kis, Koródi, Kovács, Lakatos, László, Lipina, Lukács, Müller, Palkó, Pásztor, Petres, Péter, Hompot, Husori, Sebestyén, Schidt, Szakács, Szatmári, Ranc and Varga.

From Istensegits: Ambrus, Barabás, Bartis, Béres, Bot, Borbandi, Bõte, Buzás, Dudli, Faluközi, Finnya, Fülöp, Gyõrfi, János, Kató, Lovász, Magyaros, Makrai, Miklós, Nagy, Nyistor, Pék, Sánta, Szabo, Szász, Szõte, Tamás, Urkon and Váncsa.

From Fogadjisten: Ambrus, Barabás, Gáspár, Kuruc, Papp, Váci, Szabó, and Székely.

From Hadikfalva: Beréti, Bréti, Biro, Csiki, Dani, Erdõs, Fazekas, Fodor, Forrai, Galambos, Kerekes, Kis, Kozma, Kozsán, Kölõ, and Skasszián.

From Józseffalva: Kurkó, Kusár, Palló, Mákszem, Mezei, Székely and Várda.

== Famous villagers ==
- Zoltán Dani, the ethnic Hungarian commander of a Serbian anti-aircraft battery which shot down a United States Air Force Lockheed F-117 Nighthawk stealth fighter on March 27, 1999, the only F-117 ever lost in combat.
- Zoltán Sebescen, was a German professional footballer who played as a right-back or right winger (His parents were leaved and born in Skorenovac).

== Gallery ==
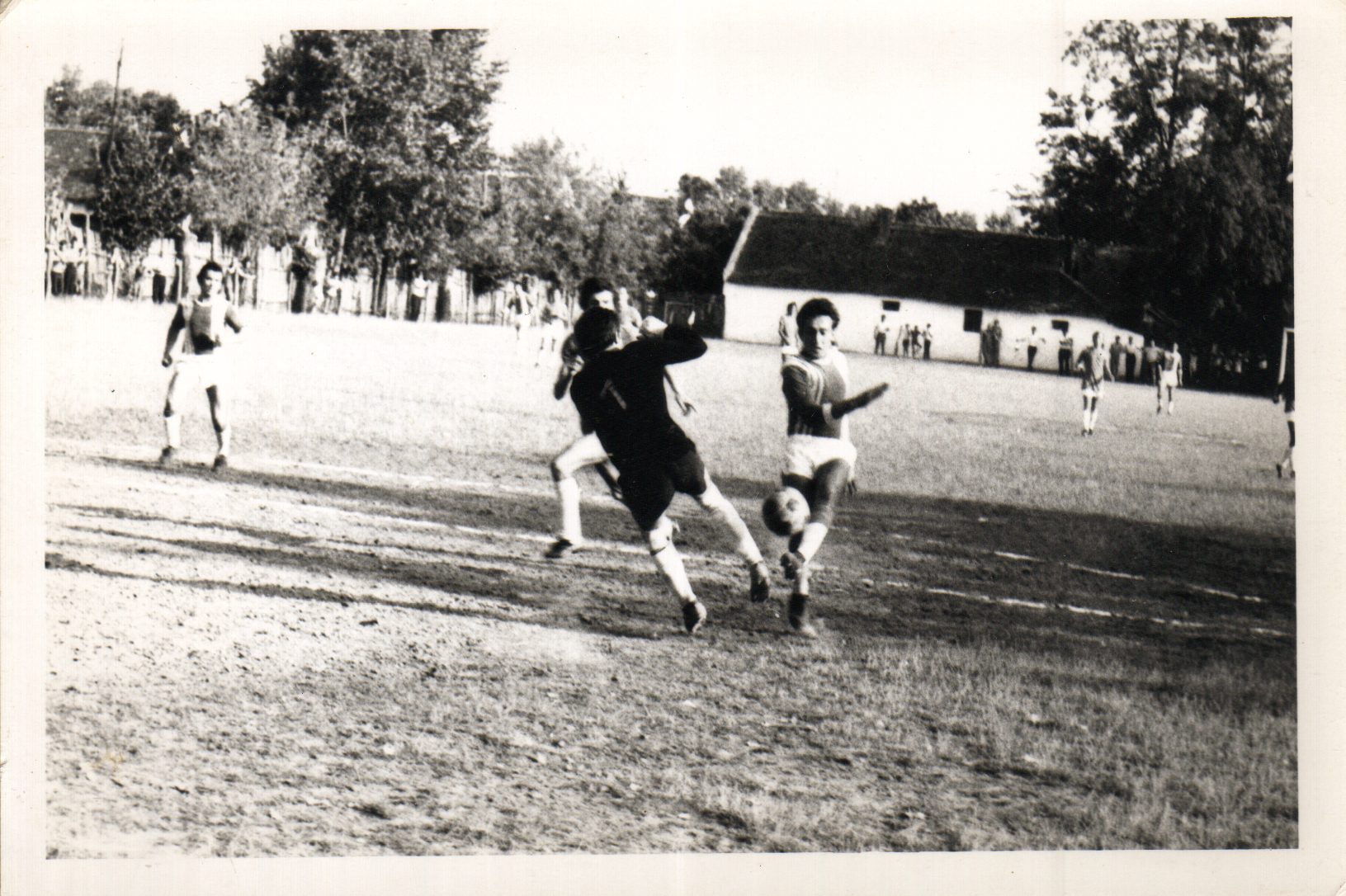
Detail from a game played on the Old Football Field in the 70's

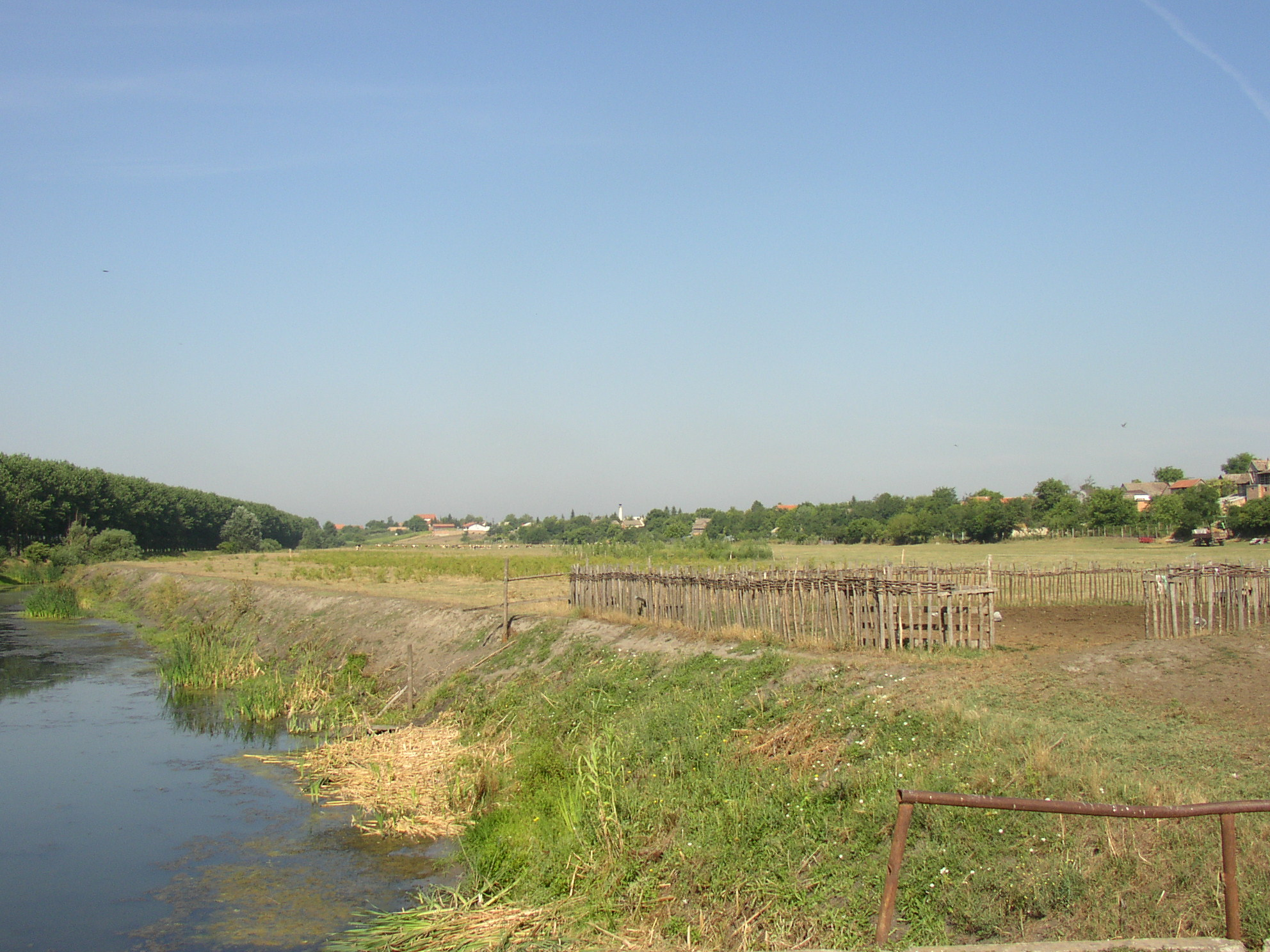
Image of Skorenovac

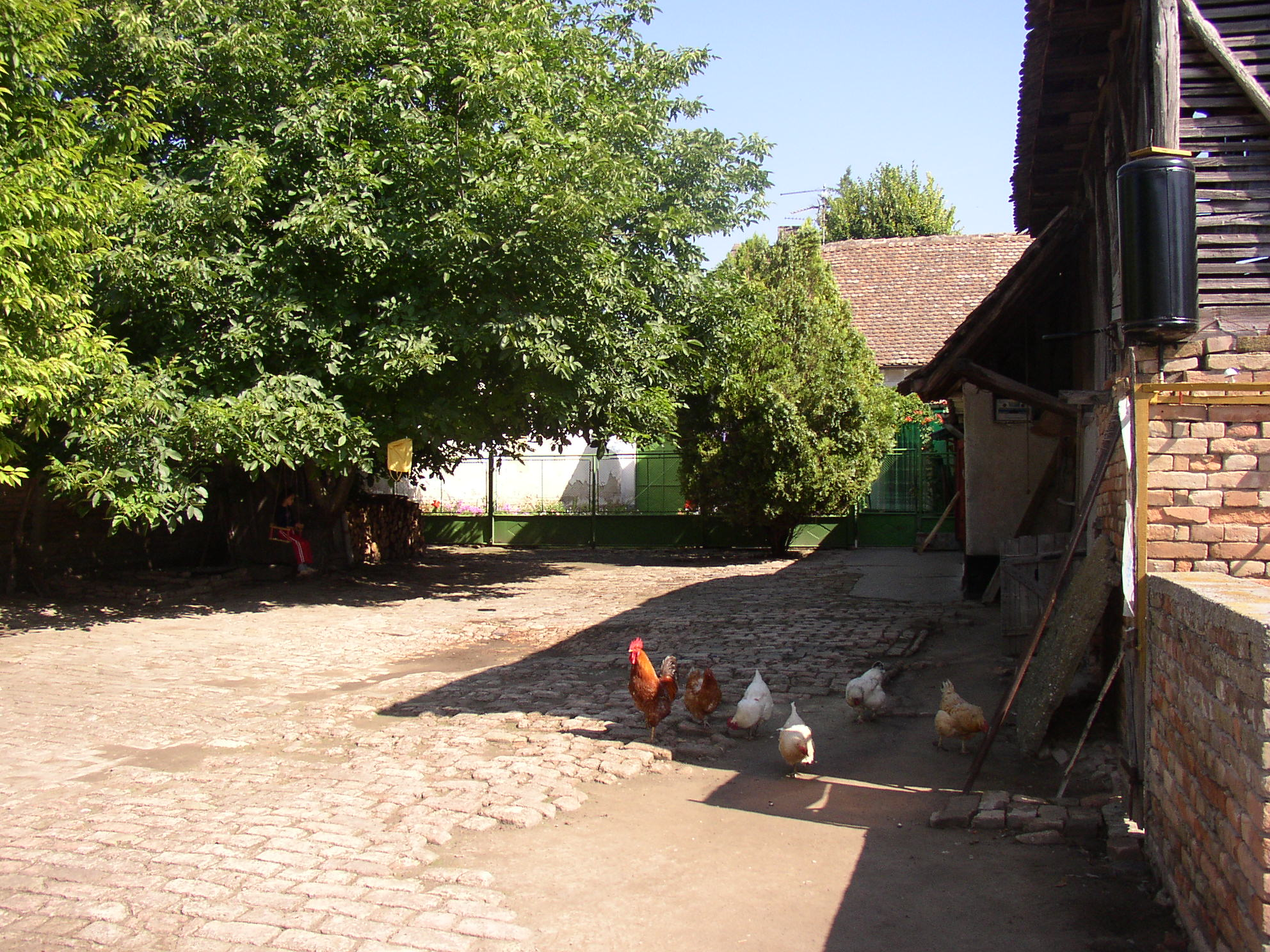
Image of Skorenovac

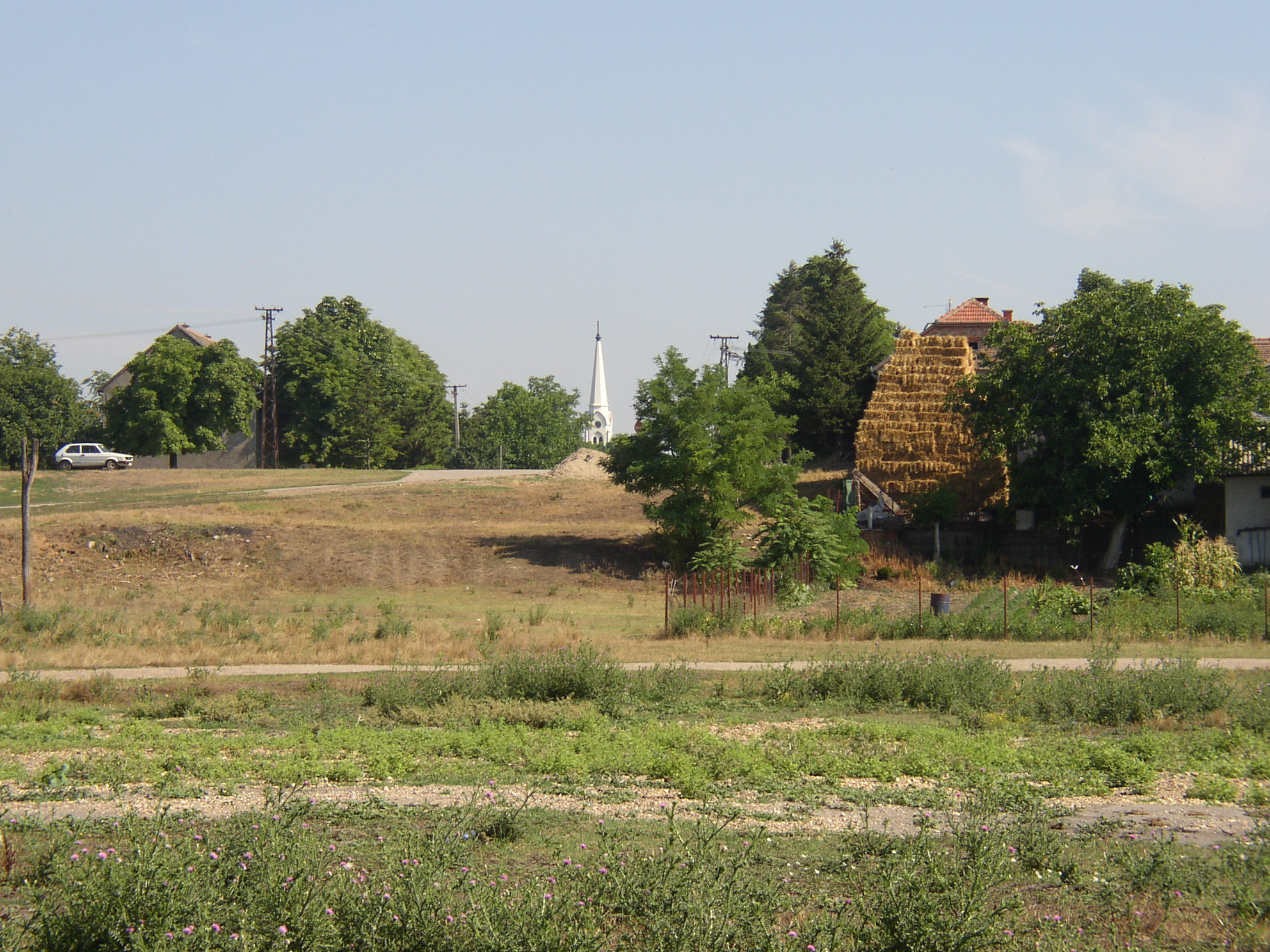
Image of Skorenovac

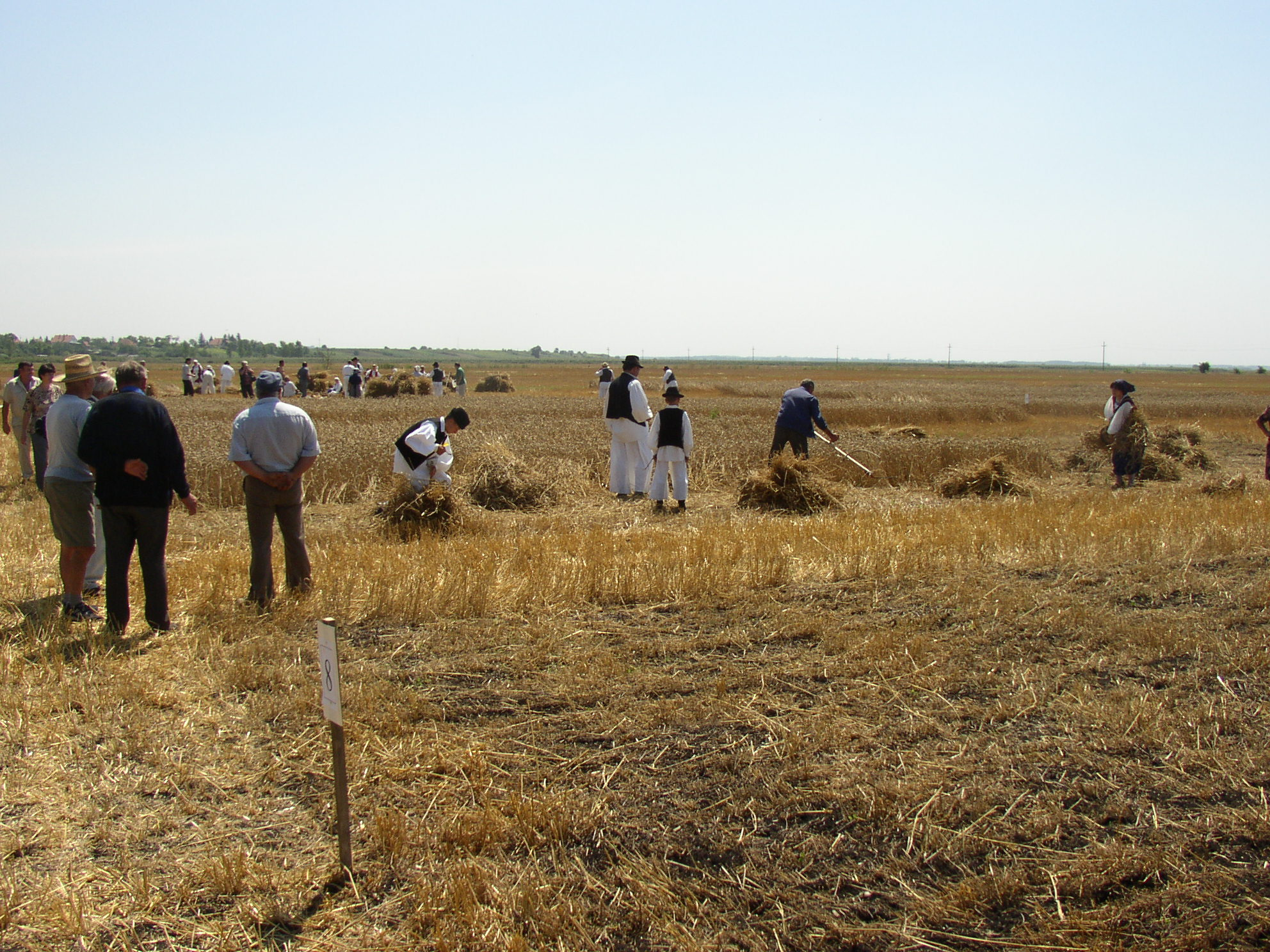
Harvest in Skorenovac

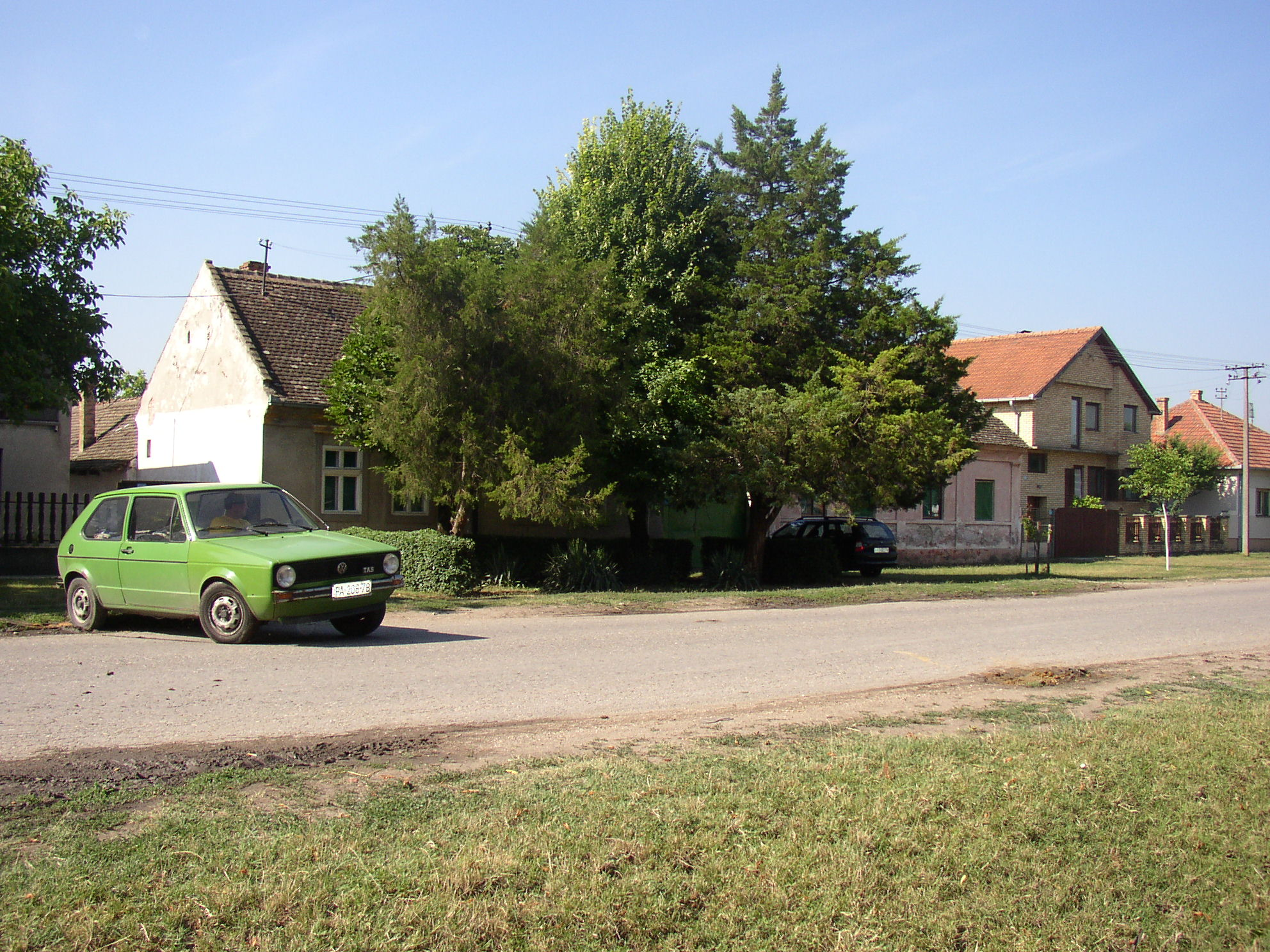
Detail from the Main Street in Skorenovac

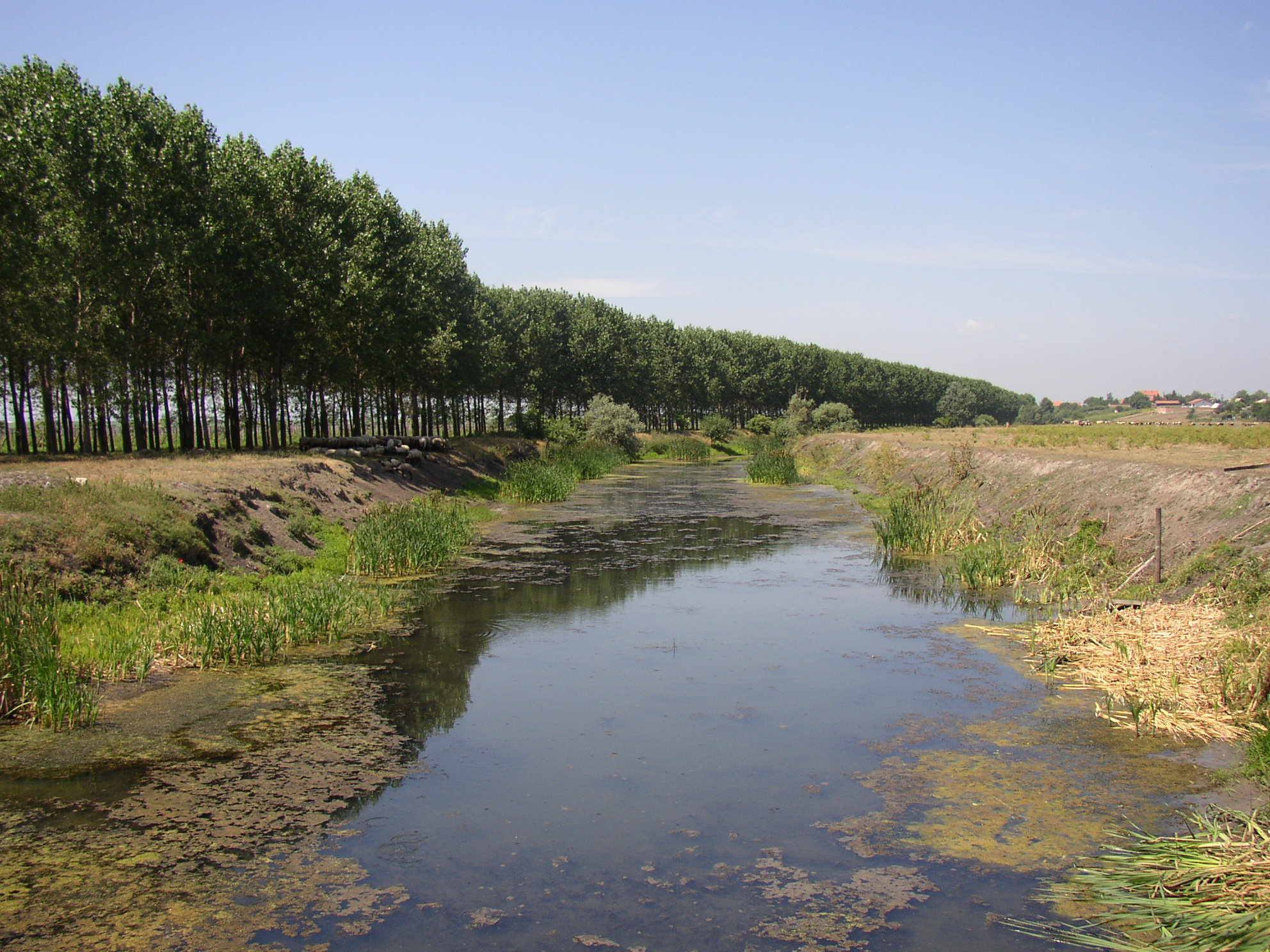
DTD Channel near Skorenovac

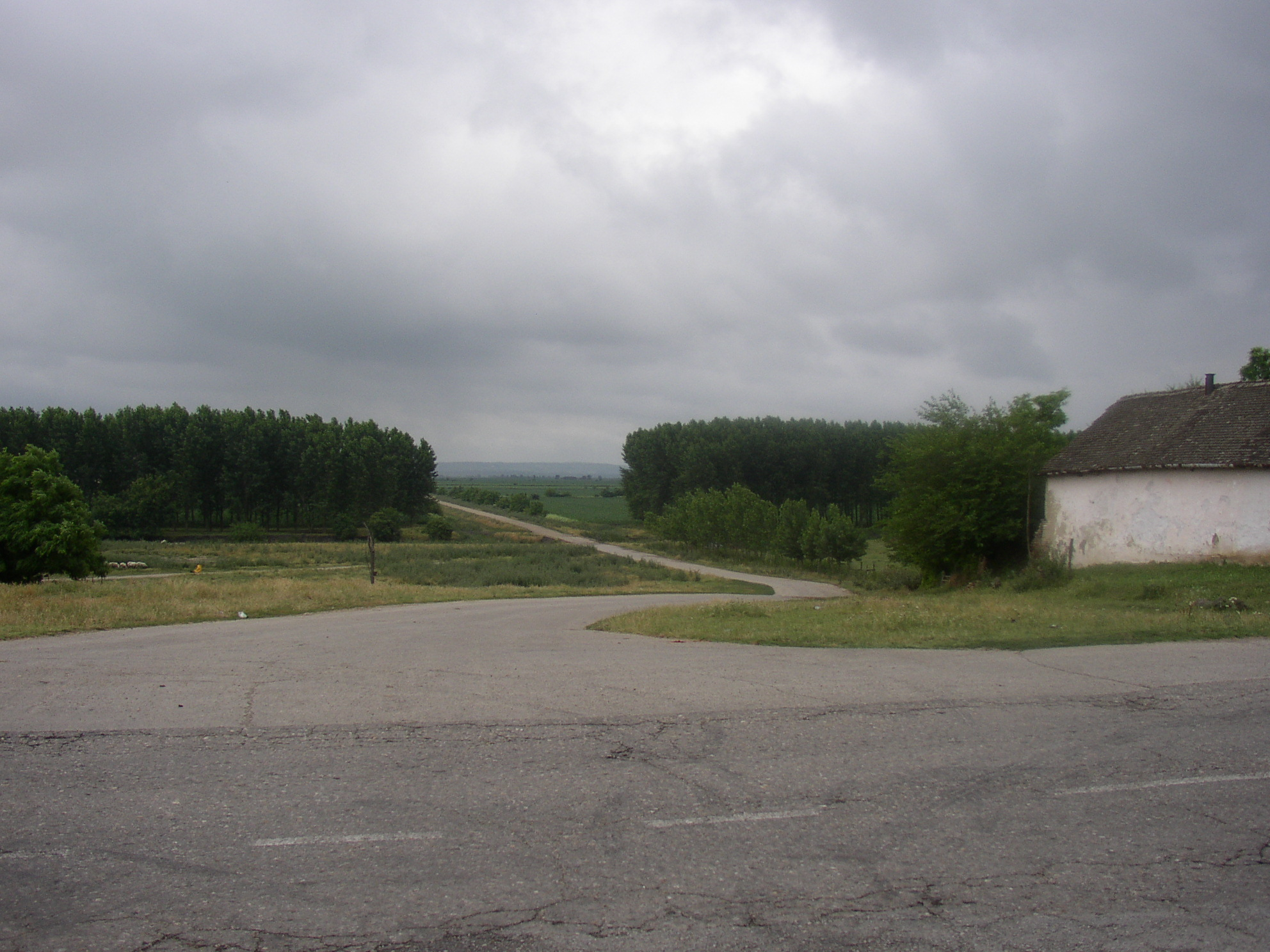
Summer storm in Skorenovac

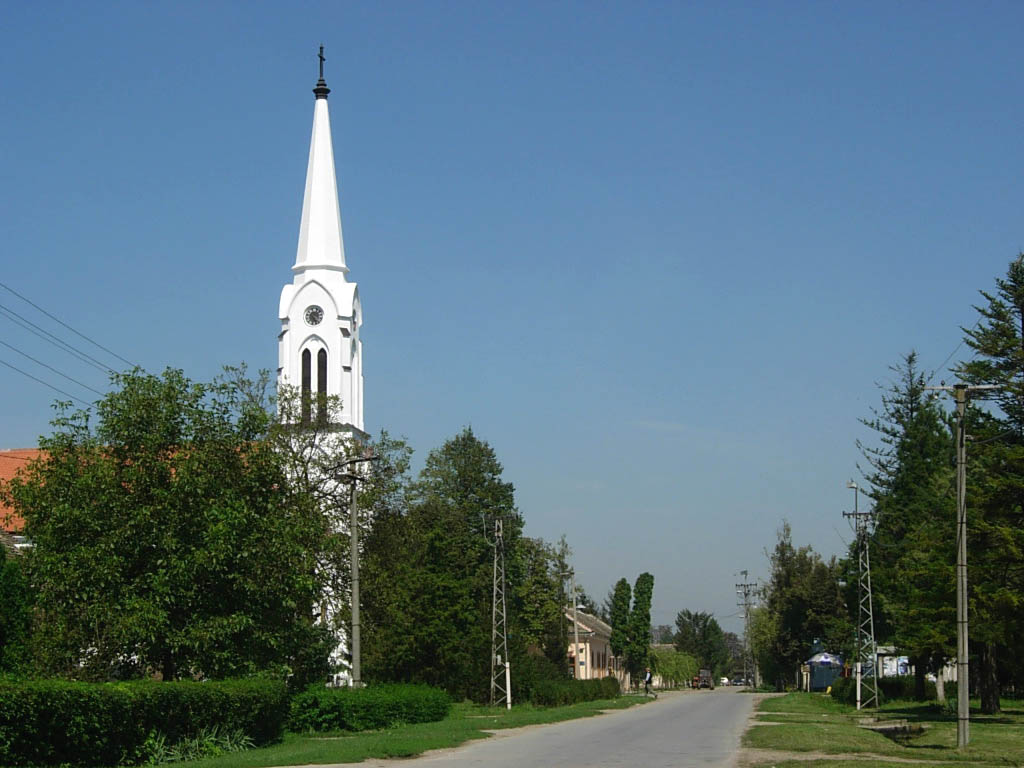
The Saint Stephen King Catholic Church

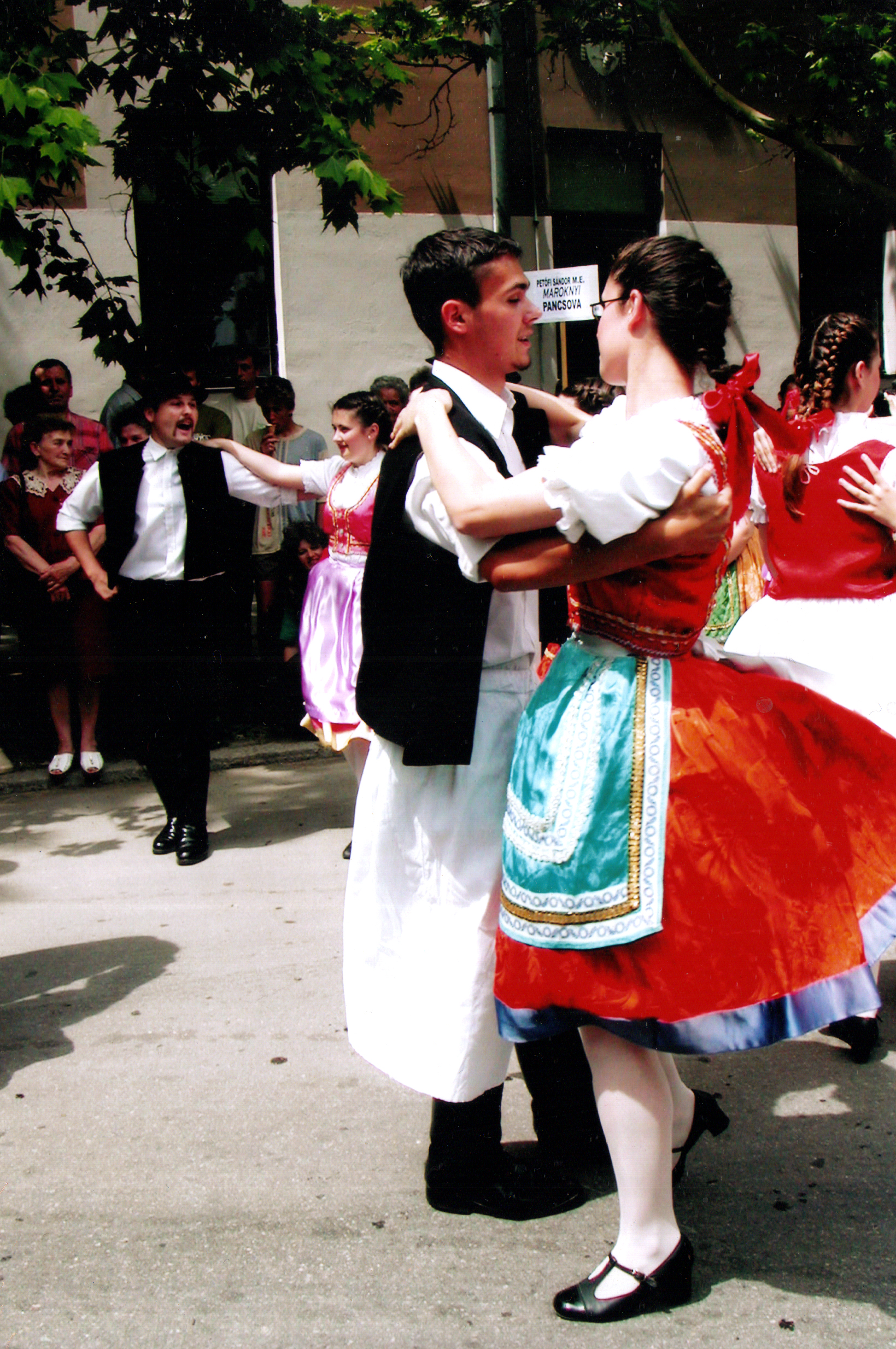
Csárdás

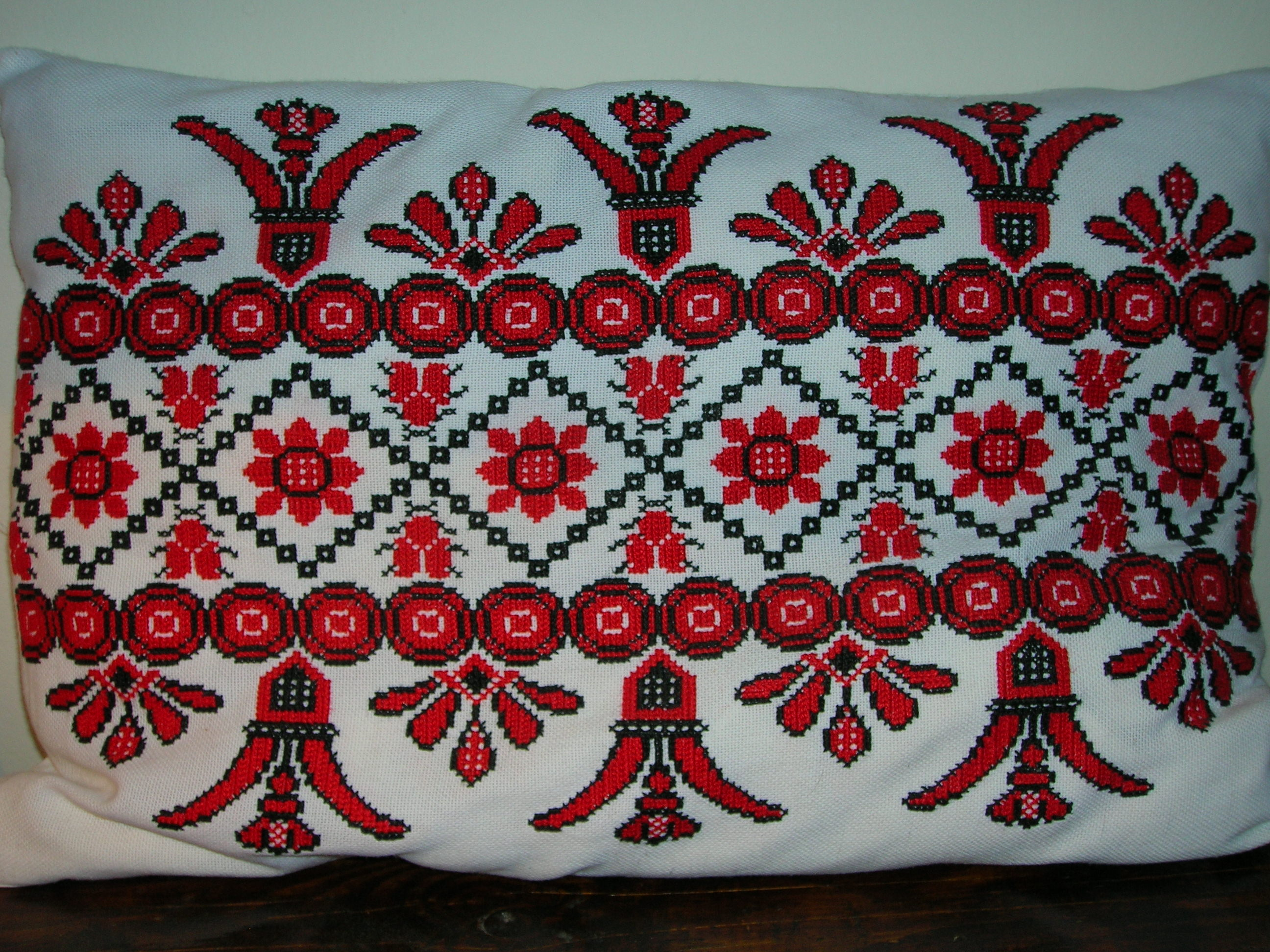
Pillow

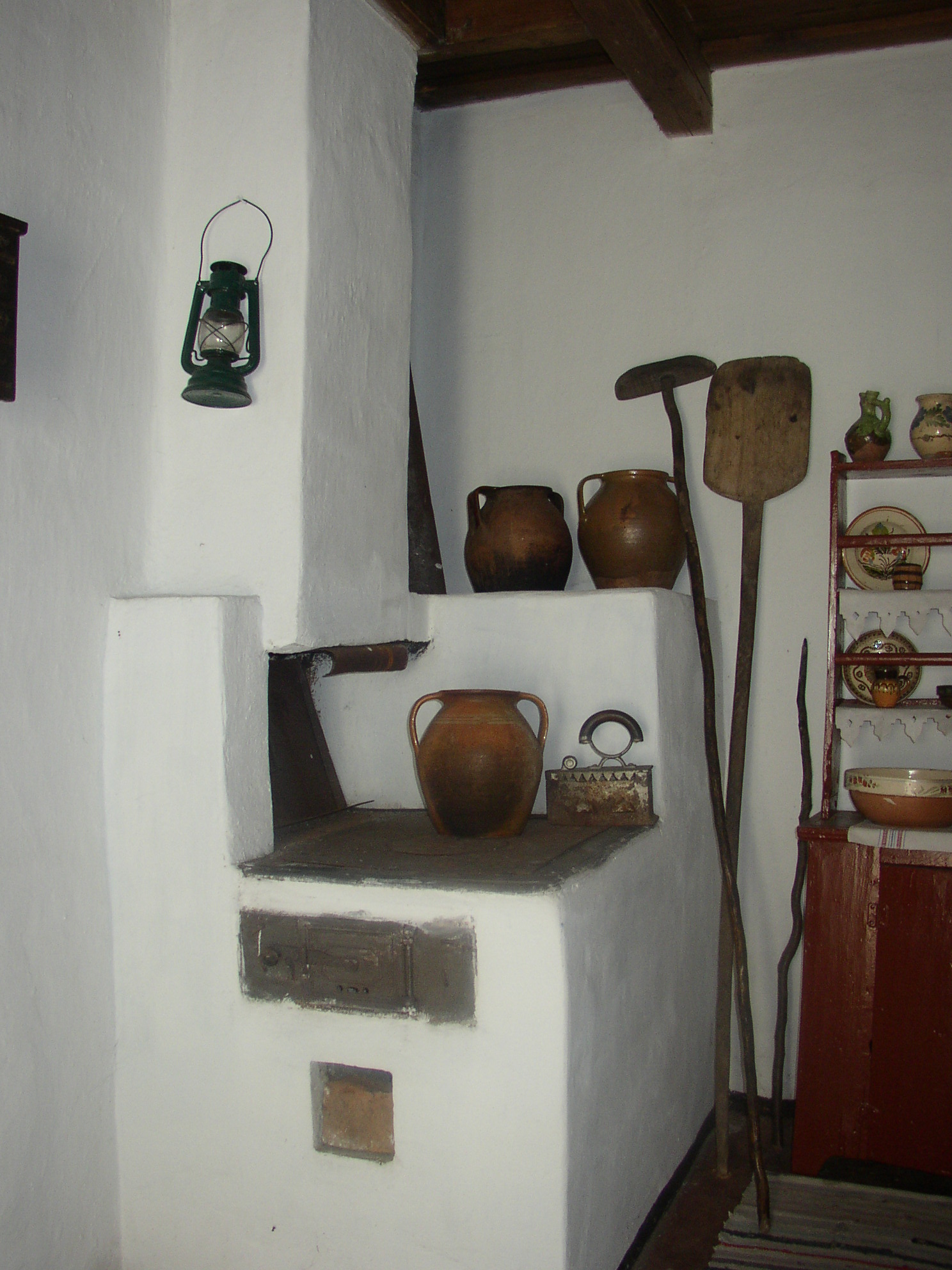
Traditional Kitchen

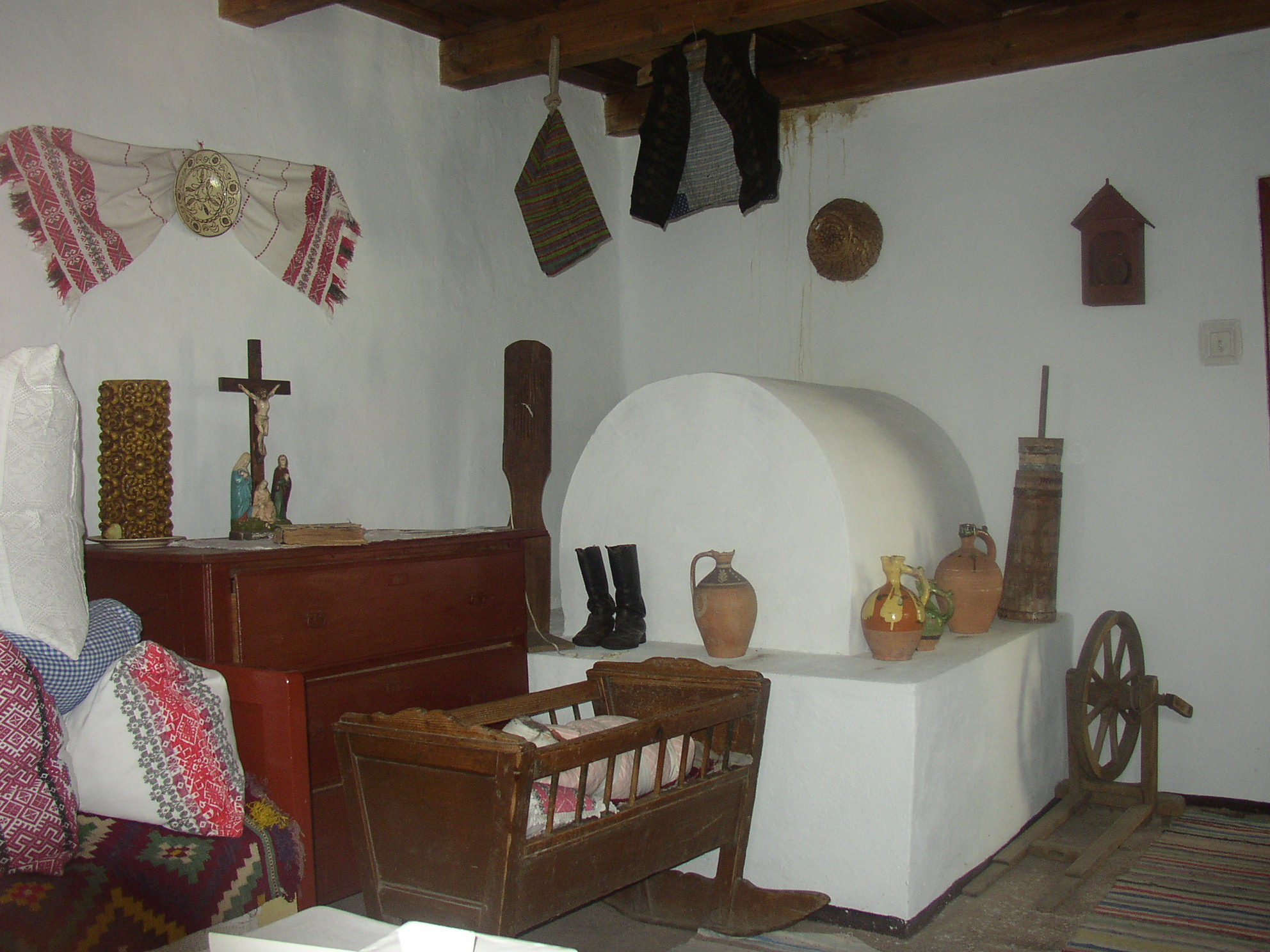
Traditional Living room

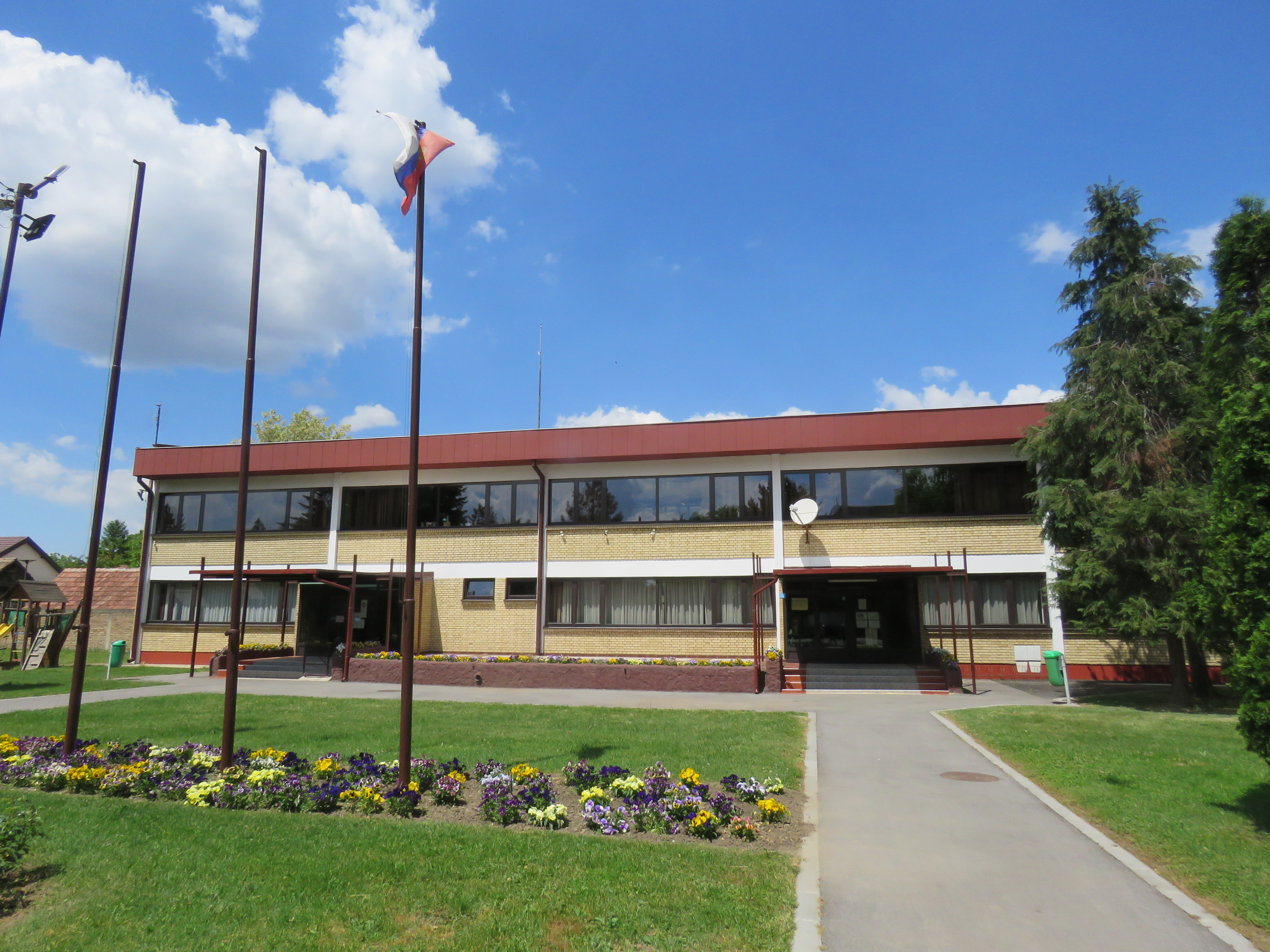
Elementary School in Skorenovac

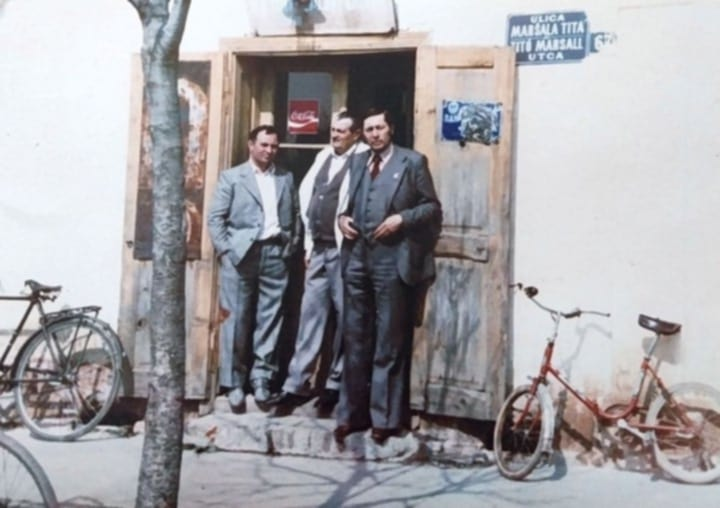
Village Pub from 60s/70s

== See also ==
- List of places in Serbia
- List of cities, towns and villages in Vojvodina
- Székelys of Bukovina
- Banat Bulgarians
- List of Székely settlements
