= Vojvodina Academy of Sciences and Arts =

Academic institution in Serbia

Vojvodinian Academy of Sciences and Art (Serbian: Vojvođanska akademija nauka i umetnosti / Војвођанска академија наука и уметности) or shortly VANU (ВАНУ) is an academic institution in Serbia in the Autonomous Province of Vojvodina. It is located in the capital of the province, Novi Sad. The current president of VANU is Livija Cvetićanin.

== Foundation ==
Vojvodinian Academy of Sciences and Arts (VANU) was founded in 1979. The modern academy was founded as a group of citizens on October 23, 2003 by a decree of Nenad Čanak, the then President of the Assembly of Vojvodina. Since December 15, 2009, it has been recognized as an academic institution that is functioning in AP Vojvodina. It was de jure unrecognized as an academic institution by authorities until December 15, 2009, when it was officially constituted by Assembly of Vojvodina. By the new statute of Vojvodina its status has been resolved.

== Purpose ==
VANU is the academy of the Autonomous Province of Vojvodina. Its main aim is to transmit traditions in sciences and arts of the multicultural and multiethnic area through cooperation with other academies and institutions. Its secondary goal is to improve living conditions in the Vojvodina region by using the spiritual and natural resources of Vojvodina.

VANU as a regional academy with ambition to grow into a mid-European one. It is oriented to the value system of the area and surroundings in which it acts, starting with certain principles. It sees globalization as unavoidable with respect to the standards of scientific and technological development but it has to preserve the values of the area, nation and their cultures and traditions in so far as they are in accordance with humanism and tolerance.

== Controversy ==
The organization has come into conflict with the Serbian Academy of Sciences and Arts (SANU). After the original VANU (1979–1992) ceased operating, its property and members were absorbed into SANU to the dissatisfaction of some members. According to statement issued by VANU, it also came into conflict with ultra-nationalistic organizations whose identities remain unknown. Some members even received letters of death threats from self-proclaimed 'patriotic' groups in Serbia.

== Members ==
As of April 2025

- Livija Cvetićanin, president
- Branimir Gudurić
- Rudolf Kastori
- Miroslav Ilić
- Ilija Ćosić
- Pero Zubac
- Radomir Folić, secretary-general
- Julijan Tamaš
- Srbislav Denčić
- Lajos Göncz
- Branimir Gudurić
- Sava Halugin
- Vukadin M. Leovac
- Endre Pap
- József Szalma
- Slobodanka Latinović

=== Corresponding members ===
- Jovan Lovrenski
- Biljana Škrbić
- Neda Mimica-Dukić
- Mihajla Đan
- Đula Mešter
- Ilija Tanackov
- Andraš Urban
- Agota Vitkai-Kučera
- Duško Radosavljević
- Jovan Komšić
- Miroslav Štatkić

=== Honorary members ===
- Radko Mesiar
- Wilhelm Brauneder
- Tamás Prugberger

== See also ==
- Serbian Academy of Sciences and Arts
