= Papps =

Papps is a surname. Notable people with the surname include:

- Alex Papps (born 1969), Greek-Australian actor, television host, writer, and singer
- Michael Papps (born 1979), New Zealand cricketer
- Peter Papps (born 1939), Australian sports shooter
- Stephen Papps, New Zealand actor

== See also ==
- Papp (disambiguation)
