= Géza Pap =

- Born: Shai Grünberger; 1883; Ungvár, now Uzhhorod in Ukraine
- Died: After 1952; Hungary

Géza Pap was a Jewish-Hungarian painter and artist. Born in Ungvár, then a part of the Austro-Hungarian Empire. He graduated from art school in Budapest in 1903. At times he visited the Nagybánya artists' colony. During the First World War he was a prisoner of war in Russia.
