= Endre Pap =

Serbian mathematician (born 1947)

Endre Pap is a mathematician in Serbia. He is a former rector and a professor emeritus of the Singidunum University in Belgrade.

Pap was born 26 February 1947 in Mali Iđoš in Vojvodina, Yugoslavia. B.Sc. 1970. M.Sc. 1973. Ph.D. 1975. Full Professor since 1986 at the Faculty of Sciences of the university in Novi Sad. Director of the Institute of Mathematics 1979–1980. He was a president of Academy of Sciences and Arts of Vojvodina (VANU). He is now a corresponding member of European Academy of Sciences (EAS). He is a member from the outside of the Public Organ of the Hungarian Academy of Sciences, since 2000. He is an honorary professor at Budapest Tech University since 2005, and a professor at the Obuda University in Budapest. He obtained in 2003 the October prize of the city Novi Sad for his scientific work. He was a member of the Accreditation Commission for High Education of Serbia since 2006, the president of Council for Natural Sciences, and a member of the Senat of the University of Novi Sad since 2007. He has been a member of the National Council for High Education since 2015. He was a long-time professor at the Singidunum University, Belgrade, rector and now he is a professor emeritus at the Singidunum University, Belgrade.

He has taught courses in partial differential equations, real analysis, complex analysis, decision theory, fuzzy systems, optimization methods, ordinary differential equations, and measure theory. He was in 1986 and 1988 a visiting researcher at ETH in Zurich, Switzerland; in 1992, 1993, 1994, 1995, 1996, 1998, 1999, 2001, 2002, 2004 at the University Johannes Kepler in Linz, Austria, where he was a visiting professor in 1997, 2003, 2006 (giving Ph.D. courses); in 1994 at the University in Potenza; in 1992, 1994, 1996, 2001 (giving Ph.D. courses) at the University Federico II in Naples, Italy; Universite Paul Sabatier, Toulouse, France, in 1999; University "La Sapienza", Rome, Italy, in 1999, 2003; Sorbonne in Paris, 2008.

== Research ==
His mathematical interests are in measure theory (non-additive measures), aggregation operators, decision making, fuzzy systems, functional analysis, theory of generalized functions, partial differential equations. He is the author of more than 420 scientific papers, 7 monographs, and 15 textbooks. He has more than 16 500 citations (h-index 49). He was the editor of proceedings of many international conferences, and he was the main organizer of the traditional international conferences on computational intelligence SISY. He is a collaborator for the Encyclopaedia of Mathematics, Kluwer Academic Publishers, Dordrecht (Springer). He has supervised 10 M.A. and 9 Ph.D. theses and has given 40 invited lectures and organized several scientific seminars. He was the head of Applied Analysis, Chairman of Nonadditive Set Functions Group. He is editor in the journal Fuzzy Sets and Systems (Elsevier) and Soft Computing (Springer), and member of the editorial boards of the journals Tatra Mountains Mathematical Publications, Acta Polytechnica Hungarica, "Panoeconomicus", Archive of Oncology, and YUJOR, a reviewer for Zentralblatt für Mathematik and Math. Reviews, a referee for 30 international and 4 Serbian journals, a member of OMG, AMS, EUSFLAT.
