= Papp =

Papp is a surname. As a Hungarian surname, it literaally means 'priest' in Hungarian. Notable people with the surname include:

- Daniel S. Papp, president of Kennesaw State University
- George Papp, American comic book artist.
- Gustáv Papp (1919–1997), Slovak operatic tenor
- János Papp (born 1948), Hungarian actor
- Josef Papp (c. 1933 – 1989), Hungarian-American engineer accused of creating a hoax
- Joseph Papp (1921–1991), American theatrical producer and director
- Joseph M. Papp (born 1975), American professional cyclist
- Krisztina Papp (born 1982), Hungarian long distance runner
- László Papp (1926–2003), Hungarian boxer and three-time Olympic champion
- László Papp (wrestler) (1905–1989), Hungarian wrestler and 1928 Olympic silver medalist
- Luccas Papp (Born 1992), Brazilian actor and playwright
- Paul Papp (born 1989), Romanian footballer of Hungarian origin (Pál Papp)
- Robert J. Papp Jr. (born 1952), Commandant of the United States Coast Guard and admiral
- Zsolt Papp (born 1981), Hungarian politician

== See also ==
- Pap (food)
- Pap (surname)
- Papps
