= Nera Gorge-Beușnița National Park =

National park of Romania

- Parcul Național Cheile Nerei-Beușnița
- IUCN category II (national park)
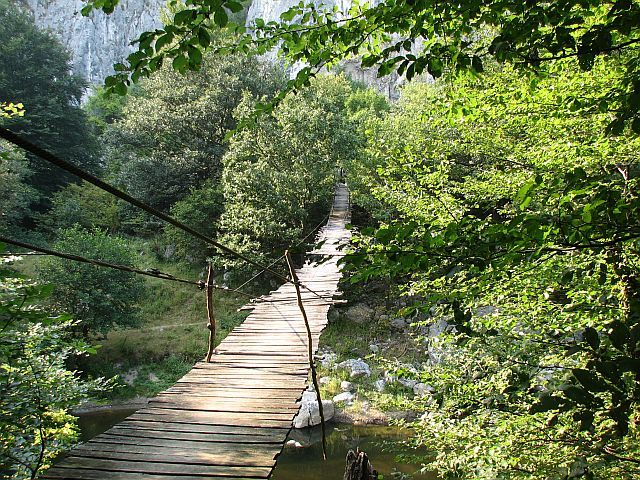
- Bridge over the Nera River

- Location within Romania
- Location: Caraș-Severin County; Romania
- Nearest city: Anina
- Coordinates: 44.925°N 21.802°E
- Area: 36,758 hectares (90,830 acres)
- Established: 2000

The Nera Gorge-Beușnița National Park (Romanian: Parcul Național Cheile Nerei-Beușnița) (national park category II IUCN) is a protected area situated in Romania, in Caraș-Severin County.

== Location ==
The Natural Park is located at the south-west limit of the country, in the south of the Anina Mountains (a mountain group included in the Banat Mountains), in Caraș-Severin County, on the middle course of Nera River and on the upper Beu River.

== Description ==
Nera Gorge-Beușnița National Park with an area of 36,758 ha (90,830 acres) was declared natural protected area by the Law Number 5 of March 6, 2000 (published in Romanian Official Paper Number.152 on April 12, 2000) and represents a mountainous area (mountain peaks, cirques, crevasses, caves, valleys, canyons, waterfalls) that shelters a large variety of flora and fauna; some of the species are endematic or very rarely.

Protected areas included in the park: Nera Gorge-Beușnița, Șușara Gorge, Ducin, Izvorul Bigăr, Izvoarele Nerei, Lisovacea, and Valea Ciclovei-Ildia.

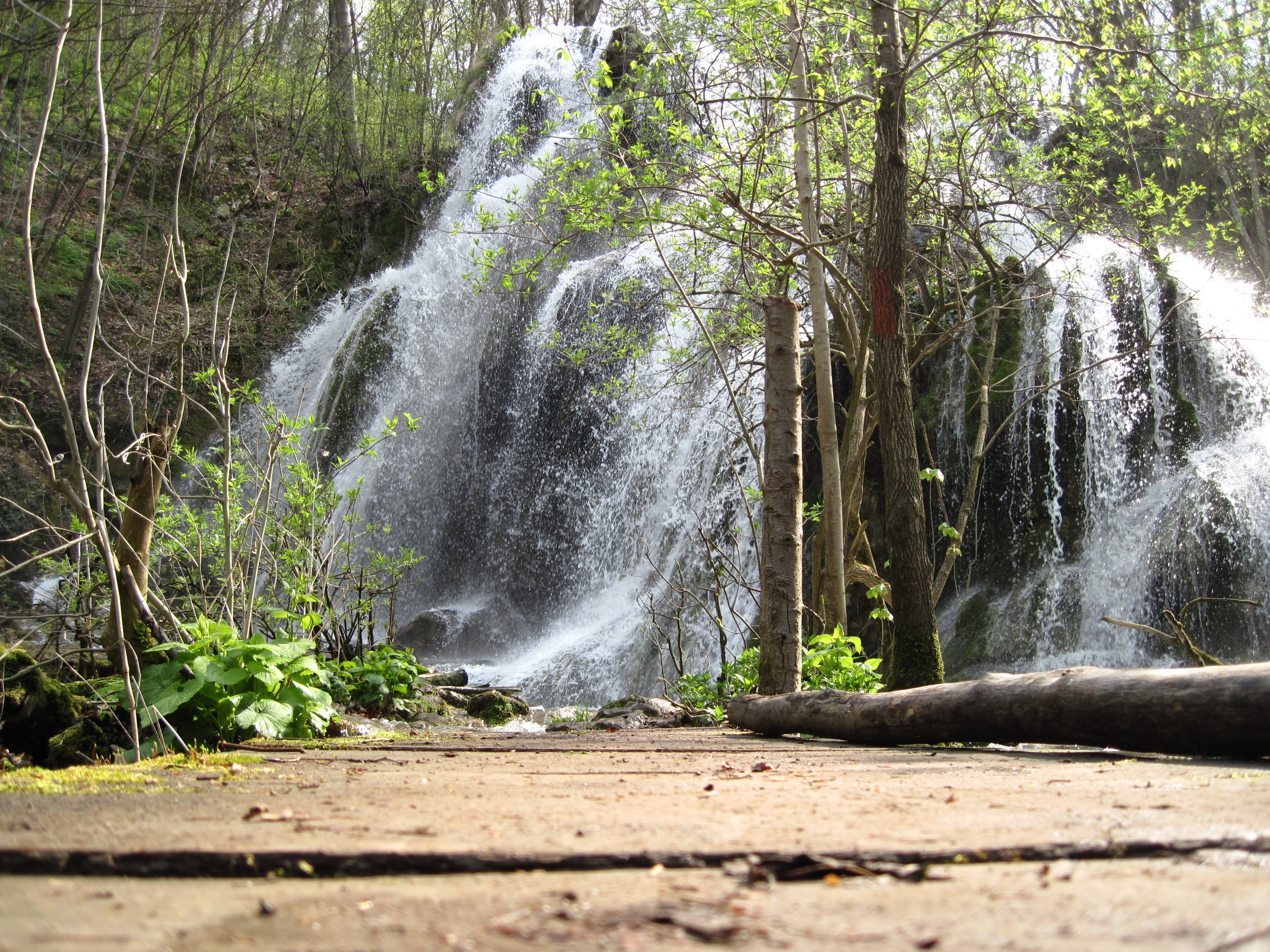
Waterfall Beușnița (Beu River)

=== Climate ===
Climate is a temperate continental, with moderate winters, warm summers, low thermal amplitude, with rich rainfall, with Mediterranean influences.

=== Hydrology ===
The hydrological network includes the Nera River and its tributaries: Coșava, Bănia, Beu, Ducin, Miniș, Nergana, Nerganița, Prigor, Rudăria, and Șopotu.

== Flora and fauna ==
=== Flora ===
On the territory of the protected area it has been identified several species of flora with European elements, Central European and Euro-Asian.

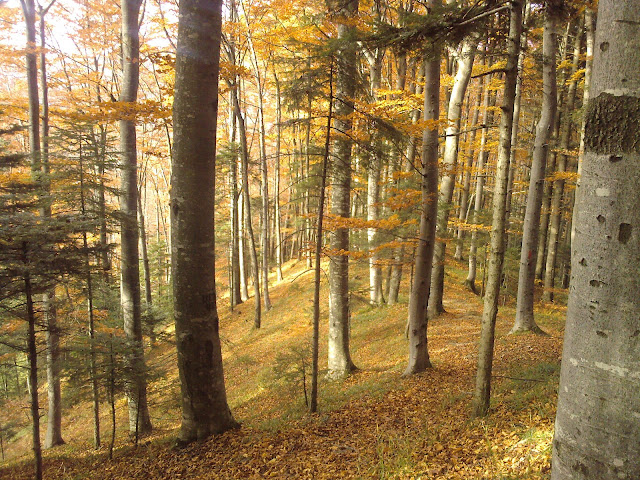
Mixed forest

Tree and shrub species include: English oak (Quercus robur), Common hornbeam (Carpinus betulus), European beech (Fagus sylvatica), European ash (Fraxinus excelsior), Turkey oak (Quercus cerris), Sessile oak (Quercus petraea), Black alder (Alnus glutinosa), European yew (Taxus baccata), Manna ash (Fraxinus ornus), Turkish hazel (Corylus colurna), European cornel (Cornus mas), Eurasian smoketree (Cotynus coggygria), Ruscus (species of: Ruscus aculeatus or Ruscus hypogllosum), and Lilac (Syringa vulgaris).

Herbaceous plants include: orchid Himantoglossum caprinum, fritillary Fritillaria montana, yellow linum (Linum uninerve), Asplenium ceterach (Ceterach officinarum), Cephalaria (Cephalaria laevigata), monkey orchid (Orchis simia), fragrant orchid (Gymnadenia conopsea), corydalis (Corydalis pumila), and yellow crocus (Crocus flavus).

=== Fauna ===
Species of mammals: brown bear (Ursus arctos), deer (Cervus elaphus), roe deer (Capreolus capreolus), gray wolf (Canis lupus), wild boar (Sus scrofa), European otter (Lutra lutra), lynx (Lynx linx), wildcat (Felis silvestris), pine marten (Martes martes), badger (Males males), pygmy shrew (Sorex minutus), Blasius's horseshoe bat (Rhinolophus blasii), and lesser mouse-eared bat (Myotis blythii).

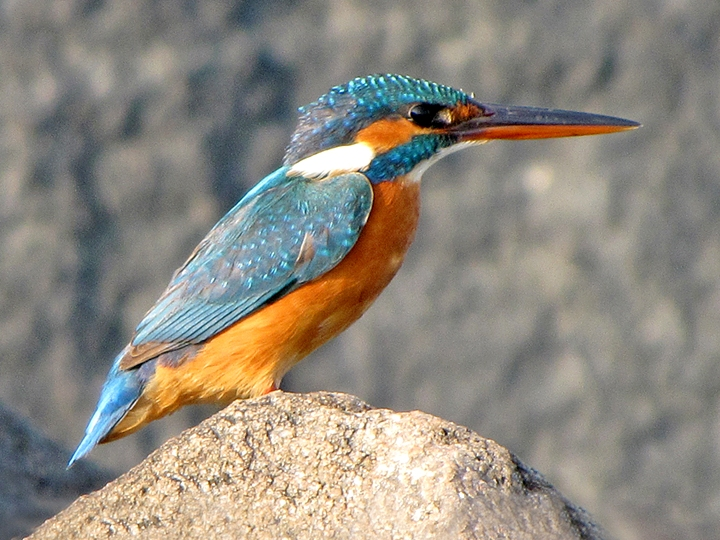
Common kingfisher

Species of birds: golden eagle (Aquila chrysaetos), lesser spotted eagle (Aquila pomarina), common kingfisher (Alcedo athis), hazel grouse (Bonasa bonasia), hen harrier (Circus cyaneus), Eurasian eagle-owl (Bubo bubo), short-toed snake eagle (Circaetus gallicus), red-breasted flycatcher (Ficedula parva), European honey buzzard (Pernis apivorus), European nightjar (Caprimulgus europaeus), grey-headed woodpecker (Picus canus), Ural owl (Strix uralensis), corn crake (Crex crex), barred warbler (Sylvia nisoria), red-backed shrike (Lanius collurio), ortolan bunting (Emberiza hortulana), European roller (Coracias garrulus), Montagu's harrier (Circus pygargus), and middle spotted woodpecker (Dendrocopos medius).

Species of reptiles, amphibians, and frogs: common adder (Vipera berus), green lizard (Lacerta viridis), smooth snake (Coronella austriaca), fire salamander (Salamandra salamandra), alpine newt (Triturus alpestris), common toad (Bufo bufo), and yellow-bellied toad (Bombina veriegata).

Species of fish: Danube gudgeon (Gobio uranoscopus), Mediterranean barbel (Barbus meridionalis), Sabanejewia aurata, streber (Zingel streber), Balkan loach (Cobitis elongata), Kessler's gudgeon (Gobio kessleri), and Amur bitterling (Rhodeus sericeus amarus).

== Access ==
- National road DN57B Oravița – Sasca Montană – Șopotu Nou – Cărbunari – Bozovici – Anina
- National road DN57B Reșița – Carașova – Anina

== See also ==
- Protected areas of Romania
- Iron Gates Natural Park
- Seven Natural Wonders of Romania

== Gallery ==
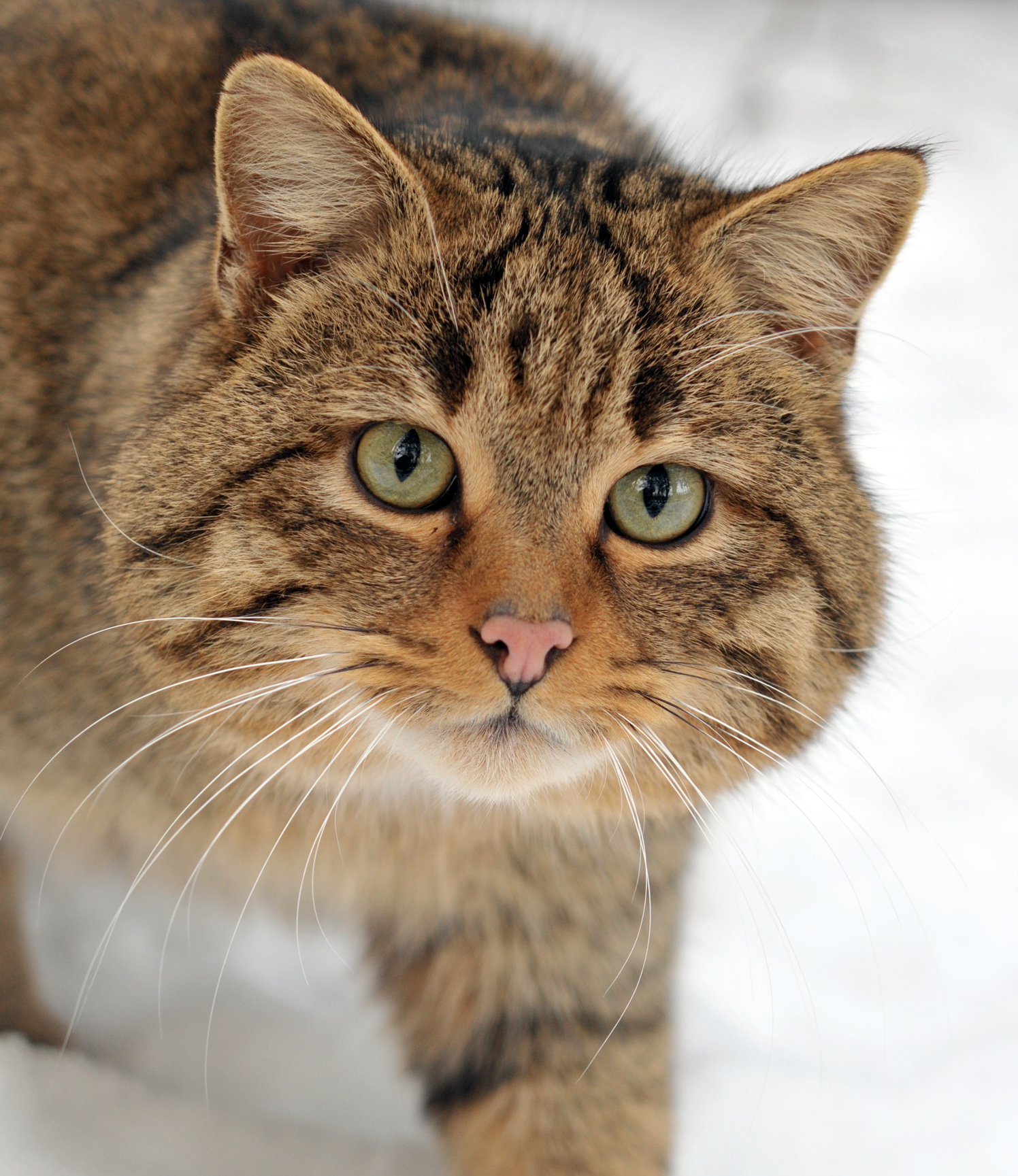
Wildcat

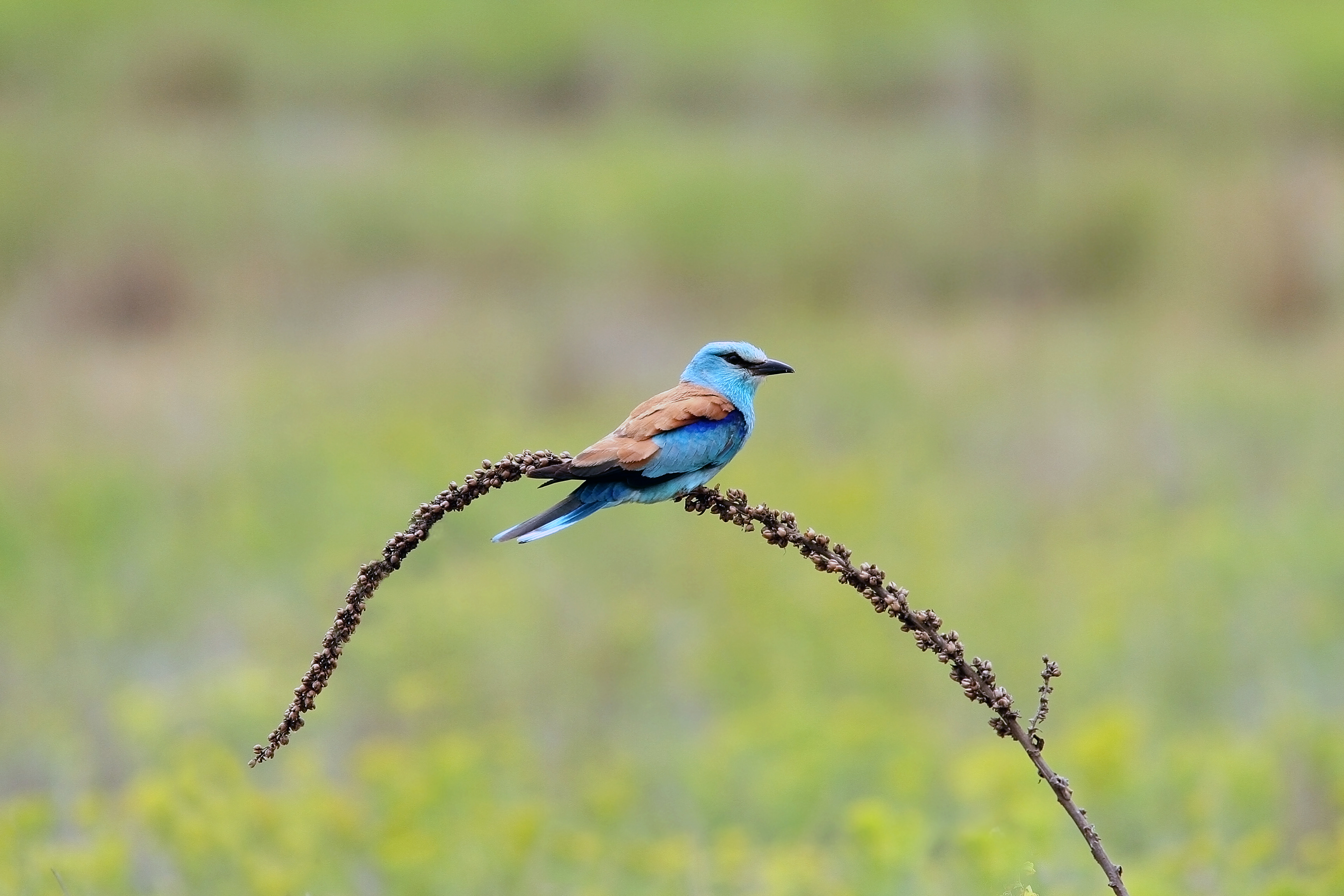
Coracias garrulus

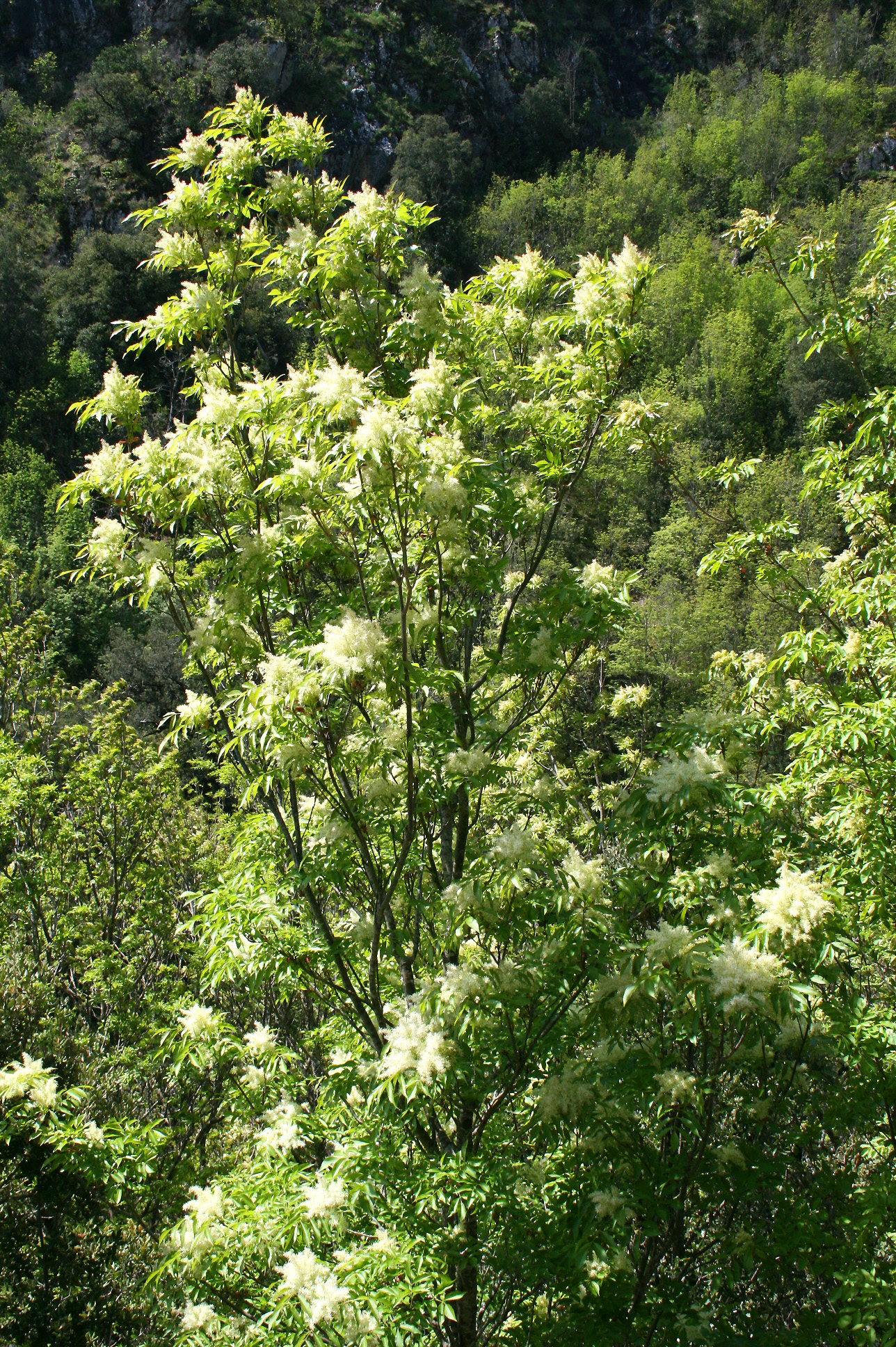
Fraxinus ornus

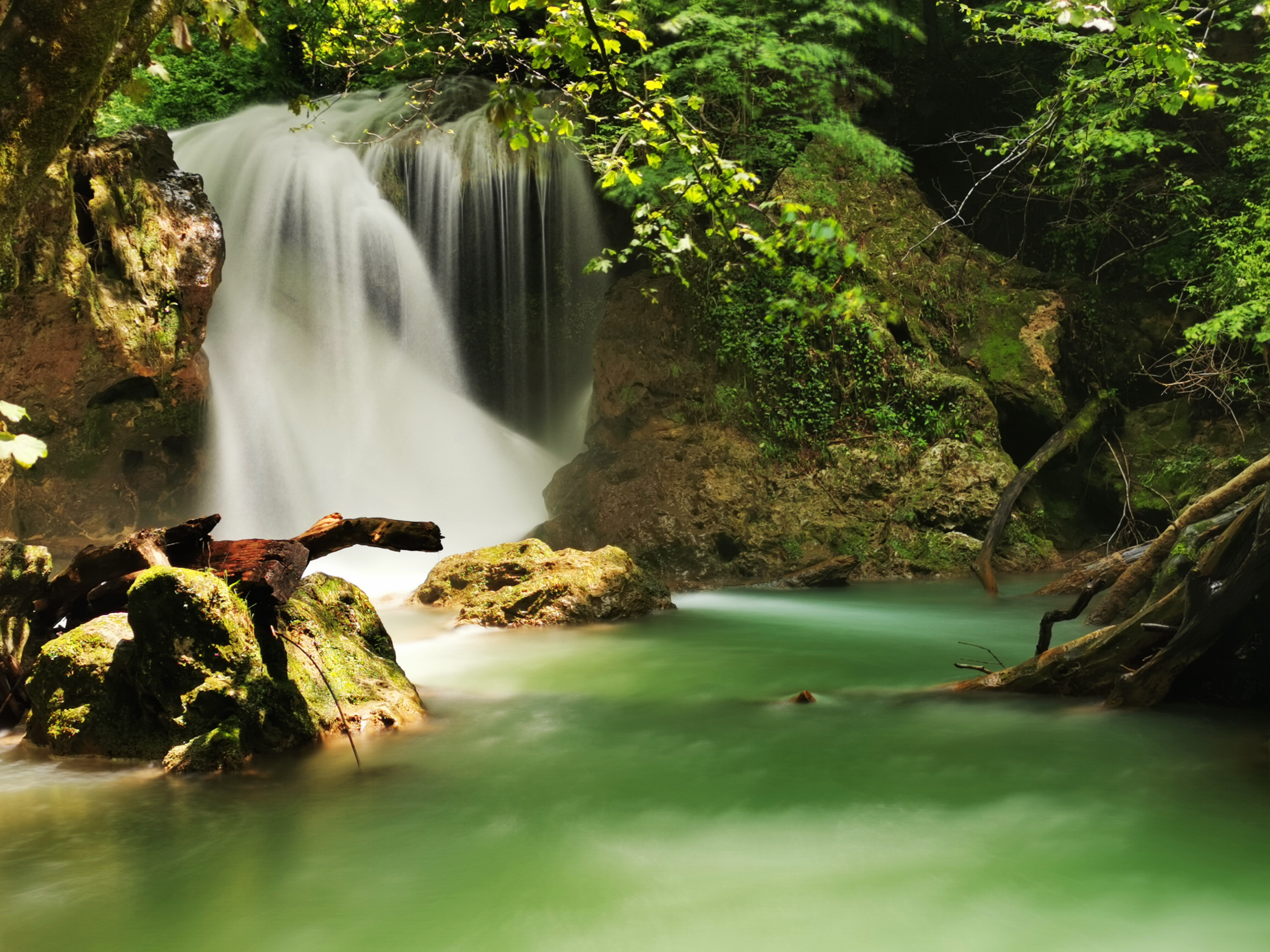
Vaioaga waterfall

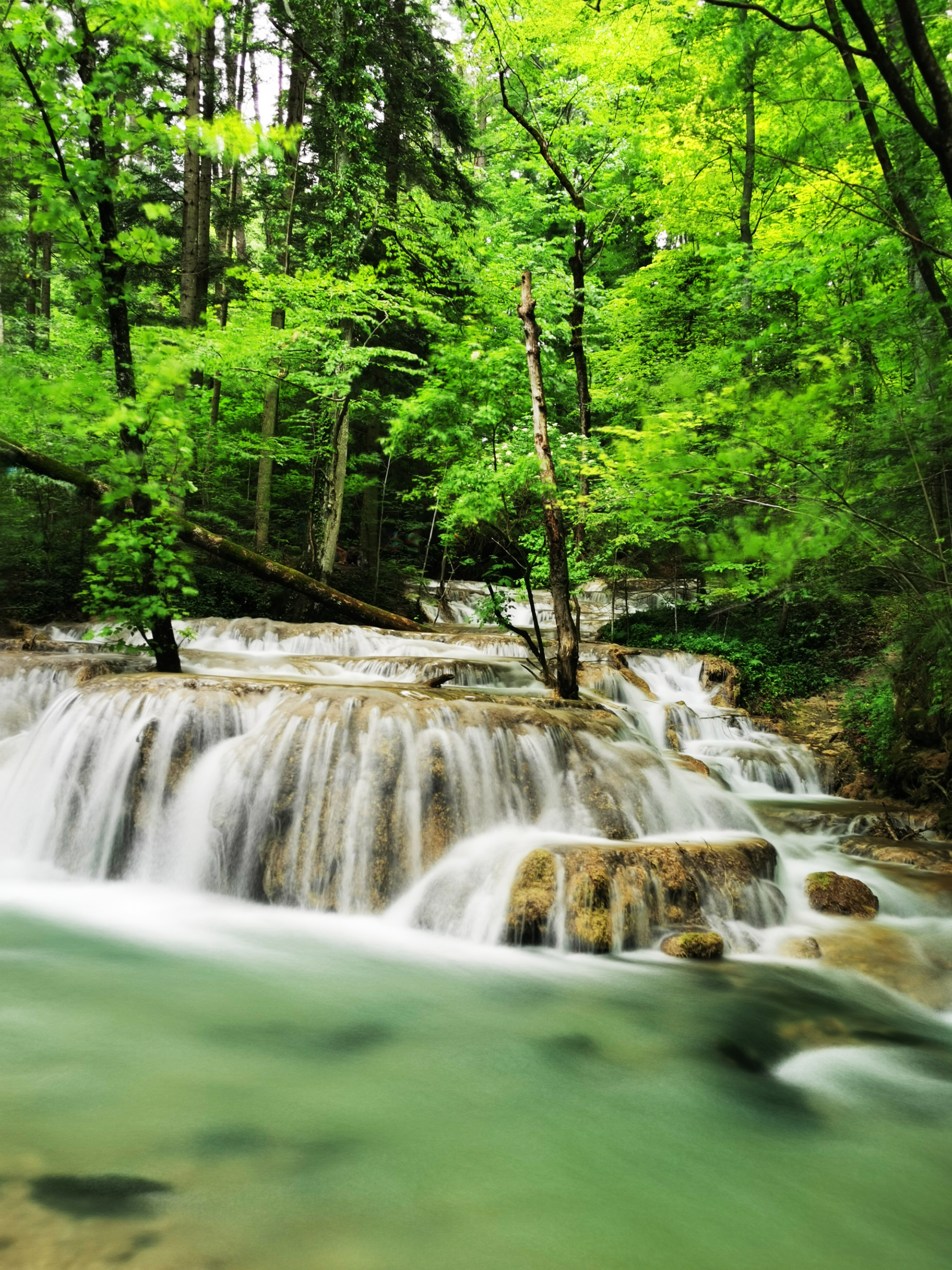
Beușnița (Beu) river bed

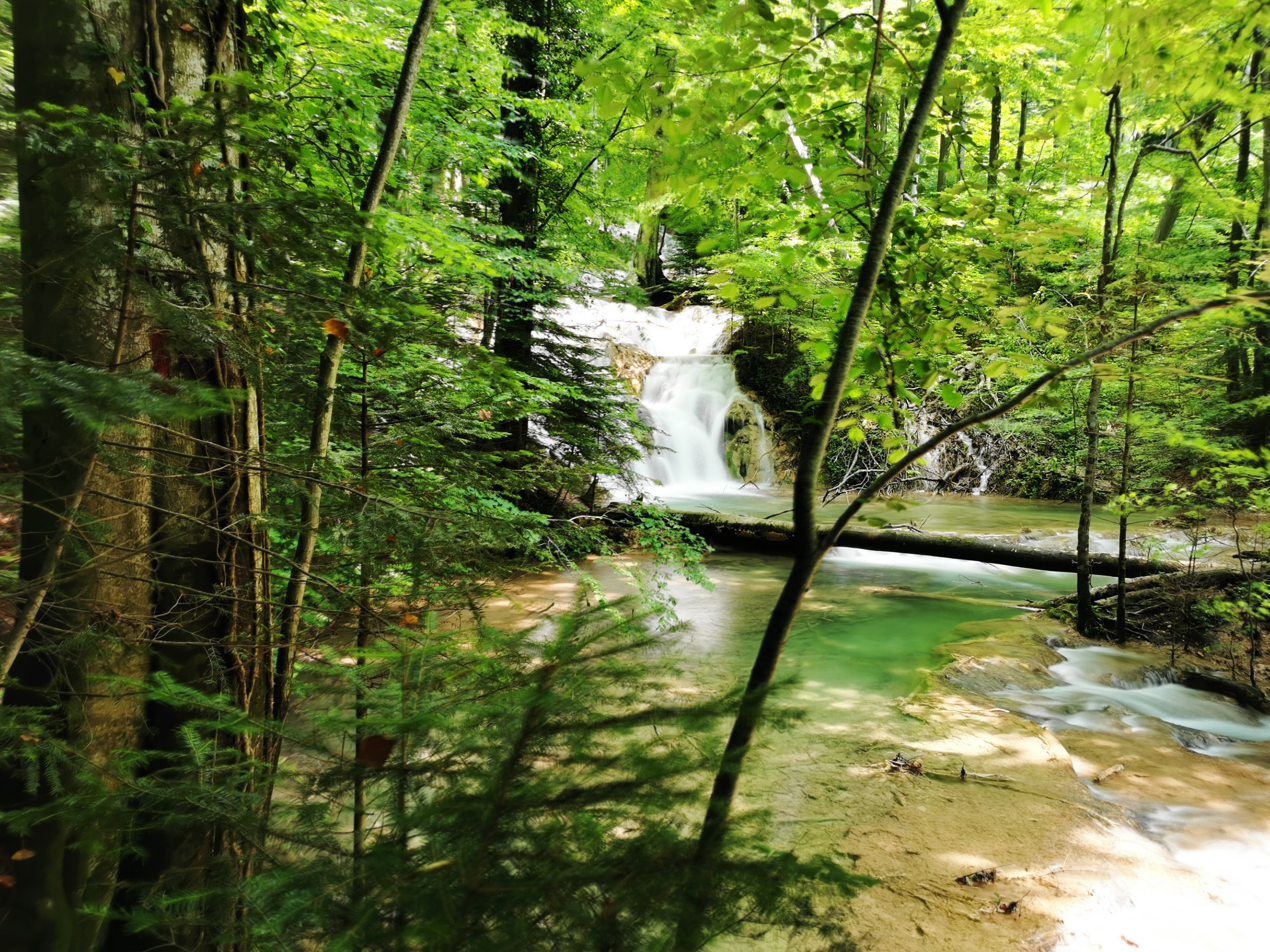
Beușnița (Beu) river bed

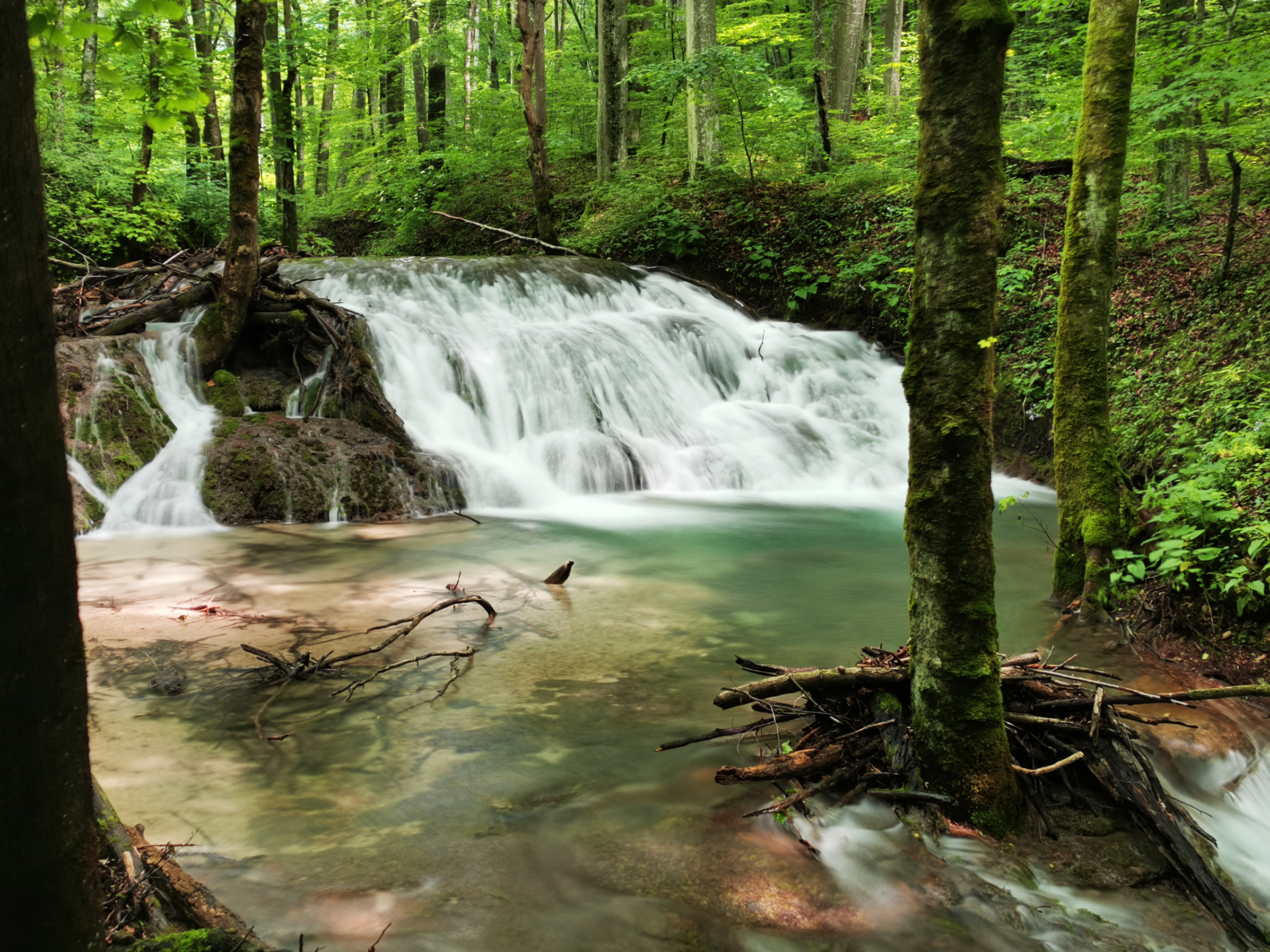
Beușnița (Beu) river bed

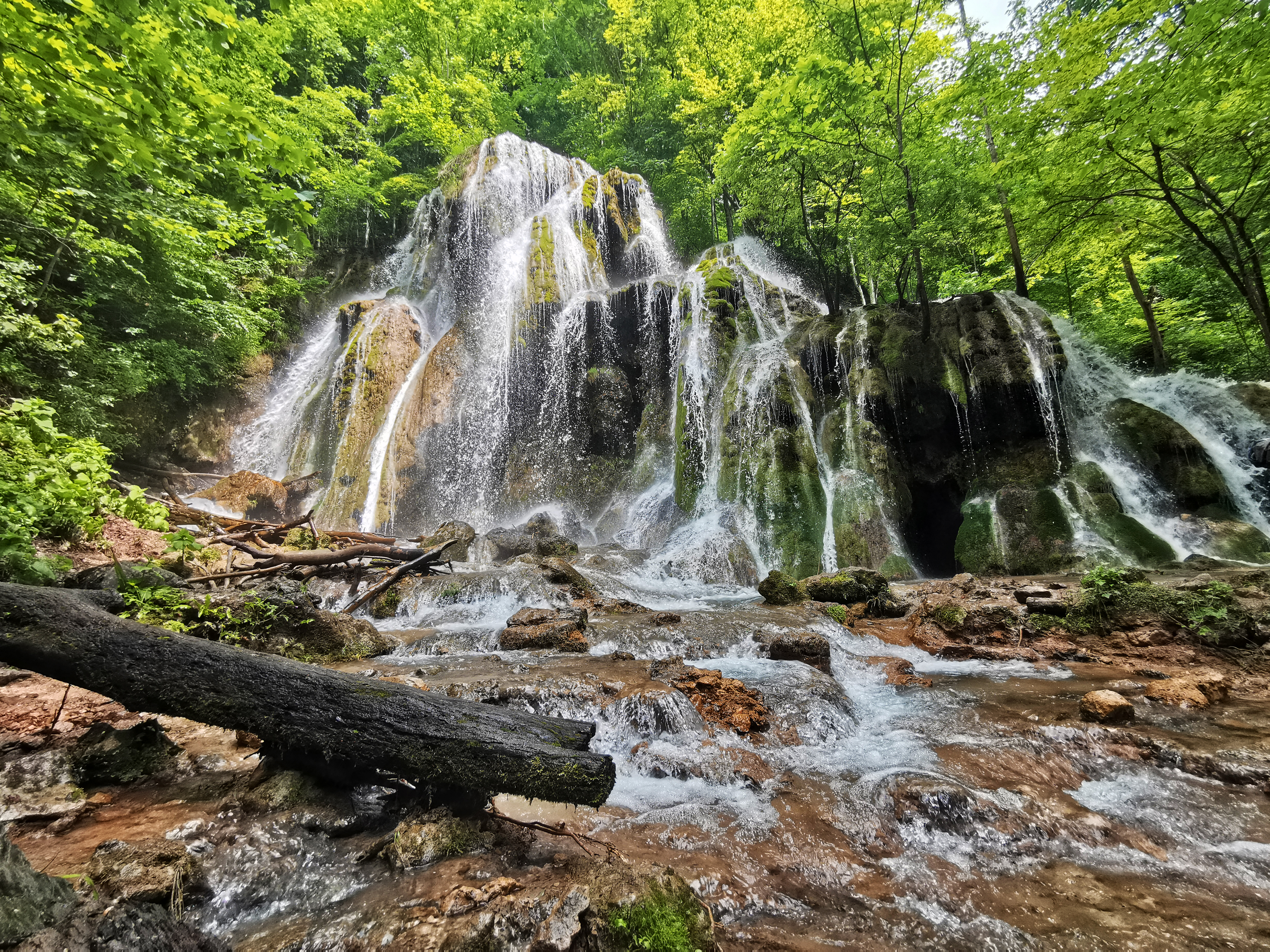
Cascade Beușnița
