= Lacul Dracului =

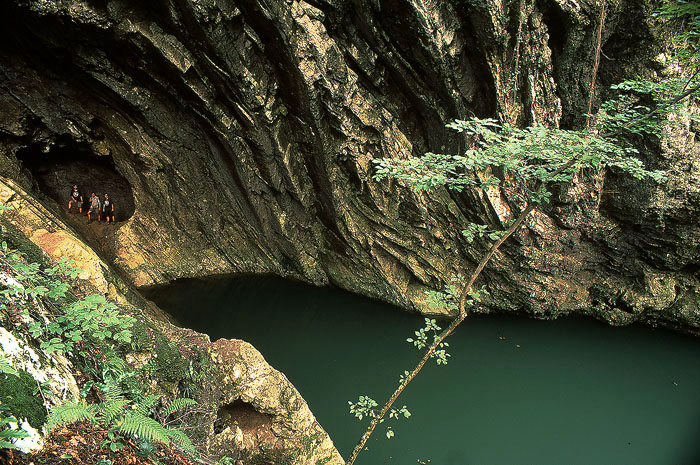

- Location within Romania
- Location: Caraș-Severin County, Romania
- Coordinates: 44°51′51″N 21°48′46″E
- Type: karst lake
- Basin countries: Romania
- Surface area: 700 m^{2} (7,500 sq ft)
- Max. depth: 12 m (39 ft)

Lacul Dracului (Romanian for "Devil's Lake") is a karst lake in Caraș-Severin County, Romania. It lies in the gorges of the river Nera, close to the river, between the villages Șopotu Nou and Sasca Română. It is the largest karst lake of Romania, with an area of 700 m^{2} (7,500 sq ft) and a depth between 9 and 12 m.
