= Lăpuș (disambiguation) =

Lăpuș may refer to several entities in Romania:

- Lăpuș, a commune and village in Maramureș County
- Lăpuș (river), a tributary of the Someș in Maramureș County
- Lăpuş Mountains, a subgroup of the Eastern Carpathians
- Târgu Lăpuș, a town in Maramureș County

== Lăpușnicu ==
- Lăpușnicu Mare, a commune in Caraș-Severin County, western Romania
- Lăpușnicu River, a tributary of the Nera River in Romania

== Lăpușnicul ==
- Lăpușnicul Mic, a tributary of the Râul Mare in Hunedoara County, Romania

== See also ==
- Lapus (disambiguation)
- Lăpușna (disambiguation)
- Lăpușel (disambiguation)
- Lăpușnic (disambiguation)
- Lăpușna County (Romania), a former county in the Kingdom of Romania,
- Lăpușna County (Moldova), a former administrative region of Moldova
- Lăpușnicel, a commune in Caraș-Severin County, western Romania
- Lăpușani, a village in Coșești, Argeş Commune, Romania
- Lăpușata, a commune located in Vâlcea County, Romania
- Lăpuștești, a village in Râșca, Cluj Commune, Romania
- Lăpugiu de Jos, a commune in Hunedoara County, Romania
