= Ogașu Mare =

Ogașu Mare may refer to:

- Ogașu Mare, a tributary of the Nera in Romania
- Ogașu Mare, a tributary of the Miniș in Romania
