= Ponor (Miniș) =

- Location within Romania

Location
- Country: Romania
- County: Caraș-Severin

Physical characteristics
- Source
  - location: Steierdorf
- Mouth: Miniș
  - coordinates: 45°01′42″N 21°50′16″E

Basin features
- Progression: Miniș→ Nera→ Danube→ Black Sea
- Tributaries
  - left: Bido

The Ponor is a tributary of the river Miniș in Caraș-Severin County, southwestern Romania. It flows through a system of caves, submerging in the Ponor Cave, and emerging from the Plopa Cave. It joins the Miniș about 200 m from its outflow from Plopa Cave.
