= Lapuz =

Lapuz may refer to:

- Lapuz, Iloilo City, in the Philippines
- Jose David Lapuz, a member-commissioner of the UNESCO National Commission of the Philippines
- Renaldo Lapuz, a Filipino-American who auditioned on American Idol

== See also ==
- La Paz
- Lapus
