= Poneasca =

- Location within Romania

Location
- Country: Romania
- Counties: Caraș-Severin County

Physical characteristics
- Mouth: Miniş
  - coordinates: 45.0100°N 21.9564°E
- Length: 14 km (8.7 mi)
- Basin size: 46 km^{2} (18 sq mi)

Basin features
- Progression: Miniș→ Nera→ Danube→ Black Sea
- Tributaries
  - left: Ogașu Bologhii
  - right: Gusec

The Poneasca is a left tributary of the river Miniș in Romania. It discharges into the Miniș near the village Poneasca. Its length is 14 km (8.7 mi) and its basin size is 46 km^{2} (18 sq mi).
