= Lighidia =

- Location within Romania

Location
- Country: Romania
- Counties: Caraș-Severin County

Physical characteristics
- Mouth: Miniș
  - location: Bozovici
  - coordinates: 44.9139°N 22.0011°E
- Length: 9 km (5.6 mi)
- Basin size: 21 km^{2} (8.1 sq mi)

Basin features
- Progression: Miniș→ Nera→ Danube→ Black Sea

The Lighidia is a right tributary of the river Miniș in Romania. It discharges into the Miniș near Bozovici. Its length is 9 km (5.6 mi) and its basin size is 21 km^{2} (8.1 sq mi).
