= Șușara =

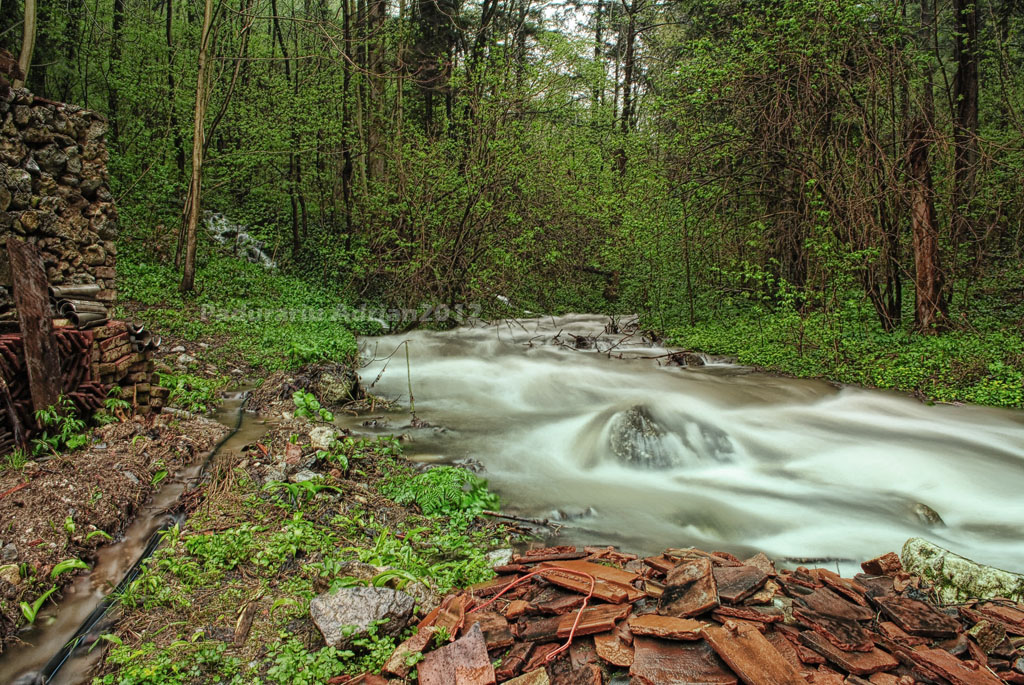
- Șușara River near Sasca Montană

- Location within Romania

Location
- Country: Romania
- Counties: Caraș-Severin County
- Villages: Sasca Montană

Physical characteristics
- Mouth: Nera
  - location: Sasca Montană
  - coordinates: 44.8859°N 21.7078°E
- Length: 8 km (5.0 mi)
- Basin size: 15 km^{2} (5.8 sq mi)

Basin features
- Progression: Nera→ Danube→ Black Sea
- Tributaries
  - left: Ungureanu

The Șușara is a left tributary of the river Nera in Romania. It discharges into the Nera in Sasca Montană. Its length is 8 km (5.0 mi) and its basin size is 15 km^{2} (5.8 sq mi).
