= Boiștea =

Boiștea may refer to several places in Romania:

- Boiștea, a village in Căiuți Commune, Bacău County
- Boiștea, a village in Petricani Commune, Neamț County
- Boiștea de Jos, a village in Coțofănești Commune, Bacău County
- Boiștea, a tributary of the river Cremenița in Caraș-Severin County, Romania
