= Boina =

Boina may refer to:

- It is the Spanish, Portuguese, Galician and Catalan word for beret.
- Dabbahu Volcano, also known as Boina, is a volcano in Ethiopia
- Boina, a former kingdom in Madagascar
- Boina, a village in Dalboșeț Commune, Caraș-Severin County, Romania
- Taxonomic synonym for Boinae, a subfamily of boid snakes.
