= Lapushnik =

Lapushnik or Lapusnik may refer to:

- Llapushnik (Лaпушник), a village in Kosovo
- Llapushnik prison camp, in Lapušnik, Kosovo
- Lăpuşnic, place names in Romania
