= Sasca Montană mine =

Copper mine in Caraș-Severin County, Romania

- Location: Sasca Montană, Caraș-Severin County, Romania
- Products: Copper

The Sasca Montană mine is a large copper mine located in the western part of Romania in Caraș-Severin County near Sasca Montană. Sasca Montană represents one of the largest copper reserve in Romania having estimated reserves of 12 million tonnes of ore grading 0.75% copper.
