= Coșava =

Coșava may refer to:

- Coșava, a village in the commune Curtea, Timiș County, Romania
- Coșava (river), a small river in Caraș-Severin County, Romania, tributary of the Nera
