= Răchita (Nera) =

Tributary of Nera River

- Location within Romania

Location
- Country: Romania
- Counties: Caraș-Severin County
- Villages: Valea Răchitei

Physical characteristics
- Mouth: Nera
  - location: Șopotu Nou
  - coordinates: 44.8209°N 21.8654°E
- Length: 16 km (9.9 mi)
- Basin size: 76 km^{2} (29 sq mi)

Basin features
- Progression: Nera→ Danube→ Black Sea
- Tributaries
  - left: Cremenița

The Răchita is a left tributary of the river Nera in Romania. It discharges into the Nera in Șopotu Nou. Its length is 16 km (9.9 mi) and its basin size is 76 km^{2} (29 sq mi).
