= Bârz =

- Location within Romania

Location
- Country: Romania
- Counties: Caraș-Severin County
- Villages: Bârz

Physical characteristics
- Mouth: Nera
  - coordinates: 44.8448°N 21.9128°E
- Length: 12 km (7.5 mi)
- Basin size: 28 km^{2} (11 sq mi)

Basin features
- Progression: Nera→ Danube→ Black Sea

The Bârz is a left tributary of the river Nera in Romania. It discharges into the Nera near the village Bârz. Its length is 12 km (7.5 mi) and its basin size is 28 km^{2} (11 sq mi).
