= Cremenița =

- Location within Romania

Location
- Country: Romania
- Counties: Caraș-Severin County
- Villages: Stăncilova

Physical characteristics
- Mouth: Răchita
  - coordinates: 44.8047°N 21.8377°E
- Length: 9 km (5.6 mi)
- Basin size: 33 km^{2} (13 sq mi)

Basin features
- Progression: Răchita→ Nera→ Danube→ Black Sea
- River code: VI.1.14.1

The Cremenița is a left tributary of the river Răchita in Romania. It flows into the Răchita in Urcu. Its length is 9 km (5.6 mi) and its basin size is 33 km^{2} (13 sq mi). It is formed near the village Cărbunari at the confluence of its sources Boiștea, Ogașu Vulpii and Ogașu Pietros.
