= Izvorul Bigăr =

- Bigéri-vízesés; Bigăr Waterfall
- IUCN category IV (habitat/species management area)
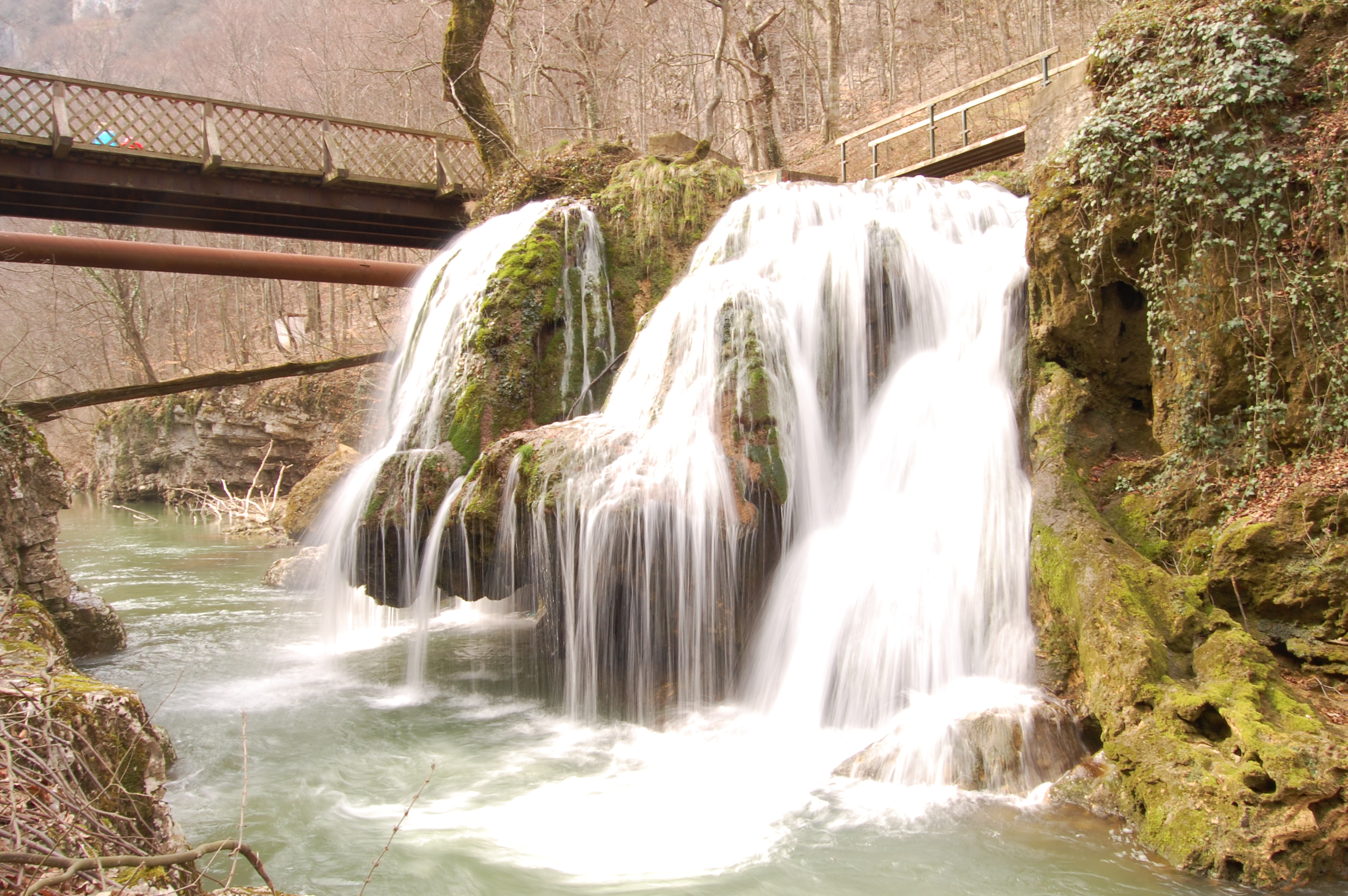
- Bigăr Waterfall

- Location within Romania
- Location: Caraș-Severin County; Romania
- Nearest city: Anina
- Coordinates: 45.003389°N 21.959703°E
- Area: 176.60 hectares (436.4 acres)
- Established: 2000, designation 1982

Bigăr (Hungarian: Bigéri-vízesés, English: Bigăr Spring, but more commonly known as Bigăr Waterfall) is a protected area (nature reserve IUCN category IV) situated in the administrative territory of Bozovici, in Caraș-Severin County in southwestern Romania. On 7 June 2021, part of the Bigăr waterfall collapsed.

== Location ==
The Izvorul Bigăr is located at the south-west limit of the country, in the south of the Anina Mountains (a group of mountains included in the Banat Mountains), in Caraș-Severin County, on the upper Anina River, in the Cheile Nerei-Beușnița National Park.

== Description ==
Izbucul Bigăr with an area of 175.60 ha was declared a natural protected area by the Law Number.5 of March 6, 2000 (published in Romanian Official Paper Number.152 on April 12, 2000).

Bigăr was one of the most unusual waterfalls in the world and one of the most beautiful in Romania. According to The World Geography, there are a number of facts that placed it as number one on the list of eight unique waterfalls around the world due to the way the water spreads and falls in tiny shreds of water, and also the fact that it is located exactly on the 45th parallel north, at the halfway point between the Equator and the North Pole.

On 7 June 2021, Romsilva announced the collapse of a part of the falls due to the weight of travertine and moss that had increased over time.

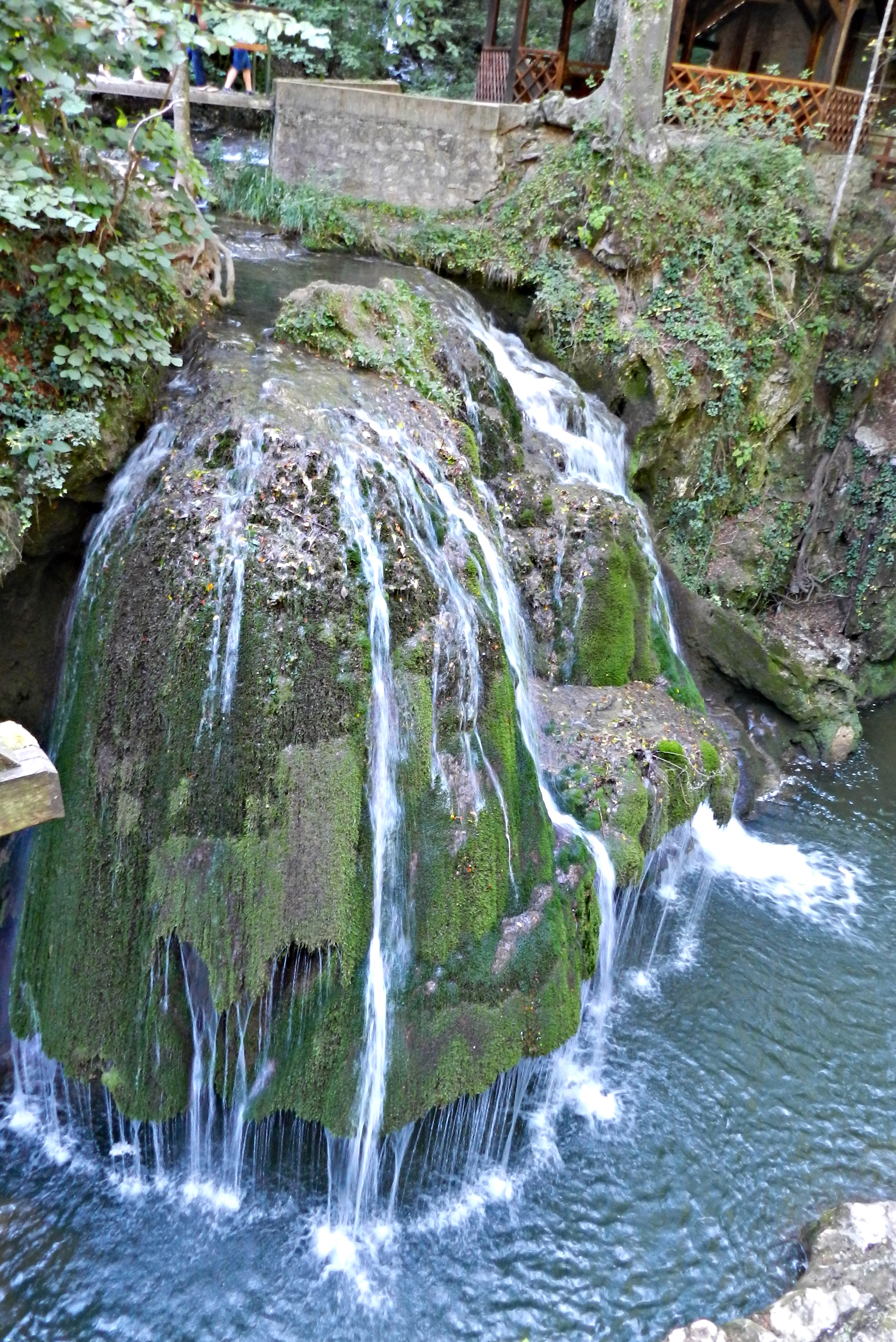
View from above

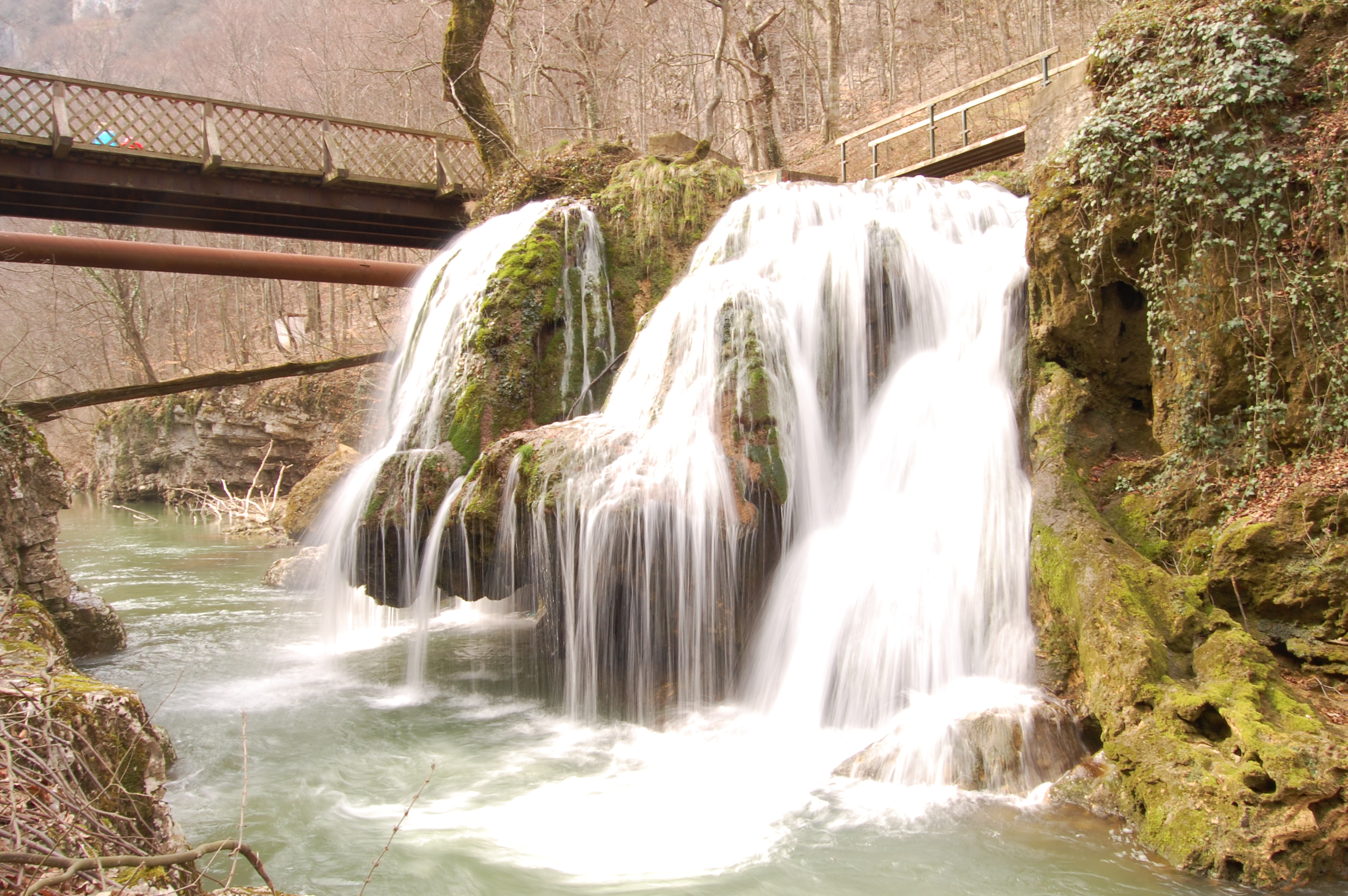
View from side

== See also ==
- List of waterfalls
- Tourism in Romania
- Seven Wonders of Romania
