= Lăpușnic =

Lăpușnic may refer to several places in Romania:

- Lăpușnic, a village in Dobra Commune, Hunedoara County
- Lăpușnic, a village in Bara Commune, Timiș County
- Lăpușnic, an alternative name for the upper course of the Râul Mare (Mureș basin) in Hunedoara County
- Lăpușnic (Nera), a tributary of the Nera in Caraș-Severin County

== See also ==
- Lăpuș (disambiguation)
