= Lăpușna =

Lăpușna may refer to:

- Lăpușna County (Romania), a former county in the Kingdom of Romania
- Lăpușna County (Moldova), a former administrative region of Moldova
- Lăpușna, Hîncești, a commune in Hîncești district, Moldova
- Lăpușna, a village in Ibănești, Mureș commune, Romania
- Lăpușna, the Romanian name of Lopushna village in Vyzhnytsia Raion, Ukraine
- Lăpușna, a tributary of the Gurghiu in Mureș County, Romania
- Lăpușna (Prut), a tributary of the Prut in the Republic of Moldova

== See also ==
- Lăpuș (disambiguation)
