= Lapus =

Lapus may refer to:

- Lapus (surname)
- Lăpuș, a commune in Transylvania, Romania
- Lăpuș (disambiguation), for a list of places in Romania sharing that name
