= Lăpușel =

Lăpușel may refer to:

- Lăpușel, a village in Recea, Maramureș Commune, Romania
- Lăpușel River, a tributary of the Izvorul River in Romania.

== See also ==
- Lăpuș (disambiguation)
