= Ducin =

- Location within Romania

Location
- Country: Romania
- Counties: Caraș-Severin County

Physical characteristics
- Mouth: Nera
  - coordinates: 44.8486°N 21.9158°E
- Length: 13 km (8.1 mi)
- Basin size: 23 km^{2} (8.9 sq mi)

Basin features
- Progression: Nera→ Danube→ Black Sea

The Ducin is a right tributary of the river Nera in Romania. It flows into the Nera near Bârz. Its length is 13 km (8.1 mi) and its basin size is 23 km^{2} (8.9 sq mi).

Tributaries include the Ducinoiu and the Ogașu Odăilor.
