= Alexander Louis Arch =

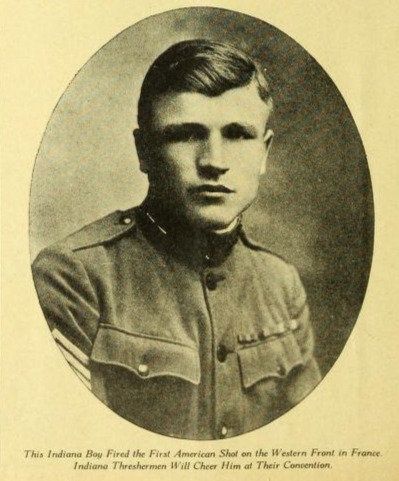
- Arch c. 1920
- Born: March 19, 1894; Potok, Austria-Hungary
- Died: December 9, 1979 (aged 85); South Bend, Indiana, U.S.
- Burial place: Chapel Hill Memorial Garden; Osceola, Indiana
- Military career
- Allegiance: United States of America
- Branch: United States Army
- Service years: 1913–1918
- Rank: Sergeant
- Nickname: Arch
- Units: Battery C, 6th Field Artillery Regiment
- Known for: First American to fire an artillery cannon in the First World War
- Conflicts: Mexican Border War; Pancho Villa Expedition; First World War; Meuse–Argonne Offensive; Battle of Cantigny; Montdidier-Noyon; Second Battle of the Marne; Battle of Saint-Mihiel

Alexander Louis Arch (March 19, 1894 – December 9, 1979) was an American soldier from South Bend, Indiana who served in World War I. Arch is known for being the first American to fire the first American shot during the conflict.

== Early life ==
Arch was born on March 19, 1894, in Potok, Austria-Hungary (now Romania). Around 1903 Arch's family moved to the United States and lived in the city of South Bend. Arch worked at the Oliver Chilled Plow Works and the Singer Corporation before enlisting in the United States Army on June 16, 1913.

== Military career ==
=== Mexican Border War ===
Arch received basic training at Fort Douglas before serving in the Mexican Border War and the Pancho Villa Expedition. Arch originally served as a Corporal before being promoted to Sergeant. Arch also received both the Silver Star and Purple Heart for his service in Mexico.

=== First World War ===
Arch's unit would be recalled into active service on April 6, 1917, when the United States entered World War I. Arch was deployed to the Western Front in France as part of Battery C of the 6th Field Artillery Regiment, 1st Infantry Division, which would sail for France in July 1917 and arrive at the port of Saint-Nazaire.^{:31} Arch's unit would immediately participate in the Meuse–Argonne offensive where Arch is noted as firing the first artillery shell from the American Expeditionary Forces.

On October 23, 1917, Arch's unit was in the vicinity of Réchicourt-le-Château in Moselle.^{:31} Battery C of the 6th Field Artillery Regiment, then under the command of the 1st Infantry Division was armed with the French 75mm Canon de 75 modèle 1897. Arch's Battery C is noted as being the first American artillery battery to fire an American artillery salvo at 6:05 A.M. at German positions nearby, Arch specifically being the soldier chosen to fire the first shell.^{:31}

The book Indiana Book of Merit: Official Individual Decorations and Commendations Awarded to Indiana Men and Women for Services in the World War states the following:

"The records of this Office show the first shot, marking the active American participation in the World War was fired by Battery C, 6th Field Artillery, at 6:05 A.M., on October 23, 1917. Sergeant Alex L. Arch was in command of the gun crew that fired the shot".^{:31}

Arch fought in the Meuse–Argonne offensive, the Battle of Cantigny, the defense of Montdidier-Noyon, the Second Battle of the Marne, and the Battle of Saint-Mihiel.^{:31} Arch was wounded twice during the war; once on April 1, 1918, in Toul and again on May 28, 1918, in Cantigny, Somme, during the Battle of Cantigny.^{:31}

== Later life ==
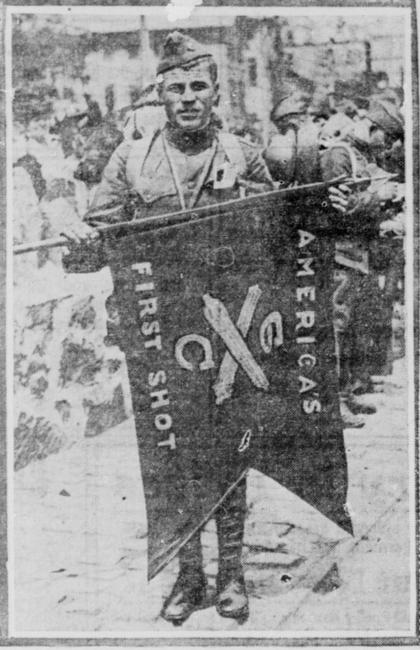
Sergeant Alexander L. Arch in New York City on September 10, 1919

On his return to the United States Arch took part in the 1st Infantry Division's victory parade in New York on September 10, 1919. Arch returned to South Bend in late September 1919, his arrival at South Bend was greeted with a $2,000 parade and festivities along with a welcome home party from his family, neighbors, and friends. October 29, 1919, was designated as "Alex Arch Day".

Following the war Arch worked for the Studebaker Corporation which was headquartered in South Bend. In 1921 Arch was selected to represent Indiana as a mourner alongside soldiers Samuel Woodfill, Paul Cunningham, and Henry Strobel at the dedication of the Tomb of the Unknown Soldier.

During World War II Arch was featured in several war bond advertisements alongside Carole Lombard of Fort Wayne, Indiana. Lombard appeared alongside Arch at a 1941 Indiana war rally shortly before her death in January 1942.

== Personal life and death ==
Arch married Julia J. Rebics, they had a total of three children. Arch died on December 9, 1979, he is buried in Osceola, Indiana.

== Legacy ==
Arch Avenue in South Bena is named after Alexander Louis Arch.
