= Beu (river) =

Beu Beu Sec
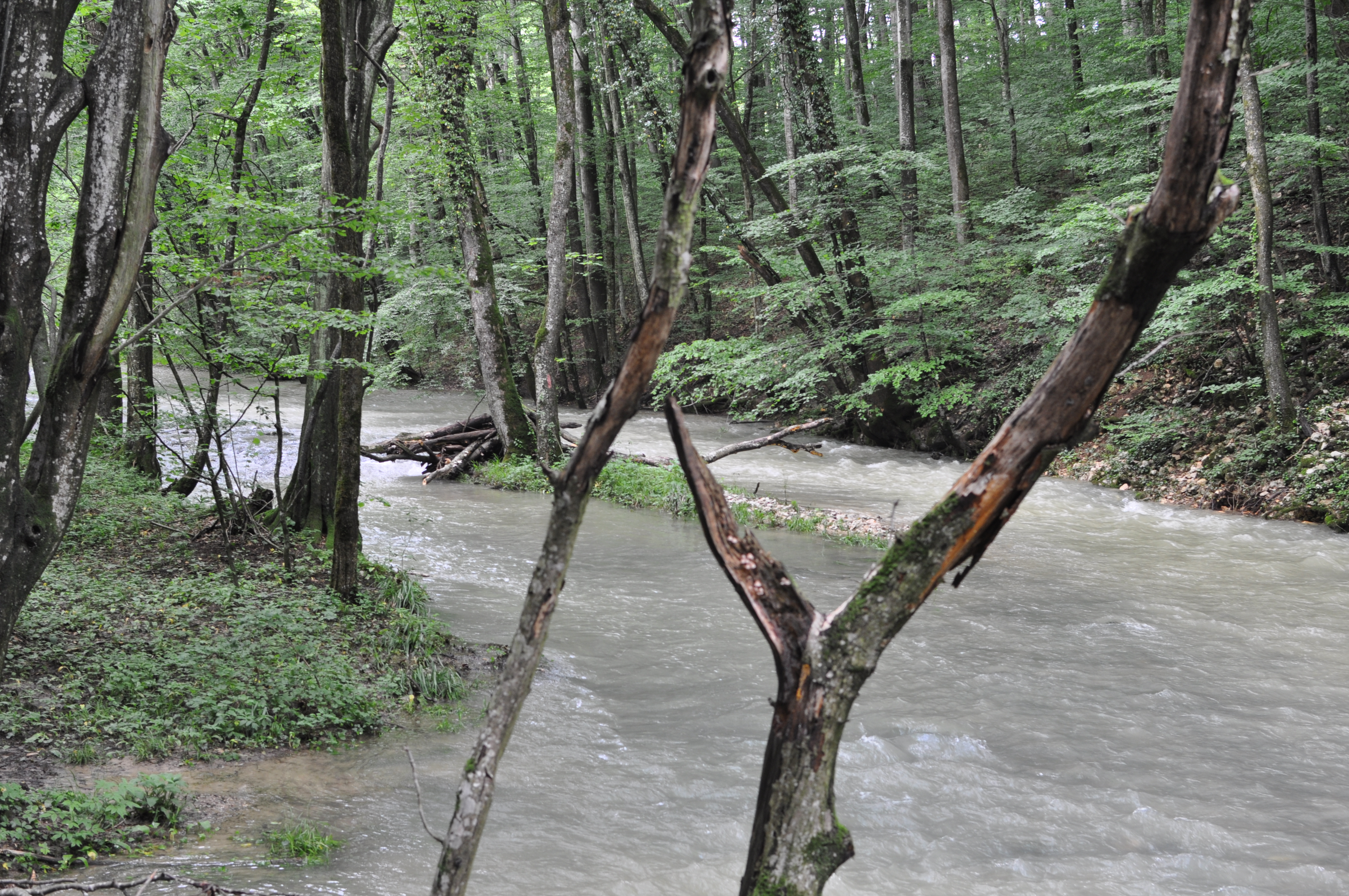
- Beu river

- Location within Romania

Location
- Country: Romania
- Counties: Caraș-Severin County

Physical characteristics
- Mouth: Nera
  - coordinates: 44.9021°N 21.7472°E
- Length: 19 km (12 mi)
- Basin size: 53 km^{2} (20 sq mi)

Basin features
- Progression: Nera→ Danube→ Black Sea
- Tributaries
  - left: Beușnița
  - right: Seleștiuța, Chichireg

The Beu is a right tributary of the river Nera in Romania. It discharges into the Nera upstream from Sasca Română. Its length is 19 km (12 mi) and its basin size is 53 km^{2} (20 sq mi). The upper reach of the river is also known as Beu Sec or Răcăjdianu.

== Gallery ==
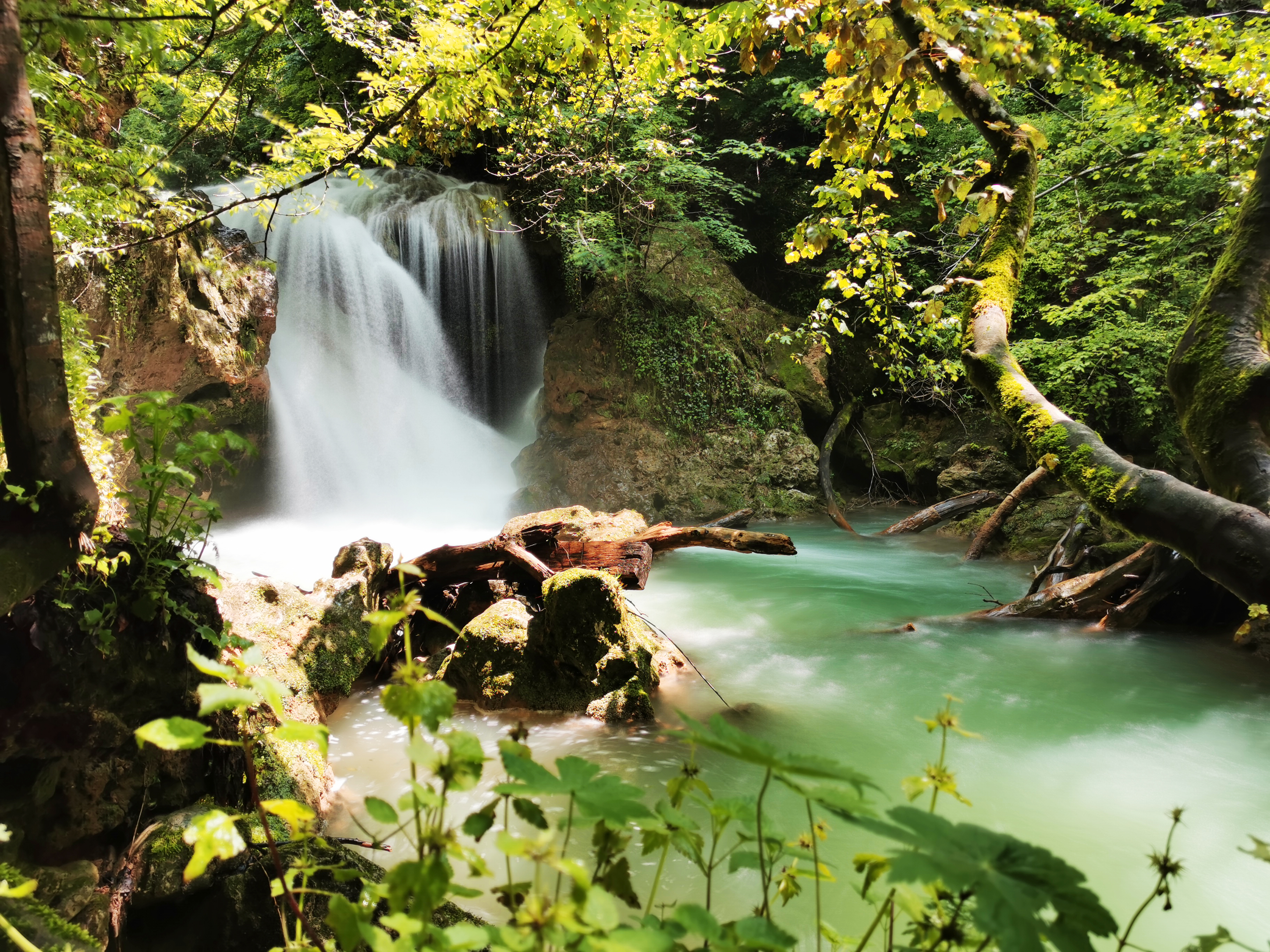
Vaioaga waterfall

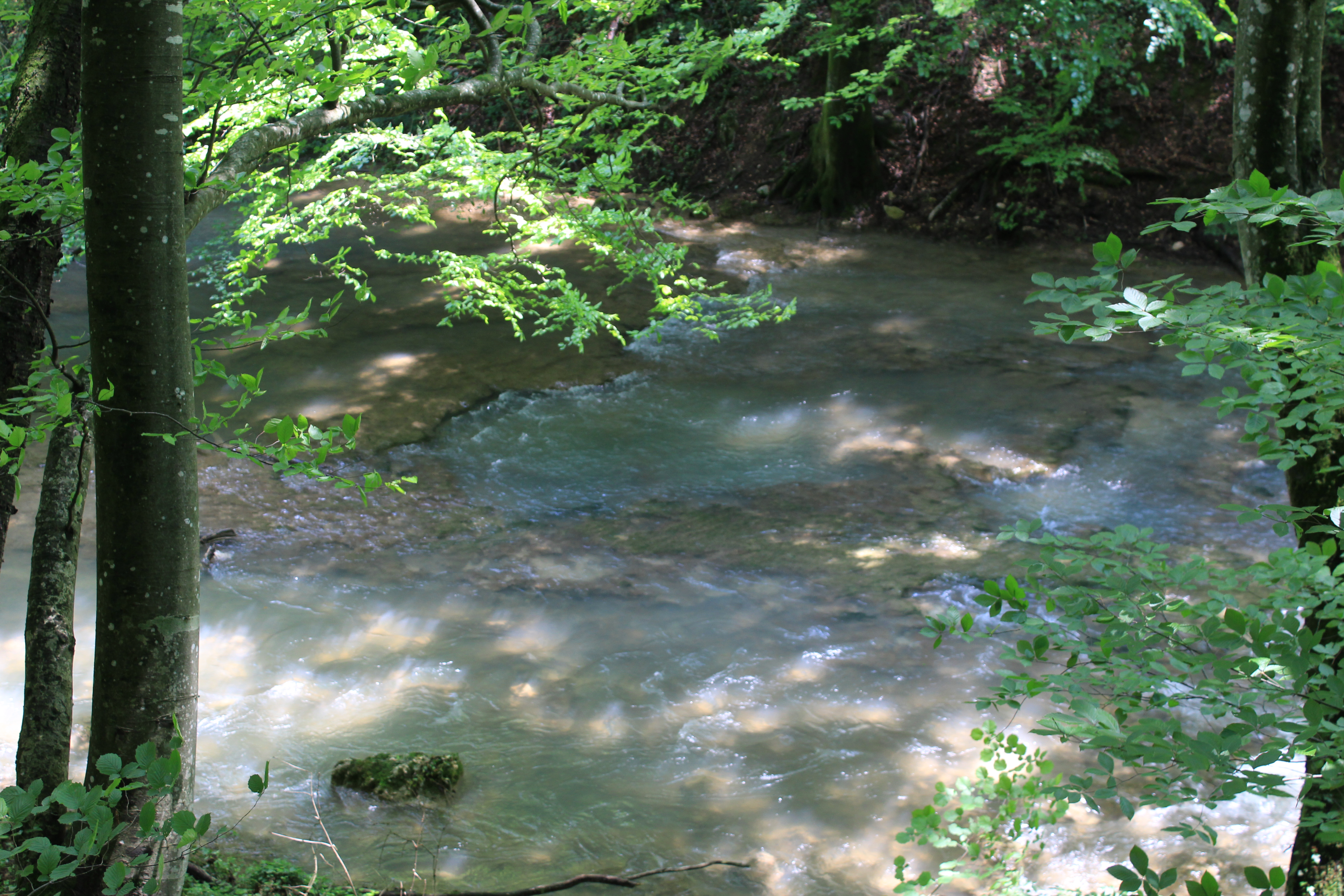
Beușnița (Beu) river bed.

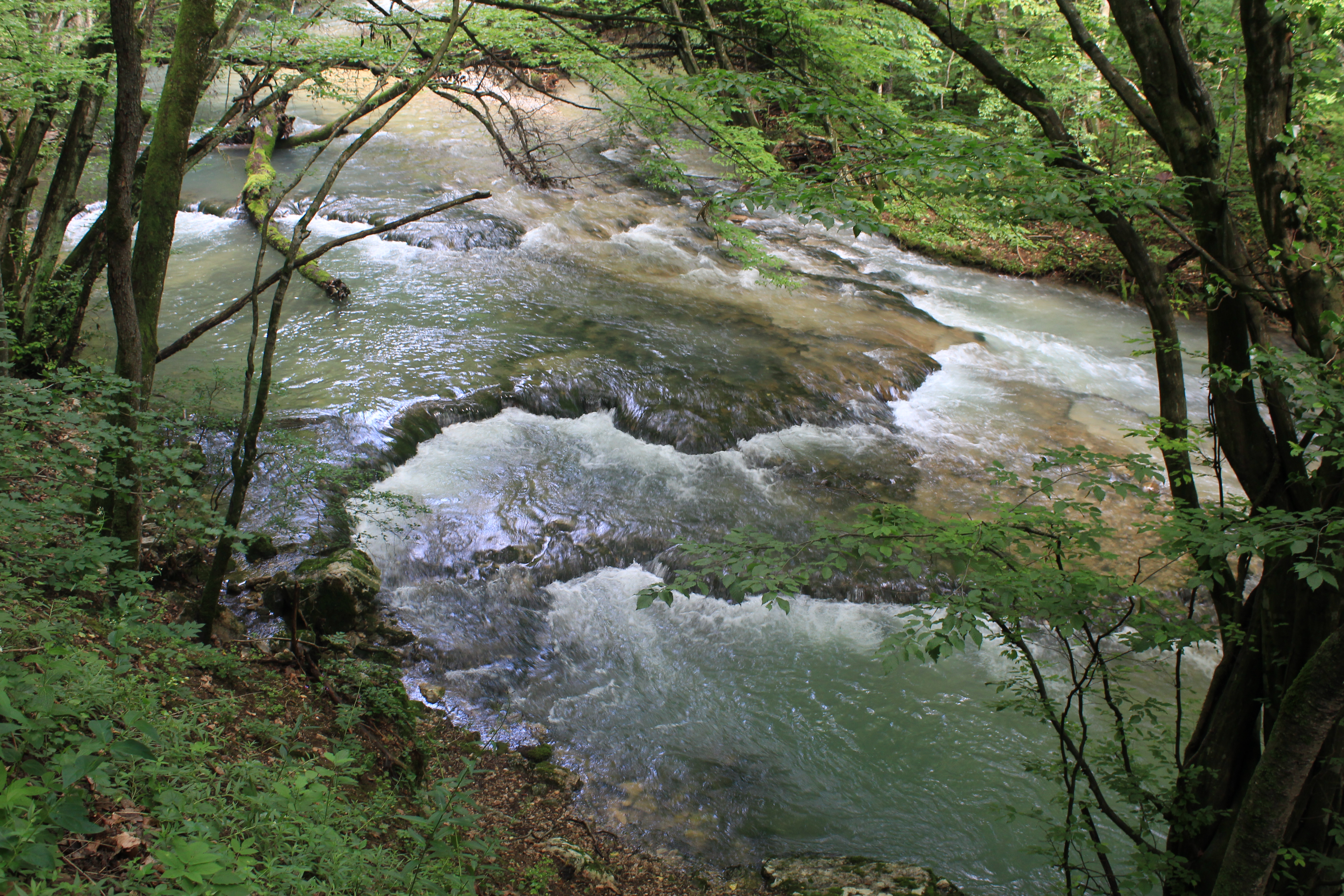
Beușnița (Beu) river bed.

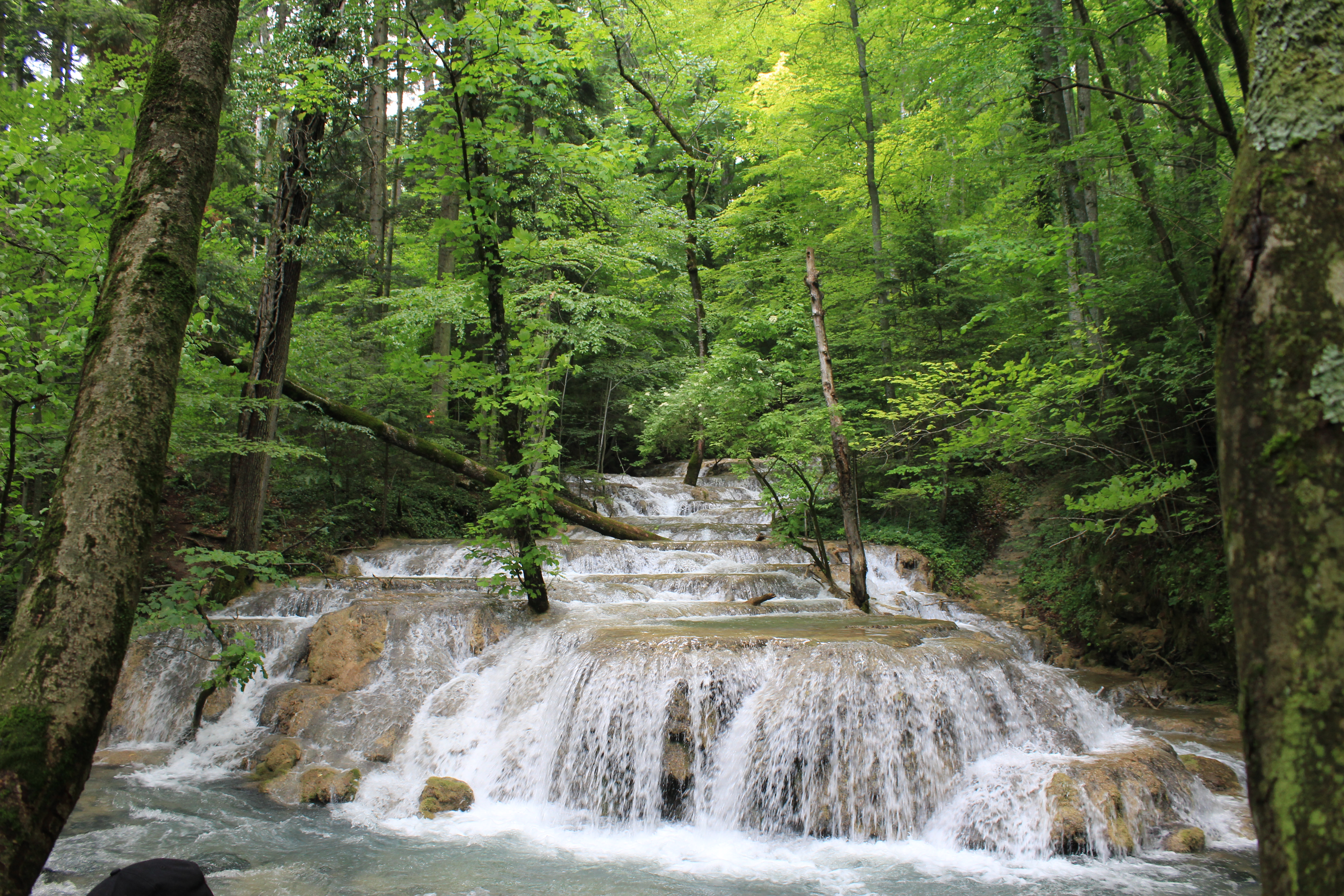
Beușnița (Beu) river bed.

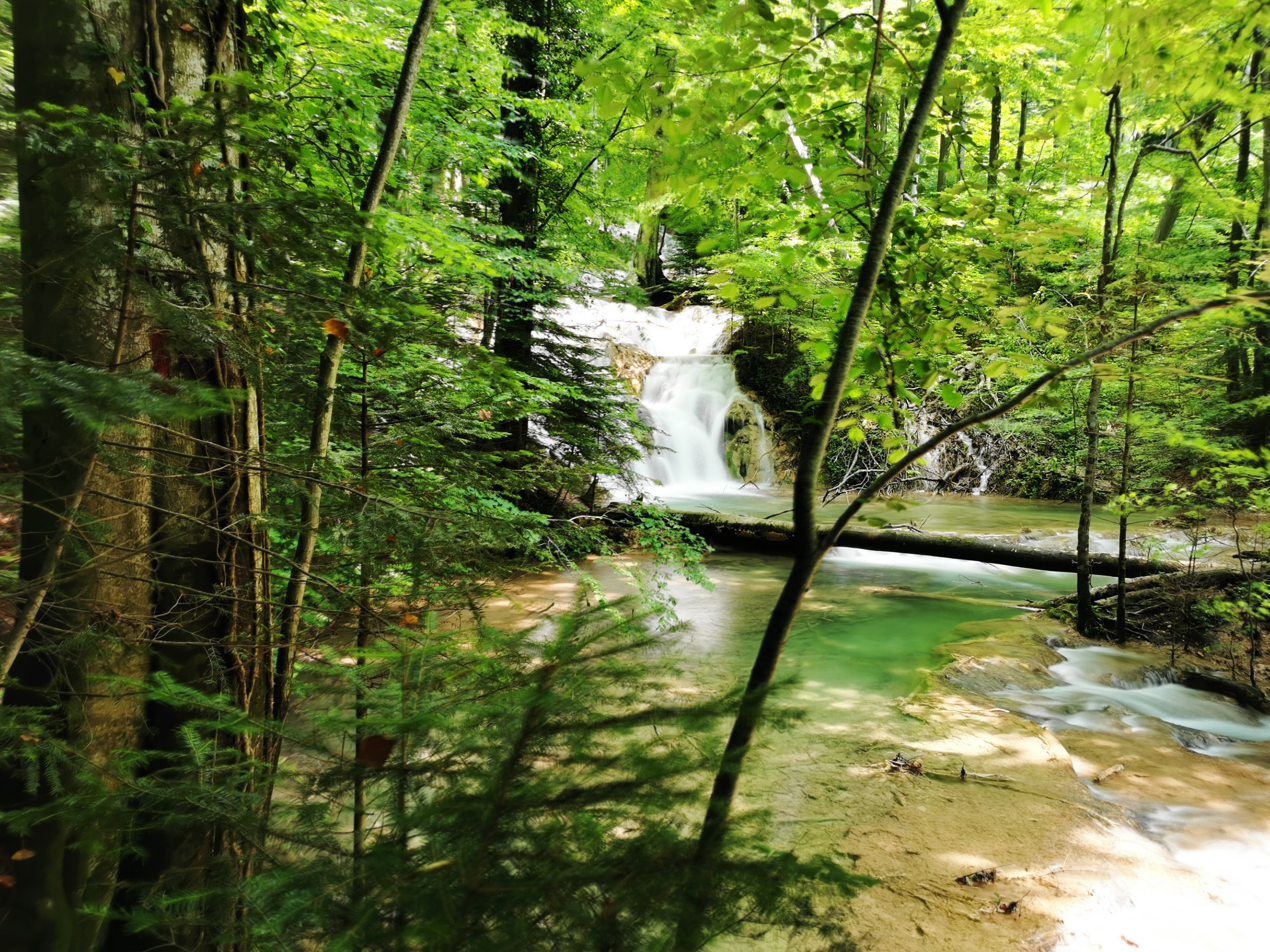
Beușnița (Beu) river bed.

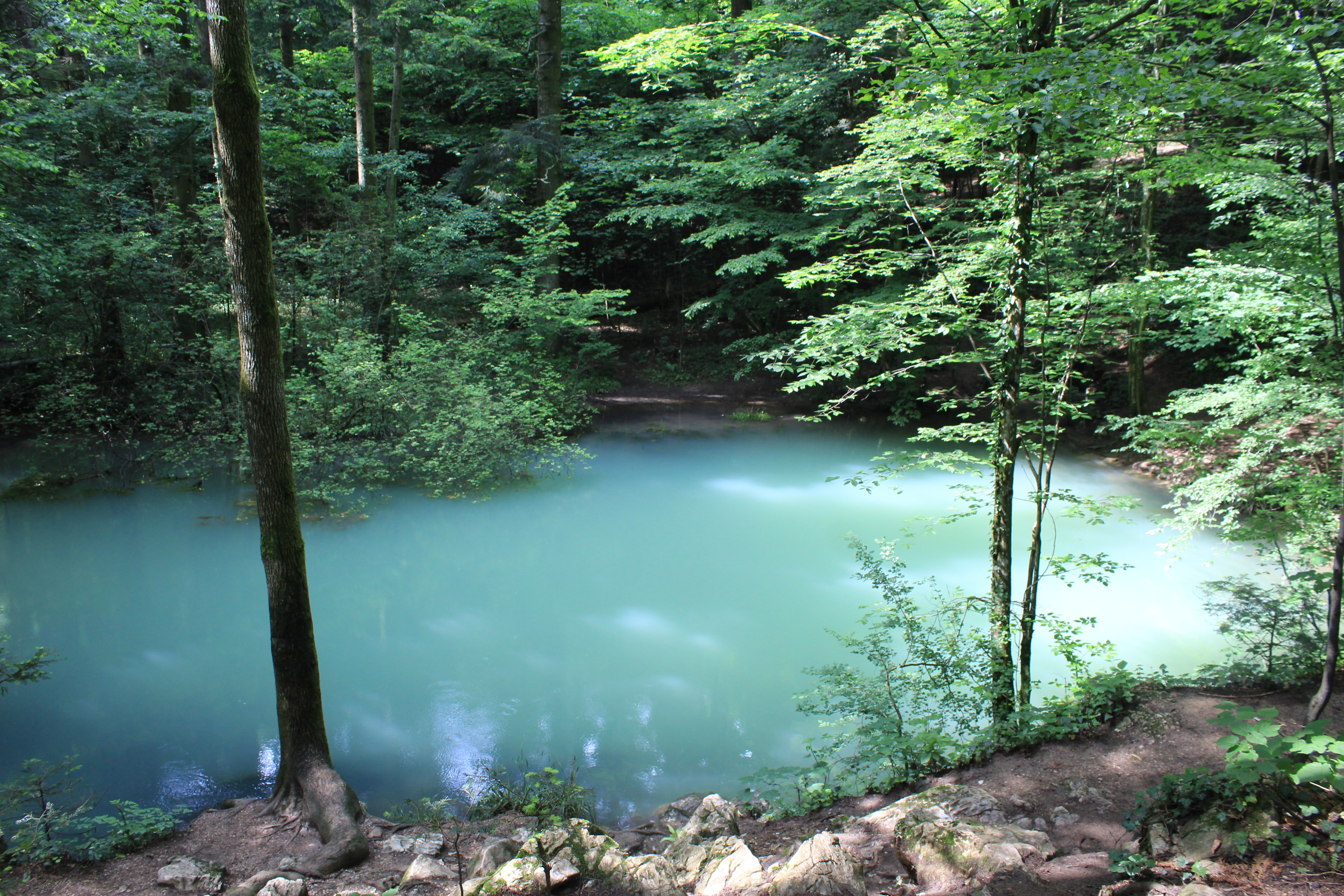
Blue eye lake.

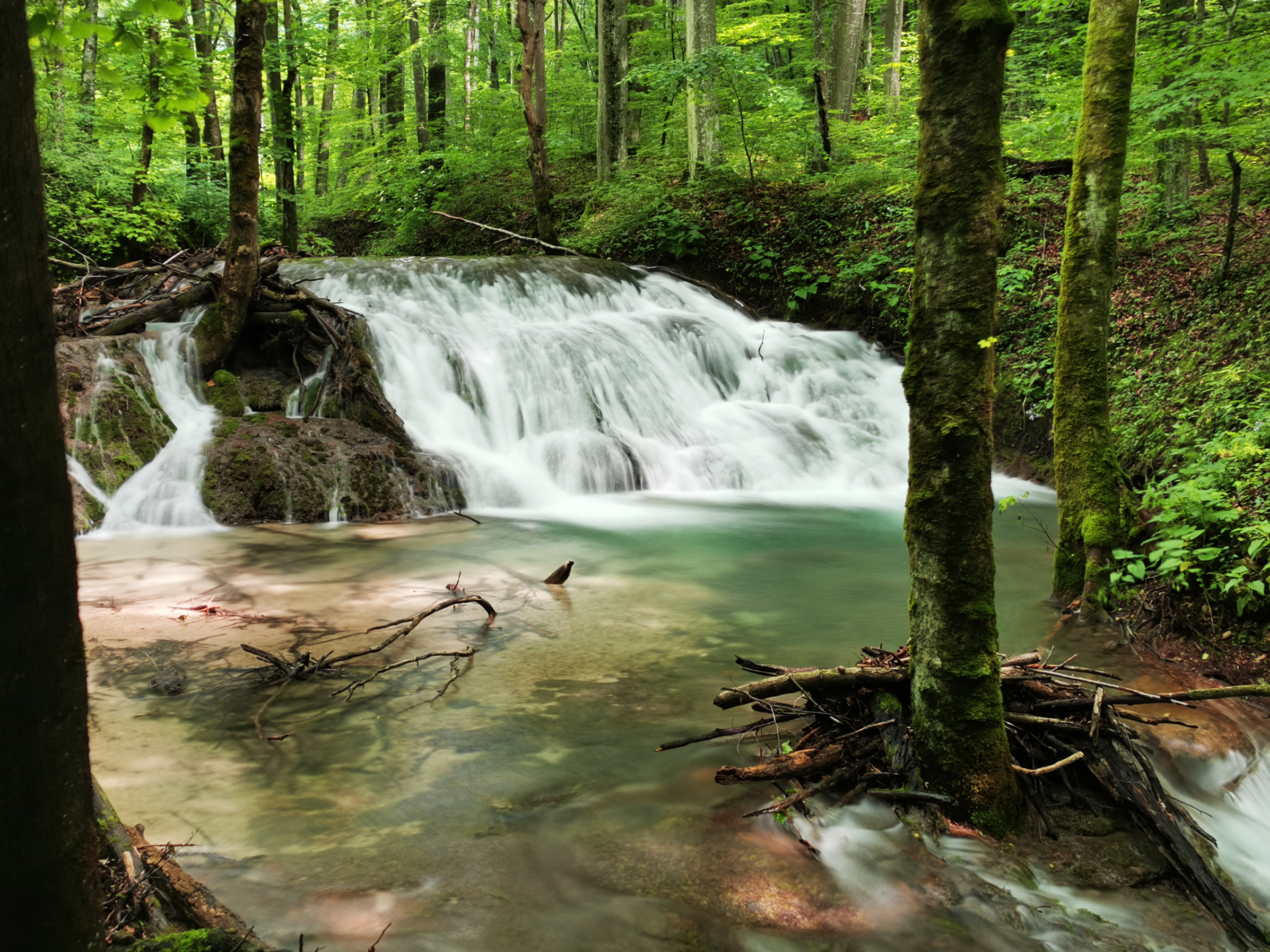
Beușnița (Beu) river bed.

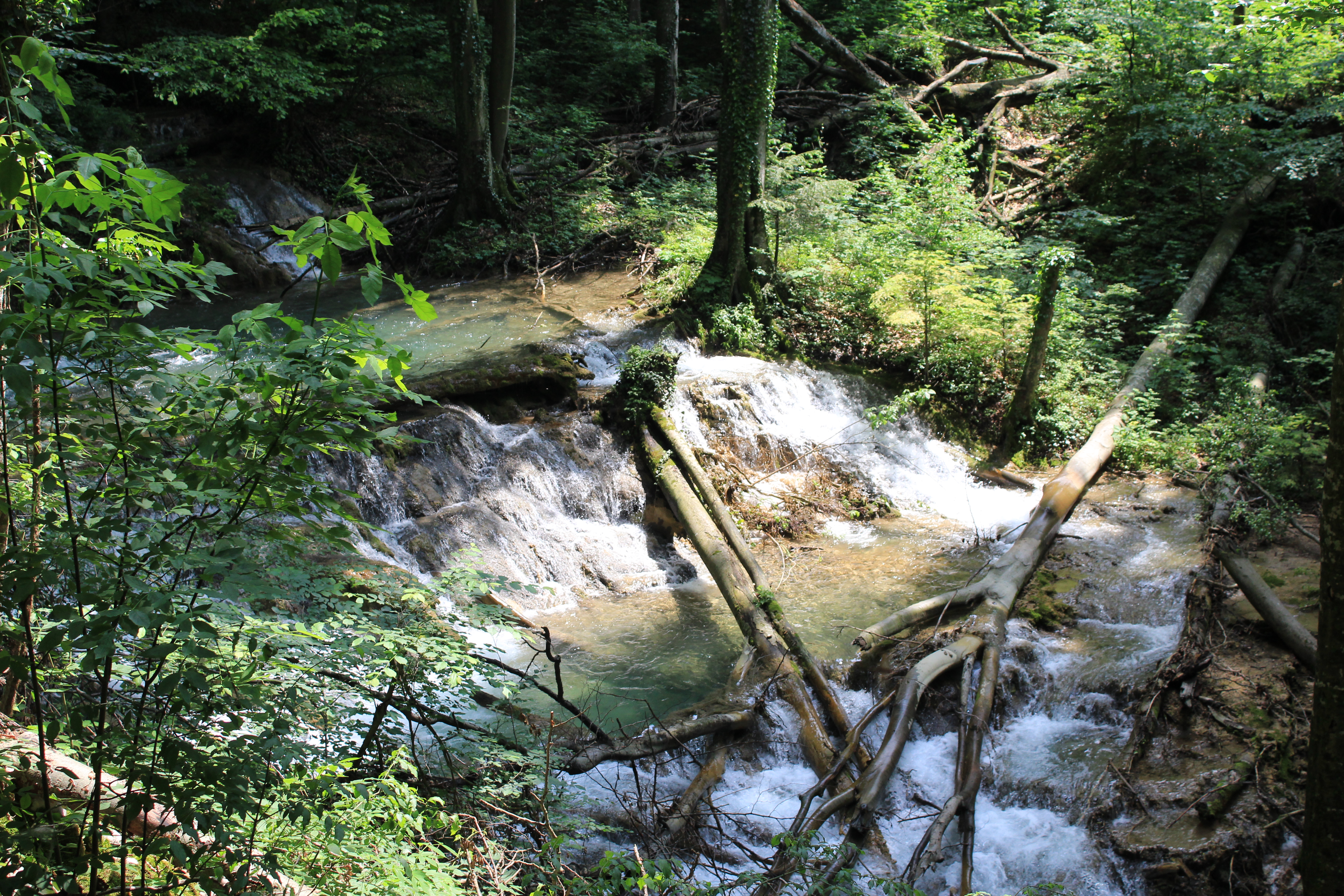
Beușnița (Beu) river bed.

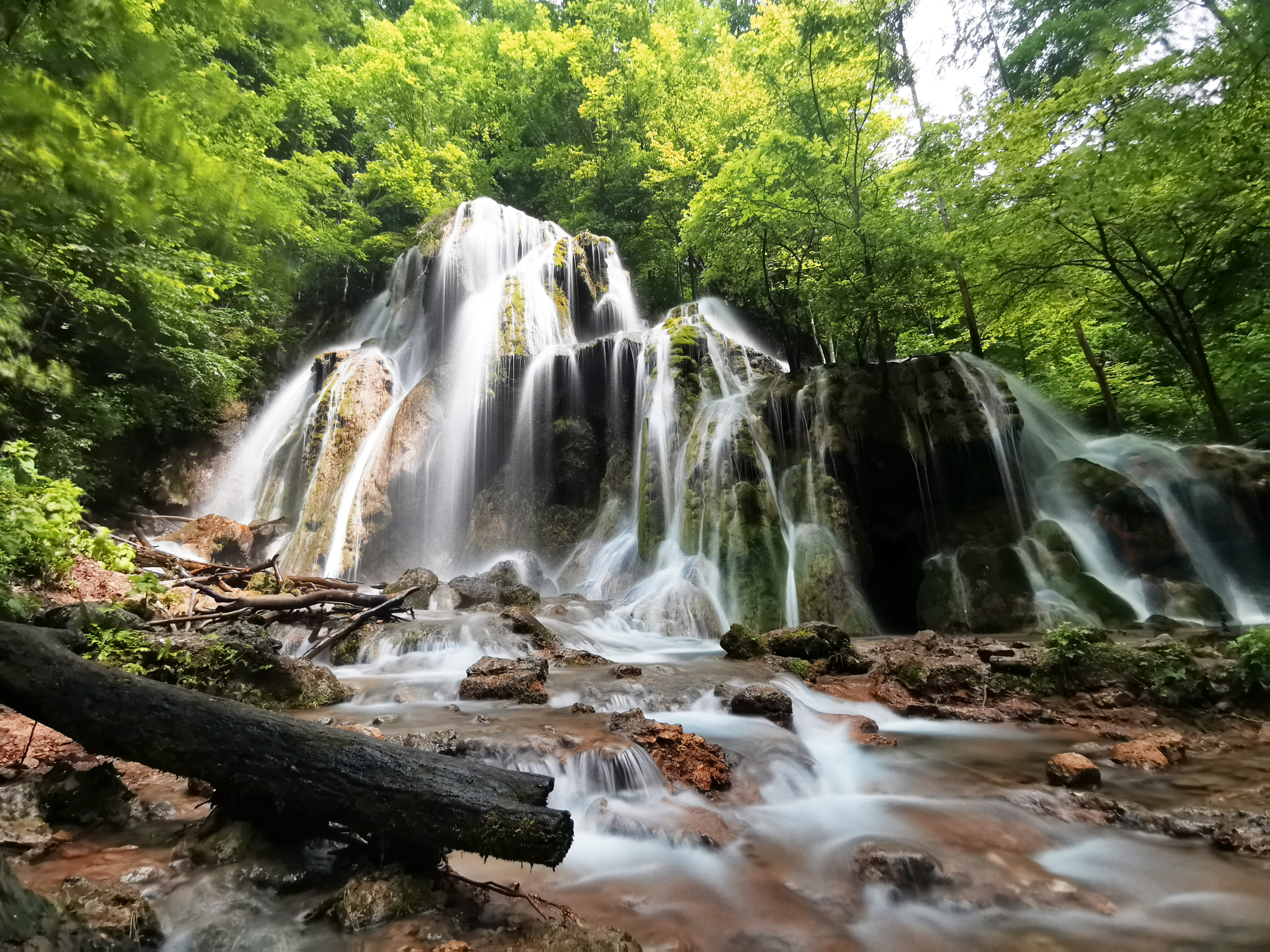
Cascade Beusnita (Beușnița)
