= Nerganița =

- Location within Romania

Location
- Country: Romania
- Counties: Caraș-Severin County

Physical characteristics
- Mouth: Nera
  - coordinates: 45.0579°N 22.0597°E
- Length: 17 km (11 mi)
- Basin size: 26 km^{2} (10 sq mi)

Basin features
- Progression: Nera→ Danube→ Black Sea

The Nerganița is a left tributary of the river Nera in Romania. Its length is 17 km (11 mi) and its basin size is 26 km^{2} (10 sq mi).
