= Lăpușnic (Nera) =

- Location within Romania

Location
- Country: Romania
- Counties: Caraș-Severin County
- Villages: Lăpușnicu Mare

Physical characteristics
- Mouth: Nera
  - coordinates: 44.8809°N 21.9612°E
- Length: 12 km (7.5 mi)
- Basin size: 22 km^{2} (8.5 sq mi)

Basin features
- Progression: Nera→ Danube→ Black Sea

The Lăpușnic is a right tributary of the river Nera in Romania. It discharges into the Nera near Lăpușnicu Mare. Its length is 12 km (7.5 mi) and its basin size is 22 km^{2} (8.5 sq mi).
