= Șopotu =

- Location within Romania

Location
- Country: Romania
- Counties: Caraș-Severin County
- Villages: Șopotu Vechi

Physical characteristics
- Mouth: Nera
  - coordinates: 44.8896°N 21.9723°E
- Length: 15 km (9.3 mi)
- Basin size: 37 km^{2} (14 sq mi)

Basin features
- Progression: Nera→ Danube→ Black Sea

The Șopotu is a left tributary of the river Nera in Romania. It discharges into the Nera near Dalboșeț. Its length is 15 km (9.3 mi) and its basin size is 37 km^{2} (14 sq mi).
