= Bănia (river) =

- Location within Romania

Location
- Country: Romania
- Counties: Caraș-Severin County
- Villages: Bănia

Physical characteristics
- Mouth: Nera
  - coordinates: 44.9149°N 22.0155°E
- Length: 13 km (8.1 mi)
- Basin size: 30 km^{2} (12 sq mi)

Basin features
- Progression: Nera→ Danube→ Black Sea

The Bănia is a left tributary of the river Nera in Romania. It flows into the Nera near Bozovici. Its length is 13 km (8.1 mi) and its basin size is 30 km^{2} (12 sq mi).
