= Coșava (river) =

- Location within Romania

Location
- Country: Romania
- Counties: Caraș-Severin County

Physical characteristics
- Mouth: Nera
  - coordinates: 45°03′22″N 22°03′33″E
- Length: 8 km (5.0 mi)
- Basin size: 25 km^{2} (9.7 sq mi)

Basin features
- Progression: Nera→ Danube→ Black Sea
- Tributaries
  - right: Coșava Mică

The Coșava (in its upper course Coșava Mare) is a right tributary of the river Nera in Romania. Its length is 8 km (5.0 mi) and its basin size is 25 km^{2} (9.7 sq mi). It flows through the Semenic Mountains.
