= Lapus (surname) =

Lapus is a surname. Notable people with the surname include:

- Jeci Lapus (1953–2021), Filipino engineer and politician
- Jesli Lapus (born 1949), Filipino politician
- John Lapus (born 1973), Filipino actor, host, director, and comedian
- Jojo Lapus (1945–2006), Filipino showbiz columnist and screenwriter
