= Rudăria =

- Location within Romania

Location
- Country: Romania
- Counties: Caraș-Severin County
- Villages: Eftimie Murgu

Physical characteristics
- Mouth: Nera
  - location: Downstream of Prilipeț
  - coordinates: 44.9250°N 22.0394°E
- Length: 25 km (16 mi)
- Basin size: 95 km^{2} (37 sq mi)

Basin features
- Progression: Nera→ Danube→ Black Sea

The Rudăria is a left tributary of the river Nera in Romania. It discharges into the Nera near Prilipeț. Its length is 25 km (16 mi) and its basin size is 95 km^{2} (37 sq mi).
