= Miniș (Nera) =

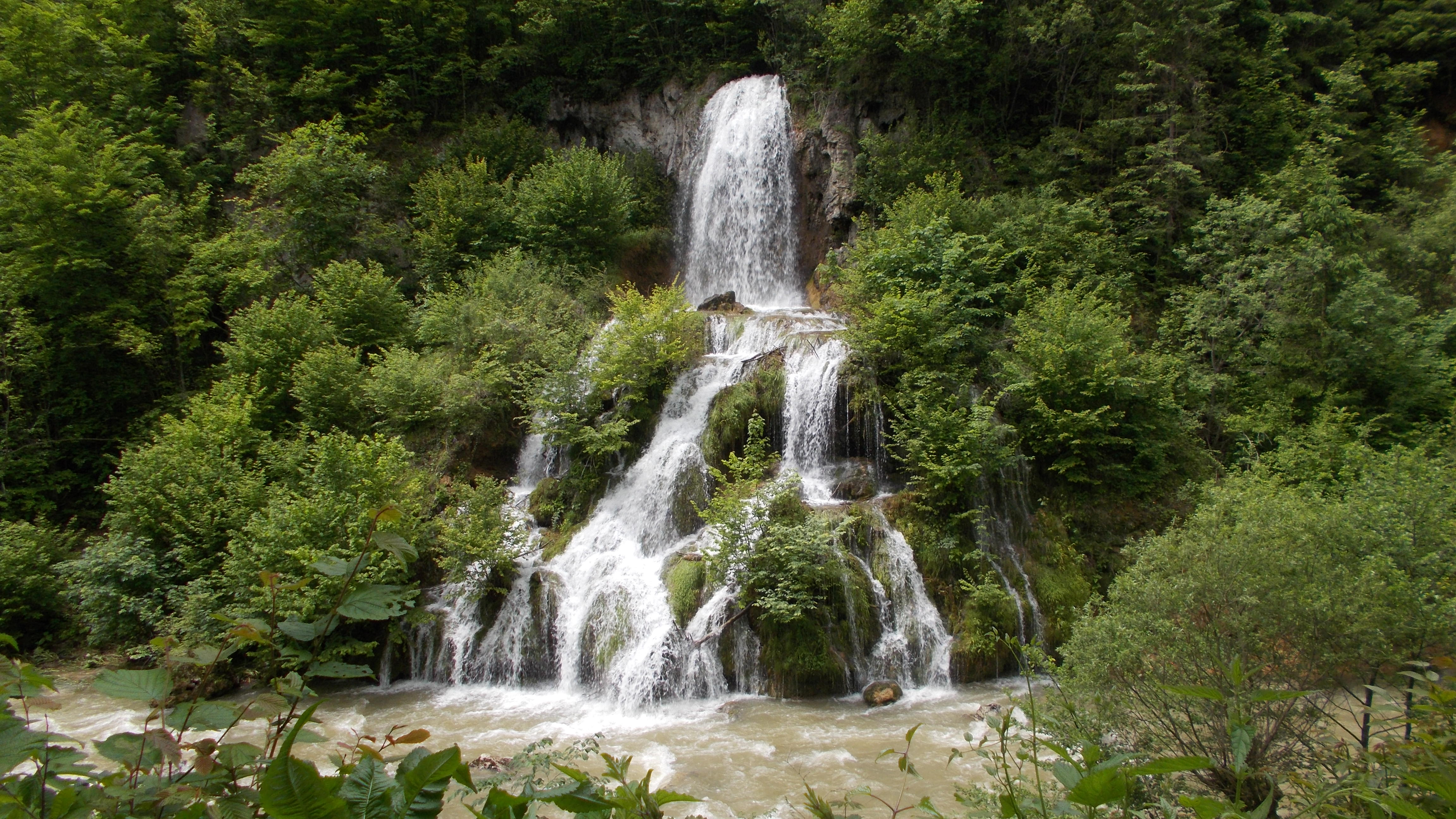

- Location within Romania

Location
- Country: Romania
- Counties: Caraș-Severin County
- Villages: Valea Minișului

Physical characteristics
- Mouth: Nera
  - location: Bozovici
  - coordinates: 44.9128°N 22.0015°E
- Length: 36 km (22 mi)
- Basin size: 250 km^{2} (97 sq mi)

Basin features
- Progression: Nera→ Danube→ Black Sea
- Tributaries
  - left: Poneasca, Tăria
  - right: Lighidia

The Miniș is a right tributary of the river Nera in Romania. It discharges into the Nera in Bozovici. Its length is 36 km (22 mi) and its basin size is 250 km^{2} (97 sq mi).

== Tributaries ==
The following rivers are tributaries to the river Miniș (from source to mouth):

- Left: Ponor, Steier, Predilcova, Mărasca, Ogașu Babei, Ogașu Mare, Poneasca, Zăgraza, Tăria
- Right: Mândrișag, Călugăra, Păuleasca, Golumb, Bozovici, Lighidia
