= Lăpușnicu Mare =

- Commune
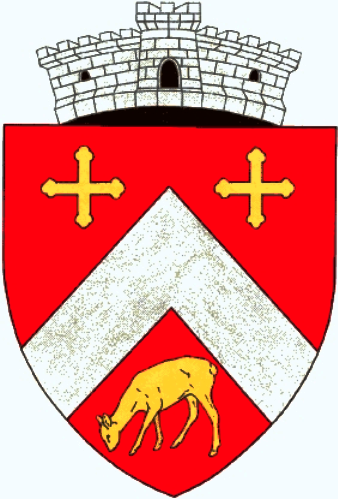
- Coat of arms

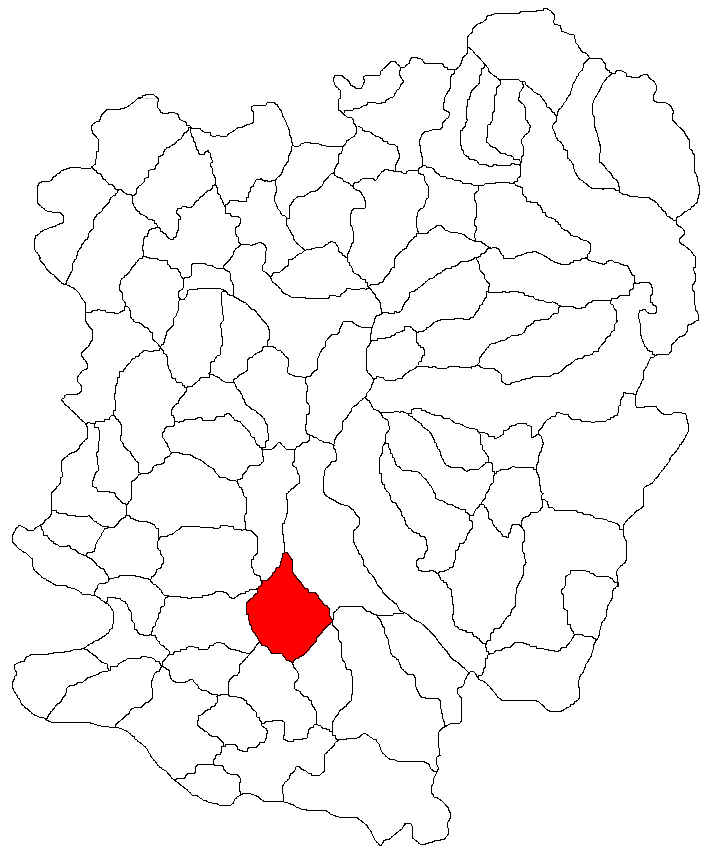
- Location in Caraș-Severin County

- Location in Romania
- Coordinates: 44°55′N 21°57′E
- Country: Romania
- County: Caraș-Severin

Government
  - Mayor (2024–2028): Ion Lala (PSD)
- Area: 123.81 km^{2} (47.80 sq mi)
- Elevation: 255 m (837 ft)
- Population (2021-12-01): 1,427
  - Density: 11.53/km^{2} (29.85/sq mi)
- Time zone: UTC+02:00 (EET)
  - Summer (DST): UTC+03:00 (EEST)
- Postal code: 327245
- Area code: (+40) 02 55
- Vehicle reg.: CS
- Website: primarialapusnicumare.ro

Lăpușnicu Mare (Hungarian: Nagylaposnok) is a commune in Caraș-Severin County, western Romania with a population of 1,427 people as of 2021. It is composed of two villages, Lăpușnicu Mare and Moceriș (Mocsáros).

Historical population
Year	Pop.	±%
1880	3,055	—
1910	3,576	+17.1%
1930	3,337	−6.7%
1977	2,574	−22.9%
2002	1,986	−22.8%
2011	1,647	−17.1%
2021	1,427	−13.4%
Source: Census data
