= Dalboșeț =

- Commune
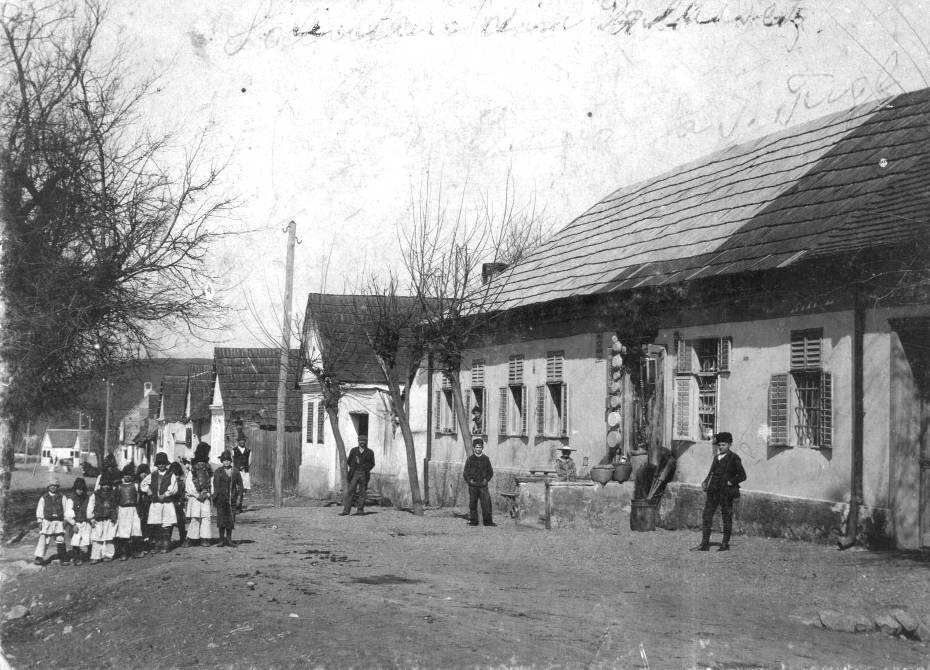
- Street in Dalboșeț in 1900

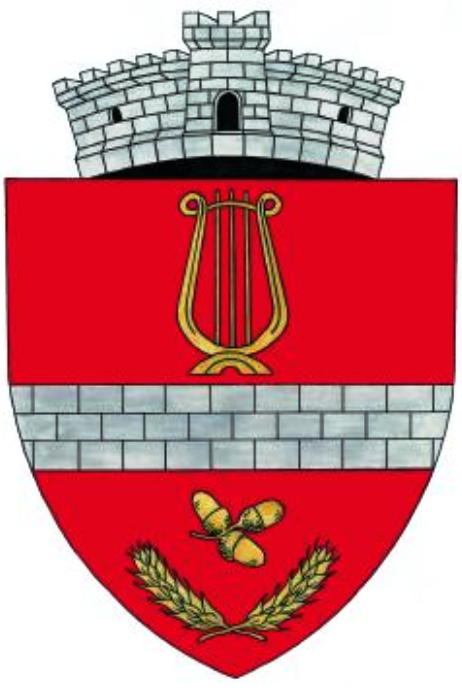
- Coat of arms

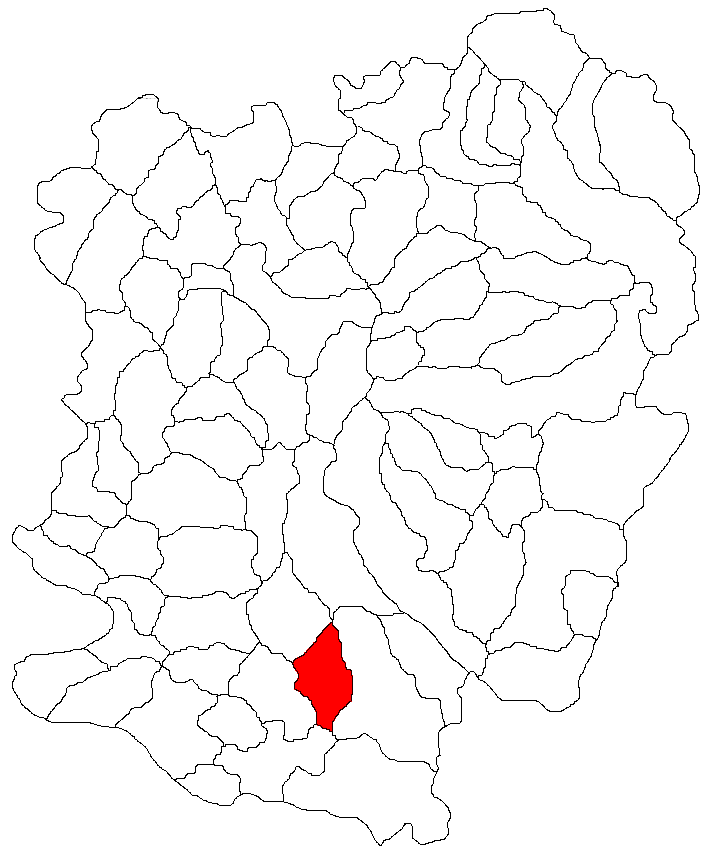
- Location in Caraș-Severin County

- Location in Romania
- Coordinates: 44°52′N 21°57′E
- Country: Romania
- County: Caraș-Severin

Government
  - Mayor (2024–2028): Florin Curița (PSD)
- Area: 77.04 km^{2} (29.75 sq mi)
- Elevation: 247 m (810 ft)
- Population (2021-12-01): 1,364
  - Density: 17.71/km^{2} (45.86/sq mi)
- Time zone: UTC+02:00 (EET)
  - Summer (DST): UTC+03:00 (EEST)
- Postal code: 327165
- Area code: (+40) 02 55
- Vehicle reg.: CS
- Website: www.comunadalboset.ro

Dalboșeț (Hungarian: Dalbosec) is a commune in Caraș-Severin County, western Romania with a population of 1,364 people as of 2021. It is composed of seven villages: Bârz, Boina, Boinița, Dalboșeț, Prislop, Reșița Mică (Kisresica), and Șopotu Vechi (Ósopot).

Șopotu Vechi has many old water mills built on the Șopotu river, a tributary of the Nera river. It was there that Iosif Traian Bădescu, a future bishop of Caransebeș, was born in 1858.

Historical population
Year	Pop.	±%
1880	3,435	—
1910	3,899	+13.5%
1930	3,540	−9.2%
1977	2,379	−32.8%
2002	1,919	−19.3%
2011	1,650	−14.0%
2021	1,364	−17.3%
Source: Census data
