= Nera (Danube) =

River in Romania and Serbia

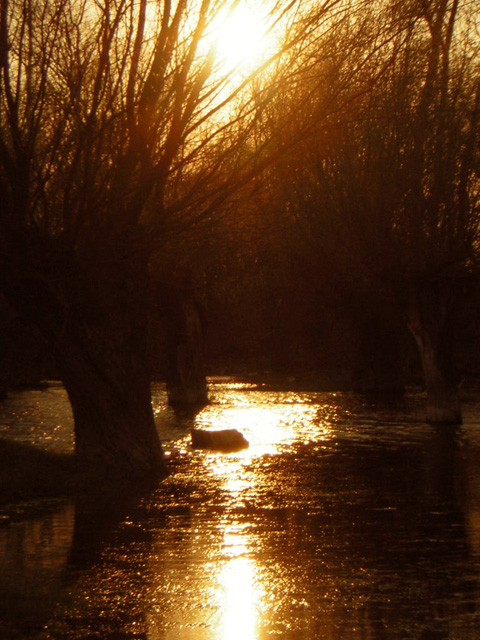
- The river Nera near Bela Crkva

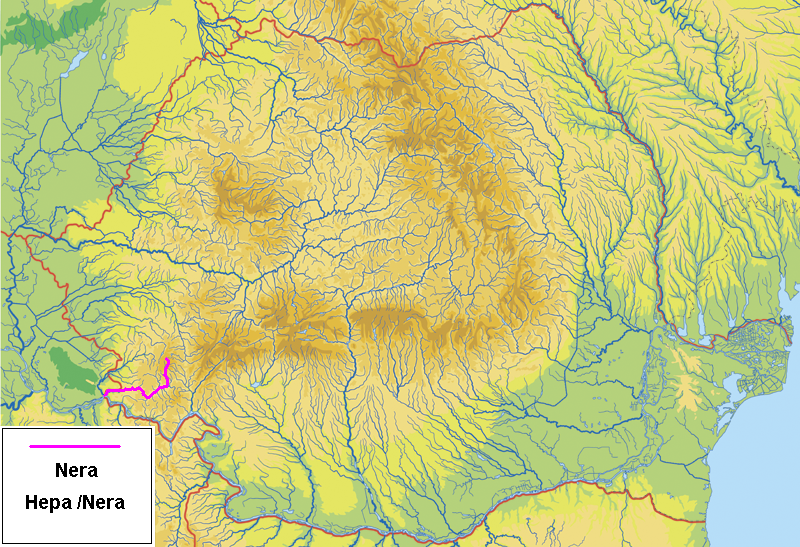
- Native name: Nera (Romanian); Нера / Nera (Serbian)

Location
- Countries: Romania; Serbia
- County / Province: Caraș-Severin; Vojvodina
- Towns: Bela Crkva

Physical characteristics
- Source: Semenic Mountains
- Mouth: Danube
  - location: near Banatska Palanka, Romanian-Serbian border
  - coordinates: 44°49′48″N 21°21′12″E
- Length: 143 km (89 mi)
- Basin size: 1,380 km^{2} (530 sq mi)

Basin features
- Progression: Danube→ Black Sea
- Tributaries
  - left: Prigor
  - right: Miniș

The Nera (Romanian and Serbian Latin; Serbian Cyrillic: Нера, Hungarian: Néra) is a 124-kilometre-long (77-mile) river running through Romania and Serbia. It is a left tributary of the Danube, which it joins near Banatska Palanka. Its length is 143 km (89 mi) and its basin size is 1,380 km^{2} (530 sq mi) (Black Sea drainage basin). The Nera is not navigable.

== Romania ==
The Nera rises in the Semenic mountains, the easternmost part of the Banat region, south of the city of Reșița, in the Caraș-Severin County of Romania. Its source is near the mountain resort Semenic, from where it flows south. Its uppermost part, upstream from the confluence with the Nerganița, is also called Nergana. Reaching the village of Borlovenii Vechi, the Nera turns southwest, flowing between the Semenic and Banat Mountains. In this section, the Nera receives its left tributary, the Rudăria, and passes next to many villages (Prilipeț, Dalboșeț, Moceriș), until it reaches Șopotu-Nou, where it sharply turns to the northwest, still curving around the Semenic mountains. In the following section of about 26 km, the Nera is cutting its way between the Aninei Mountains and Locvei Mountains, creating one of the most spectacular and longest gorges in Romania. The 36.758 ha Nera Gorge-Beușnița National Park natural reserve is nested in this wild section of the river.

Coming out of the mountains, it passes next to the villages of Sasca Română, Sasca Montana, Slatina Nera, Bogodinti and Naidăș, at which point it becomes the border between Romania and Serbia for the remaining 27 kilometres (17 mi).

== Border river ==
In the border section, the Nera flows through the Bela Crkva Basin (Serbian: Белоцркванска котлина / Belocrkvanska kotlina), and settlements on the Romanian side include Lescovița, Zlatița and Socol, while on the Serbian side there is only one village on the river itself, Kusić, with several settlements in the vicinity of the river: Kaluđerovo, the town of Bela Crkva, Vračev Gaj and Banatska Palanka. At Vračev Gaj the river turns south and empties into the Danube near the village of Stara Palanka.

In the final section, the Nera is 20 to 40 metres (66 to 131 ft) wide with varying depths, and as the riverbed is made mostly of gravel, it spills over in a series of limans, filled with murky waters. The mouth itself is a popular fishing spot.

== Lake Đerdap ==
After the filling of the artificial Lake Đerdap, as a result of the Iron Gate I Hydroelectric Power Station which was finished in 1972, the mouth of the river into the Danube was flooded. In order to allow the optimal electricity production, the water level of the Nera at the mouth should not go below 68 m (223 ft), while it must not exceed it if the flooding of the banks is to be avoided. Since the mid-1990s, there have been significant problems in fixing the river's level, as the process is costly and complicated. In 2018, representatives of Romania and Serbia signed an agreement to solve the problem.

== Settlements located near the river ==
In Romania: Prigor, Bozovici, Dalboșeț, Șopotu Nou, Sasca Montană, Naidăș, Socol

In Serbia: Kusić, Bela Crkva, Vračev Gaj, Banatska Palanka, Stara Palanka

== Tributaries ==
The most important tributaries of the Nera are the Miniș and the Prigor. The following are tributaries of the Nera (from source to mouth):

Left: Nerganița, Prigor, Rudăria, Bănia, Gârbovăț, Șopot, Bârz, Boinița, Răchita, Șușara, Micoș, Pârloagele

Right: Coșava, Hielișag, Pătășel, Miniș, Agriș, Lăpușnic, Moceriș, Ducin, Valea Rea, Beu, Năidășel

Other, minor tributaries in the Nera Gorge area are, from source to mouth: Oreștica, Ogașu Rogozului, Ogașu Babei, Ogașu Mare, Bresnic, Arsa, Meliugel, Ogașu cu Raci, Haimeliug, Ogașu Porcului, Ogașu Alunilor, Radovanu, Ulmu Mare, Padina Seacă, Ogașu Porcariului, Lindina, Padina Bașchii, Fântâna Seacă.

== See also ==
- List of rivers of Romania
- List of rivers of Serbia
