= Șopotu Nou =

- Commune
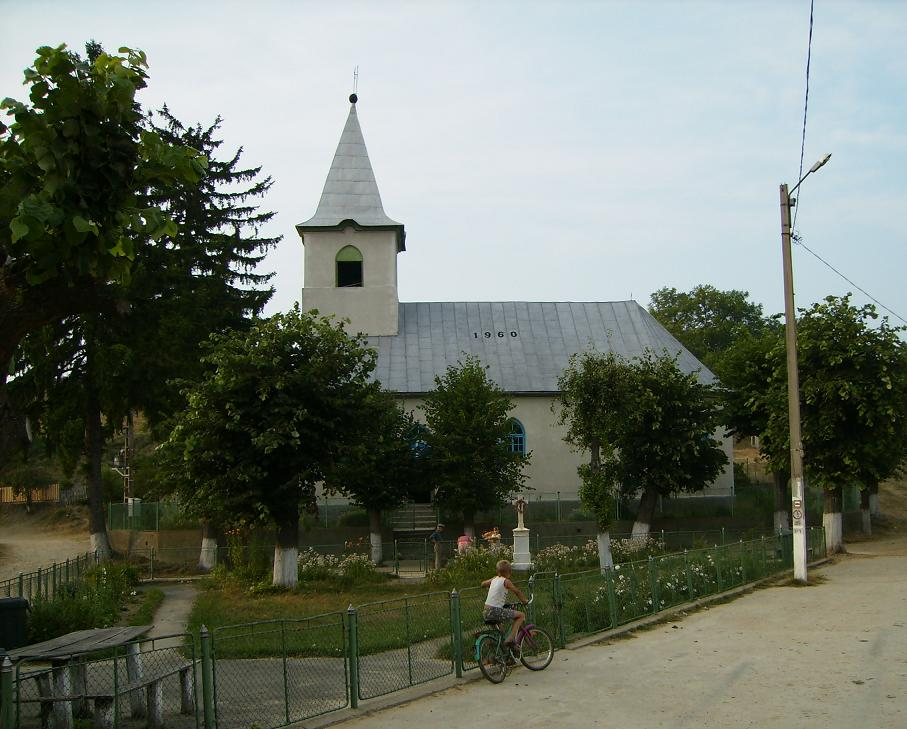
- Catholic church in Ravensca

- Coat of arms

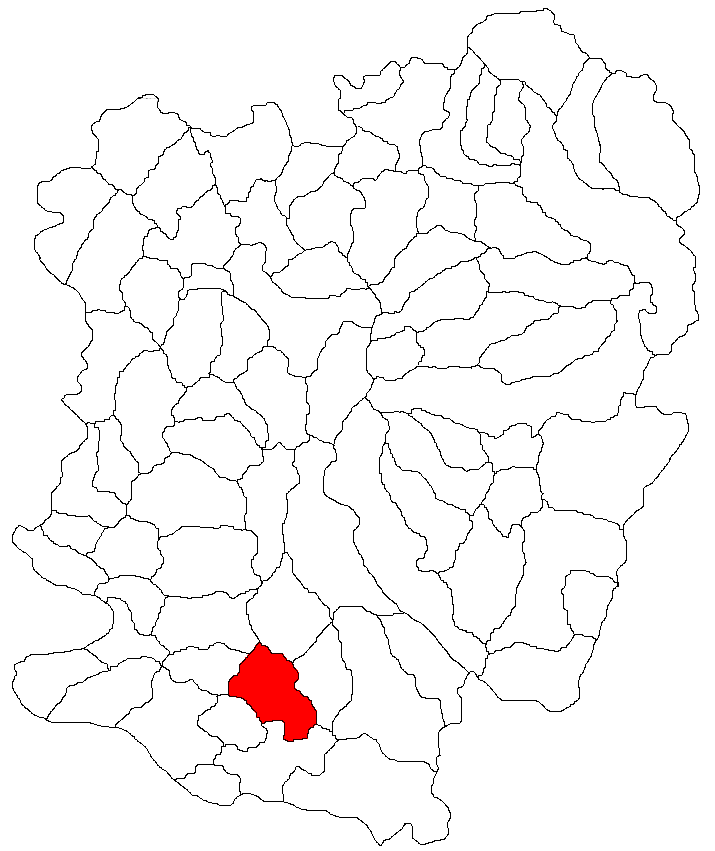
- Location in Caraș-Severin County

- Location in Romania
- Coordinates: 44°51′N 21°52′E
- Country: Romania
- County: Caraș-Severin

Government
  - Mayor (2024–2028): Iosif Brebu (PNL)
- Area: 83.36 km^{2} (32.19 sq mi)
- Elevation: 219 m (719 ft)
- Population (2021-12-01): 896
  - Density: 10.7/km^{2} (27.8/sq mi)
- Time zone: UTC+02:00 (EET)
  - Summer (DST): UTC+03:00 (EEST)
- Postal code: 327370
- Area code: (+40) 02 55
- Vehicle reg.: CS
- Website: primaria-sopotunou.ro

Șopotu Nou (Hungarian: Újsopot, German: Neuschopot) is a commune in Caraș-Severin County, western Romania with a population of 896 as of 2021. It is composed of ten villages: Cârșa Roșie (Kersia Rosie), Driștie, Poienile Boinei, Ravensca (Czech: Rovensko; Hungarian: Ravenszka, from 1911 to 1918 Almásróna), Răchita (Rekettyő), Stăncilova (Sztancsilovapuszta), Șopotu Nou, Urcu (Urku), Valea Răchitei (Rakittapuszta), and Valea Roșie (Rosievölgy).

== Villages ==
=== Ravensca ===
Ravensca is one of six Czech-inhabited villages in Romania's Banat. It is located on a hill at an altitude of c. 750 m (2,460 ft) above sea level and about 7 km (4.3 mi) southeast of Șopotu Nou village. Of the six Czech villages in the Banat, Ravensca is located at the highest altitude and the best-preserved Czech language is spoken there. As a result of its considerable isolation, the speech is not overly influenced by Romanian and Serbo-Croatian. Ravensca is linked with the closest Czech villages of Gârnic (15 km away) and Bigăr (30 km away) by being decorated with the red mark designated by the Czech Tourists' Club. Local inhabitants make their living mainly in agriculture, electricity having been introduced as late as 1994.

Ravensca has the most scenic location of the Banat's Czech villages, making it a favourite destination of romantic travelers. However, life on the mountain range is very hard, particularly in winter, when the village is almost completely cut off from the rest of the world. This is perhaps the reason for the rapid decrease in residents.

The village was founded in 1827. In 1922, a Roman Catholic church of the Immaculate Conception of the Virgin Mary was built, being consecrated to St. Martin. In 1925 the village had 586 inhabitants; by 1991 the population had fallen to 235 (230 of whom were Czechs), dropping to slightly over 120 in 2002 and to 69 in 2021.
