= Sasca Montană =

- Commune
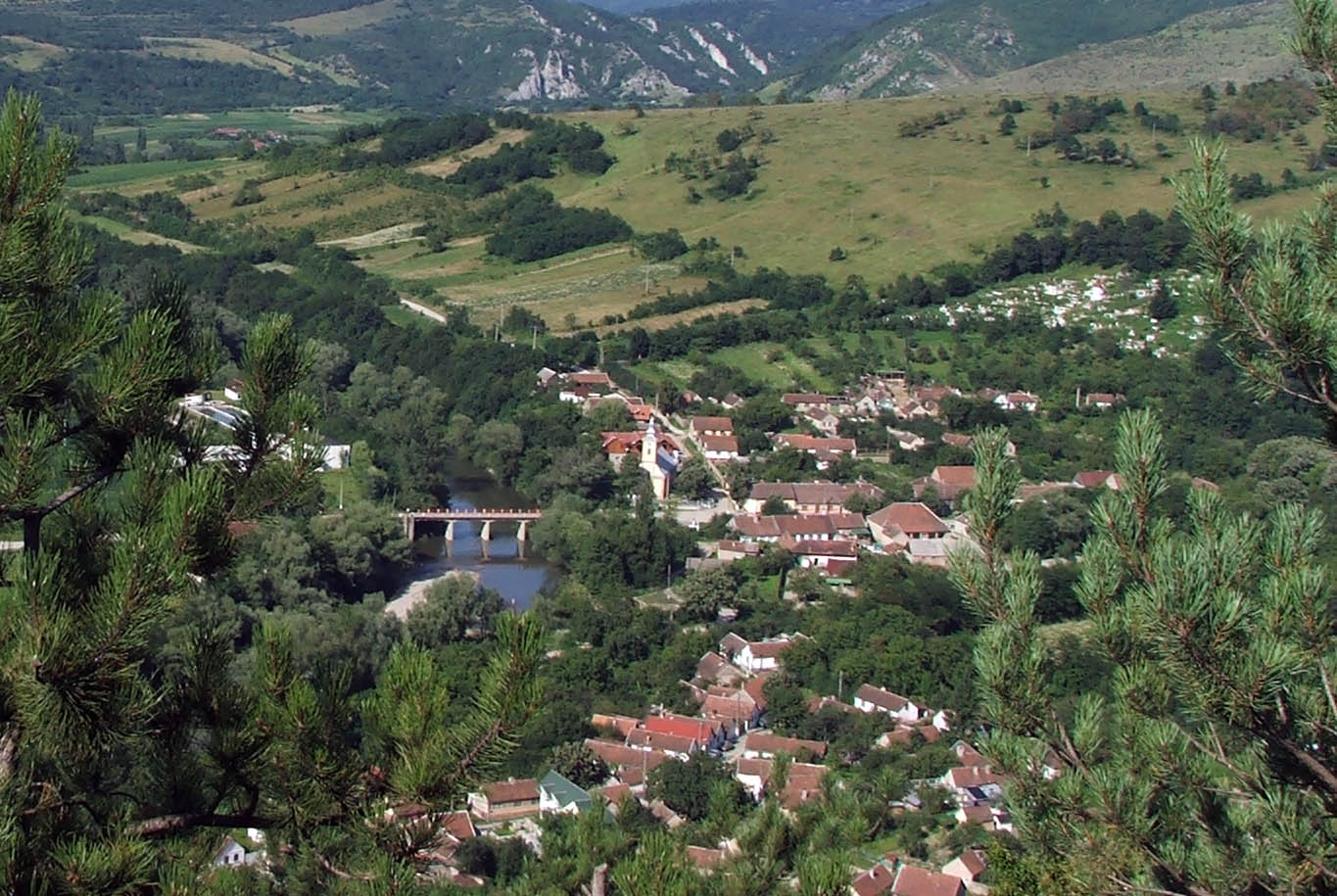
- Aerial view of Sasca Montană

- Coat of arms

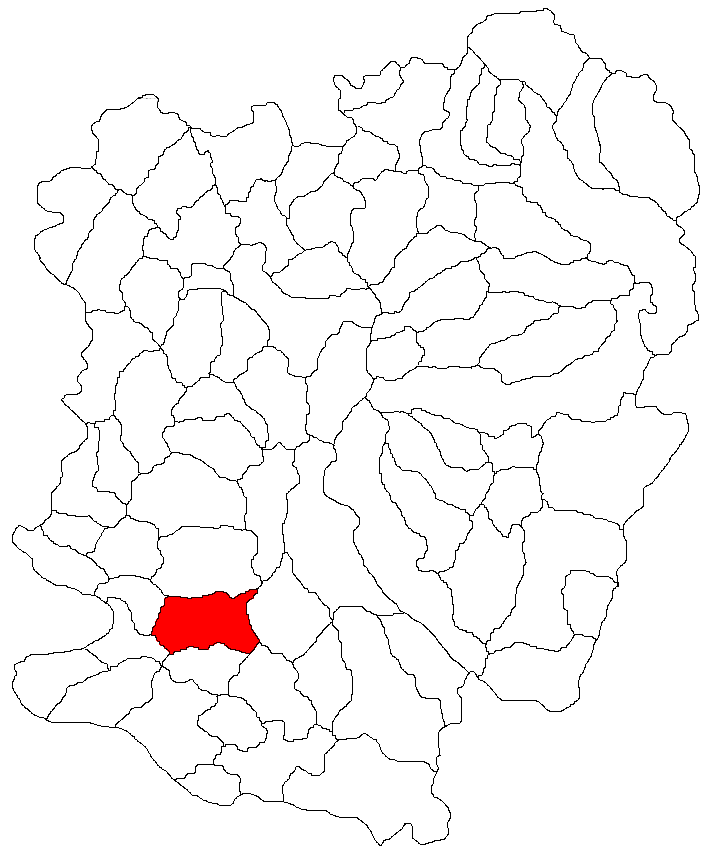
- Location in Caraș-Severin County

- Location in Romania
- Coordinates: 44°53′N 21°42′E
- Country: Romania
- County: Caraș-Severin

Government
  - Mayor (2024–2028): Ion Poplicean (PSD)
- Area: 128.98 km^{2} (49.80 sq mi)
- Elevation: 150 m (490 ft)
- Population (2021-12-01): 1,292
  - Density: 10.02/km^{2} (25.94/sq mi)
- Time zone: UTC+02:00 (EET)
  - Summer (DST): UTC+03:00 (EEST)
- Postal code: 327330
- Area code: (+40) 02 55
- Vehicle reg.: CS
- Website: uatsascamontana.ro

Sasca Montană (Hungarian: Szászkabánya) is a commune in Caraș-Severin County, western Romania with a population of 1,292 people as of 2021. It is composed of five villages: Bogodinț (Bogorfalva), Potoc (Potok), Sasca Montană, Sasca Română (Szászka), and Slatina-Nera (Néraszlatina).

== Notable people ==
- Alexander Louis Arch (1894–1979), American soldier
