= Đorđe Maletić =

Serbian writer

Đorđe Maletić Ђорђе Малетић
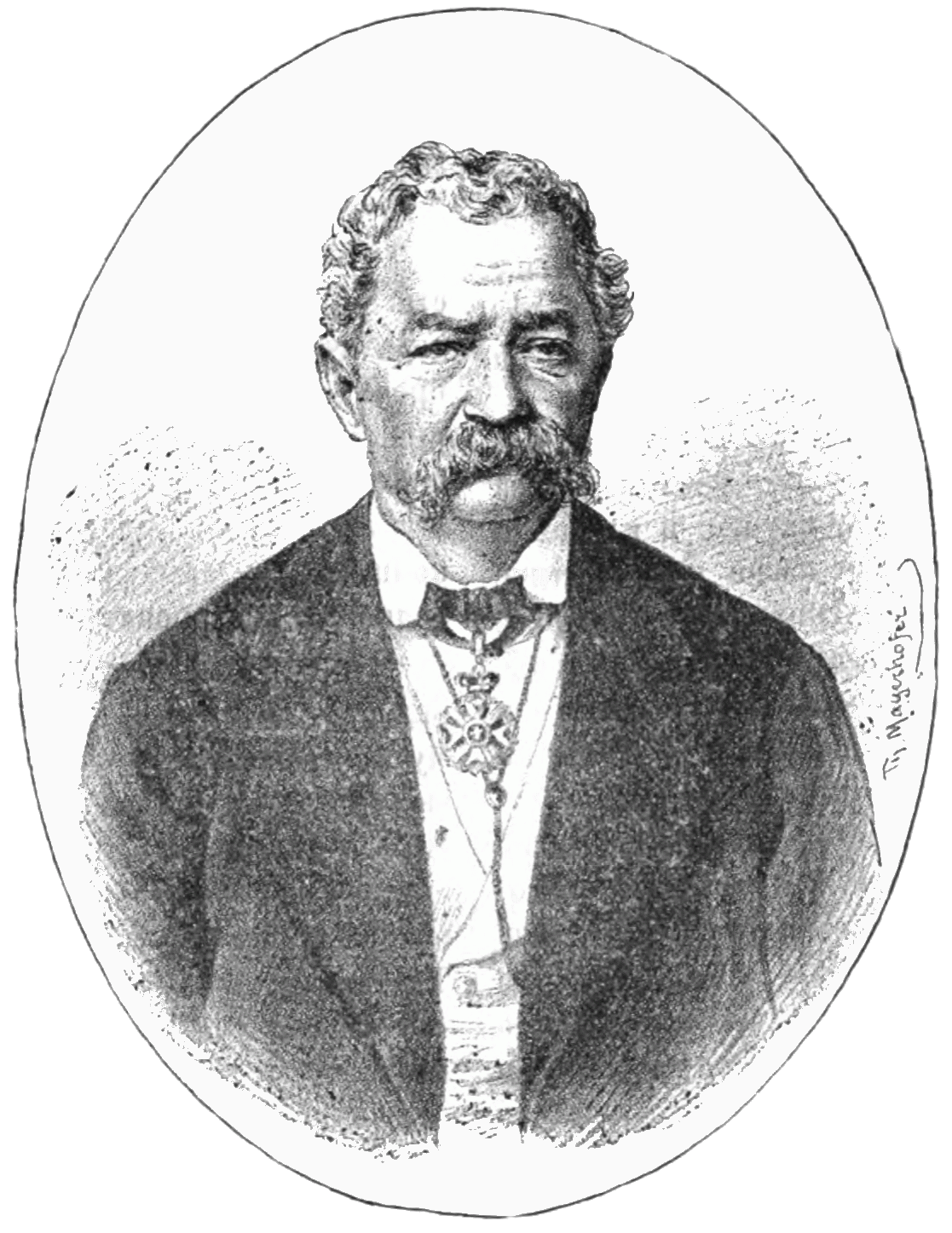
- Born: 1 March 1816; Jasenovo, Austrian Empire (Modern-day Serbia)
- Died: 13 January 1888 (aged 71); Belgrade, Kingdom of Serbia (Modern-day Serbia)
- Writing career
- Language: Serbian

Đorđe Maletić (Serbian: Ђорђе Малетић; 1 March 1816 – 13 January 1888) was a Serbian poet, translator, aesthetic, and theoretician.

== Biography ==
Đorđe Maletić was born at the Serbian Military Frontier of the Austrian Empire in a town Jasenovo in the Banat region (formerly known as Raška/Rascia) on the first of March 1816 (Julian Calendar). In his place of birth and in Bela Crkva he received his early education in Serbian and in German, and in the gymnasia (high schools) of Oraovci and Sremski Karlovci under teachers who inspired him with an enduring love of contemporary literature, as we see from his translation of Gotthold Ephraim Lessing's "Nathan the Wise" into Serbian, published when he had reached middle age. He went to Segedin as a student of philosophy and natural sciences. It appears that Đorđe Maletić's studies were governed by a distinct interest. That was his aesthetical and artistic interest, which was developed under the care of Vuk Stefanović Karadžić who often corresponded with him. The other person who influenced Maletić was Jovan Hadžić (1799-1869). To the former, he owes his appreciation for the great circle of ideas which had been diffused by the teachings of Hegel, Fichte, and Schelling, while to the other latter an equal admiration for his poetical inspiration and philological polemics with Vuk. Each of these influences, which early in life must have been familiar to him, tempered and modified the other.

He was uncertain at first which profession to choose and vacillated between diplomatic service, teaching, and literature. In 1839 Maletić, who had mingled little in party politics, was appointed by Prince Miloš Obrenović assistant to the Court Secretary at Kragujevac. The following year he was appointed City Hall secretary of Belgrade. He cared little for such work, regarding it simply as a distasteful means of livelihood, yet his experiments in writing did not encourage him to trust this for support. After a change in the dynasties in 1842, he was dismissed and went to live in Zemun. There he became a professor at a Lycee and an editor of a magazine called Podunav, from 1856 to 1858. He was appointed a director of a gymnasium in 1858 in Belgrade, where Maletić and Vladimir Vujić, a colleague, co-edited the Rodoljubac Magazine.

Đorđe Maletić first began writing poems in 1837 and having them successfully published in various magazines and almanacs. In 1844 Maletić collected his poems in two volumes entitled "Tripobratima," which almost immediately secured a wide circle of readers. To almost every new edition he added some fresh poems, all influenced by contemporary German models. Literary critic Jovan Skerlić wrote:

".... ostaje djak nemačkih pesnika ćiji je često i rado prevodio...."

He remained a student of German poets who he (Maletić) often translated.

He wrote two dramatic works -- " Apoteoza Velikom Karadjordju and Peodnica srbske slobode, ili srbski aiduci -- the former published in 1850 in Belgrade, the latter in 1863 in Karlovci. These, however, are unimportant in comparison with his Tri pobratima (The Three Bloodbrothers) and Pesme (Poems) in two volumes. As a lyric poet, Maletić must be classed with the poets and writers of the rationalist period who soon joined the romantic school, for, like them, he found in the First Serbian Uprising of 1804, led by Karadjordje, the subject which appealed most strongly to his imagination. Maletić wrote manly poems in defense of freedom, and in the diplomatic service, he played a distinguished part as one of the most vigorous and consistent of staff members.

Đorđe Maletić was not only a poet and a diplomat he was also an ardent student of the history of literature. In 1854 he published Teorija poezije (Theory of Poetry) and the following year Retorika (Rhetoric). He loved the theatre as well. Maletić was also the author of Gracu za istoriju srpskog narodnog pozorišta.

Serbian composer Kornelije Stanković composed music for Đorđe Maletić's drama "Precursor of Serbian Liberty or Serbian Highwaymen" (1856).

== Works ==
- Vučićevci i Knjaževci ili Prevara iz ljubavi
- Istorijski razvitak gimnazije Beogradske od njenog postanka do danas (1868)
- Posmrtna slava kneza Mihaila
- Percursor of Serbian Liberty or Serbian Highwaymen (drama, 1856)

== Sources ==
- Jovan Skerlić, Istorija nove srpske knjizevnosti (Belgrade, 1914, 1921) page 192-194.
