= Ljubomir Klerić =

Serbian inventor

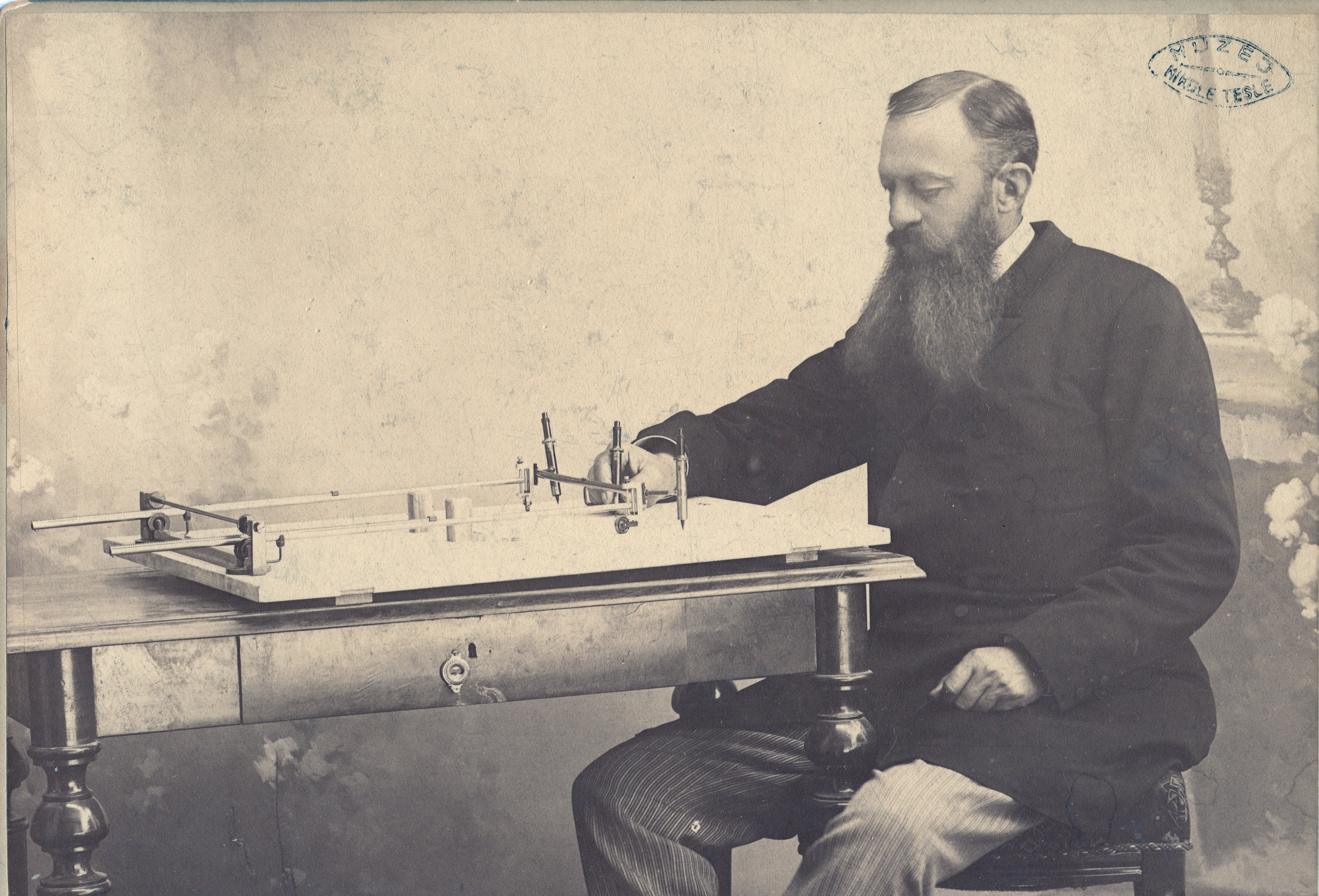
- Ljubomir Klerić
- Born: 29 June 1844; Subotica, Serbia
- Died: 21 January 1910 (aged 65); Belgrade, Serbia

Ljubomir Klerić (29 June 1844 – 21 January 1910) was a Serbian mining engineer, mathematician, inventor, professor of mechanics and Minister of education and the economy.

== Education ==
Klerić was born on 29 June 1844 in Subotica. After primary school, he moved with his family to Belgrade, the capital of Serbia. In 1862, he finished First men's Belgrade Secondary School and enrolled at the Faculty of Engineering of the Velika škola in Belgrade, where he completed two years of study.

His interest for technology and great success in studying it "with a pronounced tendency towards mining" were more than enough to qualify for a "state scholarship" to be sent to study mining at the Mining Academy in Freiberg. For the winter semester in 1867/68 he moved to the Zurich Polytechnic, where he studied "mechanical engineering" intensively. The following year he returned to Freiburg, where he completed his study of geology. In 1869, upon approval of the Ministry of Education of Serbia, Klerić went to Berlin's Mining Academy, where he studied specialized courses in mining for another year. After that, he spent time on practical work and observation of German mines in Westphalia, Saxony and Upper Silesia, as well as the mine in Příbram (in the modern day Czech Republic).

== Mining work ==
After graduation in 1870, Klerić returned to Belgrade with a broad knowledge of mining, engineering, mineralogy, mechanics and mathematics. He immediately got a job in the state service, but unfortunately this was as a scribe in the mining department at the Ministry of Finance not in the mining profession. Before going abroad in 1872, Klerić constructed a new drill for deep soundings. He patented the invention in Germany and France. This invention was in widespread use for a short time. After that, he was employed as a mining engineer in the Dutch company "Albert & CO, drilling in Westphalia.

In 1873, Klerić returned to Serbia, with a fellow engineer Hoffman. They immediately set to work examining a mine of magnetite on the Vencac in Arandjelovac. Unfortunately, they soon found out that there were not enough minerals for mass exploitation. Then, the company "Albert & Co" sent him to Oran in Africa, to investigate an iron mine. He went to Africa where he conducted successful research, however, the company did not agree a price with the owner of the land. Klerić returned to Belgrade in June 1875, worked for a while on geological exploration, and the same year became a professor of the Mechanical Engineering Department of Belgrade College.

== Inventions and patents ==
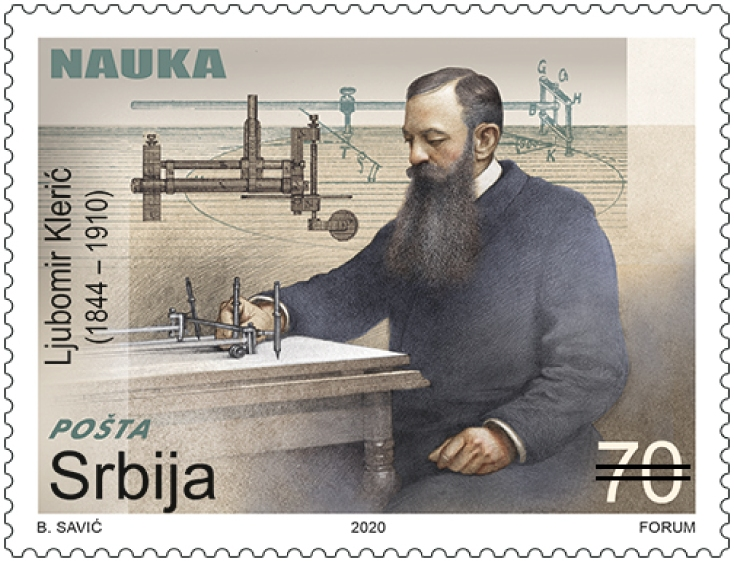
Klerić on a 2020 stamp of Serbia

In 1892, Ljubomir Klerić patented several appliances in mining (scale, deep well drill, rock breaker ...). He invented a polar pantograph (1875), a tractograph (1892), a second-line curve drawing device (1899). With the traction engine, he mechanically conceived irrational, transcendental numbers π and e. He studied "telemetry" and on that occasion he constructed, examined and created a new type of telemetry and set it "to measure the distance in the battlefield".

Klerić studied "telemetry" after which he constructed, tested and developed a new type of telemetry "to measure distances on the battlefield," and decided to give these instruments to the government. He created the following mathematical tools:

- a new typewriter, which he named the polypantograph (1875);
- a new compass which he named tractoriograph, or logarithmograph (1892);
- a construction of measuring instruments, curvometre and logarithmometre (1899);
- a treatise on Kinematic determination of elliptical integrals.

== Government service ==
He served as minister of education and ecclesiastical affairs for a few months between the autumn of 1894 and June 1895. As minister of the national economy between December 1896 and October 1897, he introduced laws designed to increase industrialization, agricultural production, quality control and the general level of technical knowledge among the people of Serbia. He also took care of technical education and protection of health of people, animals, and plants in the territory of Serbia. Ljubomir Klerić was awarded the Order of Leopold by the Belgian monarch. He died as a state counsellor on 21 January 1910 in Belgrade, Serbia.

Government offices
Preceded by Mihailo K. Đorđević	Minister of Education of Serbia; 1894–1895	Succeeded by Ljubomir Kovačević
