= Kusić, Bela Crkva =

Kusić Кусић
- Village (Selo)
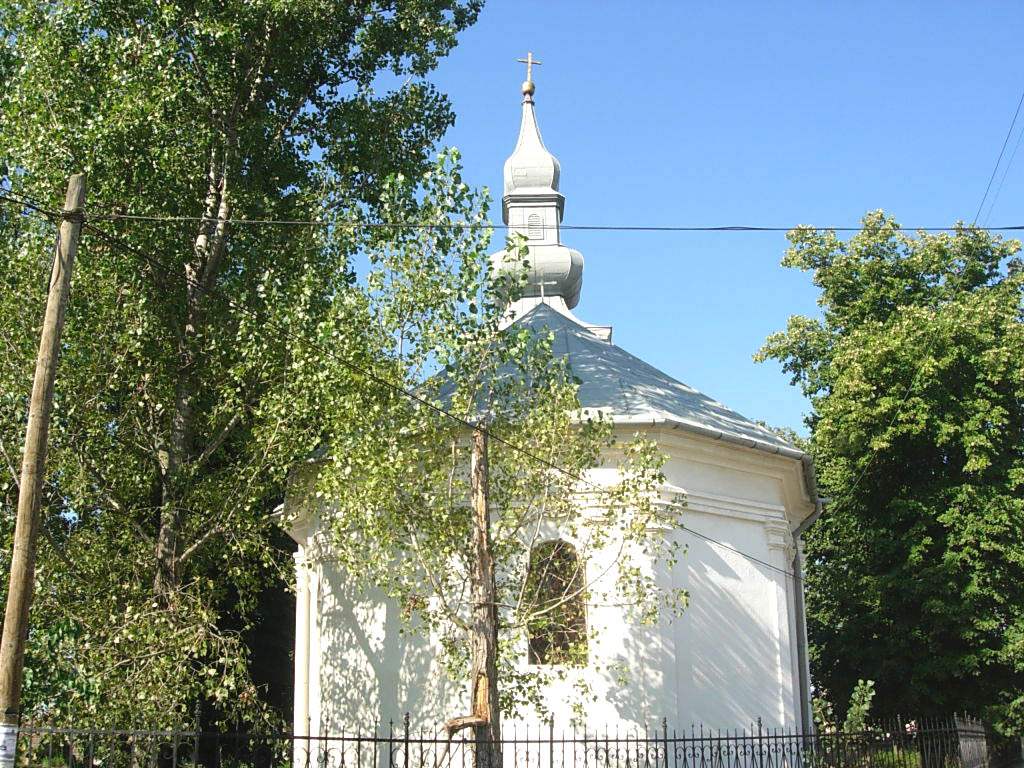
- The Orthodox church

- Location of Kusić within Serbia Kusić (Serbia) Kusić (Europe)
- Coordinates: 44°52′20″N 21°28′26″E
- Country: Serbia
- Province: Vojvodina
- District: South Banat
- Municipality: Bela Crkva
- Elevation: 84 m (276 ft)

Population (2002)
  - Kusić: 1,361
- Time zone: UTC+1 (CET)
  - Summer (DST): UTC+2 (CEST)
- Postal code: 26349
- Area code: +381(0)13
- Car plates: VŠ

Kusić (Serbian Cyrillic: Кусић) is a village in Serbia. It is situated in the Bela Crkva municipality, in the South Banat District, Vojvodina province. The village has a Serb ethnic majority and a population of 1,047 (2022 census).

== Historical population ==
- 1961: 1,912
- 1971: 1,808
- 1981: 1,622
- 1991: 1,560

== See also ==
- List of places in Serbia
- List of cities, towns and villages in Vojvodina
