= Kajtasovo =

Kajtasovo Кајтасово
- Village (Selo)
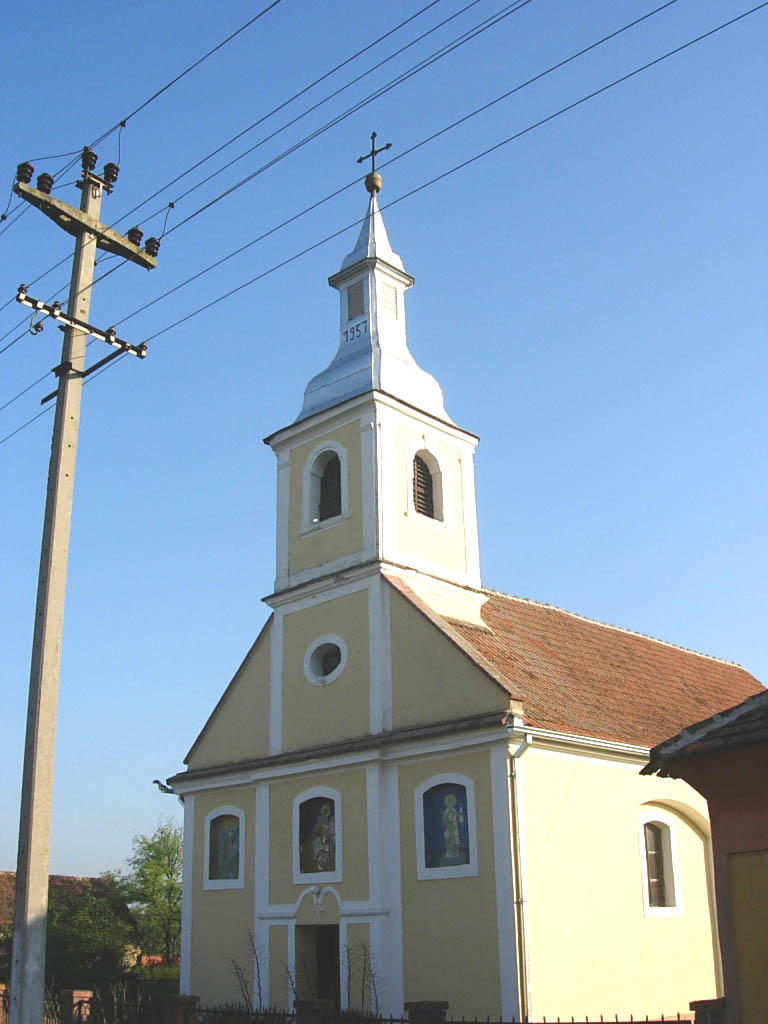
- The Orthodox Church

- Location of Kajtasovo within Serbia Kajtasovo (Serbia) Kajtasovo (Europe)
- Coordinates: 44°52′35″N 21°15′18″E
- Country: Serbia
- Province: Vojvodina
- District: South Banat
- Municipality: Bela Crkva
- Elevation: 66 m (217 ft)

Population (2002)
  - Kajtasovo: 287
- Time zone: UTC+1 (CET)
  - Summer (DST): UTC+2 (CEST)
- Postal code: 26329
- Area code: +381(0)13
- Car plates: VŠ

Kajtasovo (Serbian Cyrillic: Кајтасово) is a village in Serbia. It is situated in the Bela Crkva municipality, in the South Banat District, Vojvodina province. The village has a Serb ethnic majority (88.15%) and a population of 287 people (2002 census).

== Historical population ==
- 1961: 494
- 1971: 459
- 1981: 424
- 1991: 350
- 2002: 287

== See also ==
- List of places in Serbia
- List of cities, towns and villages in Vojvodina
