= Češko Selo =

Češko Selo Чешко Село (Serbian) Česká ves (Czech)
- Village (Selo)
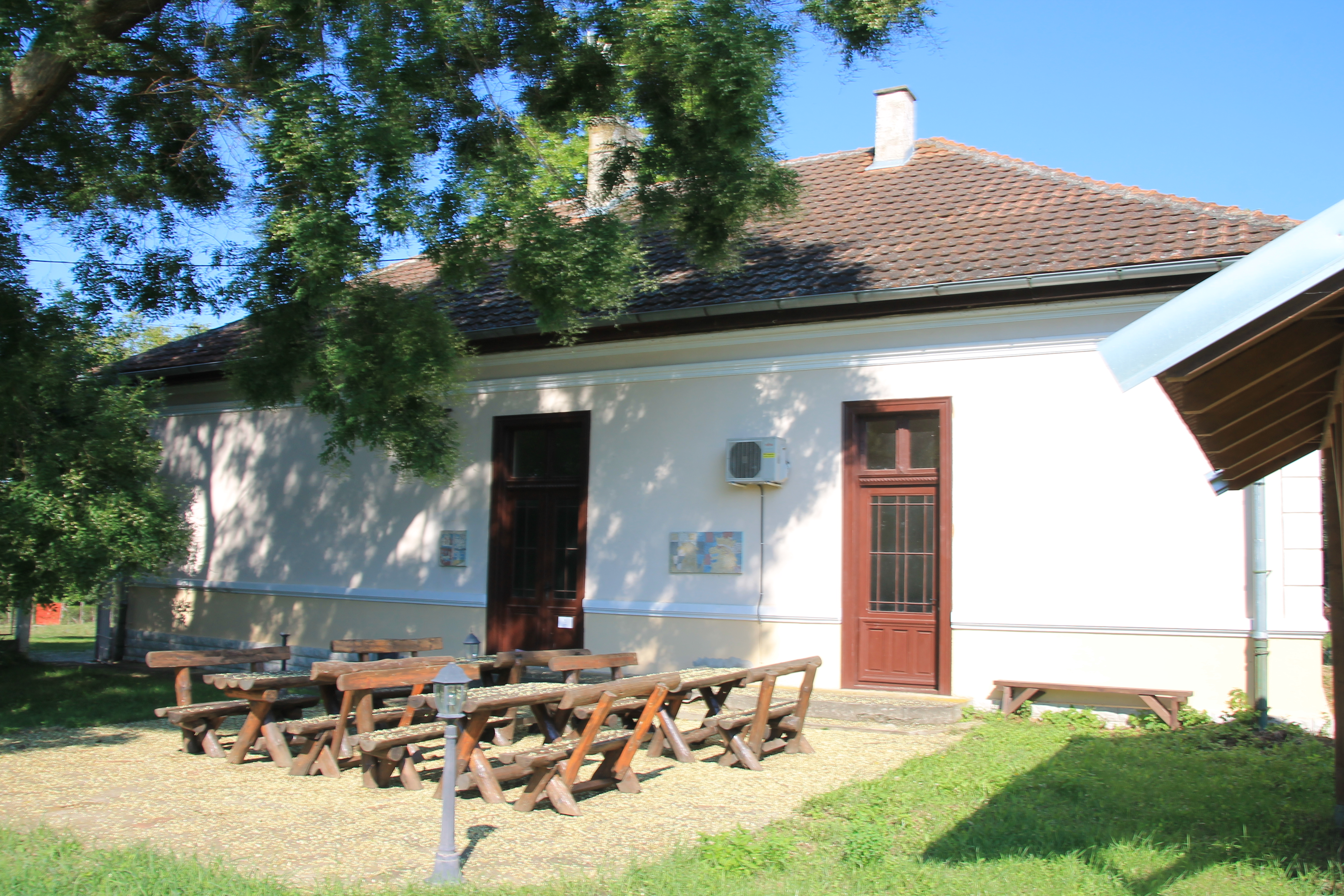
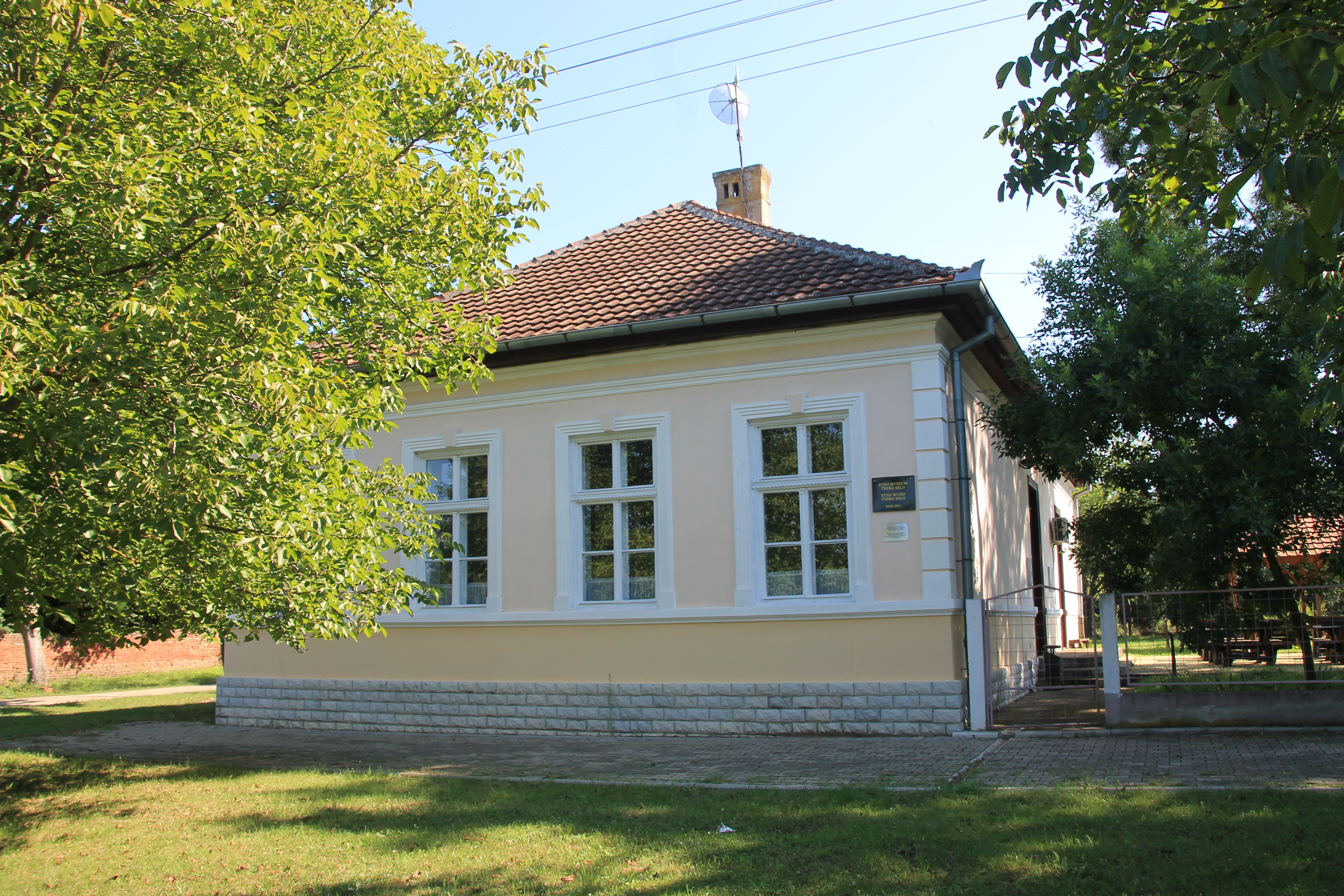
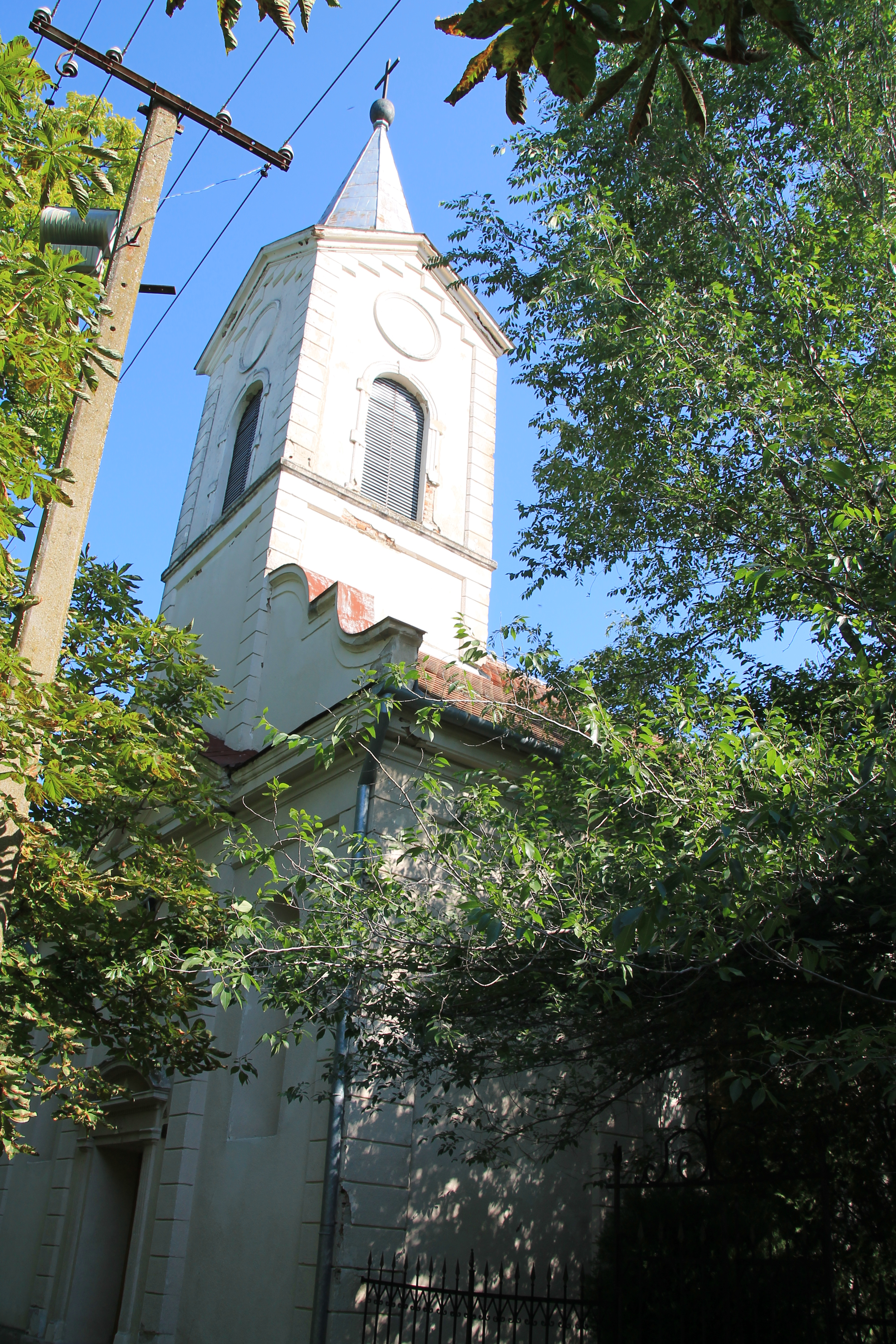
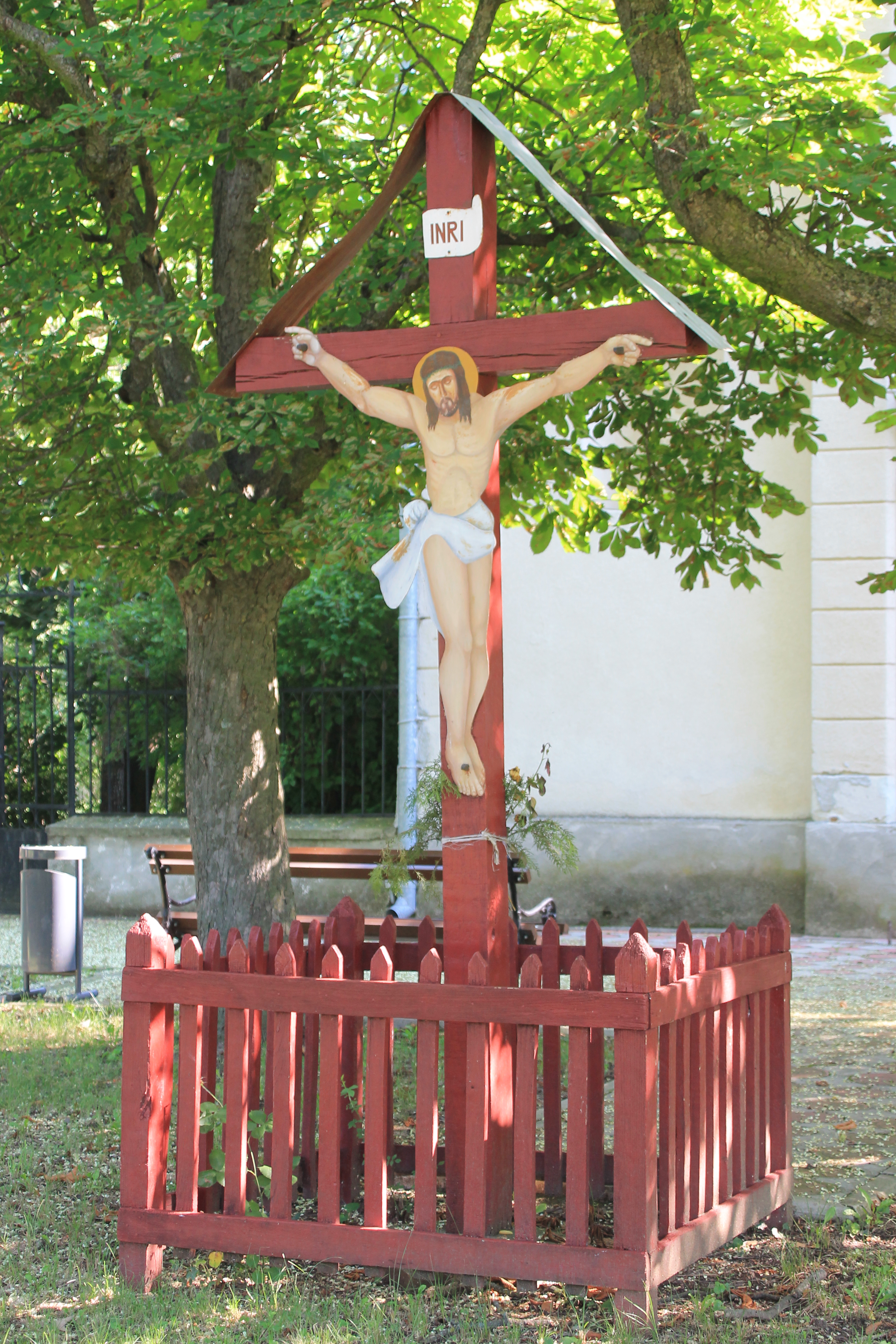
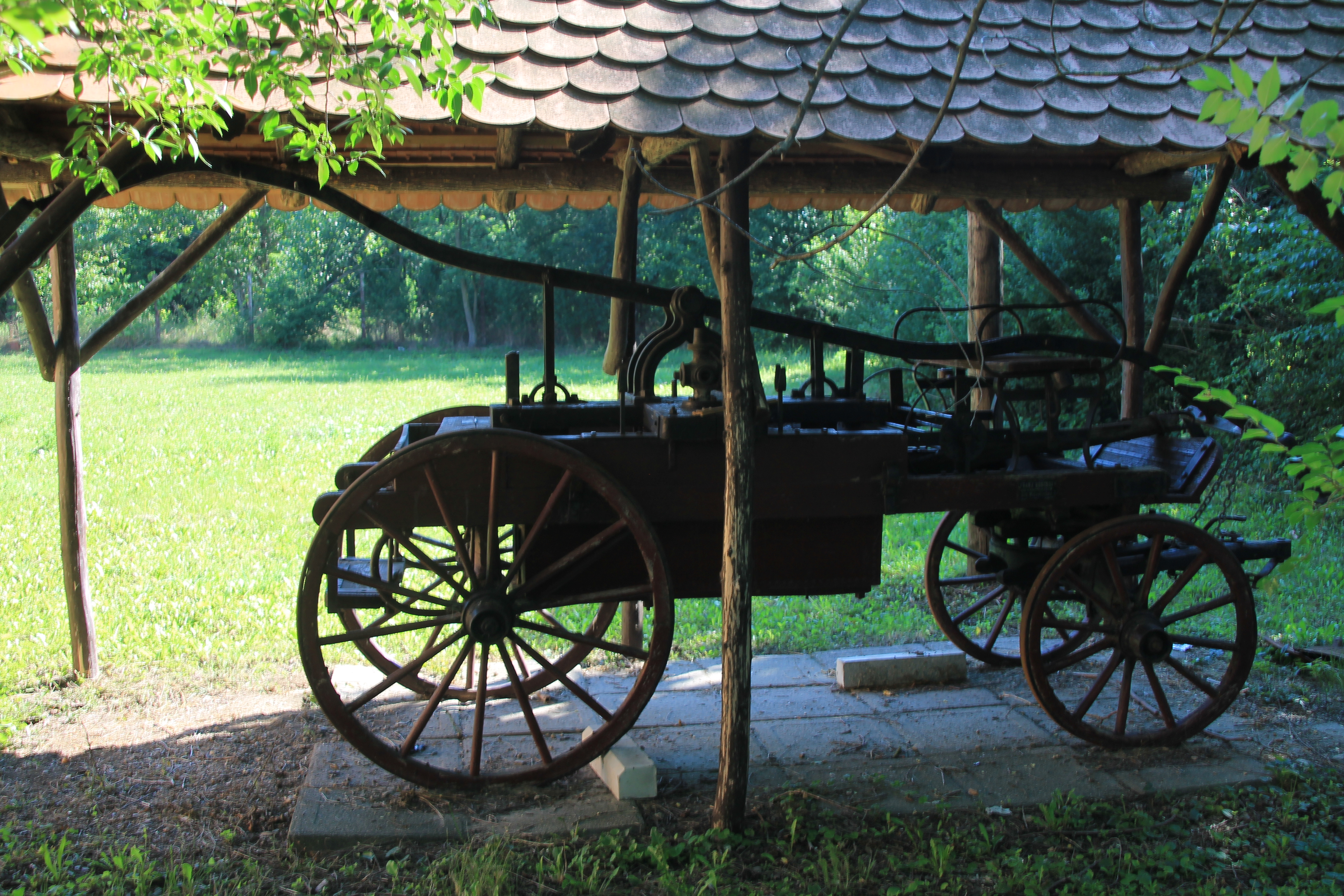
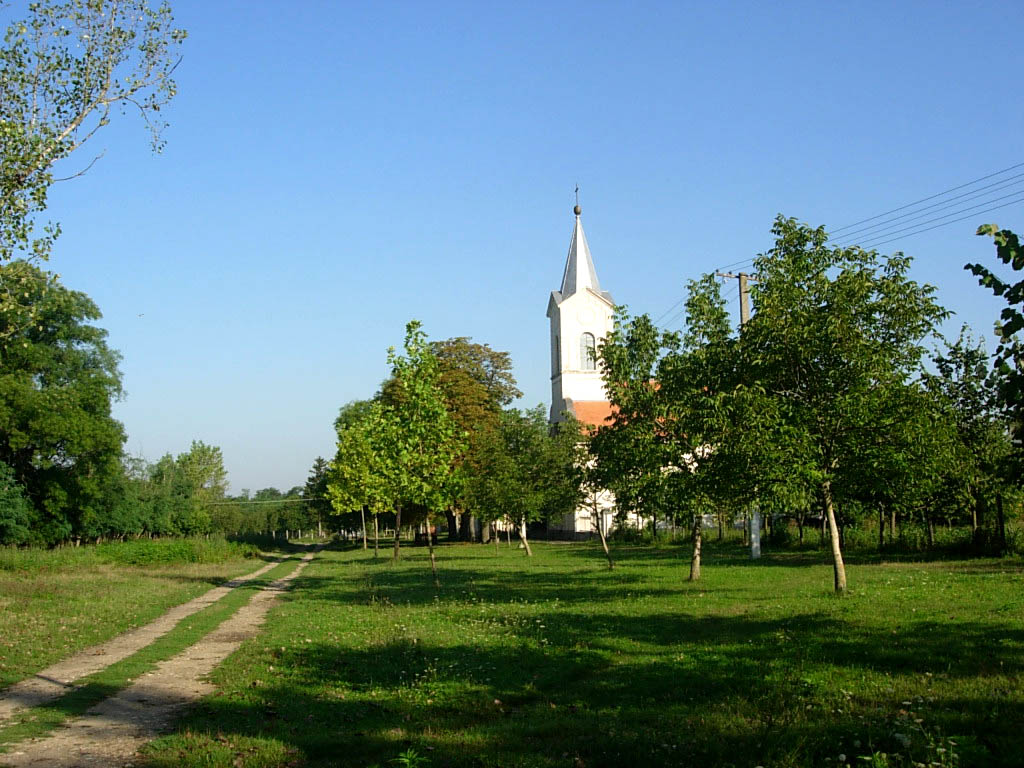
- Češko Selo

- Location of Češko Selo within Serbia Češko Selo (Serbia) Češko Selo (Europe)
- Coordinates: 44°56′30″N 21°22′09″E
- Country: Serbia
- Province: Vojvodina
- District: South Banat
- Municipality: Bela Crkva
- Elevation: 116 m (381 ft)

Population (2022)
  - Češko Selo: 26
- Time zone: UTC+1 (CET)
  - Summer (DST): UTC+2 (CEST)
- Area code: +381(0)13
- Car plates: VŠ

Češko Selo (Serbian Cyrillic: Чешко Село, Czech: Česká ves) is a village located in the Bela Crkva municipality, South Banat District, Vojvodina, Serbia. The village has a population of 26 people (2022 census). Its name means "the Czech village", and it is the only settlement with ethnic Czech majority in Serbia.

== Demographics ==
=== Historical population ===
- 1961: 163
- 1971: 118
- 1981: 86
- 1991: 58
- 2002: 46
- 2011: 40
- 2022: 26

=== Ethnic groups ===
According to data from the 2022 census, ethnic groups in the village include:

- 17 (65.4%) Czechs
- 5 (19.2%) Serbs
- Others/Undeclared/Unknown

== See also ==
- List of places in Serbia
- List of cities, towns and villages in Vojvodina
