= Crvena Crkva =

Crvena Crkva Црвена Црква
- Village (Selo)
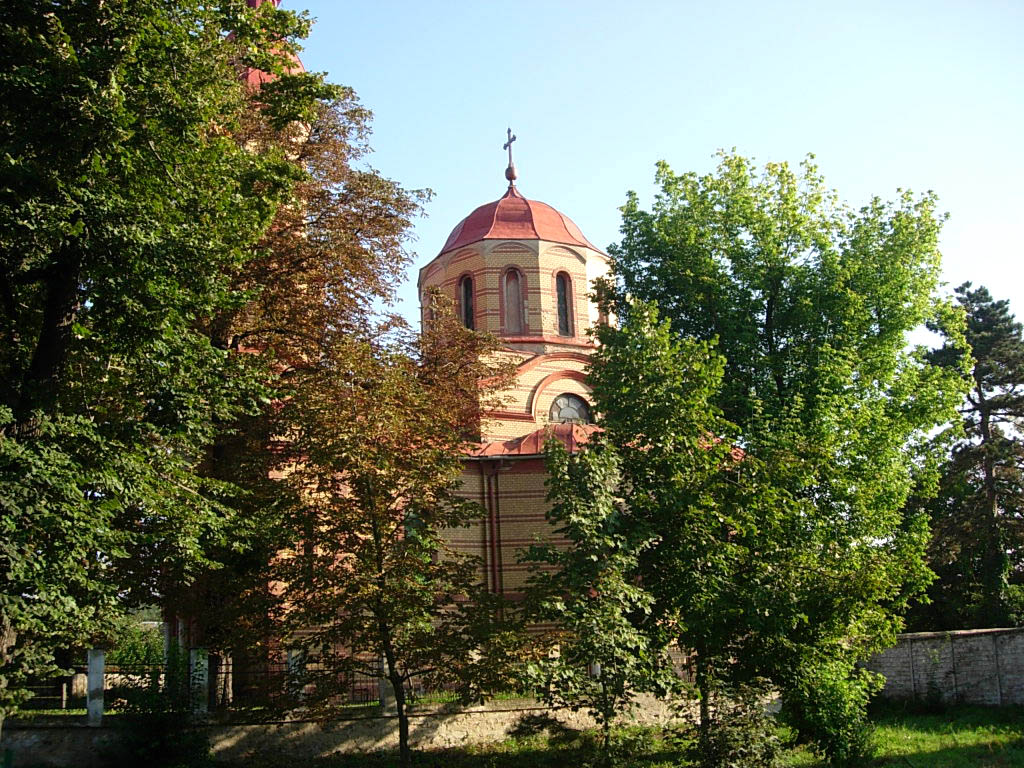
- The Orthodox Church

- Location of Crvena Crkva within Serbia Crvena Crkva (Serbia) Crvena Crkva (Europe)
- Coordinates: 44°54′01″N 21°21′33″E
- Country: Serbia
- Province: Vojvodina
- District: South Banat
- Municipality: Bela Crkva
- Elevation: 72 m (236 ft)

Population (2022)
  - Crvena Crkva: 600
- Time zone: UTC+1 (CET)
  - Summer (DST): UTC+2 (CEST)
- Postal code: 26323
- Area code: +381(0)13
- Car plates: VŠ

Crvena Crkva (Serbian Cyrillic: Црвена Црква, meaning Red Church) is a village in Serbia. It is situated in the Bela Crkva municipality, in the South Banat District, Vojvodina province. The village has a Serb ethnic majority (93.96%) and a population of 600 people (2002 census).
