= Dupljaja =

Dupljaja Дупљаја
- Village (Selo)
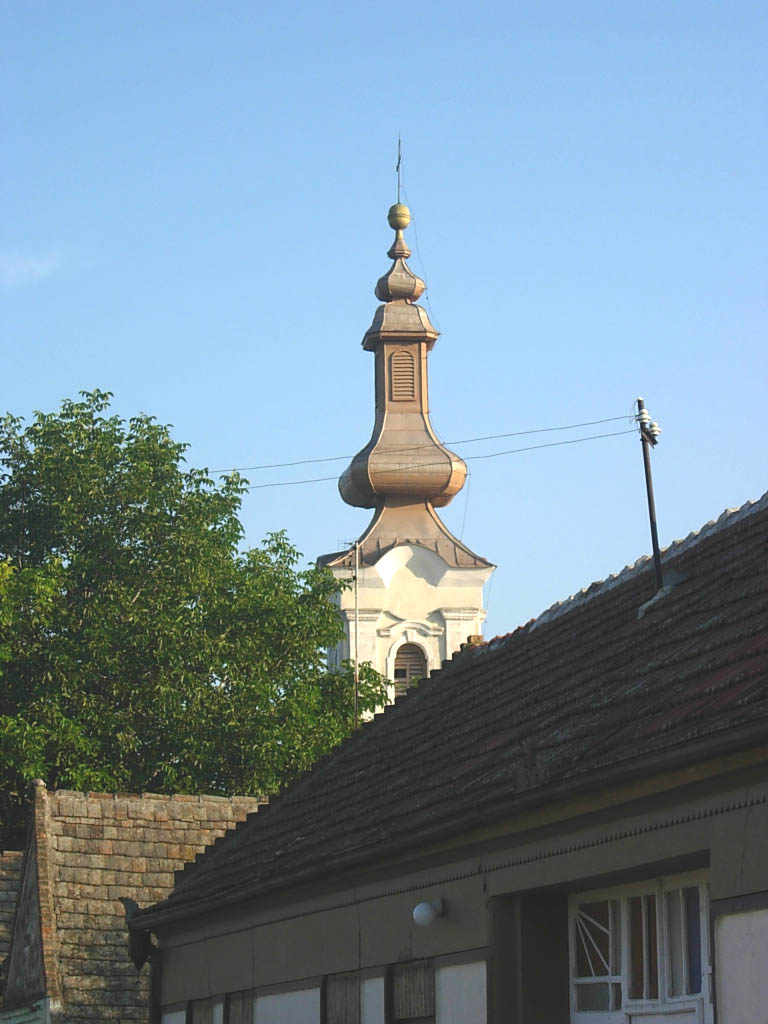
- The Orthodox church

- Location of Dupljaja within Serbia Dupljaja (Serbia) Dupljaja (Europe)
- Coordinates: 44°55′22″N 21°16′23″E
- Country: Serbia
- Province: Vojvodina
- District: South Banat
- Municipality: Bela Crkva
- Elevation: 76 m (249 ft)

Population (2002)
  - Dupljaja: 996
- Time zone: UTC+1 (CET)
  - Summer (DST): UTC+2 (CEST)
- Postal code: 26328
- Area code: +381(0)13
- Car plates: VŠ

Dupljaja (Serbian Cyrillic: Дупљаја) is a village in Serbia. It is situated in the Bela Crkva municipality, in the South Banat District, Vojvodina province on the bank of the river Karaš. The village has a Serb ethnic majority (90.74%) and a population of 996 (2002 census).

== History and archaeology ==
Archaeologist have discovered the remains of the old Slavic city Karaš, which was the capital and the largest fort of Banat in the 11th century. The remains include part of an old church and part of the building which supposedly was the palace of the prince, as well as several hundred coins that originated from central and western Europe and pieces of golden and silver jewels.

There are also remains from Prehistory and from the Bronze Age (mostly belonging to the Dubovac culture). The most famous archaeological Bronze Age artifacts from Dupljaja are the so-called "Dupljaja chariots", which are about 3,500-3,300 years old, and whose photograph features on Serbian drivers licenses.

In 1921, the population of Dupljaja included 1,149 Serbs, 19 Romanians, 10 Slovaks, 10 Germans, and 2 Hungarians.

=== Bronze Age finds ===
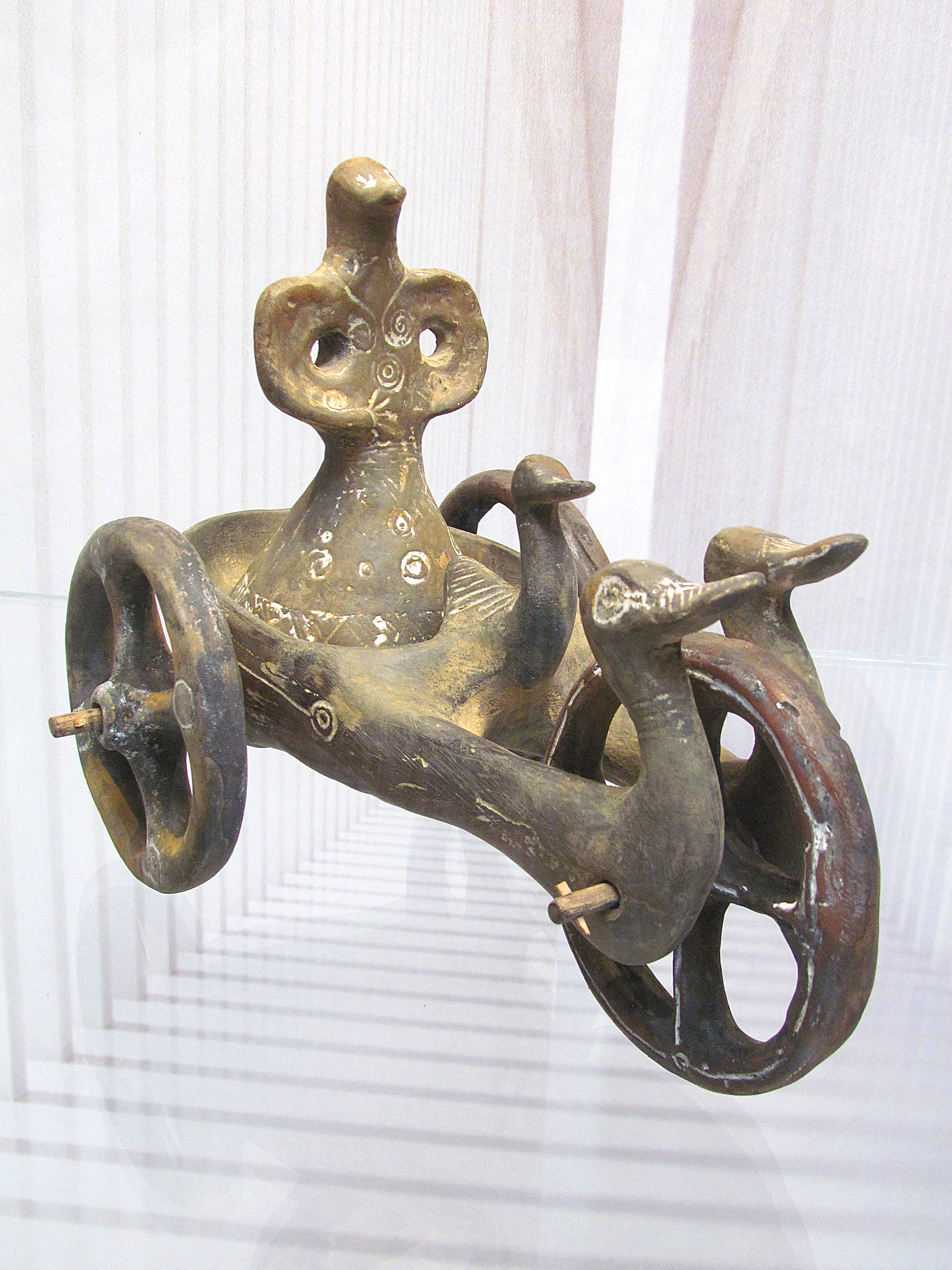
Dupljaja Chariot model 1

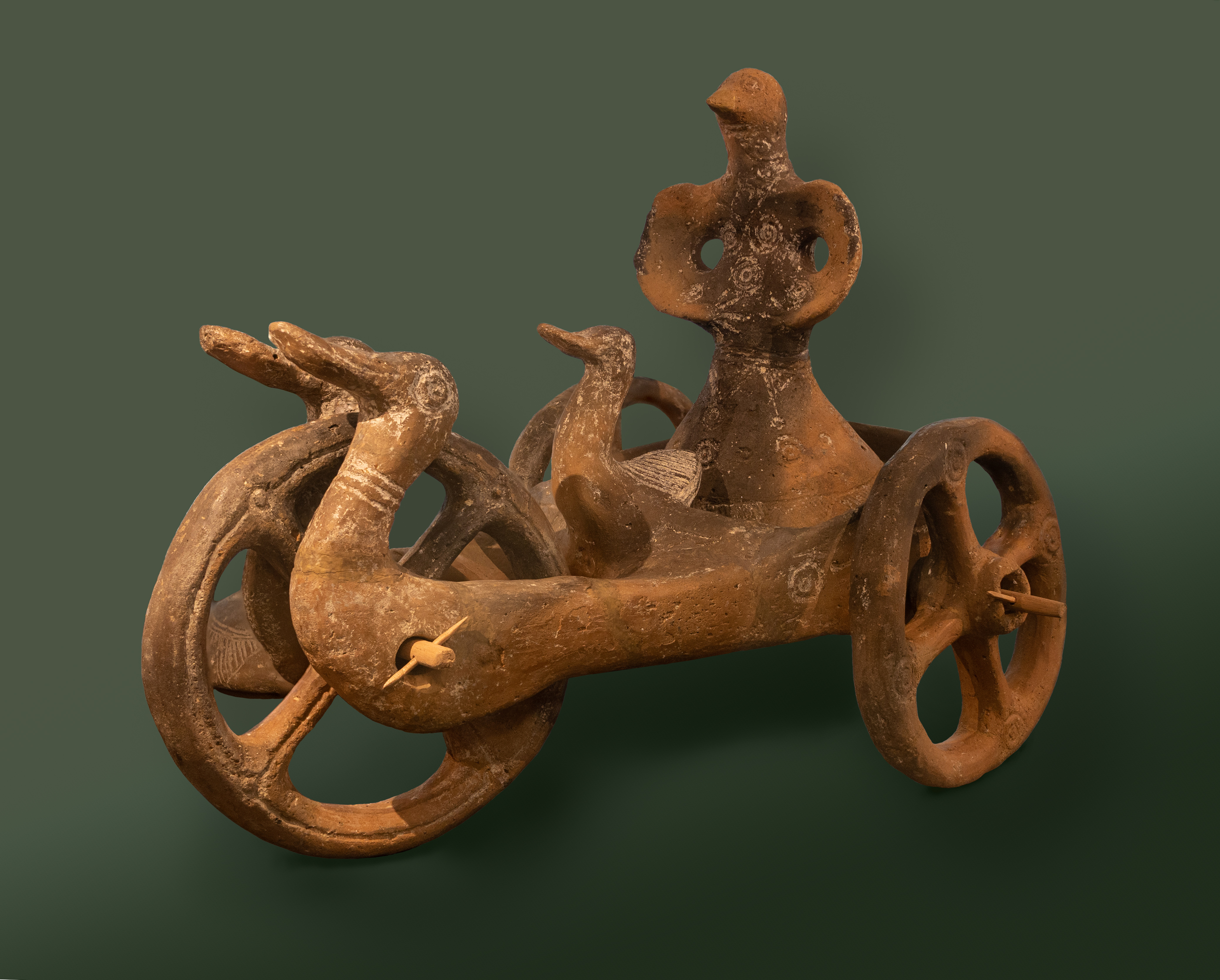
Chariot model 1, side view

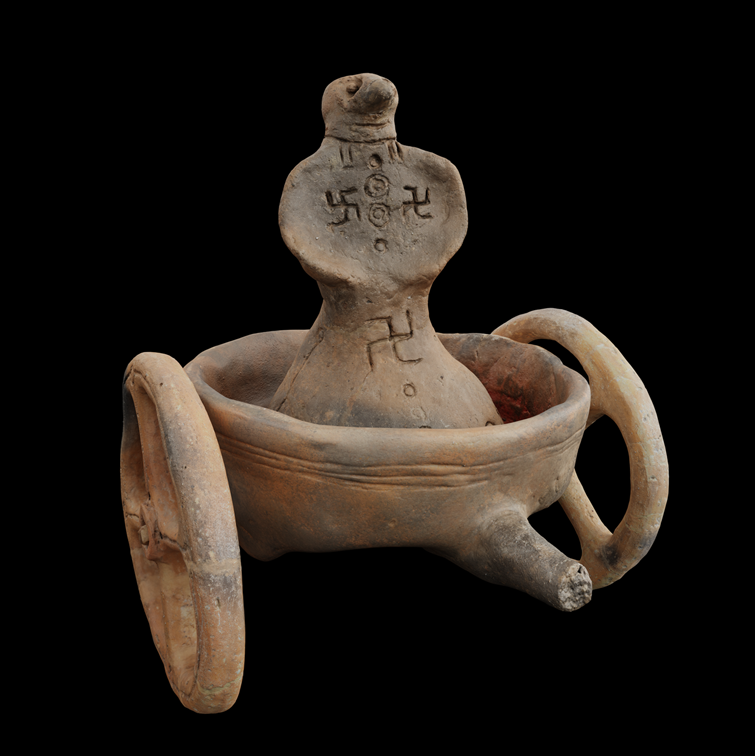
Dupljaja Chariot model 2

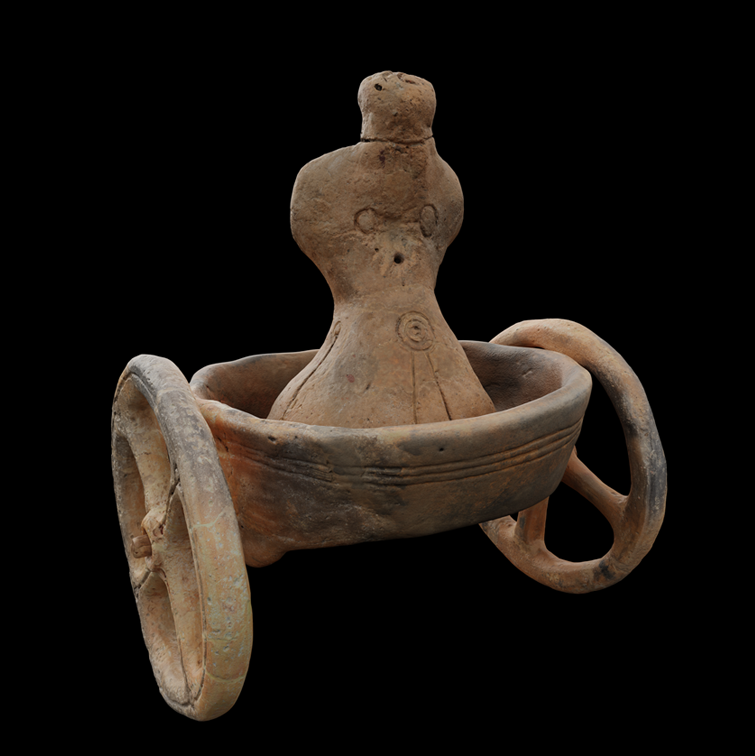
Chariot model 2, reverse view

== Historical population ==
- 1961: 1,174
- 1971: 1,165
- 1981: 1,152
- 1991: 1,027
- 2002: 854
- 2011: 738

== See also ==
- List of places in Serbia
- List of cities, towns and villages in Vojvodina
