= Bela Crkva =

Bela Crkva Бела Црква (Serbian) Biserica Albă (Romanian) Fehértemplom (Hungarian) Bílý Kostel (Czech)
- Town and municipality
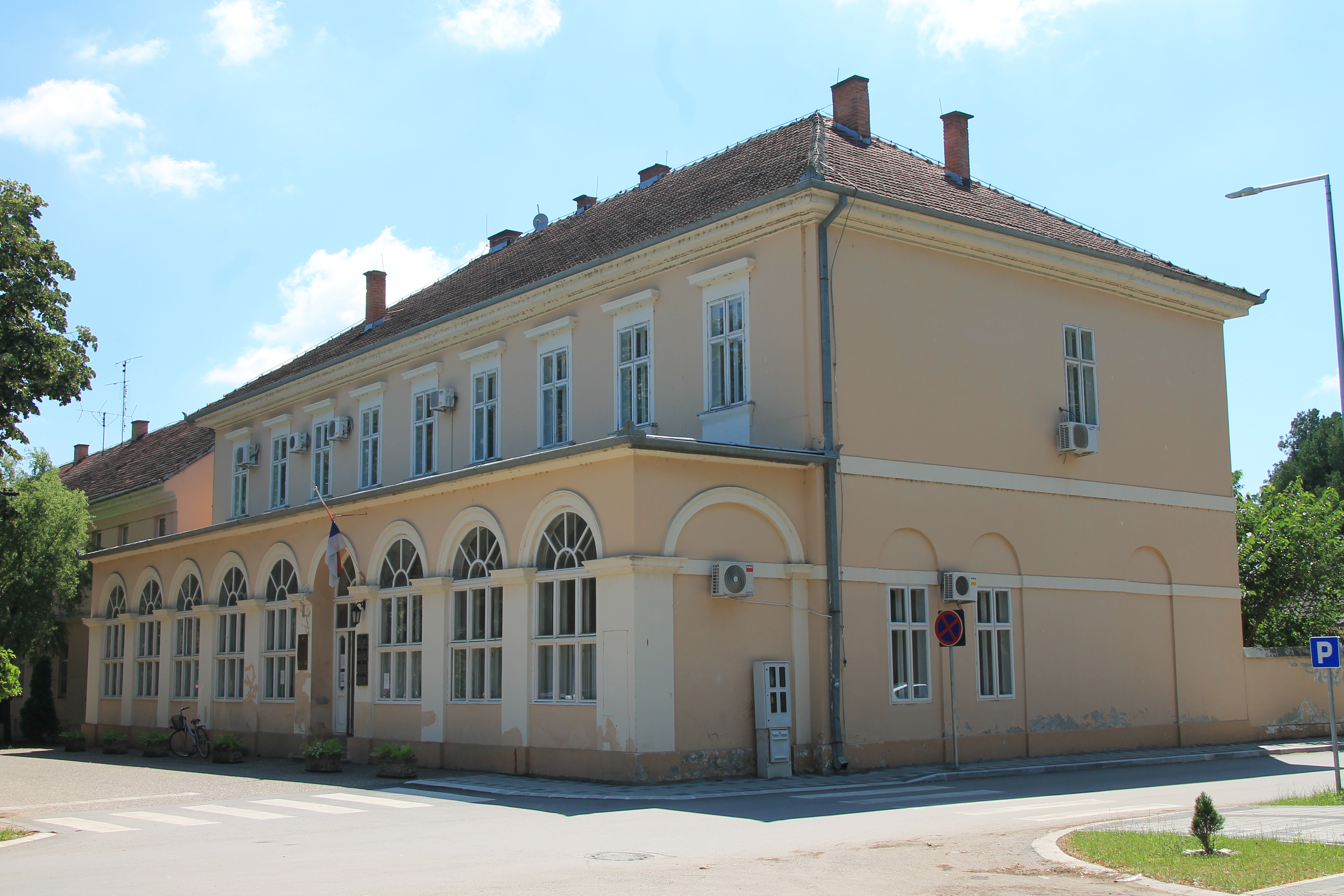
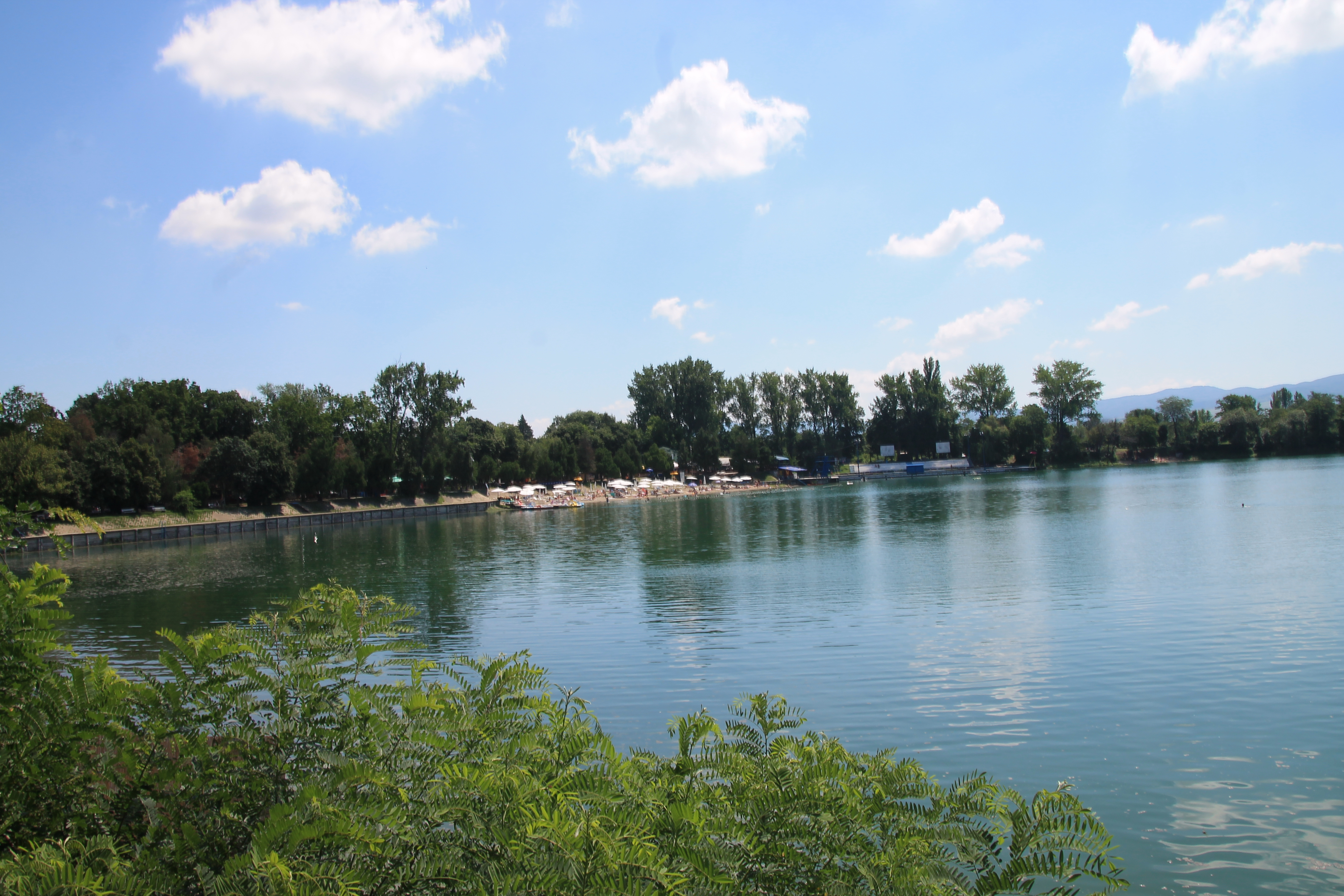
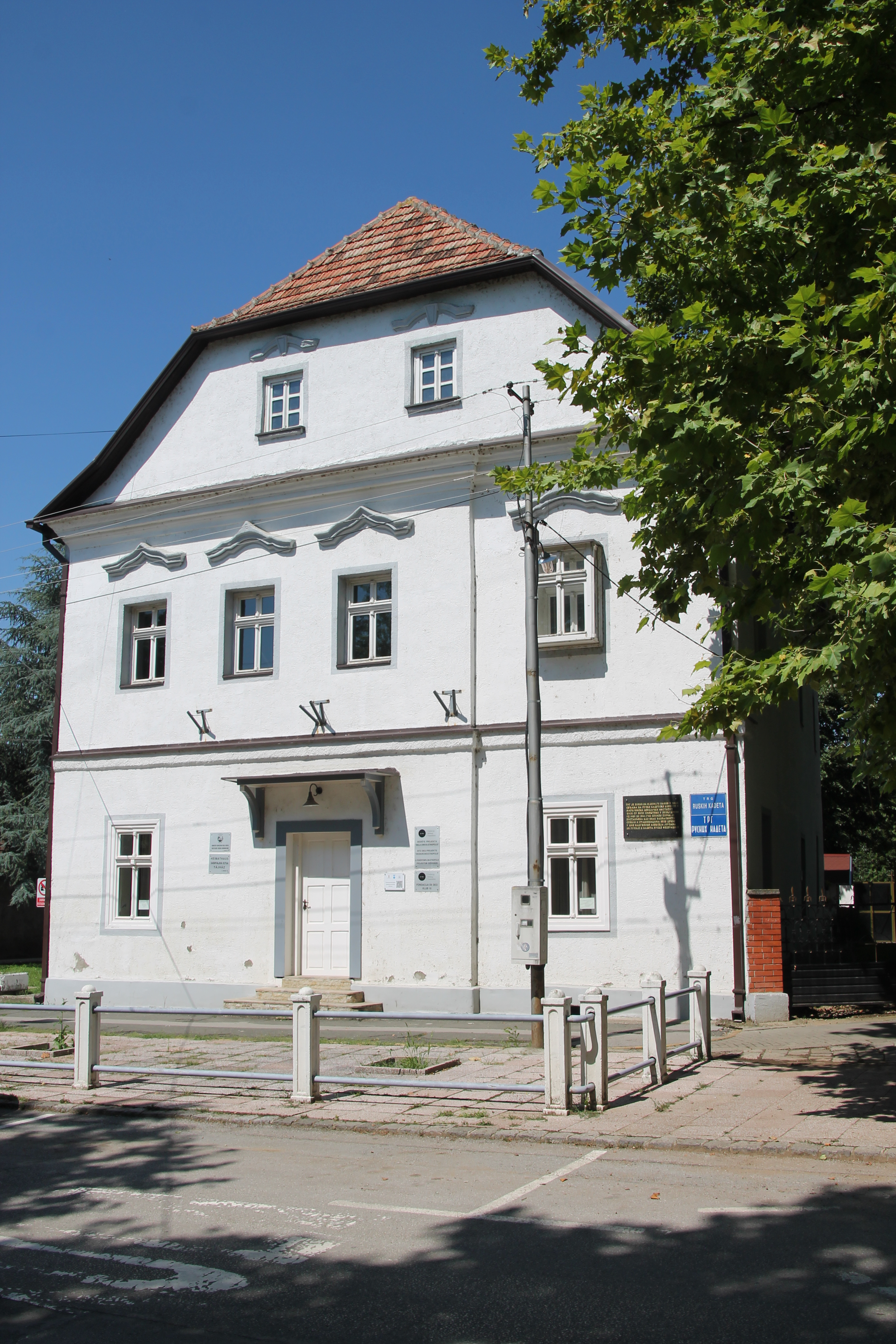
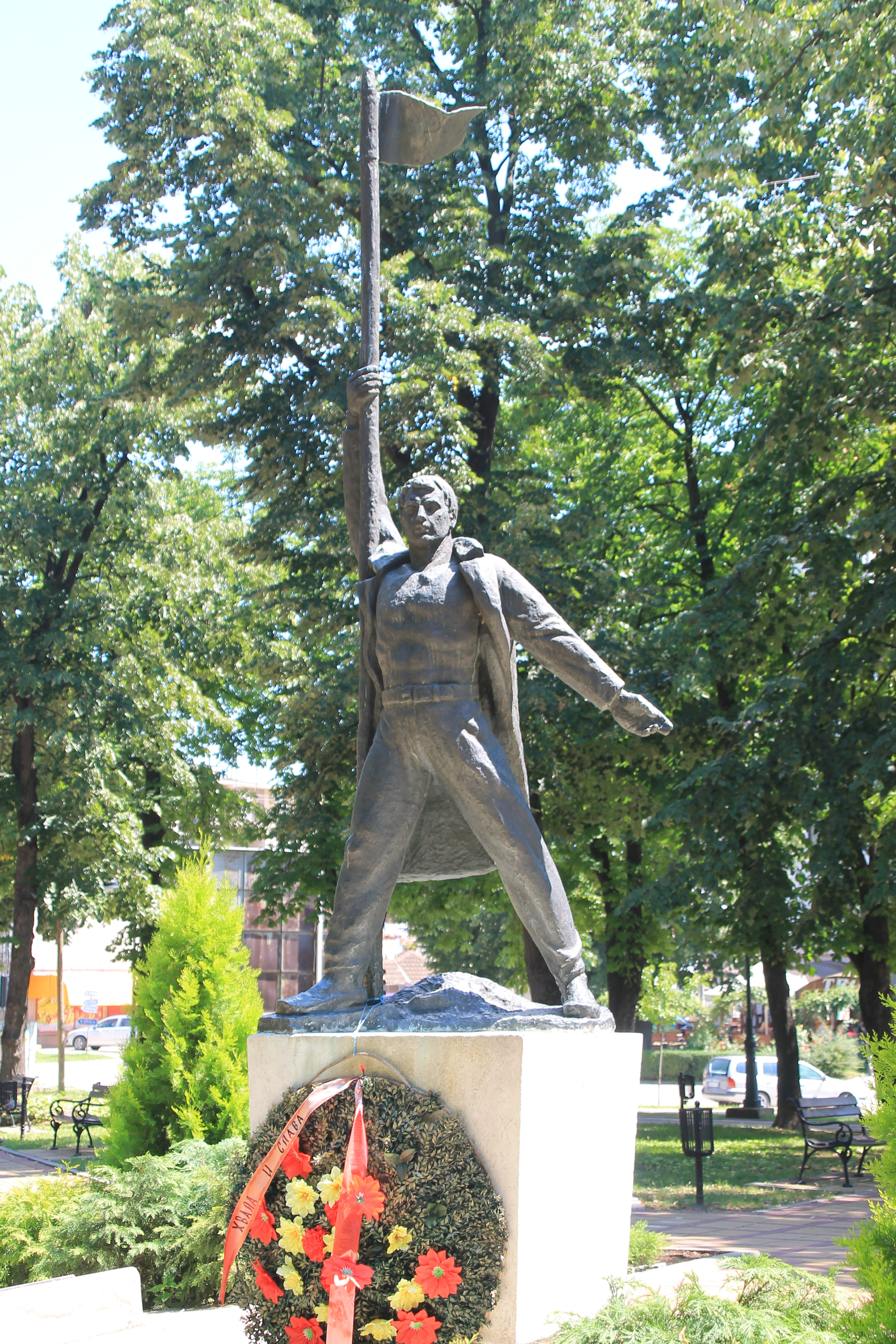
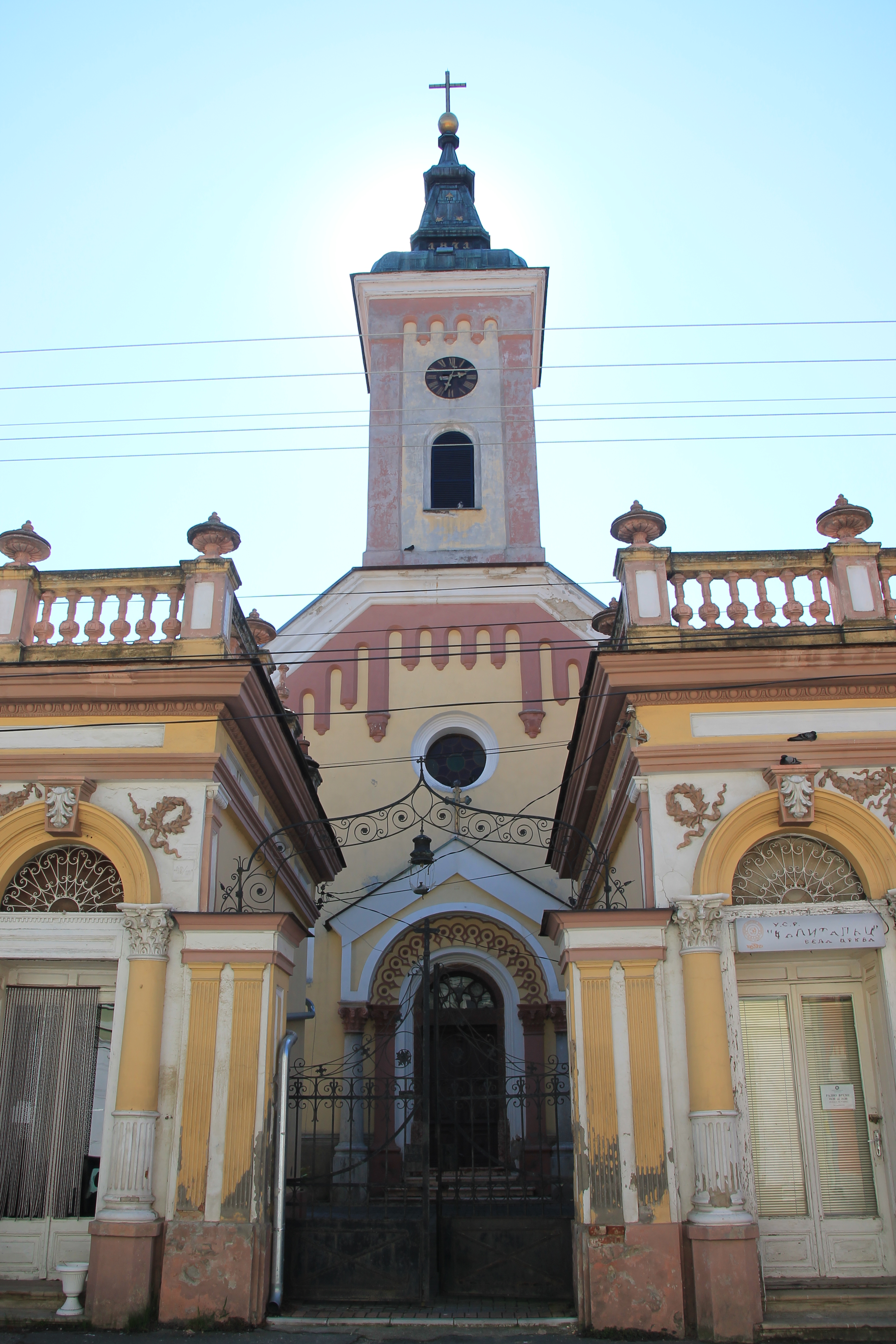
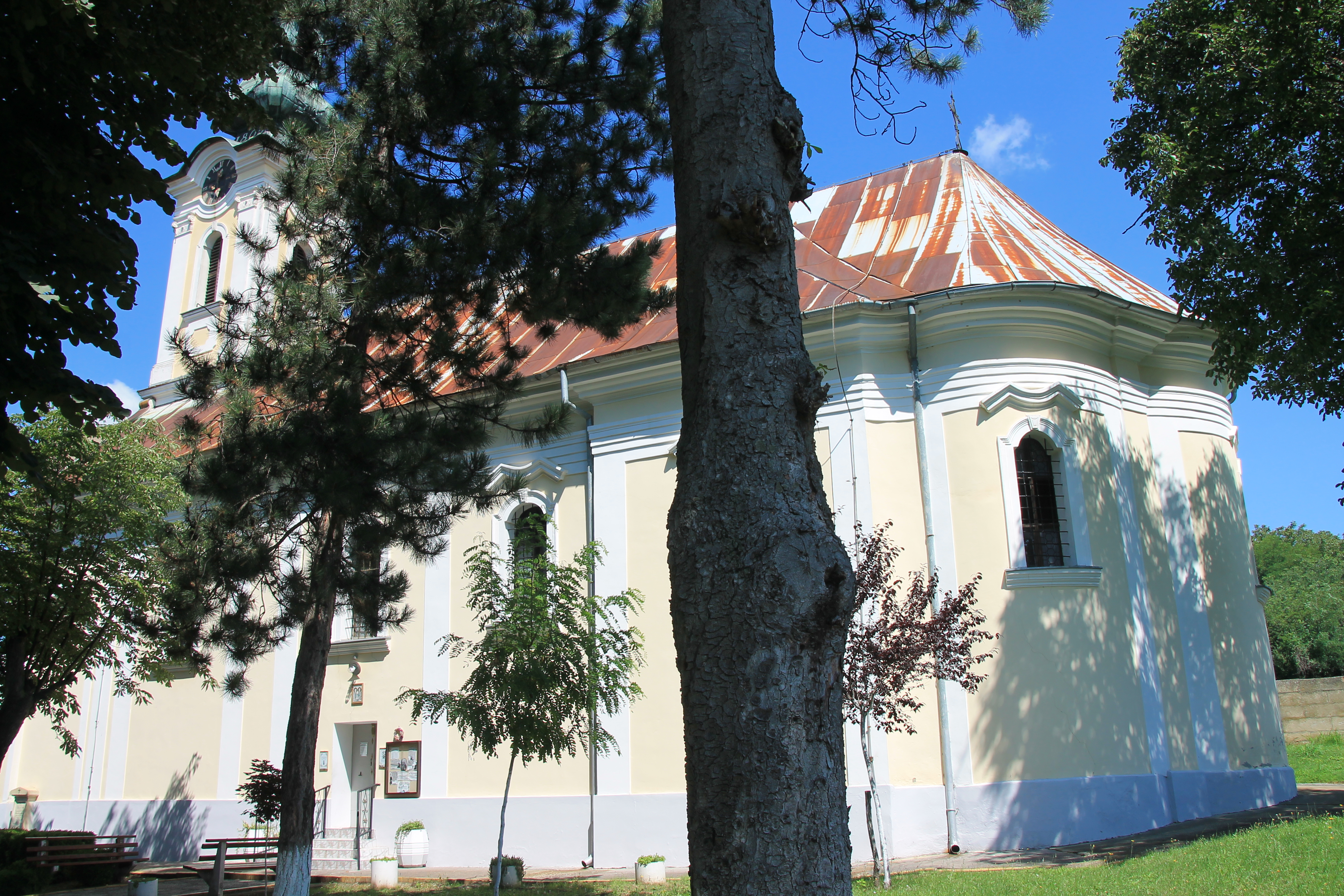
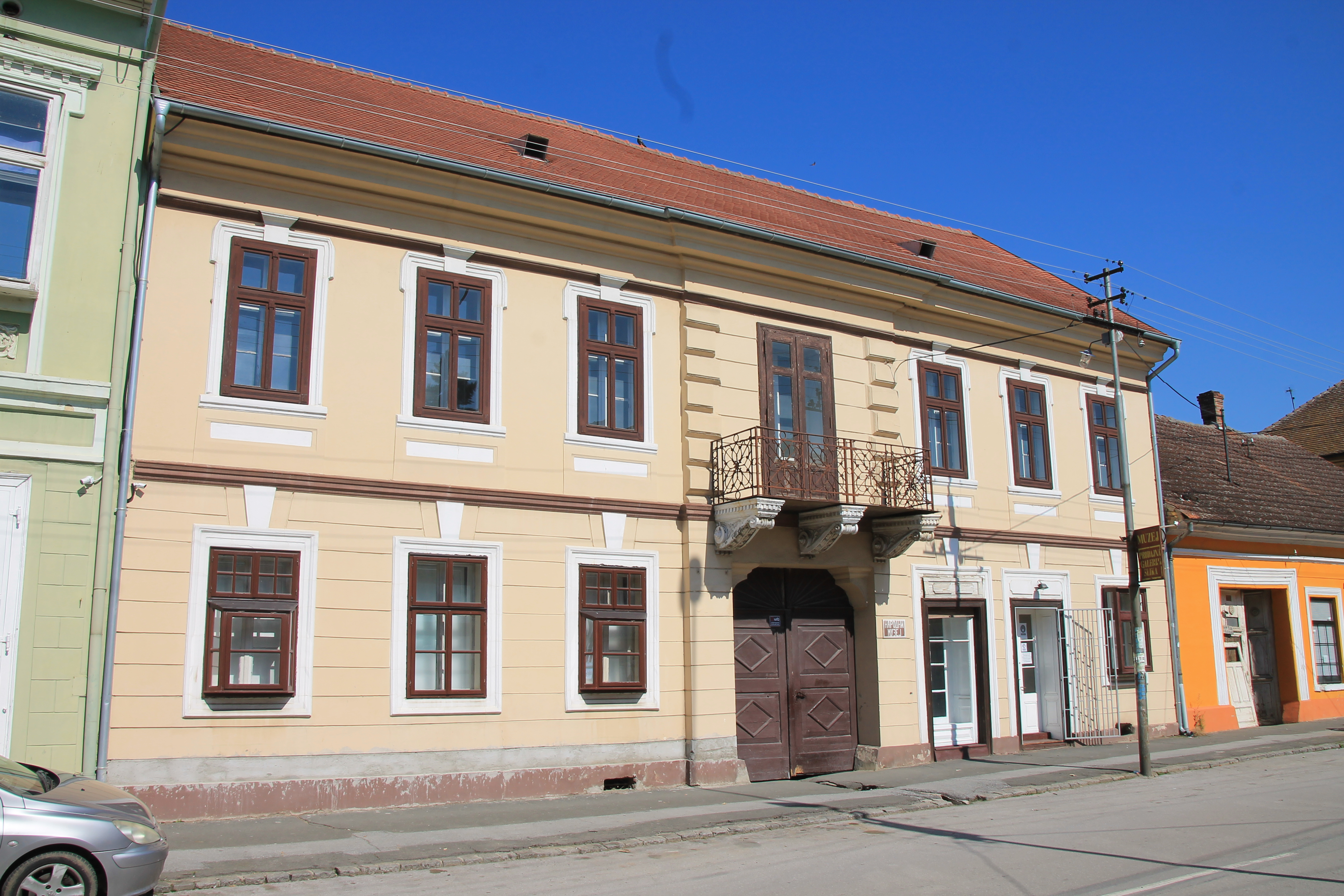
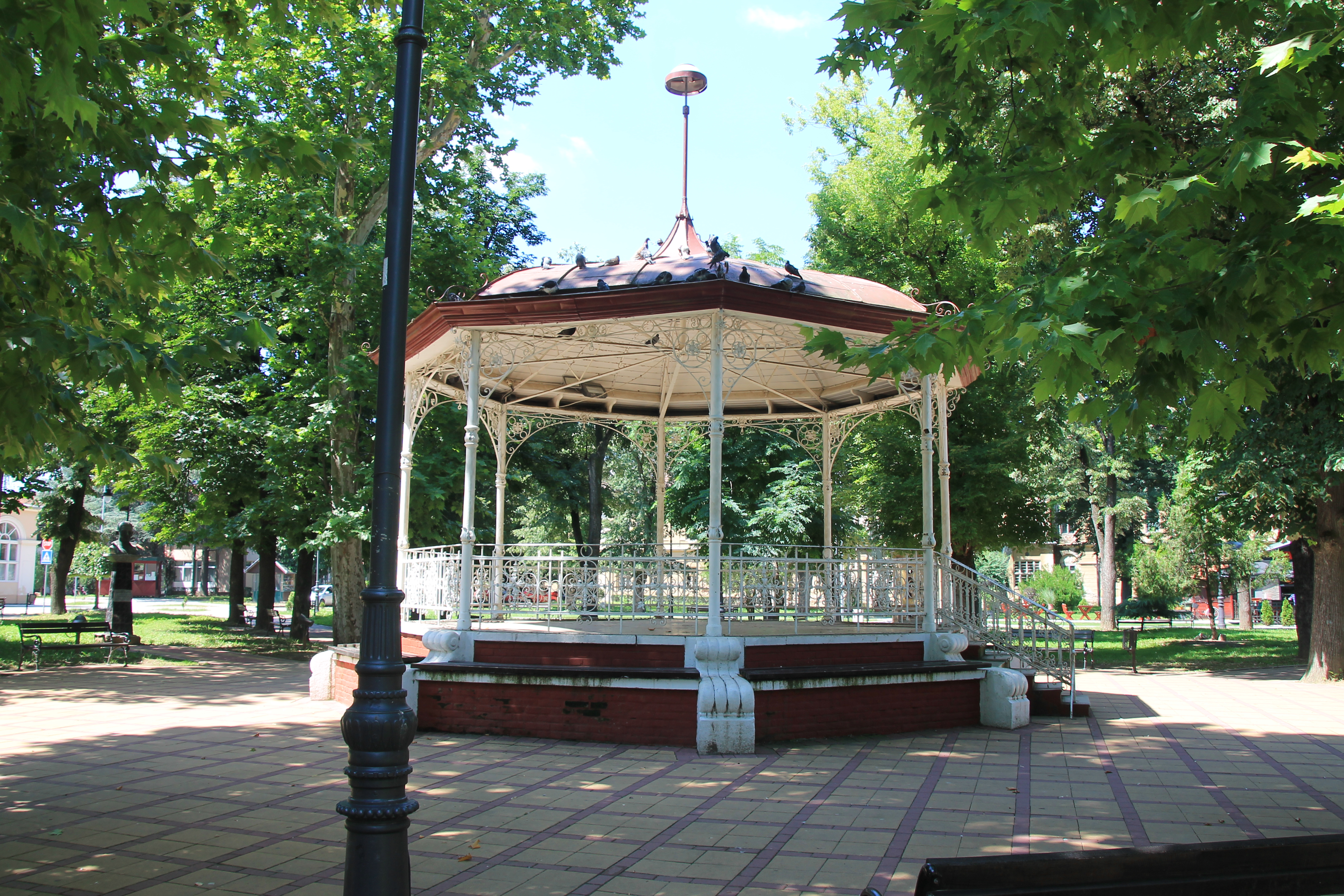
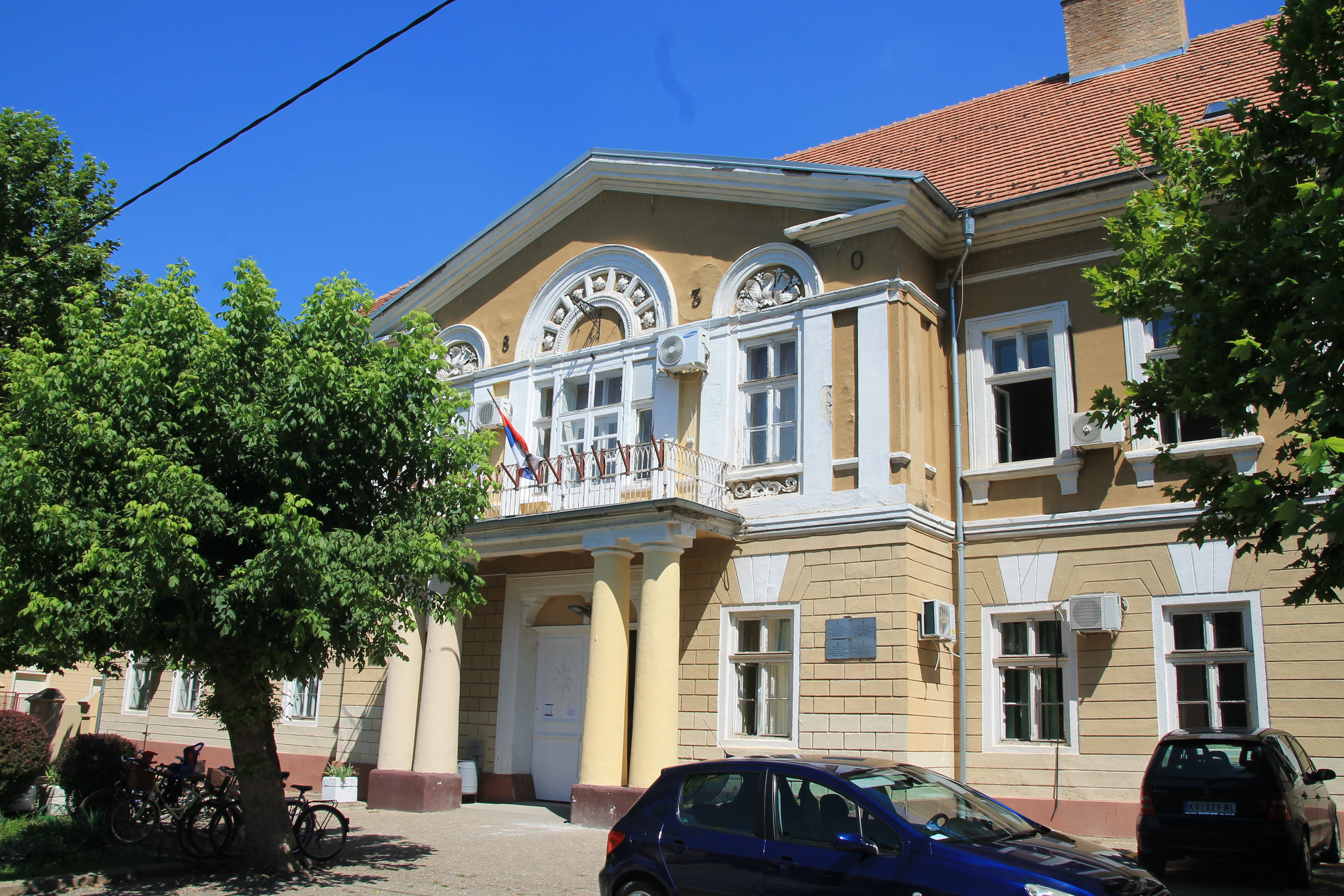
- Bela Crkva

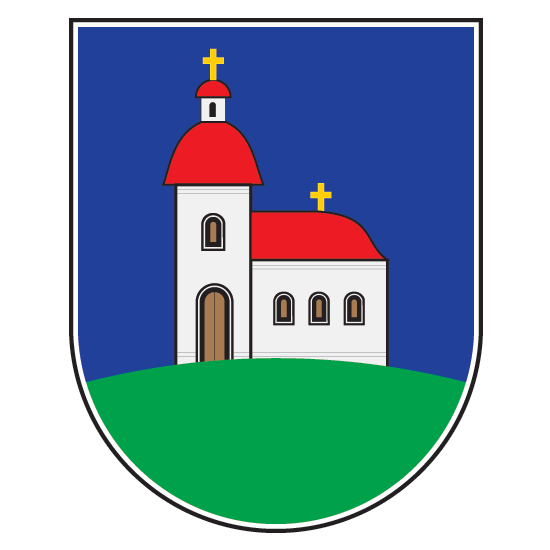
- Coat of arms

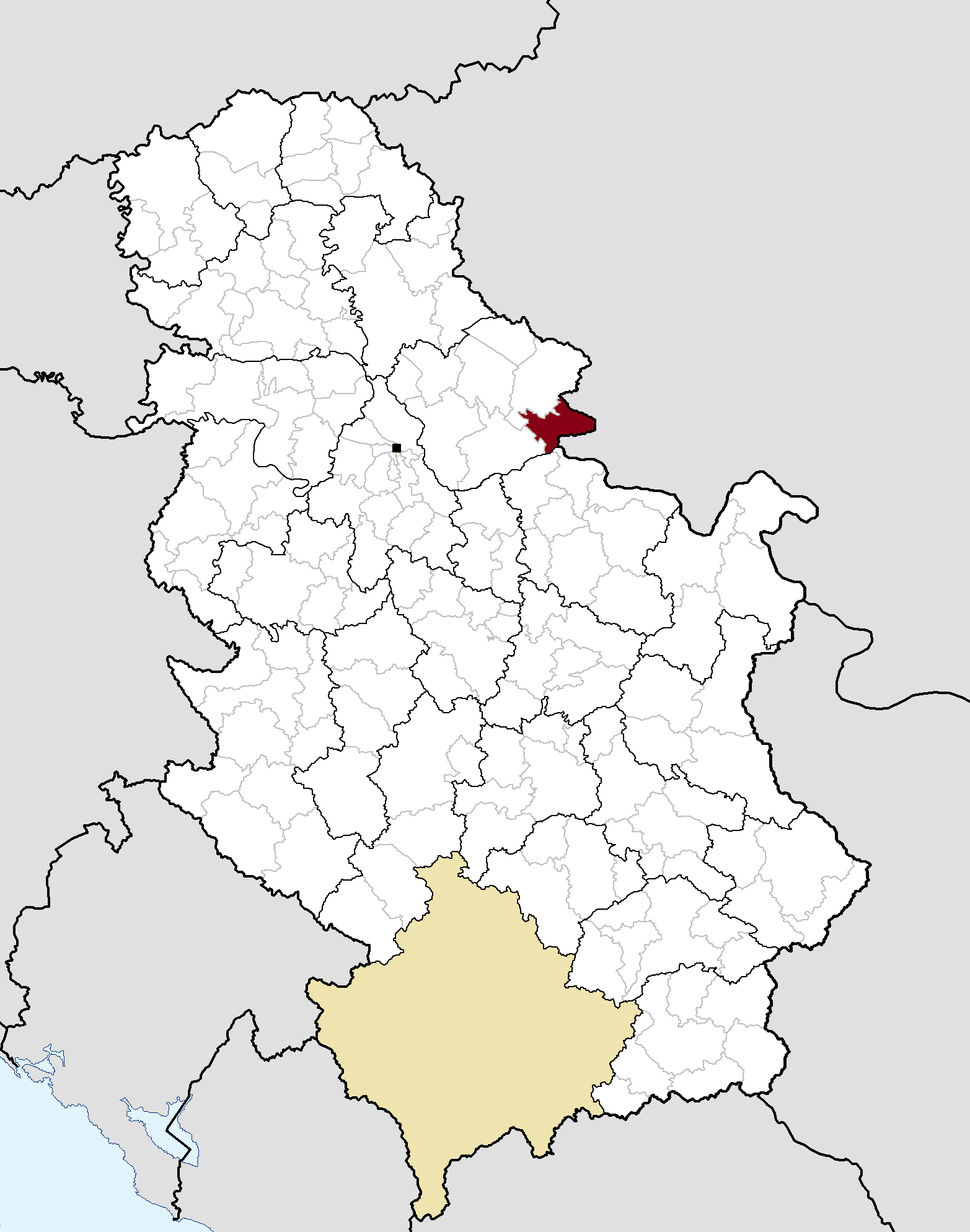
- Location of Bela Crkva within Serbia
- Interactive map of Bela Crkva
- Coordinates: 44°53′51″N 21°25′01″E
- Country: Serbia
- Province: Vojvodina
- District: South Banat

Government
  - Mayor: Tatjana Kokar (SNS)

Area
  - Town: 38.82 km^{2} (14.99 sq mi)
  - Municipality: 353.34 km^{2} (136.43 sq mi)
- Elevation: 78 m (256 ft)

Population (2022 census)
  - Town: 7,456
  - Town density: 192.1/km^{2} (497.4/sq mi)
  - Municipality: 14,451
  - Municipality density: 40.898/km^{2} (105.93/sq mi)
- Time zone: UTC+1 (CET)
  - Summer (DST): UTC+2 (CEST)
- Postal code: 26340
- Area code: +381(0)13
- Car plates: VŠ
- Official languages: Serbian together with Romanian, Hungarian and Czech
- Website: www.belacrkva.rs

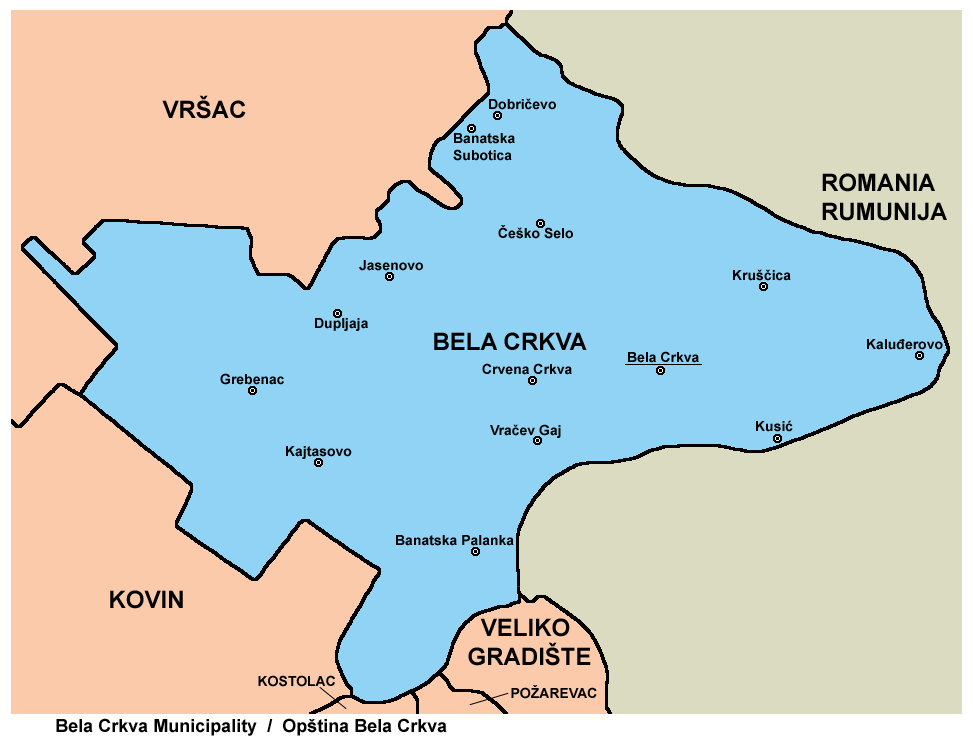
Map of Bela Crkva municipality

Bela Crkva (Serbian Cyrillic: Бела Црква, pronounced [bɛ̂ːlaː tsr̩̂ːkv̞a]; German: Weißkirchen; Hungarian: Fehértemplom; Romanian: Biserica Albă) is a town and municipality located in the South Banat District of the autonomous province of Vojvodina, Serbia. The town has a population of 7,456, while the Bela Crkva municipality has 14,451 inhabitants (2022 census).

Bela Crkva lakes at the outskirts of the town are a popular summer tourist destination.

== Name ==
The name of the town Bela Crkva means "white church" in English. In Romanian, the town is known as Biserica Albă (formerly Albești), in German as Weißkirchen, in Hungarian as Fehértemplom (formerly Fejéregyház), and in Turkish as Aktabya.

== History ==
Neolithic findings of ceramics and burial with Greek-style pots dating to late fifth century BCE have been found in the area.

The town was founded in 1717 when this region was included into the Habsburg monarchy. It was part of the Banatian Military Frontier of the Monarchy and, since 1774, was a seat of the Illyrian (Serbian) section of the Banatian Frontier. Briefly, in 1787–1788, the town was controlled by the Ottomans. In 1848–1849, the town was part of autonomous Serbian Vojvodina, but in 1849 it was again placed under military administration. With the abolishment of the Military Frontier, the town was included into Temes county of the Kingdom of Hungary, one of two autonomous parts of Austria-Hungary. The town was also a seat of the district since 1867.

According to the 1910 census, the town itself was mainly populated by Germans with a group of French, but its surrounding municipal area was mainly populated by Serbs. Census recorded 11,524 citizens in the town, of whom 6,062 spoke German language, 1,994 Serbian, 1,806 Romanian, and 1,213 Hungarian. The municipal area numbered 36,831 inhabitants, of whom 20,987 spoke Serbian, 8,234 Romanian, and 4,791 German. The total population of the town and its municipal area counted together was 48,355, of whom 22,981 spoke Serbian, 10,853 German, 10,040 Romanian, and 2,122 Hungarian.

In the 1920s, it was a center of Russian emigration in Yugoslavia.

Between 1918 and 1945 Bela Crkva was part of the Kingdom of Yugoslavia. From 1945 until 1992 it was part of the Socialist Federal Republic of Yugoslavia. From 1992-2006 it was part of Serbia and Montenegro. Since 2006 it has been part of the independent republic of Serbia.

== Inhabited places ==
Bela Crkva municipality includes the town of Bela Crkva and the following villages:

- Banatska Palanka
- Banatska Subotica
- Vračev Gaj
- Grebenac
- Dobričevo
- Dupljaja
- Jasenovo
- Kajtasovo
- Kaluđerovo
- Kruščica
- Kusić
- Crvena Crkva
- Češko Selo

== Demographics ==
Historical population
Year	Pop.	±% p.a.
1948	25,179	—
1953	25,774	+0.47%
1961	26,276	+0.24%
1971	25,450	−0.32%
1981	25,690	+0.09%
1991	23,707	−0.80%
2002	20,367	−1.37%
2011	17,367	−1.75%
2022	14,451	−1.66%

According to the 2011 census results, the municipality of Bela Crkva had 17,367 inhabitants.

=== Ethnic groups ===
Settlements with Serb ethnic majority are: Bela Crkva, Banatska Palanka, Banatska Subotica, Vračev Gaj, Dupljaja, Jasenovo, Kajtasovo, Kaluđerovo, Kruščica, Kusić, and Crvena Crkva. The settlement with Romanian ethnic majority is Grebenac. The settlement with Hungarian ethnic majority is Dobričevo. The settlement with Czech ethnic majority is Češko Selo.

The ethnic composition of the municipality (as of 2011 census):

Ethnic group	Population	%
Serbs	12,715	73.21%
Romanians	842	4.85%
Roma	791	4.55%
Hungarians	425	2.45%
Macedonians	97	0.56%
Montenegrins	66	0.38%
Germans	59	0.34%
Yugoslavs	52	0.30%
Others	2,320	13.36%
Total	17,367	

== Gallery ==
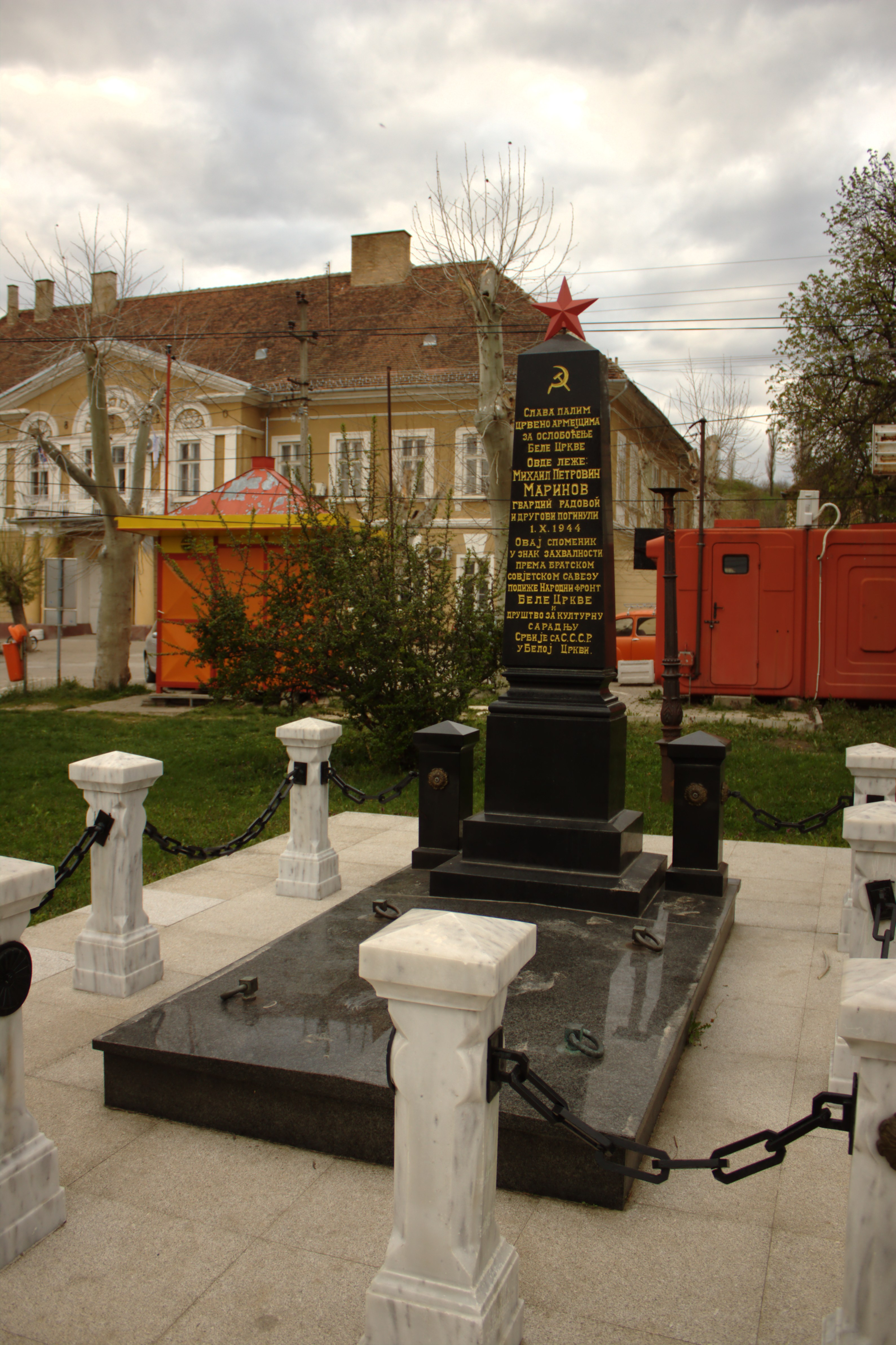
Bela Crkva monument dedicated to fallen Red Army Soviet soldiers

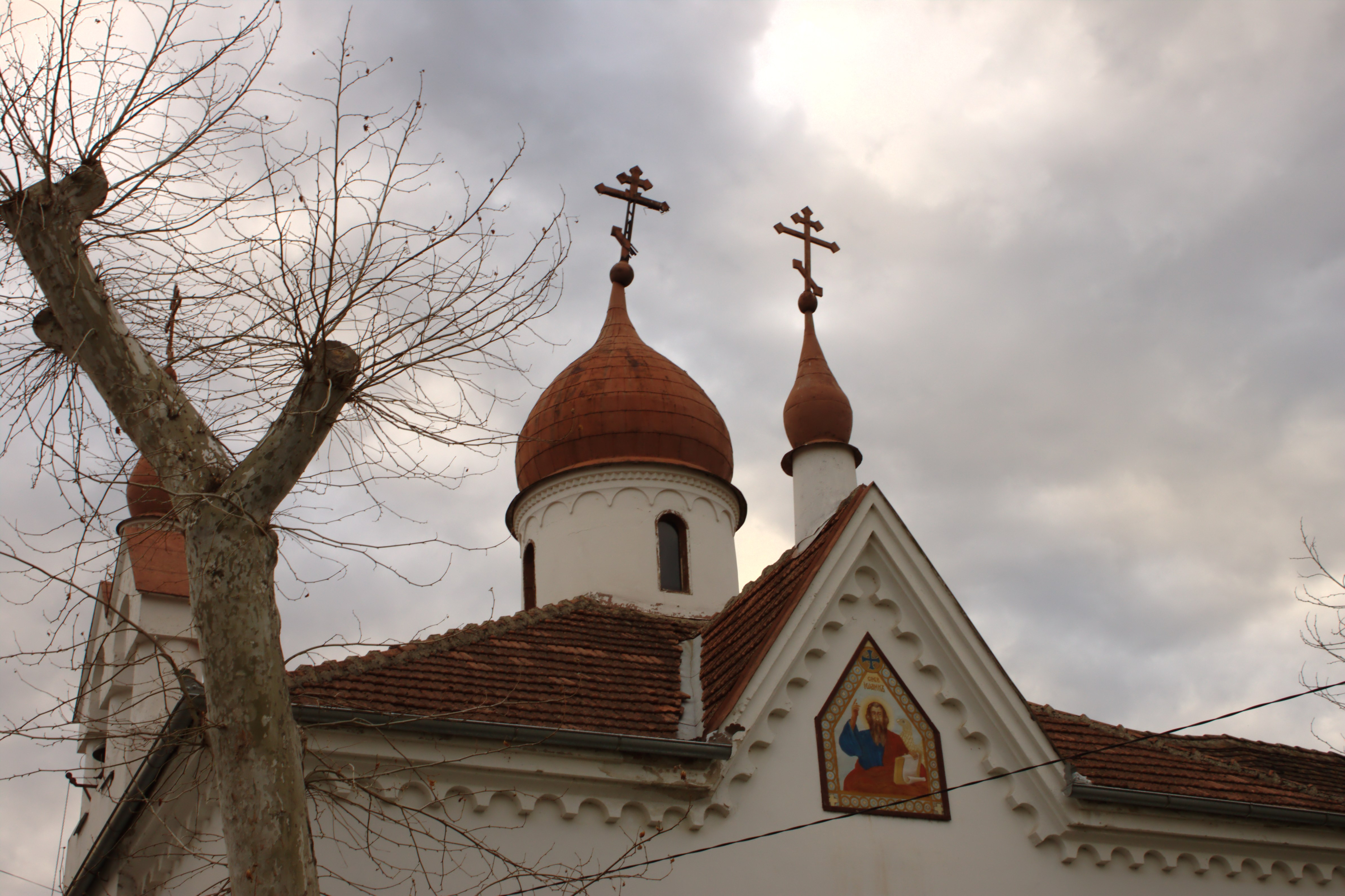
The Russian church

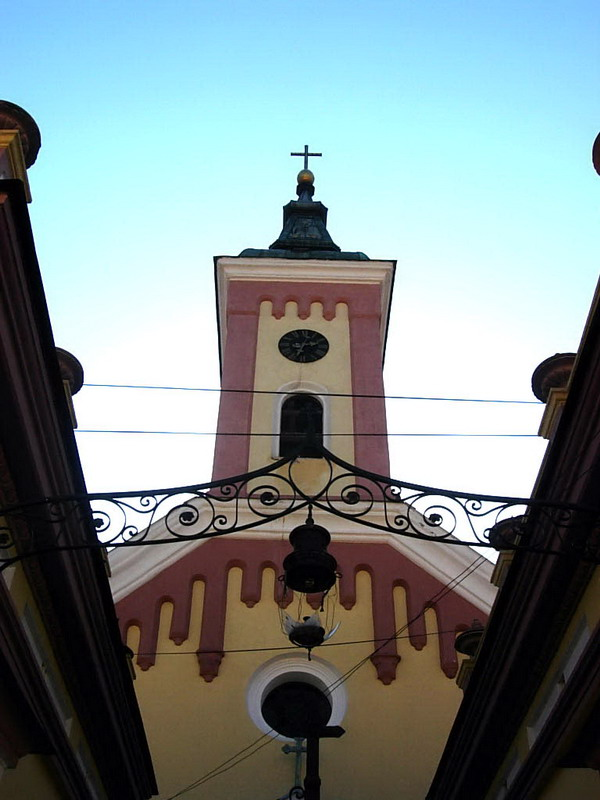
The Romanian Orthodox church

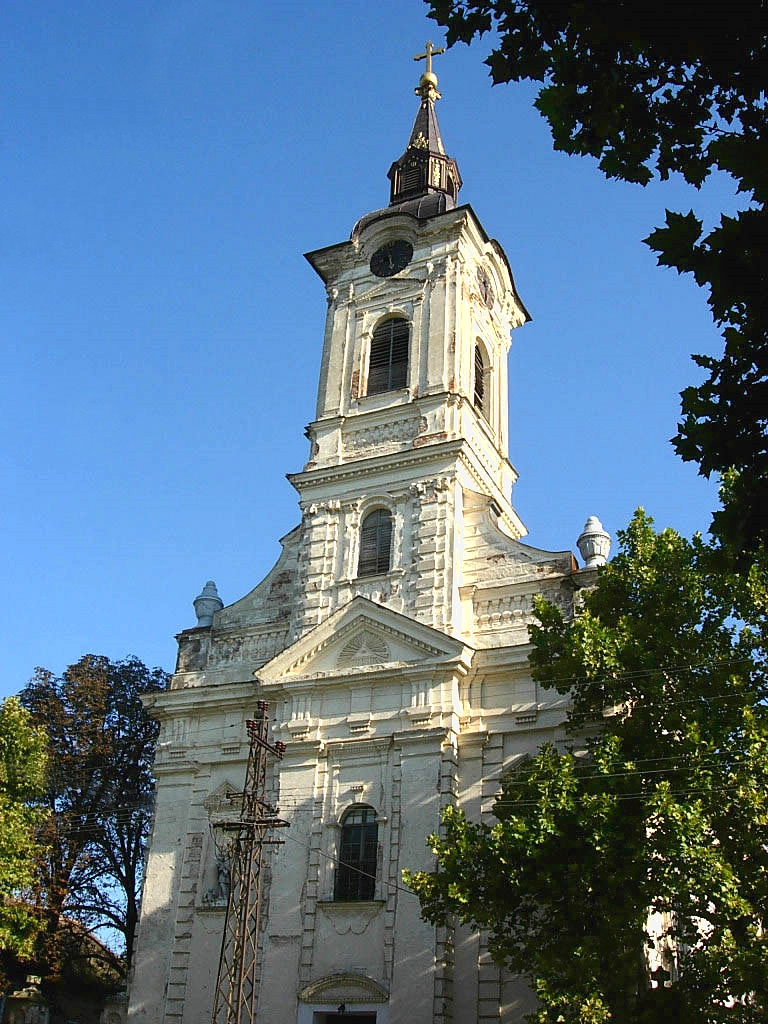
The St. Ana Catholic Church

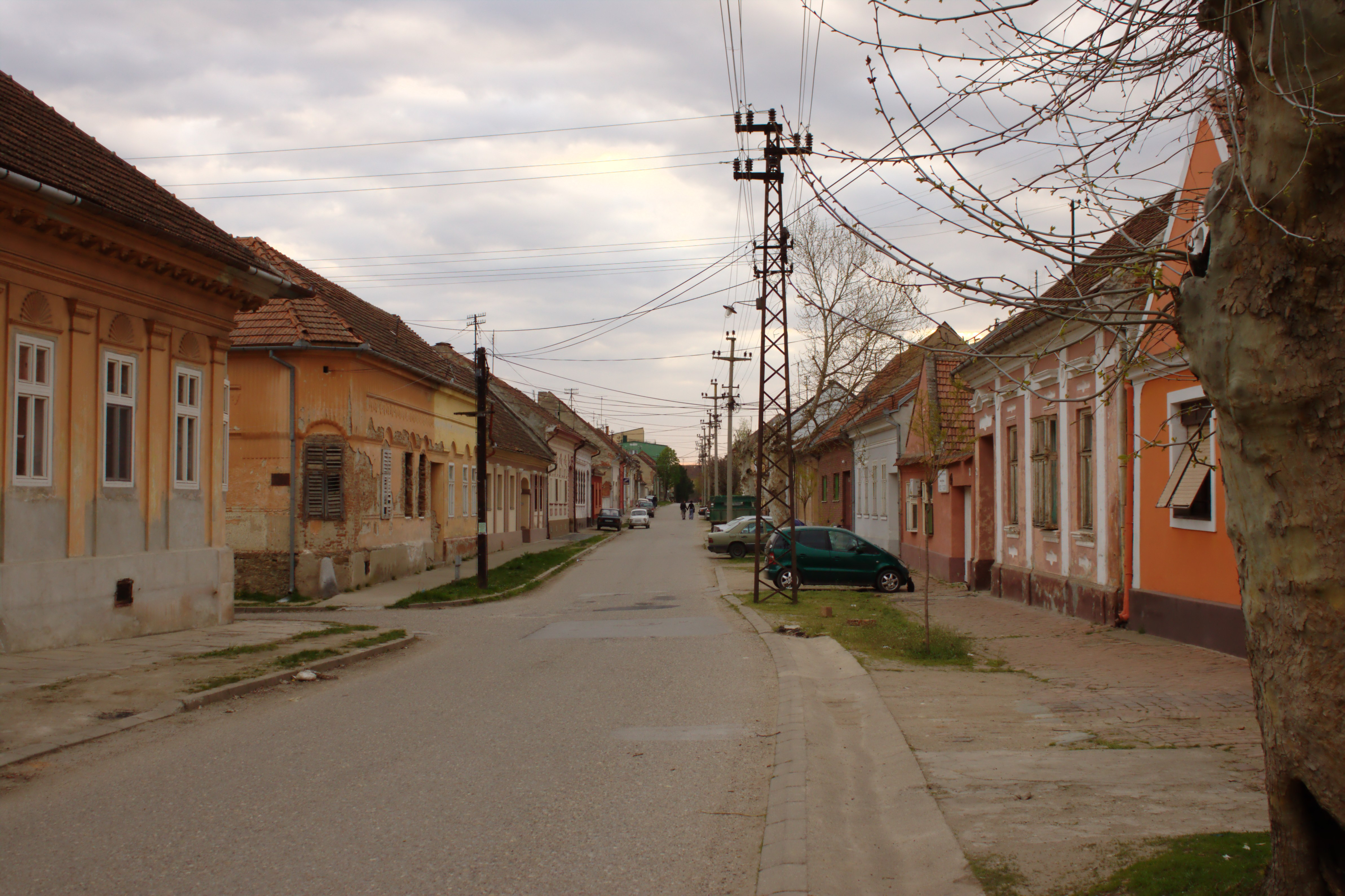
Bela Crkva street

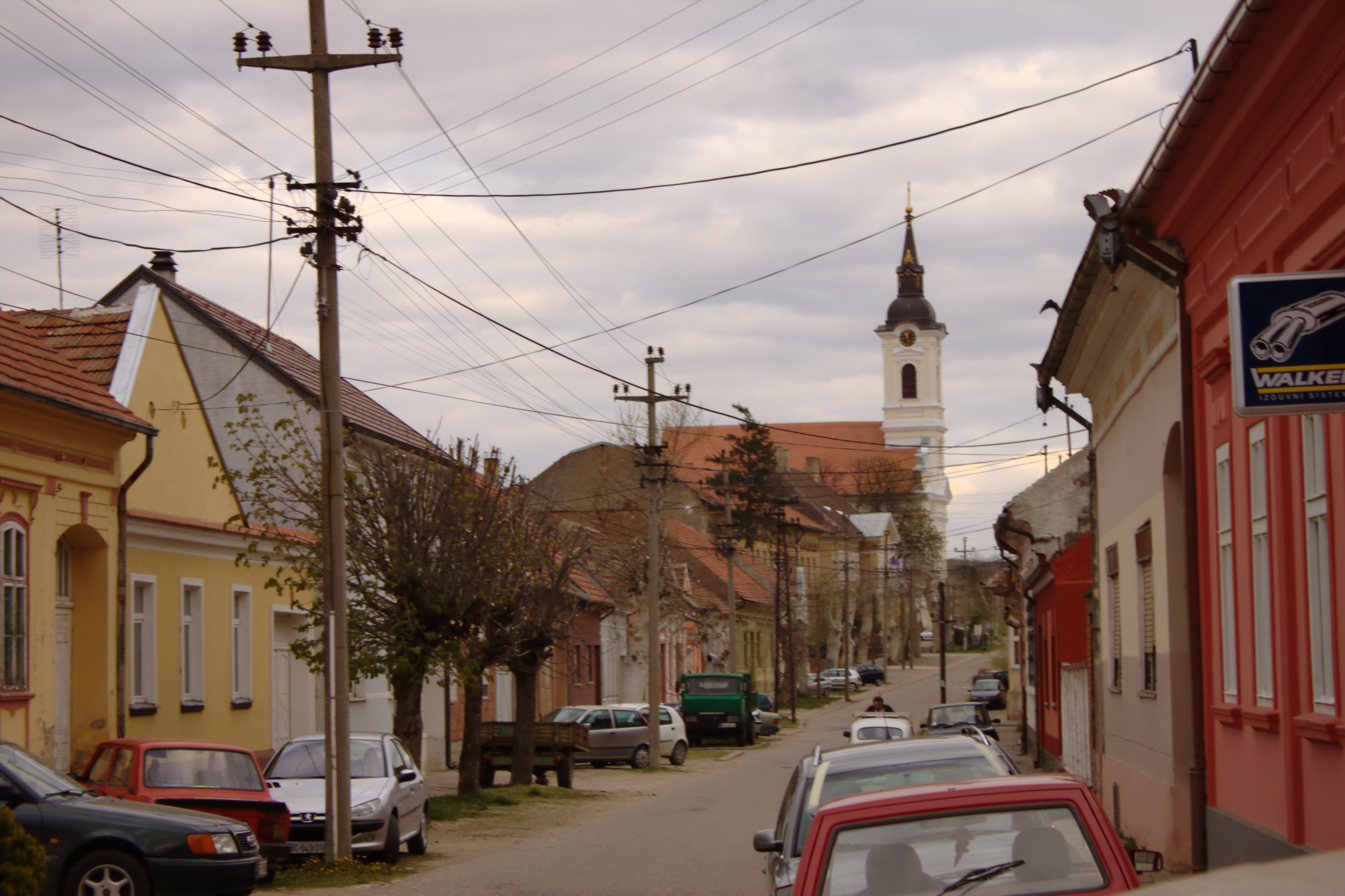
Bela Crkva street

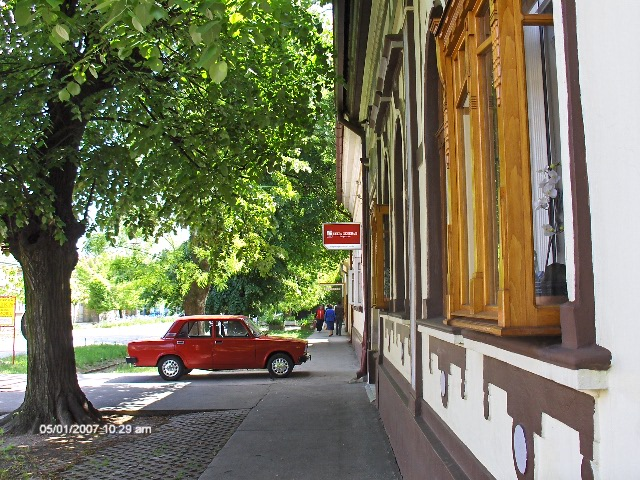
A typical sight in Bela Crkva, Vojvodina

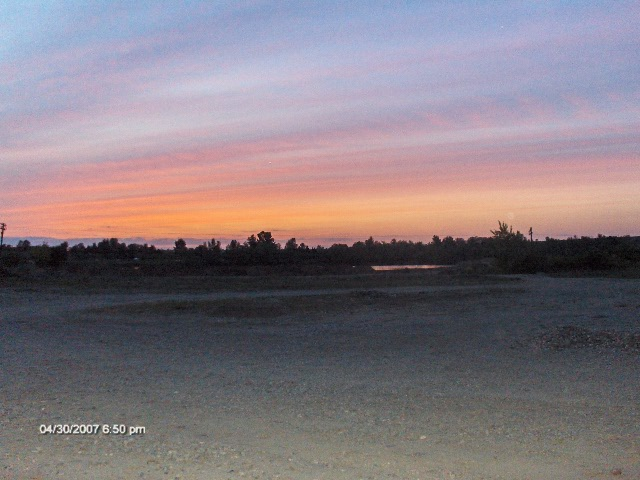
One of the lakes of Bela Crkva

== See also ==
- List of places in Serbia
- List of cities, towns and villages in Vojvodina
- Historical Archive of Bela Crkva
