= Banatska Subotica =

Banatska Subotica Банатска Суботица
- Village (Selo)
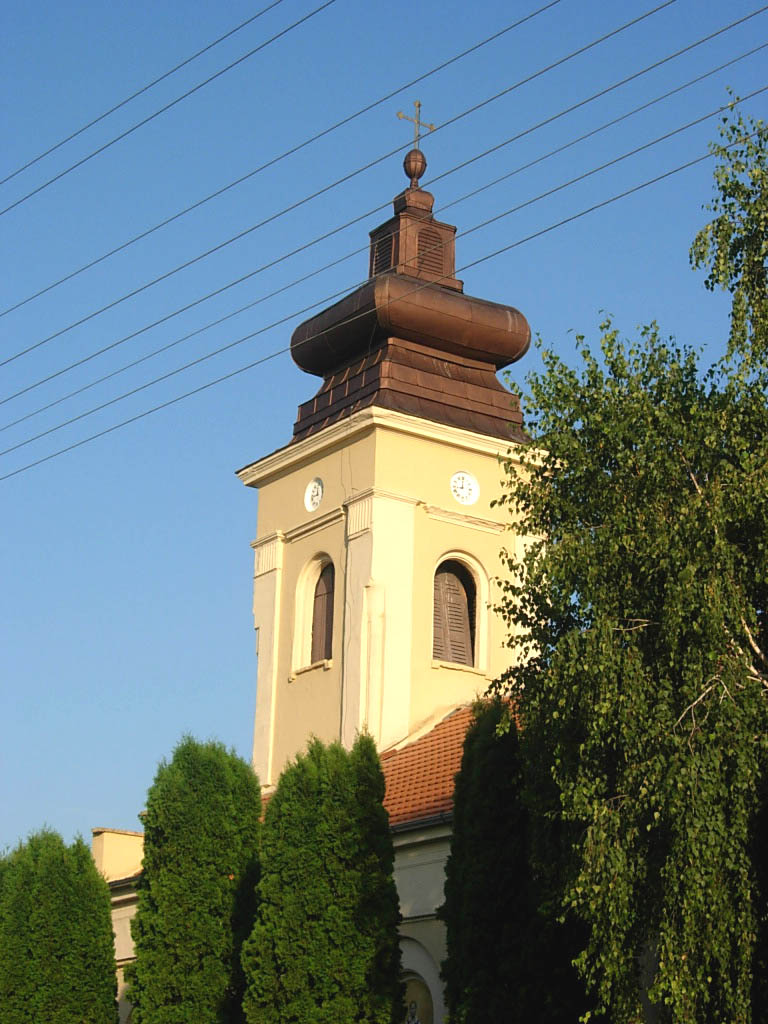
- The Orthodox church.

- Location of Banatska Subotica within Serbia Banatska Subotica (Serbia) Banatska Subotica (Europe)
- Coordinates: 44°58′35″N 21°20′21″E
- Country: Serbia
- Province: Vojvodina
- District: South Banat
- Municipality: Bela Crkva
- Elevation: 80 m (260 ft)

Population (2002)
  - Banatska Subotica: 200
- Time zone: UTC+1 (CET)
  - Summer (DST): UTC+2 (CEST)
- Postal code: 26327
- Area code: +381(0)13
- Car plates: VŠ

Banatska Subotica (Serbian Cyrillic: Банатска Суботица) is a village in Serbia. It is located in the Bela Crkva municipality, in the South Banat District, Vojvodina province. The village has a Serb ethnic majority (85%) and a population of 200 (2002 census).

== Historical population ==
- 1961: 505
- 1971: 479
- 1981: 372
- 1991: 280

== See also ==
- List of places in Serbia
- List of cities, towns and villages in Vojvodina
