= Jasenovo, Bela Crkva =

Jasenovo Јасеново
- Village (Selo)
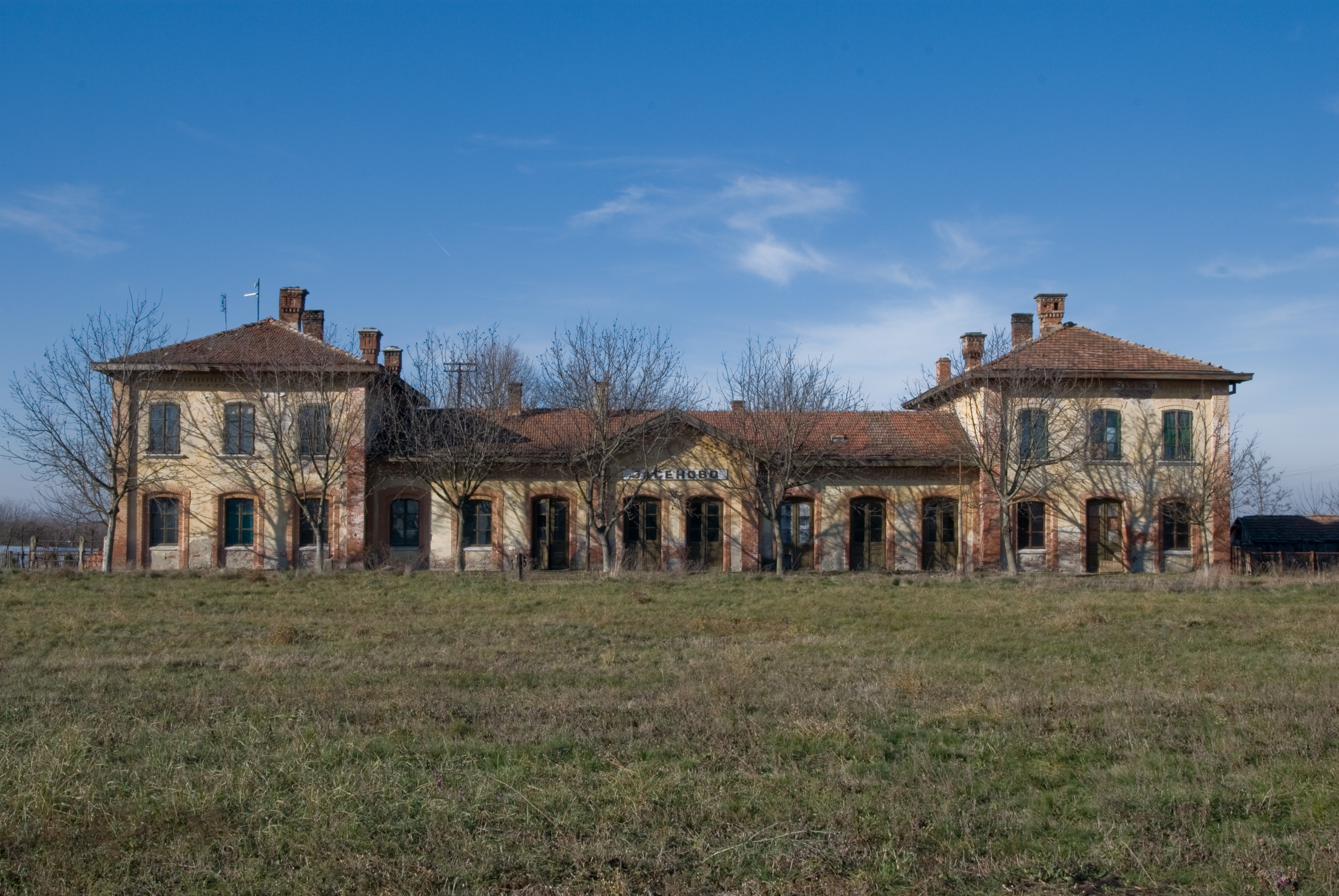
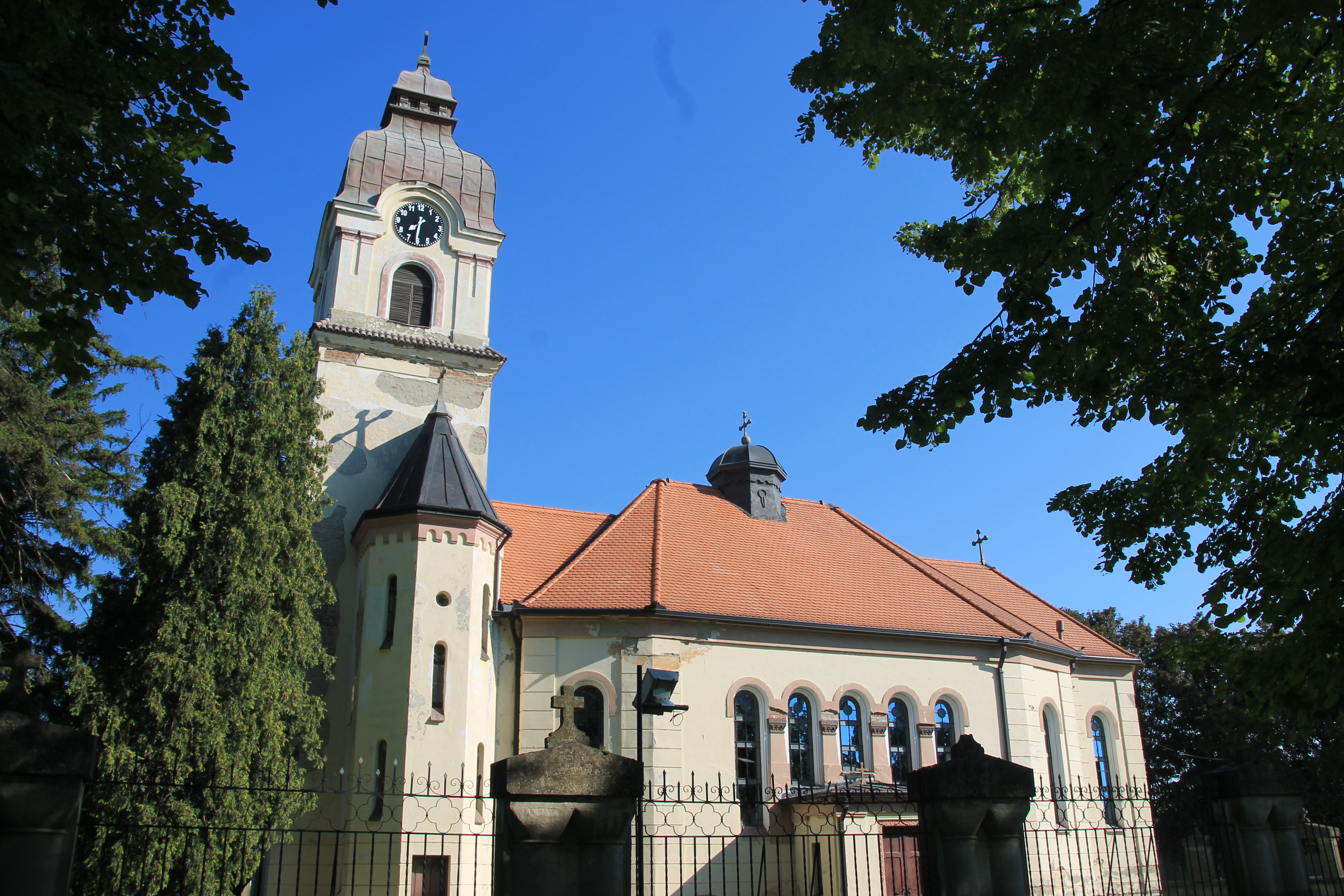
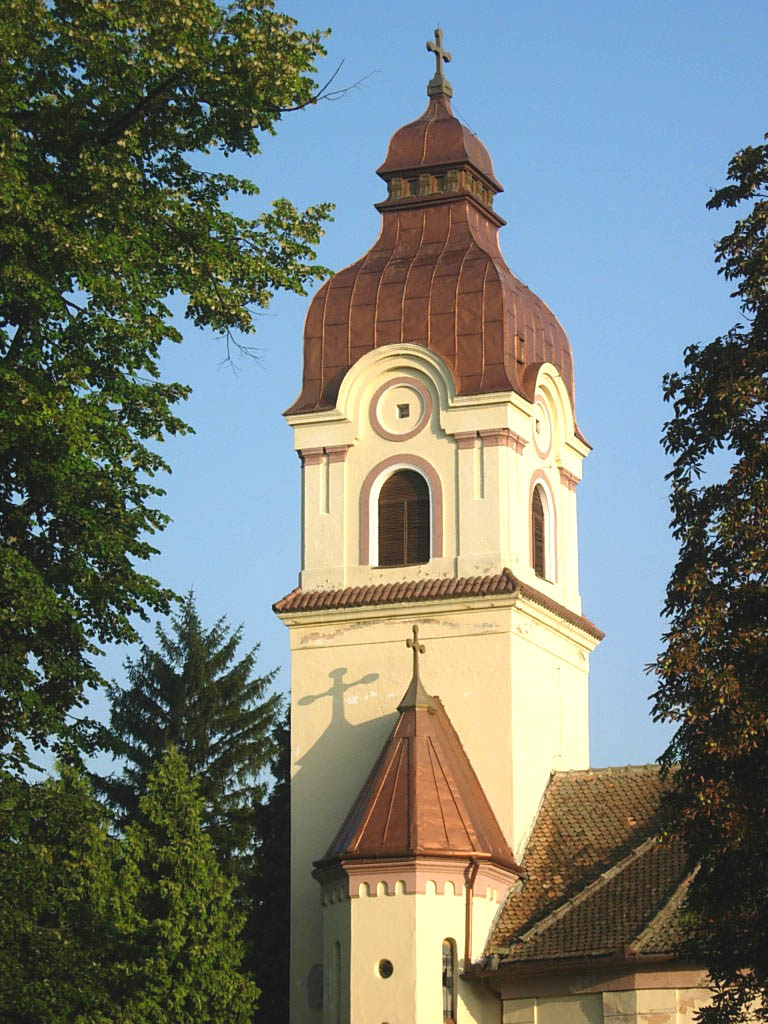
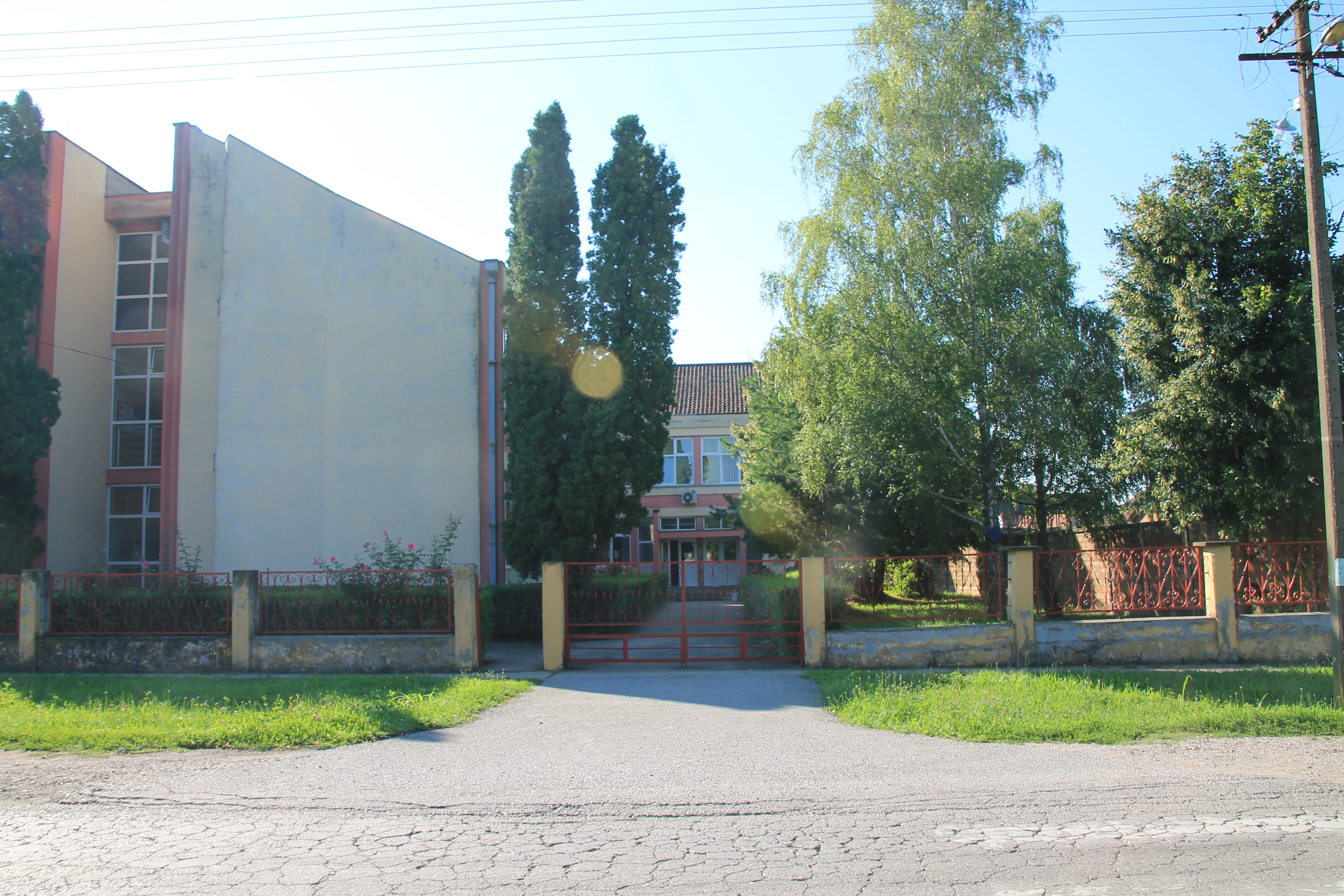
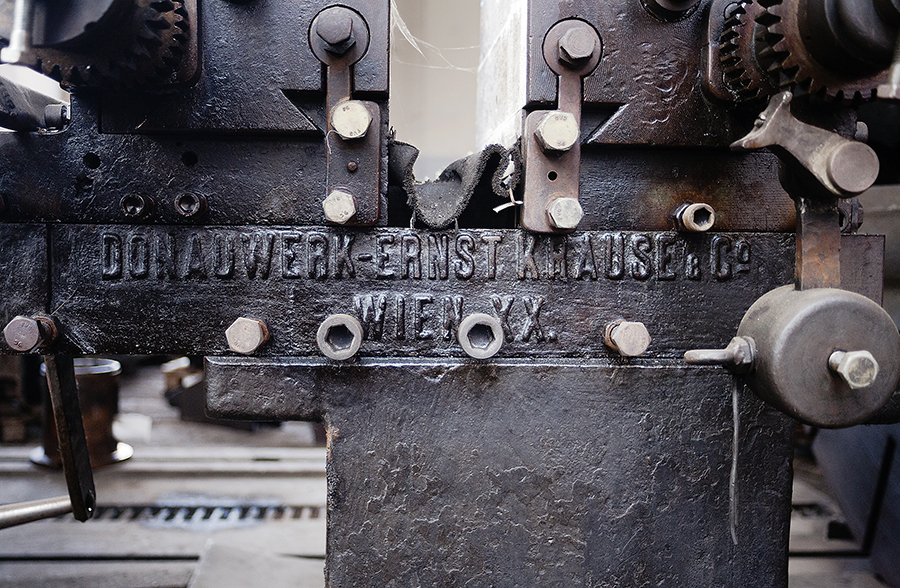
- Jasenovo

- Location of Jasenovo within Serbia Jasenovo (Serbia) Jasenovo (Europe)
- Coordinates: 44°55′35″N 21°17′22″E
- Country: Serbia
- Province: Vojvodina
- District: South Banat
- Municipality: Bela Crkva
- Elevation: 73 m (240 ft)

Population (2002)
  - Jasenovo: 1,446
- Time zone: UTC+1 (CET)
  - Summer (DST): UTC+2 (CEST)
- Postal code: 26346
- Area code: +381(0)13
- Car plates: VŠ

Jasenovo (Serbian Cyrillic: Јасеново) is a village in Serbia. It is situated in the Bela Crkva municipality, in the South Banat District, Vojvodina province. The village has a Serb ethnic majority (84.37%) and a population of 1,446 (2002 census).

== Historical population ==
- 1961: 2,333
- 1971: 2,108
- 1981: 2,062
- 1991: 1,927
- 2002: 1,446
- 2011: 1,243

== See also ==
- List of places in Serbia
- List of cities, towns and villages in Vojvodina
