= Croatia–Romania relations =

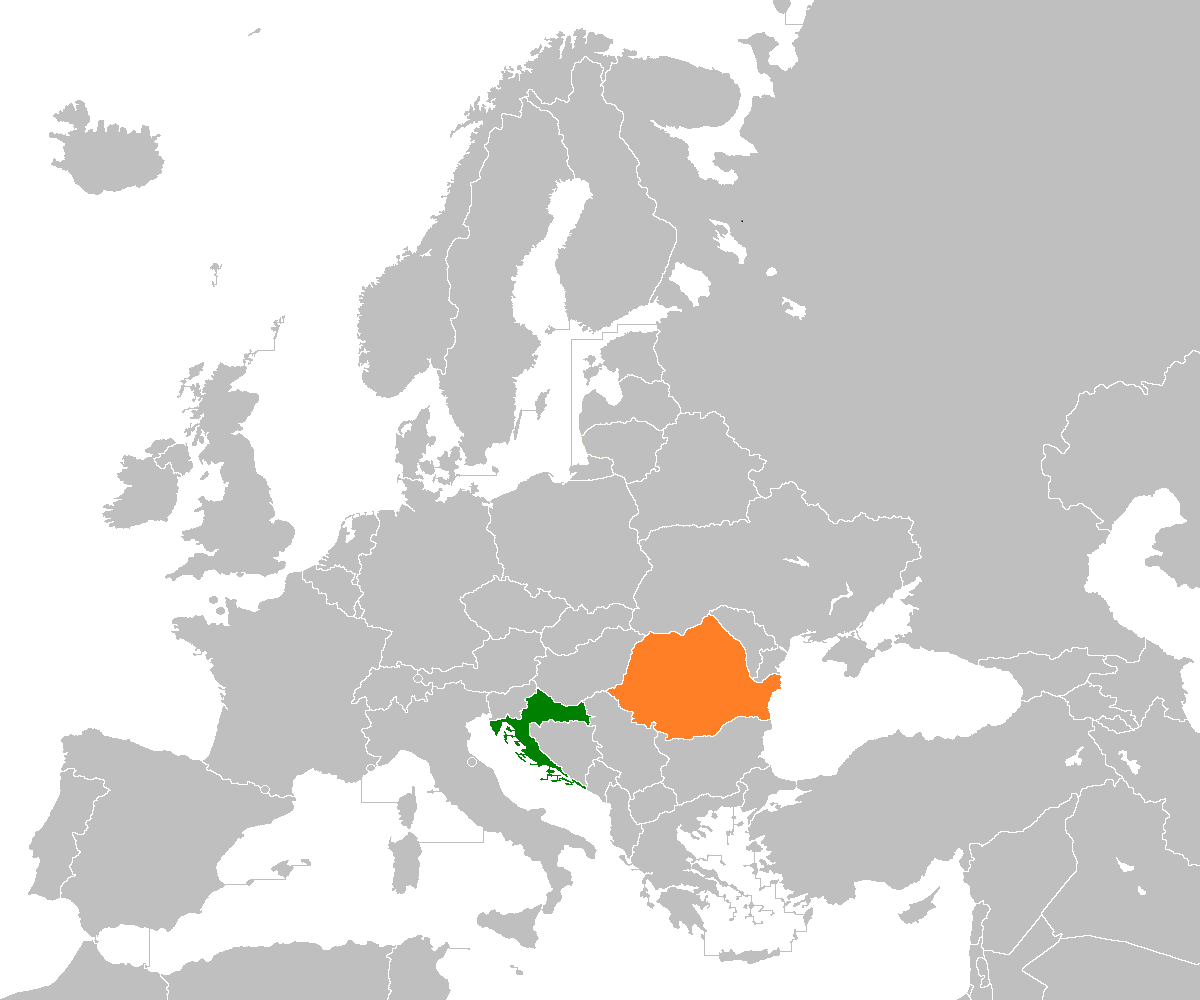

- Croatia: Romania

Diplomatic mission
- Bucharest (embassy): Zagreb (embassy), Rijeka (consulate), Split (consulate)

Croatia–Romania relations are the foreign relations between Croatia and Romania. Both nations are members of the European Union and NATO. Both countries established relations on 29 August 1992.

== History ==
During the Second World War, Croatia and Romania, as well as Slovakia, created a pact against Hungarian expansion. In addition, during the war, Slovak troops and Croatian air and naval forces operated amicably from Romanian soil. A similar pact, the interwar Little Entente, had been signed before between Romania, Yugoslavia (which included most of today's Croatia) and Czechoslovakia.

Currently, Romania has an embassy in Zagreb and two consulates in Rijeka and Split. In the other hand, Croatia has an embassy in Bucharest. Croatia and Romania have concluded a total of 47 treaties and acts, of which 38 are in force.

In 2019, during a meeting between the Croatian foreign minister Marija Pejčinović Burić and her Romanian counterpart Teodor Meleșcanu, they said that "relations between Croatia and Romania are improving". Both reported being satisfied with the treatment of their respective minorities. They said that Croatia and Romania "share similar goals", such as entering the Schengen Area and eurozone.

== Ethnic minorities ==
In Romania, in the region of Banat, there is a population of Croats (Krashovani). They make up one of the smallest minorities in the country, with a number of 6,807 according to the 2002 census. More than 5,500 Krashovani live in communes of Carașova and Lupac in the Caraș-Severin County, where they represent around 90% of the population. These communes are made up of seven villages, Carașova itself, Nermed, Clocotici, Iabalcea, Rafnic, Lupac itself and Vodnic. Here, the Croatian language is not only used among the family, but in the everyday environment, being used in public institutions alongside Romanian. In fact, Romanian is taught to children at the entrance to kindergarten, not before. The rest of the Croats outside these villages are mostly found in Cenei, Checea and Recaș, which are also in Banat. It is known that the Croats of Romania emigrated to Banat centuries ago, but it is unknown when exactly the largest community of them, that of Carașova and Lupac, did so.

The Istro-Romanians of Croatia live in eight villages in Istria, in which they do not form the majority. There are about 120 Istro-Romanians in these villages. Another 450 live in cities and towns in Croatia and about 500 abroad, both the result of emigration. The Istro-Romanian language is not used in media, religion and other domains, causing it to lose value and fall into disuse. Language shift is advanced, more in some villages than in others. Romania officially takes responsibility for this ethnic group, claiming that they are "Romanians abroad" and that they are part of the Romanian cultural and linguistic vein. On 8 November 2016, the school of the village of Šušnjevica was renovated and reopened. This project cost 451,600 kunas (around 61,100 euros). Romania founded part of it, giving 100,000 kunas (around 13,550 euros). On this day, the then Romanian ambassador to Croatia Constantin Mihail Grigorie and the one before him, Cosmin Dinescu, as well as regional authorities of the Istria County, attended the inauguration. The Istro-Romanians could have migrated from Transylvania to Istria or originated from the Morlachs of Dalmatia, which in turn were not indigenous of there. Their communities are more in danger than ever, and could disappear in the next decades.

== See also ==
- Foreign relations of Croatia
- Foreign relations of Romania
- Romania–Yugoslavia relations
