= Krassó-Szörény County =

County of the Kingdom of Hungary

Krassó-Szörény County Comitatus Krassovinis et Severinensis (Latin) Krassó-Szörény vármegye (Hungarian) Komitat Karasch-Severin (German) Comitatul Caraș-Severin (Romanian)
- County of the Kingdom of Hungary
- 1881–1920
- Coat of arms

- Capital: Lugos
- Area
  - Coordinates: 45°41′N 21°54′E
  - 1910: 11,074 km^{2} (4,276 sq mi)
- Population
  - 1910: 466,147
- History
  - Established: 1881
  - Treaty of Trianon: 4 June 1920
- Today part of: Romania; Serbia
- Lugoj is the current name of the capital

Krassó-Szörény (Hungarian: Krassó-Szörény, Romanian: Caraș-Severin, Serbian: Karaš-Severin or Караш-Северин) was an administrative county (comitatus) of the historic Kingdom of Hungary. Its territory is now mostly located in western Romania, with one very small part which is located in Serbia. The capital of the county was Lugos (present-day Lugoj).

== Geography ==
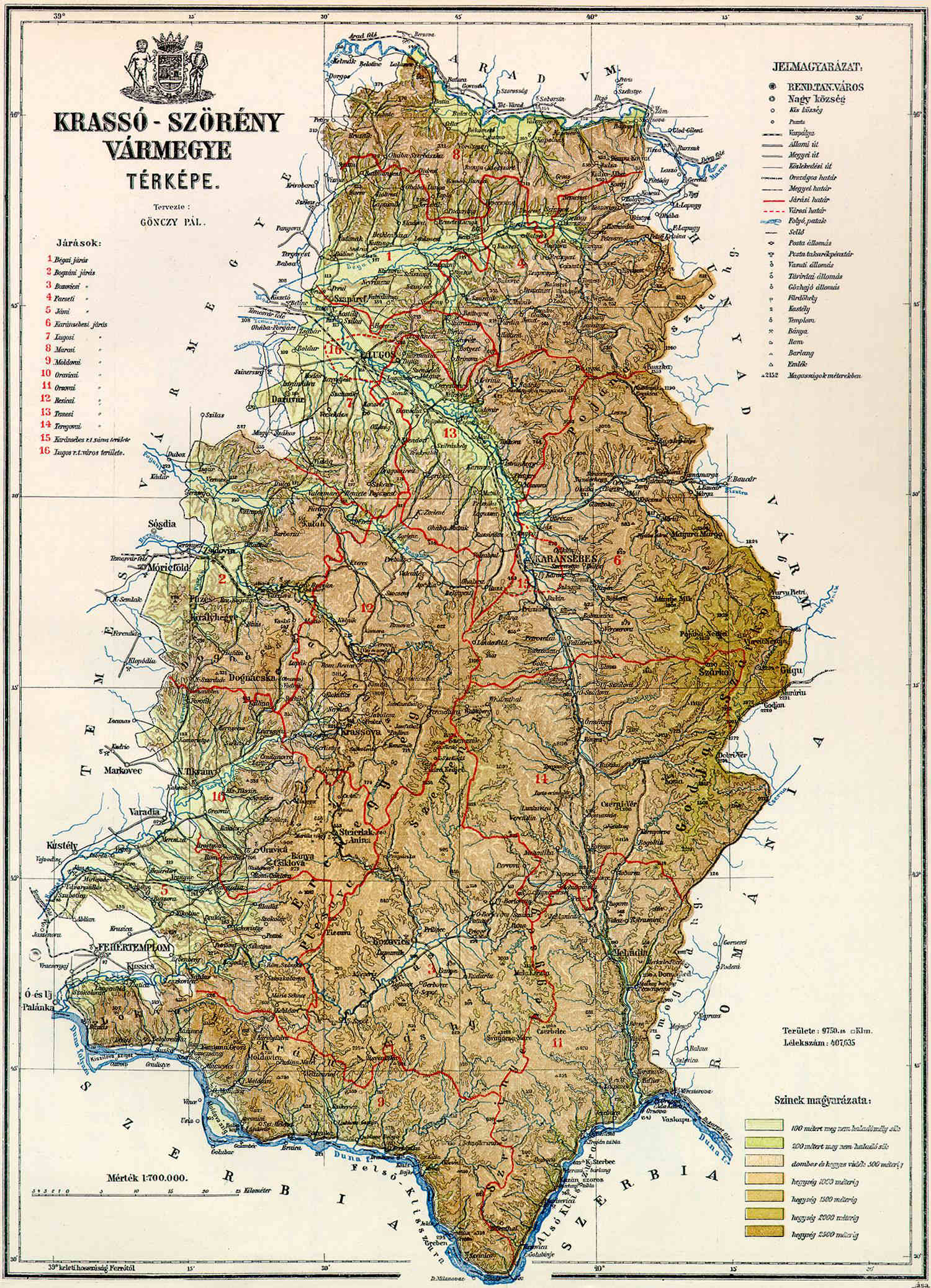
Krassó-Szörény County 1891

Krassó-Szörény County was located in the Banat region. It shared borders with the Kingdom of Serbia and the Hungarian counties of Temes, Arad and Hunyad. The river Danube formed its southern border, and the river Mureș its northern border. The rivers Bega, Timiș, Bârzava, Caraș, Nera and Cerna flowed through the county. Its area was 11,032 km^{2} (4,259 sq mi) around 1910.

== History ==
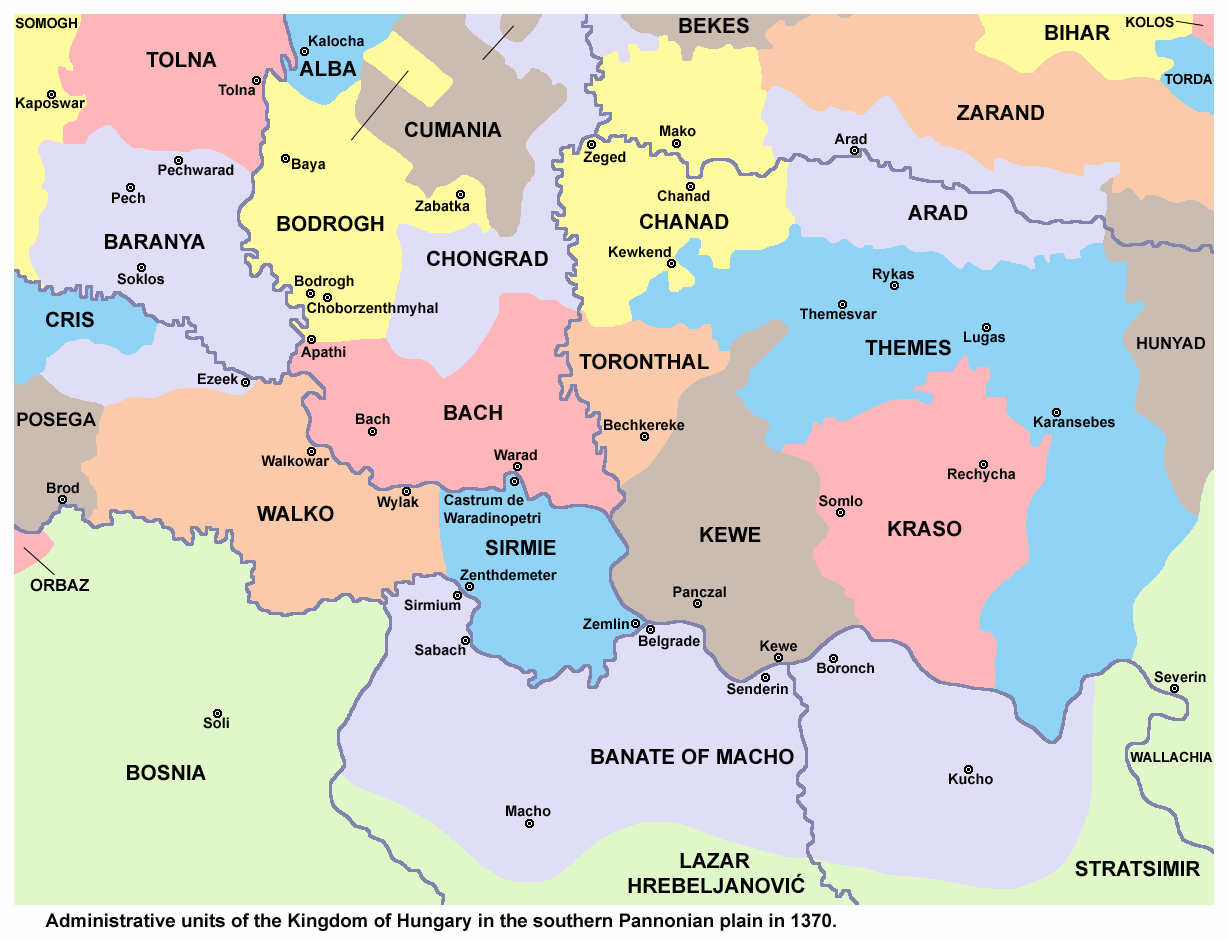
Krassó county in the 14th century

Krassó-Szörény county was formed in 1881 by uniting the counties of Krassó (its center was Lugos/Lugoj) and Szörény (its center was Karánsebes/Caransebeș). Previously, Krassó County had been re-established in 1779, with significantly different borders than in medieval times, while Szörény County had only been established in 1873 (it was the shortest-lived county in the modern Kingdom of Hungary), mostly on the territory of the former Vlach Regiment of the Banat Military Frontier. Much of those regions were temporarily liberated from Ottoman rule already during the Great Turkish War (1683-1699), but mighty Timișoara Fortress remained in Ottoman hands, and thus under the Treaty of Karlowitz (1699) the entire territory was returned to the Ottomans. All of those regions, including Lugos and Karánsebes, were finally captured by the Habsburg monarchy during the next Austro-Turkish War (1716–1718). Under the Treaty of Passarowitz (1718) that region became a permanent Habsburg possession, and was included into the newly created Habsburg province, called the Banat of Temeswar.

All of those regions were culturally diverse, both ethnically and linguistically (inhabited by Germans, Hungarians, Romanians, Serbs and other groups), and also diverse in terms of religious composition (Eastern Orthodox, Protestant and Roman Catholic Christians, and also Jews).

Since the re-creation of the Krassó County in 1779, its administration was dominated by German and Hungarian elites, while the vast majority of population were Vlachs (Romanians). Between 1849 and 1860, the territory of the county was part of the Voivodeship of Serbia and Temes Banat, a separate Austrian crownland. During that period, the county did not exist since the Voivodeship was divided into districts. After the Voivodeship was abolished in 1860, the area was again incorporated into the Habsburg Kingdom of Hungary. The Krassó County was re-created in January 1861. In 1873, when the Banat Military Frontier was finally dissolved, its eastern part was transformed into the newly created Szörény County. Only in 1886, both counties were united into the Krassó-Szörény County.

In the autumn of 1918, at the very end of the First World War, the ephemeral Banat Republic was proclaimed, with center in Temesvár (Timișoara), and also claiming the Krassó-Szörény county, but that attempt to create a Banatian state failed already after several days. Under the terms of the Armistice of Belgrade (13 November), armed forces of Austria-Hungary were obligated to retreated from various territories, including the Krassó-Szörény county, and the region was possessed by the Allied Army of the Orient, thus allowing the French troops and the Serbian Royal Army to establish effective control south of the Baja-Szeged-Mureș line, while in the same time Romanian Royal Army was liberating Transylvania.

By that time, the process of political dissolution of Austria-Hungary already reached its final stages, and on 16 November the First Hungarian Republic was proclaimed in Budapest, thus ending the nine centuries old Kingdom of Hungary. In the same time, local Serbian and other Slavic leaders from regions to the west organized the Great People's Assembly of Serbs, Bunjevci and other Slavs in Banat, Bačka and Baranja, that was held on 25 November in Novi Sad, and proclaimed the unification of those regions (Banat, Bačka and Baranja, with pretensions to some parts of Krassó-Szörény county), into the Kingdom of Serbia. Several days later, on 1 December 1918, the Kingdom of Serbs, Croats and Slovenes was proclaimed, encompassing Serbia with Montenegro, and all South Slavic provinces of the former Austria-Hungary. On the same day, representatives of Romanian people held the Great National Assembly of Alba Iulia, and proclaimed unification with the Kingdom of Romania. Thus, three countries laid claims on the Krassó-Szörény county, the Hungarian Republic and the newly united kingdoms, Yugoslav and Romanian.

The question was settled by the Paris Peace Conference (1919): most of the county was assigned to Romania, with one small part (villages of Banatska Subotica and Dobričevo) which was assigned to the Kingdom of Serbs, Croats and Slovenes (Yugoslavia). Other questions were finalized by the Treaty of Trianon (1920), and later border arrangements between Romania and Yugoslavia. The north of the county (including Lugoj) is now part of the Romanian county of Timiș, except for a 10 km (6.2 mi) wide strip along the Mureș River, which is in Arad County. The rest now forms Caraș-Severin County, except for the city Orșova, which is in Mehedinți County.

== Demographics ==
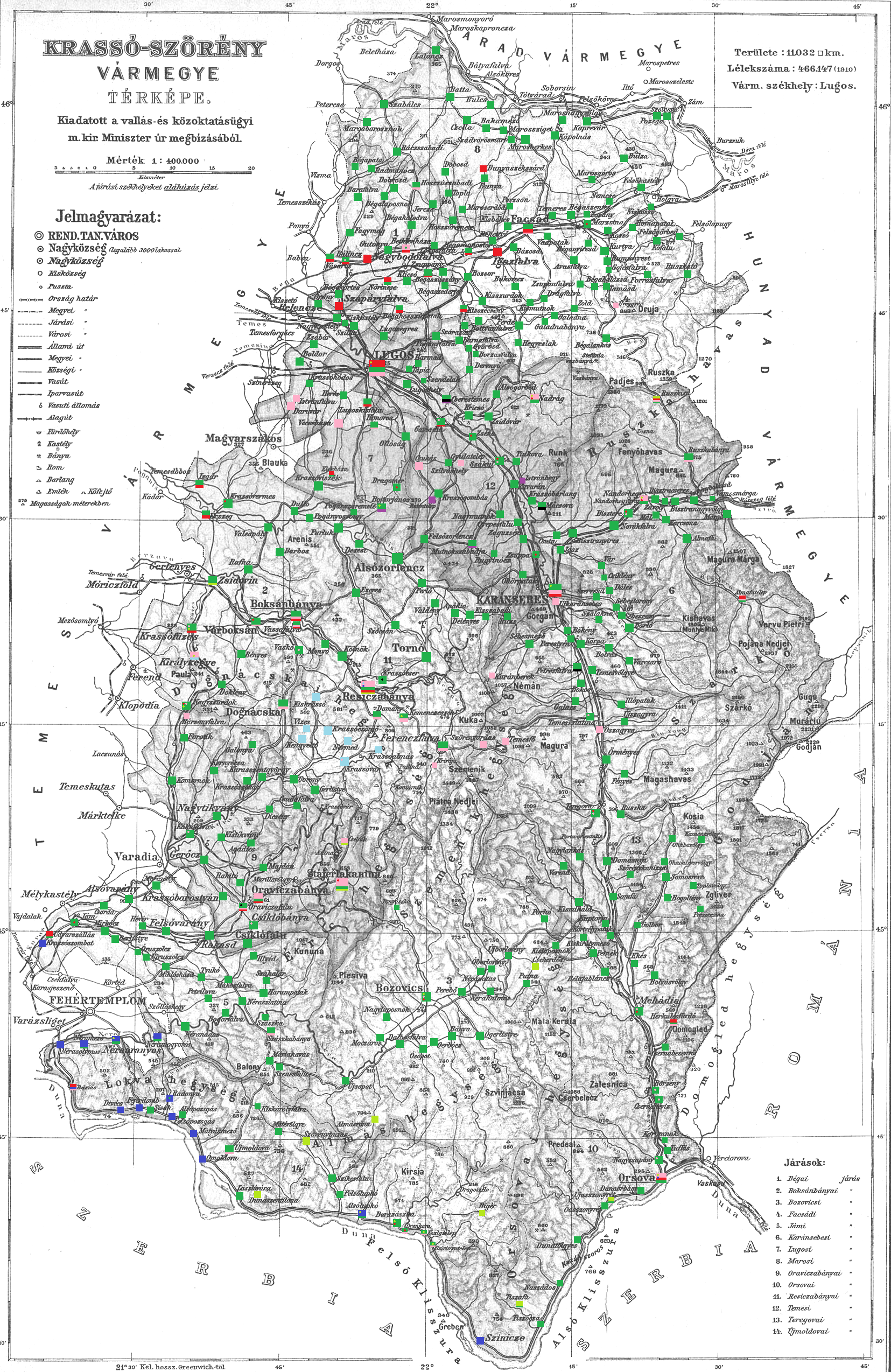
Ethnic map of the county with data of the 1910 census (see the key in the description).

Population by mother tongue (Note: Only linguistic communities > 1% are displayed.)
Census	Total	Romanian	German	Hungarian	Serbian	Slovak	Croatian	Other or unknown
1880	381,304	289,849 (78.35%)	37,833 (10.23%)	7,201 (1.95%)	18,686 (5.05%) (Note: Serbian and Croatian.)	6,247 (1.69%)	–	10,117 (2.73%)
1890	407,635	311,335 (76.38%)	48,058 (11.79%)	10,879 (2.67%)	11,862 (2.91%)	5,723 (1.40%)	5,018 (1.23%) (Note: includes Krashovani)	14,760 (3.62%)
1900	443,001	328,371 (74.12%)	55,256 (12.47%)	21,439 (4.84%)	13,138 (2.97%)	3,831 (0.86%)	279 (0.06%)	20,687 (4.67%)
1910	466,147	336,082 (72.10%)	55,883 (11.99%)	33,787 (7.25%)	14,674 (3.15%)	2,908 (0.62%)	319 (0.07%)	22,494 (4.83%) (Note: Mostly Krashovani, Czech and Roma.)

Population by religion (Note: Only religious communities > 1% are displayed.)
Census	Total	Eastern Orthodox	Roman Catholic	Greek Catholic	Calvinist	Jewish	Other or unknown
1880	381,304	295,820 (77.58%)	62,080 (16.28%)	16,590 (4.35%)	1,619 (0.42%)	3,243 (0.85%)	1,952 (0.51%)
1890	407,635	306,023 (75.07%)	73,817 (18.11%)	18,949 (4.65%)	3,053 (0.75%)	3,713 (0.91%)	2,080 (0.51%)
1900	443,001	325,613 (73.50%)	84,748 (19.13%)	18,262 (4.12%)	7,792 (1.76%)	4,375 (0.99%)	2,211 (0.50%)
1910	466,147	337,153 (72.33%)	90,479 (19.41%)	20,006 (4.29%)	10,400 (2.23%)	4,795 (1.03%)	3,314 (0.71%)

== Subdivisions ==
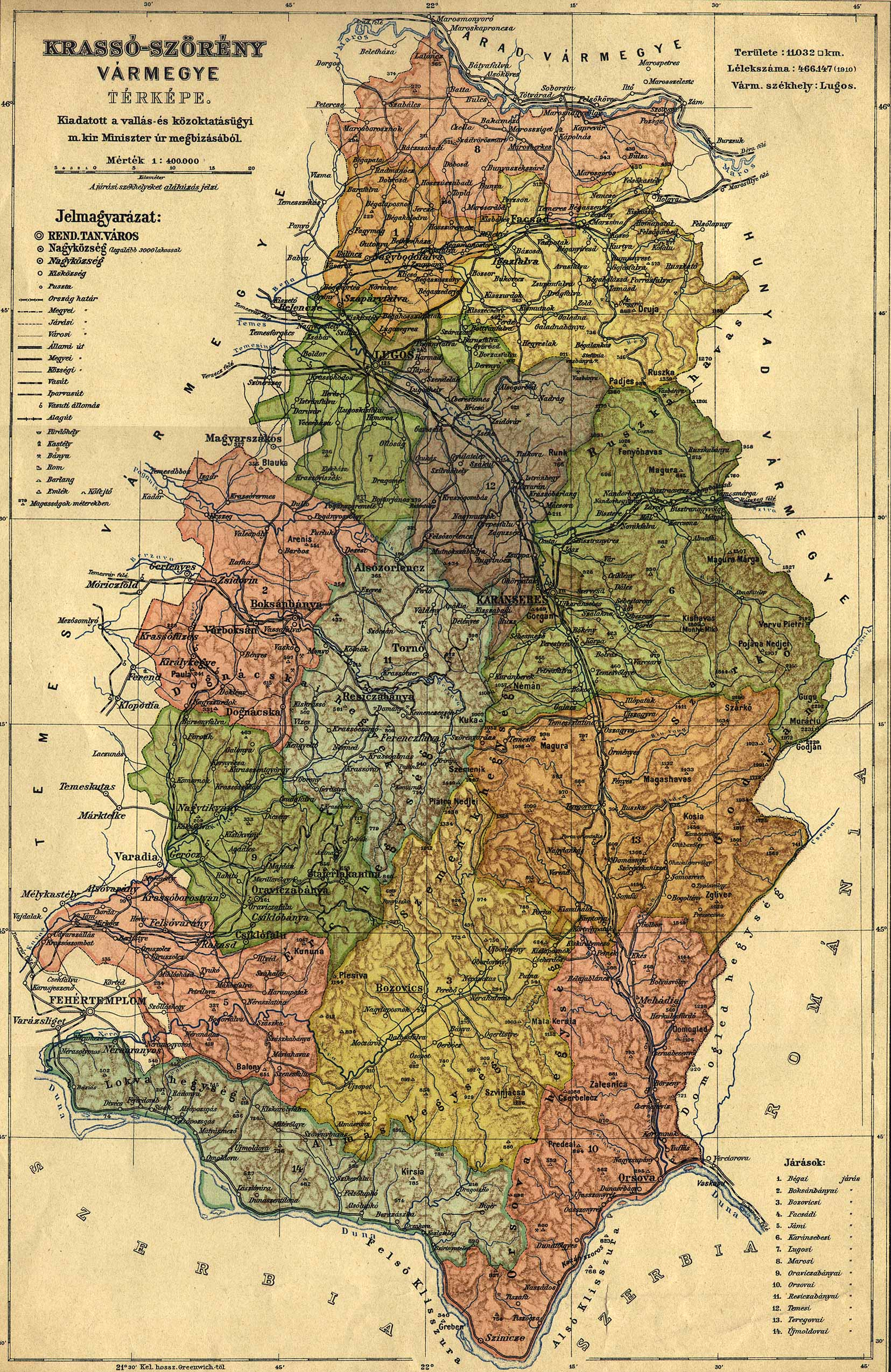
Krasso-Szoreny County (administrative division)

In the early 20th century, the subdivisions of Krassó-Szörény county were:

Districts (járás)
District	Capital
Béga	Bálinc (now Balinț)
Boksanbánya	Boksanbánya (now Bocșa Montană)
Bozovics	Bozovics (now Bozovici)
Facsád	Facsád (now Făget)
Jám	Jám (now Iam)
Karánsebes	Karánsebes (now Caransebeș)
Lugos	Lugos (now Lugoj)
Maros	Marosberkes (now Birchiș)
Oravicabánya	Oravicabánya (now Oravița)
Orsova	Orsova (now Orșova)
Resicabánya	Resicabánya (now Reșița)
Temes	Szákul (now Sacu)
Teregova	Teregova (now Teregova)
Újmoldova	Újmoldova (now Moldova Nouă)
Urban districts (rendezett tanácsú város)
Karánsebes (now Caransebeș)
Lugos (now Lugoj)

== See also ==
- History of Banat
- Declaratory Rescript of the Illyrian Nation

== Sources ==
- Bocşan, Nicolae (2015). "Illyrian privileges and the Romanians from the Banat" (PDF). Banatica. 25: 243–258. Archived from the original on 2 January 2019.
- Ćirković, Sima (2004). The Serbs. Malden: Blackwell Publishing.
- Dabić, Vojin S. (2011). "The Habsburg-Ottoman War of 1716–1718 and Demographic Changes in the War-Afflicted Territories". The Peace of Passarowitz, 1718. West Lafayette: Purdue University Press. pp. 191–208.
- Dávid, Géza (1999). "The Eyalet of temesvár in the Eighteenth Century". Oriente Moderno. 79 (18): 113–128.
- Gavrilović, Vladan (2023). "The Serbian Vojvodina: Idea and borders until 1918". Istraživanja: Journal of historical researches. 34: 112–120.
- Ilić-Mandić, Jelena (2022). "Making the Border and Frontiersmen: Militarisation in Temeswarer Banat, 1764-1775". From medieval frontiers to early modern borders in Central and South-Eastern Europe. Berlin: Peter Lang Publishing. pp. 207–228.
- Krizman, Bogdan (1970). "The Belgrade Armistice of 13 November 1918". The Slavonic and East European Review. 48 (110): 67–87.
