= Vicinic =

Vicinic Vičinik
- Location within Serbia Location within Romania
- Native name: Vicinic (Romanian); Вичиник / Vičinik (Serbian)

Location
- Countries: Romania; Serbia
- County / Province: Caraș-Severin; Vojvodina

Physical characteristics
- Source: Anina Mountains
  - location: Romania
- Mouth: Karaš
  - location: Serbia
  - coordinates: 44.9985°N 21.3559°E

Basin features
- Progression: Karaš→ Danube→ Black Sea
- Tributaries
  - left: Iam
  - right: Mășcășeni

The Vicinic (in Romanian) or Vičinik (in Serbian, also Cyrillic: Вичиник) is a left tributary of the river Karaš in Romania and Serbia. Its source and the greatest part of the river are located in Romania. There it flows through the villages Ilidia, Ciuchici, Nicolinț, Rusova Nouă, Rusova Veche, Berliște, Milcoveni, and Iam. On its lower reach it crosses the border into Serbia before joining the Karaš in Dobričevo. In Romania, its length is 41 km (25 mi) and its basin size is 157 km^{2} (61 sq mi).
