= Barheș =

- Location within Romania

Location
- Country: Romania
- Counties: Caraș-Severin County
- Villages: Cârnecea

Physical characteristics
- Mouth: Caraș
  - coordinates: 45.1228°N 21.6055°E
- Length: 18 km (11 mi)
- Basin size: 52 km^{2} (20 sq mi)

Basin features
- Progression: Karaš→ Danube→ Black Sea
- Tributaries
  - right: Sârbul

The Barheș (also: Barcheș) is a right tributary of the river Caraș (Karaš) in Romania. It flows into the Caraș in Grădinari. Its length is 18 km (11 mi) and its basin size is 52 km^{2} (20 sq mi).
