= Jitin =

- Location within Romania

Location
- Country: Romania
- Counties: Caraș-Severin County
- Villages: Ciudanovița, Jitin

Physical characteristics
- Mouth: Caraș
  - coordinates: 45.1534°N 21.6753°E
- Length: 23 km (14 mi)
- Basin size: 67 km^{2} (26 sq mi)

Basin features
- Progression: Karaš→ Danube→ Black Sea
- Tributaries
  - right: Izvor

The Jitin is a left tributary of the river Caraș (Karaš) in Romania. It discharges into the Caraș near Ticvaniu Mare. Its length is 23 km (14 mi) and its basin size is 67 km^{2} (26 sq mi).
