= Comarnic (river) =

- Location within Romania

Location
- Country: Romania
- Counties: Caraș-Severin County

Physical characteristics
- Mouth: Caraș
  - coordinates: 45.1788°N 21.9279°E
- Length: 5 km (3.1 mi)
- Basin size: 17 km^{2} (6.6 sq mi)

Basin features
- Progression: Karaš→ Danube→ Black Sea
- Tributaries
  - left: Stredneg, Ponicova
  - right: Toplița

The Comarnic is a tributary of the river Caraș in Romania. It discharges into the Caraș upstream from Carașova. Its length is 5 km (3.1 mi) and its basin size is 17 km^{2} (6.6 sq mi). It flows through the Semenic-Caraș Gorge National Park.
