= Oravița (river) =

- Location within Romania

Location
- Country: Romania
- Counties: Caraș-Severin County
- Villages: Oravița, Broșteni, Greoni

Physical characteristics
- Mouth: Lișava
  - location: Greoni
  - coordinates: 45.0847°N 21.6161°E
- Length: 18 km (11 mi)
- Basin size: 32 km^{2} (12 sq mi)

Basin features
- Progression: Lișava→ Karaš→ Danube→ Black Sea

The Oravița is a left tributary of the river Lișava in Romania. It flows into the Lișava in Greoni. Its length is 18 km (11 mi) and its basin size is 32 km^{2} (12 sq mi).
