= Gârliște =

Tributary of the river Karaš in Romania

- Location within Romania

Location
- Country: Romania
- Counties: Caraș-Severin County
- Villages: Anina, Gârliște

Physical characteristics
- Source: Anina
- Mouth: Caraș
  - coordinates: 45.1968°N 21.7970°E
- Length: 20 km (12 mi)
- Basin size: 50 km^{2} (19 sq mi)

Basin features
- Progression: Karaš→ Danube→ Black Sea
- Tributaries
  - left: Terezia, Valea Mare
  - right: Celnicu Mare, Celnicu Mic, Jelnița

The Gârliște is a left tributary of the river Caraș (Karaš) in Romania. It discharges into the Caraș near the village Gârliște. Its length is 20 km (12 mi) and its basin size is 50 km^{2} (19 sq mi).
