= Buhui =

- Location within Romania

Location
- Country: Romania
- Counties: Caraș-Severin County

Physical characteristics
- Mouth: Caraș
  - coordinates: 45.1618°N 21.9280°E
- Length: 17 km (11 mi)
- Basin size: 37 km^{2} (14 sq mi)

Basin features
- Progression: Karaš→ Danube→ Black Sea
- Tributaries
  - right: Glăvan, Certeț

The Buhui is a left tributary of the river Caraș (Karaš) in Romania. It discharges into the Caraș upstream from Carașova. Its length is 17 km (11 mi) and its basin size is 37 km^{2} (14 sq mi). The river first flows through Lake Buhui. Thereafter it flows through the Buhui Cave and, after emerging from the cave, flows through a reach of narrow gorges in the Semenic-Cheile Carașului National Park before joining the Caraș.
