= Damaschin =

Damaschin is a Romanian-language masculine given name and a surname. It may refer to:

- Damaschin Bojincă (1802–1869), Imperial Austrian-born Moldavian writer and jurist
- Marian Damaschin (born 1965), Romanian retired footballer
