= Lișava =

- Location within Romania

Location
- Country: Romania
- Counties: Caraș-Severin County
- Villages: Brădișoru de Jos, Greoni

Physical characteristics
- Source: Anina Mountains
- Mouth: Caraș
  - location: Vărădia
  - coordinates: 45.0819°N 21.5482°E
- Length: 27 km (17 mi)
- Basin size: 151 km^{2} (58 sq mi)

Basin features
- Progression: Karaš→ Danube→ Black Sea
- Tributaries
  - left: Natra, Răchitova, Oravița
  - right: Dobra, Gladie

The Lișava is a left tributary of the river Caraș (Karaš) in Romania. It discharges into the Caraș in Vărădia. Its length is 27 km (17 mi) and its basin size is 151 km^{2} (58 sq mi).
