= Nermed =

- Location within Romania

Location
- Country: Romania
- Counties: Caraș-Severin County
- Villages: Nermed

Physical characteristics
- Mouth: Gelug
  - coordinates: 45.2075°N 21.81758°E
- Length: 11 km (6.8 mi)
- Basin size: 25 km^{2} (9.7 sq mi)

Basin features
- Progression: Gelug→ Karaš→ Danube→ Black Sea

The Nermed is a left tributary of the river Gelug in Romania. It flows into the Gelug west of Carașova. Its length is 11 km (6.8 mi) and its basin size is 25 km^{2} (9.7 sq mi).
