= Gelug (river) =

River in Romania

Gelug Lupac
- Location within Romania

Location
- Country: Romania
- Counties: Caraș-Severin County
- Villages: Lupac

Physical characteristics
- Mouth: Caraș
  - coordinates: 45.1970°N 21.7923°E
- Length: 18 km (11 mi)
- Basin size: 95 km^{2} (37 sq mi)

Basin features
- Progression: Karaš→ Danube→ Black Sea
- Tributaries
  - left: Lupacul Mic, Stircovăț, Clocotici, Țerova, Nermed
  - right: Țiganca, Rafnic, Jupalnic

The Gelug (or Lupac) is a right tributary of the river Caraș (Karaš) in Romania. It discharges into the Caraș near Goruia. Its length is 18 km (11 mi) and its basin size is 95 km^{2} (37 sq mi).
