= Ciornovăț =

Ciornovăț Cernovăț
- Location within Romania

Location
- Country: Romania
- Counties: Caraș-Severin County
- Villages: Surducu Mare, Brezon, Forotic, Comorâște

Physical characteristics
- Mouth: Caraș
  - location: Vărădia
  - coordinates: 45.0913°N 21.5504°E
- Length: 33 km (21 mi)
- Basin size: 129 km^{2} (50 sq mi)

Basin features
- Progression: Karaš→ Danube→ Black Sea
- Tributaries
  - right: Osiac

The Ciornovăț (also: Cernovăț) is a right tributary of the river Caraș (Karaš) in Romania. It discharges into the Caraș in Vărădia. Its length is 33 km (21 mi) and its basin size is 129 km^{2} (50 sq mi).
