= Galonya =

Galonya is the Hungarian name for two villages in Romania:

- Calina village, Dognecea Commune, Caraş-Severin County
- Gălăoaia village, Răstolița Commune, Mureș County
