= Karaš =

Karaš Caraș
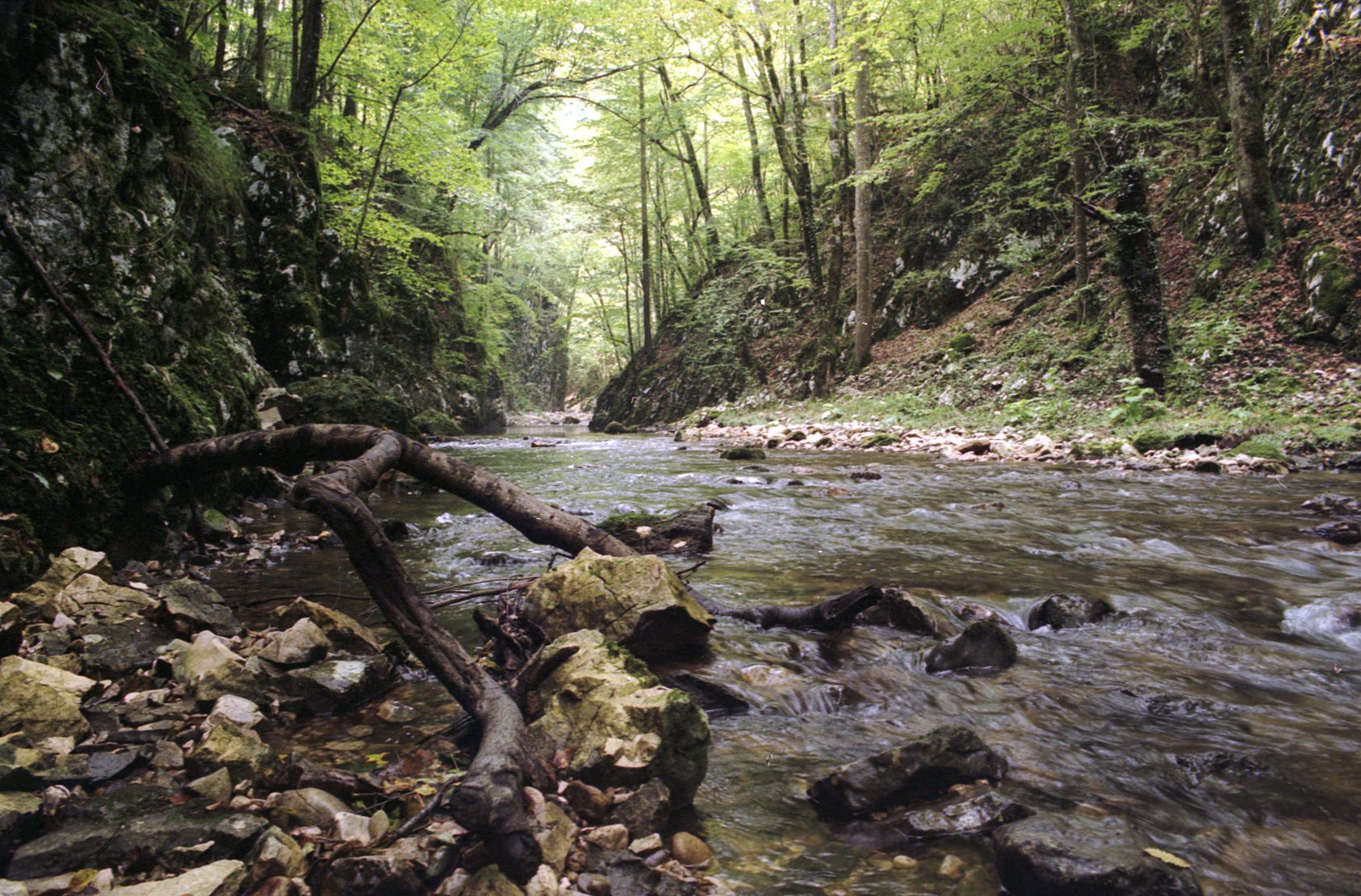
- The Karaš passing Semenic-Cheile Carașului National Park, Romania

- Location within Serbia Location within Romania
- Native name: Караш / Karaš (Serbian); Caraș (Romanian)

Location
- Countries: Romania; Serbia
- County / Province: Caraș-Severin; Vojvodina

Physical characteristics
- Source: Anina Mountains, Romania
  - coordinates: 45°05′05″N 21°55′21″E
- Mouth: Danube
  - location: near Banatska Palanka, Serbia
  - coordinates: 44°49′51″N 21°19′01″E
- Length: 110 km (68 mi)
- Basin size: 1,400 km^{2} (540 sq mi)

Basin features
- Progression: Danube→ Black Sea

The Karaš (in Serbian, also Cyrillic: Караш) or Caraș (in Romanian) is a 110-kilometre (68 mi) long river in the Banat region of Vojvodina, Serbia and Romania and a left tributary of the Danube. The Karaš drains an area of 1,400 square kilometres (540 sq mi) and although it has been channeled it is not navigable.

== Name ==
In Roman times the river was known as Apo, from a Thracian word meaning "water". The Hungarian name is Karas.

== Romania ==
The Caraș originates in the Anina Mountains, northeast of the town of Anina, close to the sources of the Bârzava and Nera rivers. It runs through Romania for 50 kilometres (31 mi), flowing to the north in its early reaches before turning southwest at the town of Carașova where it receives many short tributaries, most notably, the left tributary of the Lișava, then passes many villages (including Giurgiova, Ticvaniu Mare, Grădinari, Vărădia, Mercina, Vrani) before it enters the Serbian province of Vojvodina. In Romania, its length is 79 km (49 mi) and its basin size is 1,280 km^{2} (490 sq mi).

== Serbia ==
Right after crossing the border, the Karaš receives its two major tributaries, the Borugu from the right, and the Vicinic from the left. It passes the villages of Kuštilj, Vojvodinci, Dobričevo, Straža and Jasenovo and reaches the eastern side of the Deliblatska Peščara and Dumača hill, the easternmost side of the Hills of Zagajica. From this point, the Karaš is channeled and incorporated into the last part of the Danube-Tisa Canal. It runs alongside the villages of Dupljaja, Grebenac, Kajtasovo and Banatska Palanka before it ends its 60-kilometre (37 mi) course through Serbia, emptying into the Danube near the village of Stara Palanka, across from the tourist resort of Ram.

== Settlements located near the river ==
In Romania: Carașova, Goruia, Ticvaniu Mare, Grădinari, Vărădia, Vrani

In Serbia: Kuštilj, Vojvodinci, Dobričevo, Straža, Jasenovo, Dupljaja, Grebenac, Kajtasovo, Banatska Palanka, Stara Palanka

== Tributaries ==
The following are tributaries of the Karaš (from source to mouth):

Left: Buhui, Raicovacea, Șereniac, Gârliște, Goruița, Jitin, Lișava, Mercina, Ciclova, Vicinic

Right: Izvoru Mare, Jervanu Mare, Comarnic, Gelug, Dognecea, Barheș, Ciornovăț, Vărădia, Borugu

== Krašovani ==
Krašovani or Karašani (Cyrillic: Крашовани or Карашани; People from the Karaš), are people of South Slavic origin, settled around the town of Carașova in the river's upper course. Known as good farmers and craftsmen with an estimated number of 20,000 after World War II.
