= Dognecea (river) =

- Location within Romania

Location
- Country: Romania
- Counties: Caraș-Severin County
- Villages: Dognecea

Physical characteristics
- Mouth: Caraș
  - location: Secășeni
  - coordinates: 45.1613°N 21.6827°E
- Length: 24 km (15 mi)
- Basin size: 96 km^{2} (37 sq mi)

Basin features
- Progression: Karaš→ Danube→ Black Sea
- Tributaries
  - right: Călina, Stăpâniș

The Dognecea is a right tributary of the river Caraș (Karaš) in Romania. It discharges into the Caraș near Secășeni. Its length is 24 km (15 mi) and its basin size is 96 km^{2} (37 sq mi).
