= Glăvan River =

Glăvan River may refer to:

- Glăvan, a tributary of the Buhui, Romania
- Glăvan, a tributary of the Lozna, Romania
