= Gârliște mine =

Iron ore mine in Caraș-Severin County, Romania

- Location: Goruia, Caraș-Severin County, Romania
- Products: Iron ore
- Opened: 1858

The Gârliște mine is a large open pit mine in the western part of Romania in Goruia, Caraș-Severin County. Gârliște represents one of the largest iron ore reserves in Romania, having estimated reserves of 3.6 million tonnes of ore.
