= Vojvodinci =

Vojvodinci Војводинци (Serbian) Voivodinț (Romanian)
- Village (Selo)
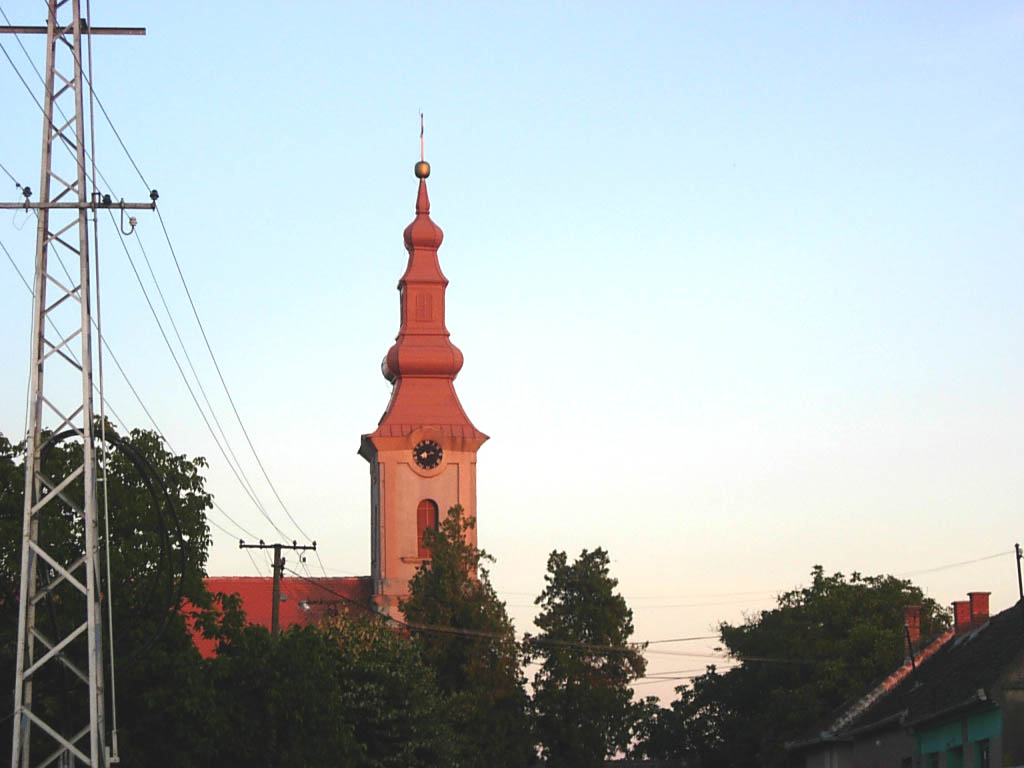
- The Romanian Orthodox Church

- Location of Vojvodinci within Serbia Vojvodinci (Serbia) Vojvodinci (Europe)
- Coordinates: 45°01′04″N 21°20′29″E
- Country: Serbia
- Province: Vojvodina
- District: South Banat
- Municipality: Vršac
- Elevation: 74 m (243 ft)

Population (2022)
  - Total: 254
- Time zone: UTC+1 (CET)
  - Summer (DST): UTC+2 (CEST)
- Postal code: 26338
- Area code: +381(0)13
- Car plates: VŠ

Vojvodinci (Serbian Cyrillic: Војводинци; Romanian: Voivodinț; Hungarian: Vajdalak) is a village located in the administrative area of the City of Vršac, South Banat District, Vojvodina, Serbia. The village has a population of 254 people (2022 census).

== Name ==
In Serbian, the village is known as Vojvodinci (Војводинци), in Romanian as Voivodinț, in Hungarian as Vajdalak, and in German as Wojwodintz.

== Demographics ==
=== Historical population ===
- 1961: 1,012
- 1971: 902
- 1981: 727
- 1991: 593
- 2002: 417
- 2011: 328
- 2022: 254

=== Ethnic groups ===
According to data from the 2022 census, ethnic groups in the village include:

- 213 (83.8%) Romanians
- 18 (7%) Serbs
- Others/Undeclared/Unknown

== See also ==
- List of places in Serbia
- List of cities, towns and villages in Vojvodina
