= Damaschin Bojincă =

Romanian writer and lawyer (1802–1869)

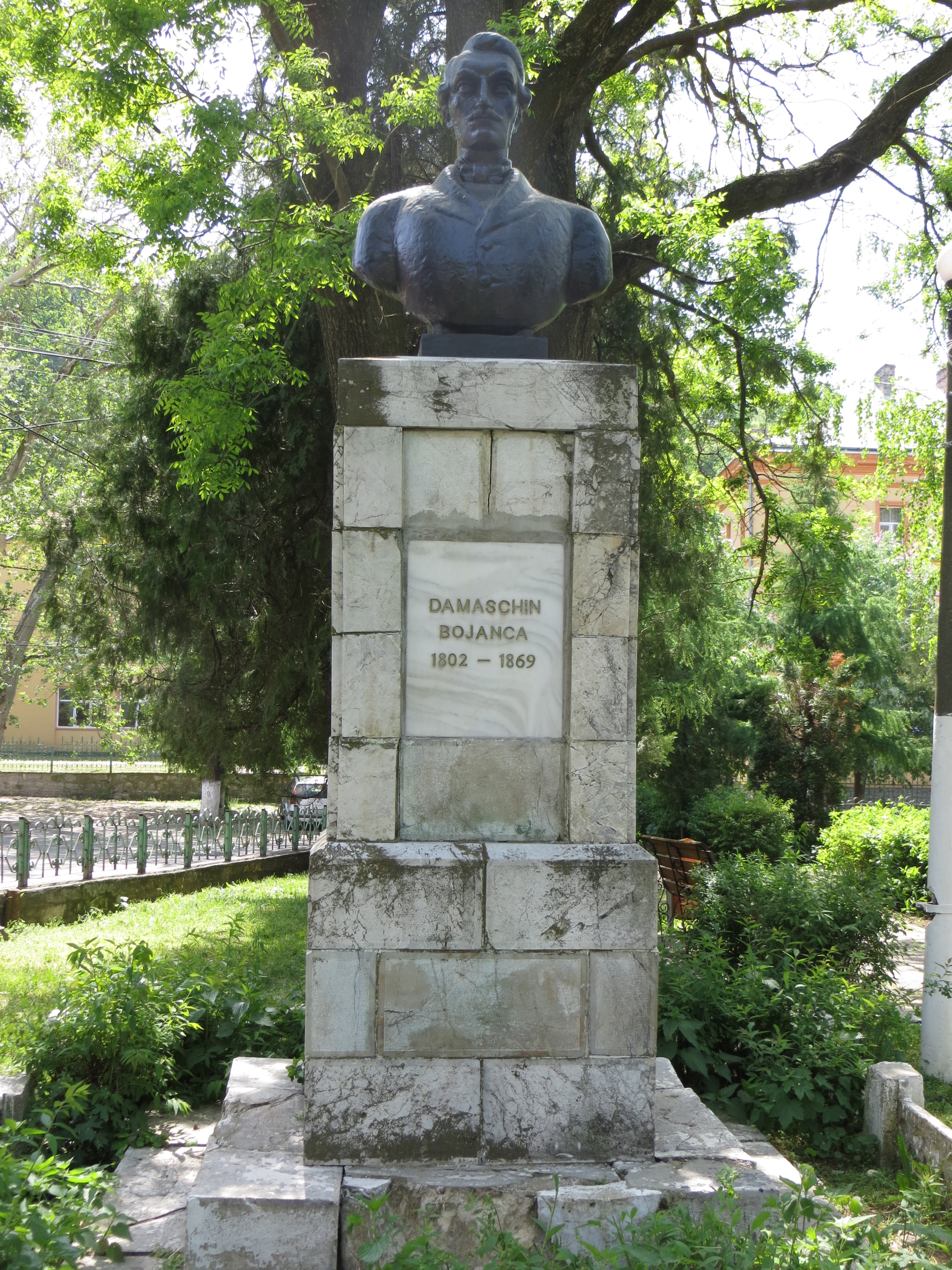
- Damaschin Bojincă bust in Oravița
- Born: October 18, 1802; Gârliște, Habsburg Empire
- Died: August 18, 1869; Dumbrăveni, Suceava county, Principality of Romania
- Occupations: Lawyer; historian; philologist
- Era: Enlightenment
- Movement: Transylvanian School
- Writing career
- Language: Romanian, Latin
- Notable work: "Anticile romanilor" (The antiquities of Romans)

Damaschin Bojincă (1802–1869) was a Romanian writer and lawyer. He is credited, among other things, with the introduction of numerous loanwords in Romanian, of which about 260 remained in the language.

== Early life ==
Born into an ethnic Romanian family in Gârliște, Caraș-Severin County, he attended primary school in Oravița and Vršac (Vârșeț), finishing high school in Timișoara. Entering the Vršac theological seminary, he soon left the institution, preferring to study philosophy and later law in Timișoara, Oradea and Budapest.

== Professional career ==
After receiving his law degree in 1824 and taking up work as a lawyer, he also began a cultural activity, working as an editor at Biblioteca românească in Buda under Zaharia Carcalechi. His preferred subjects were philology and history, in the latter field publishing Istoria românilor (The History of the Romanians), Istorie a lumii pe scurt (Short History of the World), and studies of rulers such as Dimitrie Cantemir, Radu Șerban and Michael the Brave. He also entered in polemics with historian Sava Tököly regarding the origin of Romanians, publishing in Latin Animadversio in Dissertationem Hallensem in 1827, then in Romanian in 1828 Respundere desgurzătoare la cârtirea cea în Halle în anul 1823 făcută which were meant to combat Tököly's arguments in Erweis, daß die Walachen nicht römischer Abkunft sind, und dieß nicht aus ihrer Italienisch-Slavischen Sprache folgt (Proof that the Wallachians are not of Roman descent, and this does not follow from their Italo-Slavic language).

The work to which he devoted the most time, that he considered his most important and that essentially capped his career in historiography was the 1832-1833 Anticile romanilor (Antiquities of the Romans).

Moving to Moldavia in 1833, he remained there for the rest of his life, working as a jurisconsult. In 1834 he published Învățătura legilor împărătești, one of his main contribution to Romanian law. He was also rector of Iași's Socola Monastery seminary and, since 1842, professor of civil law, Roman law and Moldavian law at Academia Mihăileană.

In 1860–1861, during the United Principalities period, he served as Justice Minister at Iași.
