= Ciuchici =

- Commune
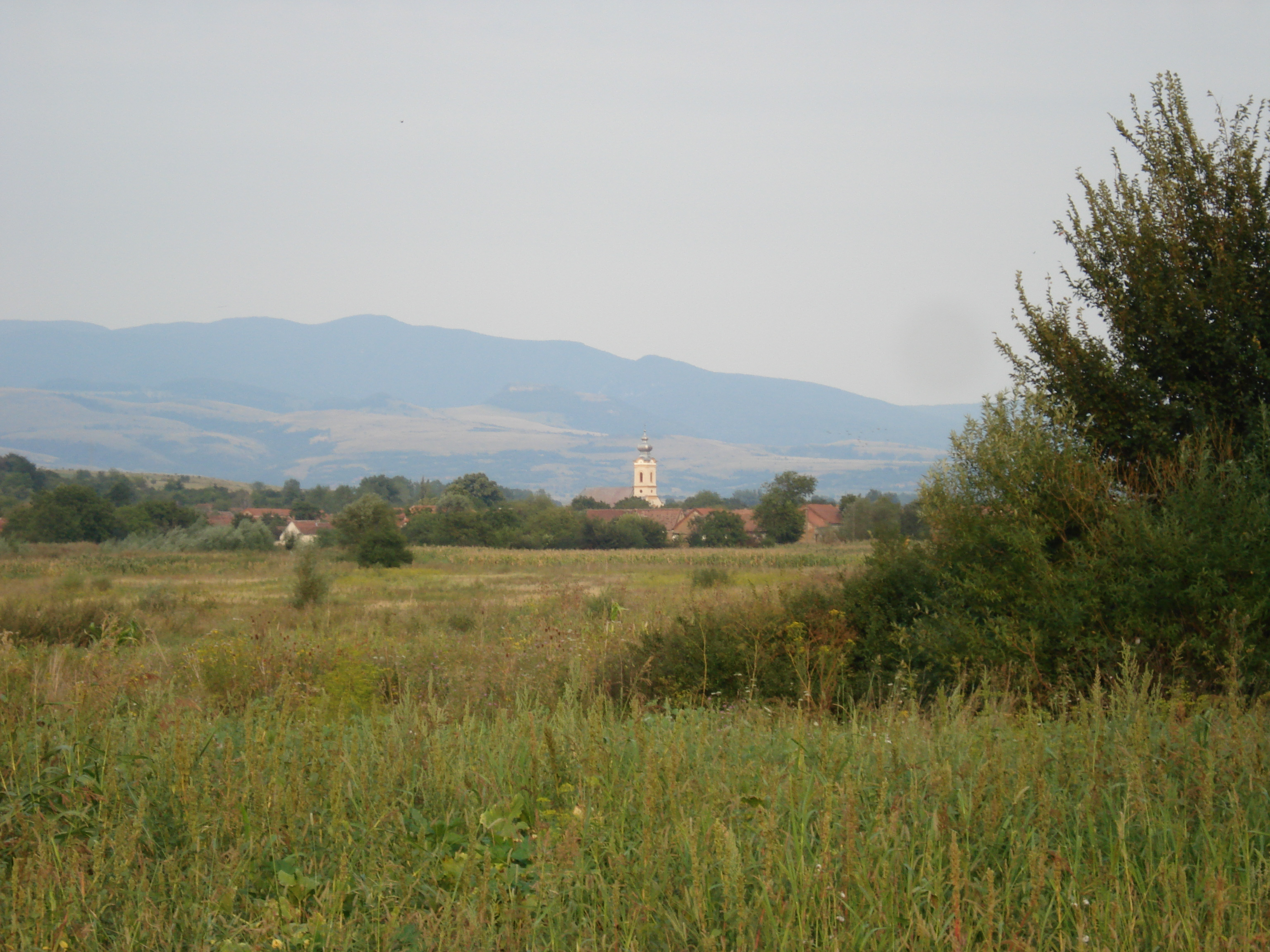

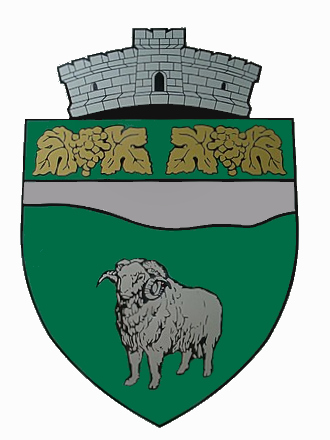
- Coat of arms

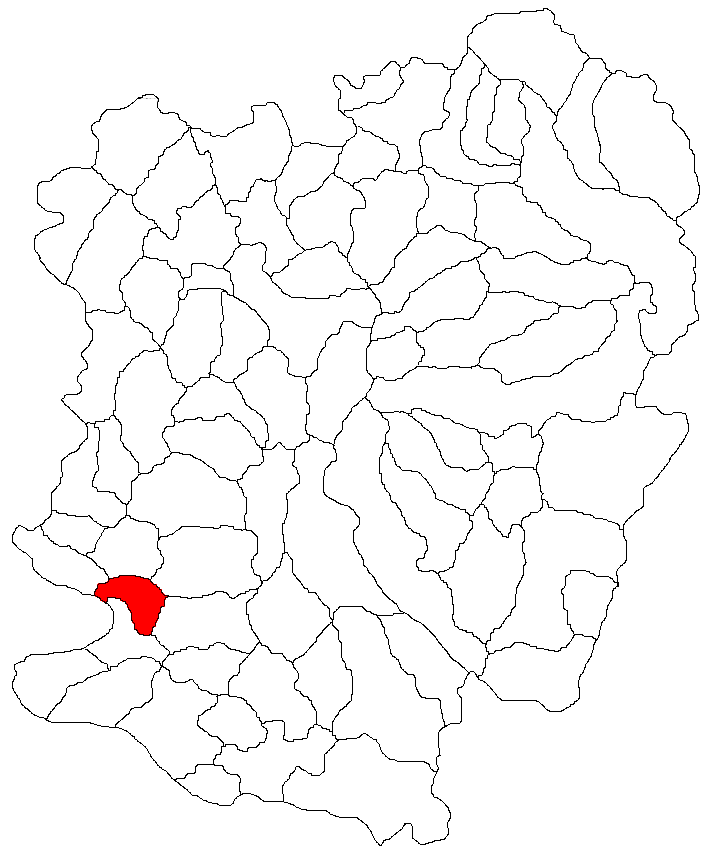
- Location in Caraș-Severin County

- Location in Romania
- Coordinates: 44°56′N 21°37′E
- Country: Romania
- County: Caraș-Severin

Government
  - Mayor (2020–2024): Ion Orbulescu (PSD)
- Area: 55.61 km^{2} (21.47 sq mi)
- Elevation: 129 m (423 ft)
- Population (2021-12-01): 1,019
  - Density: 18.32/km^{2} (47.46/sq mi)
- Time zone: UTC+02:00 (EET)
  - Summer (DST): UTC+03:00 (EEST)
- Postal code: 327080
- Area code: +(40) 255
- Vehicle reg.: CS
- Website: www.uat-ciuchici.ro

Ciuchici (Hungarian: Tyukó) is a commune in Caraș-Severin County, Banat, western Romania with a population of 1,019 people as of 2021. It is composed of four villages: Ciuchici, Macoviște (Mákosfalva), Nicolinț (Miklósháza), and Petrilova (Petrilova).

Historical population
Year	Pop.	±%
1880	4,747	—
1910	4,574	−3.6%
1930	4,258	−6.9%
1977	1,952	−54.2%
2002	1,257	−35.6%
2011	1,338	+6.4%
2021	1,019	−23.8%
Source: Census data
