= Forotic =

- Commune
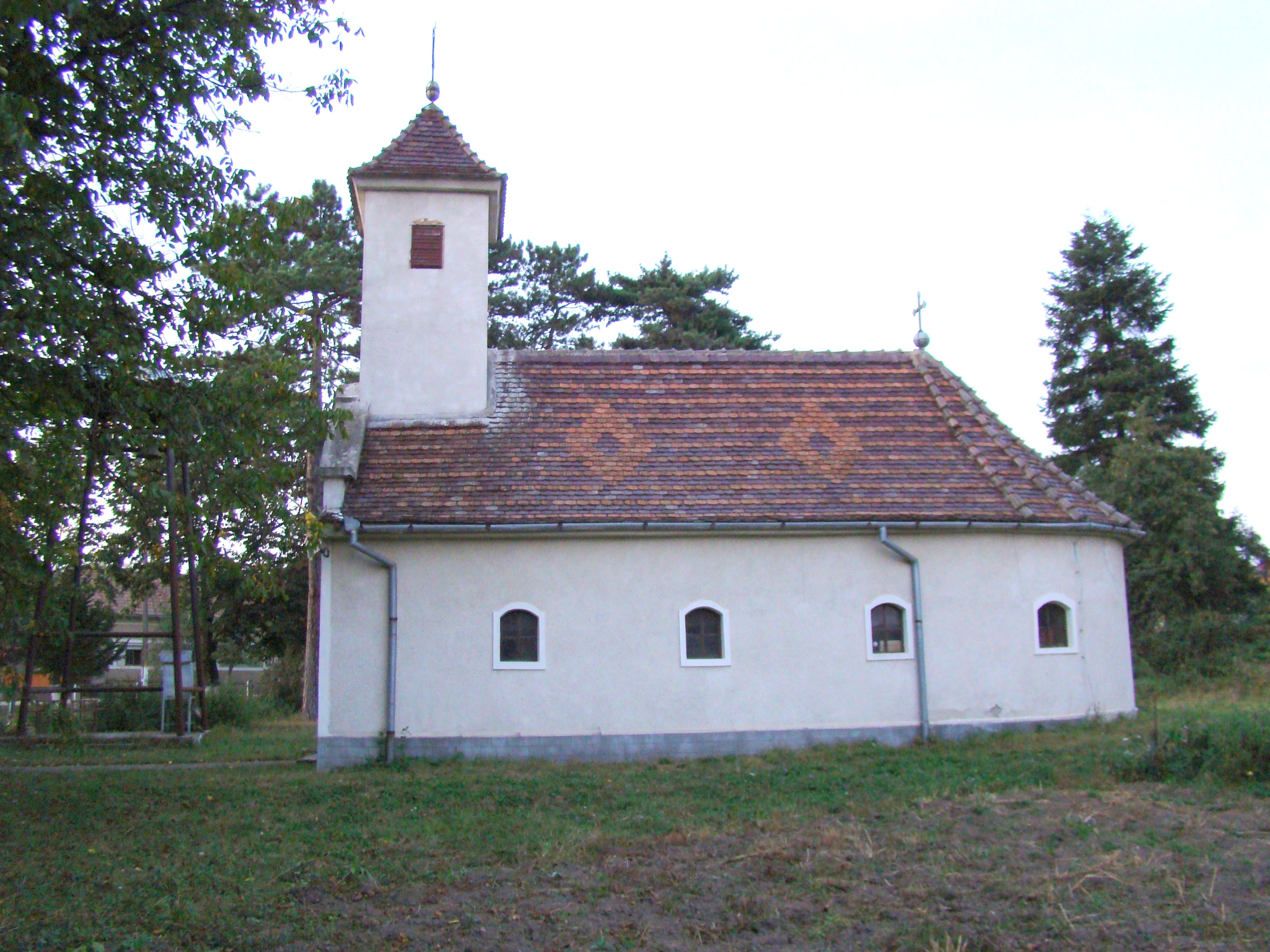
- Wooden church in Surducu Mare

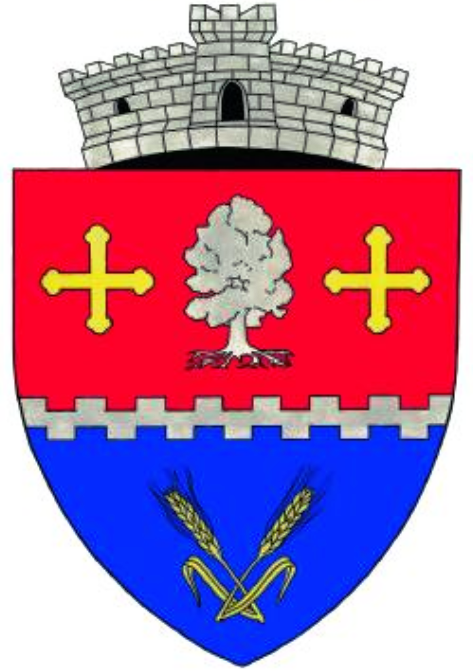
- Coat of arms

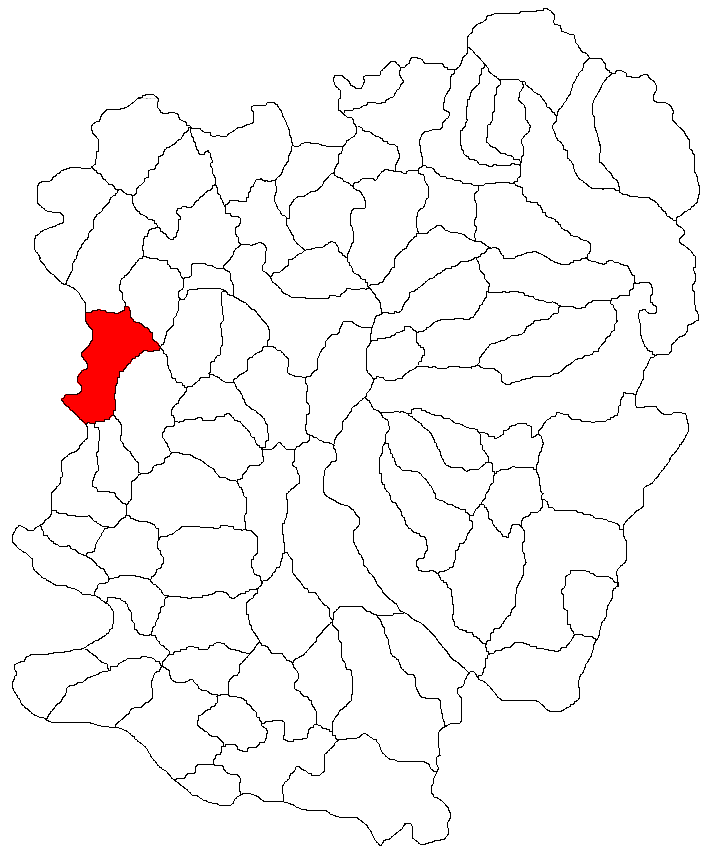
- Location in Caraș-Severin County

- Location in Romania
- Coordinates: 45°14′N 21°35′E
- Country: Romania
- County: Caraș-Severin

Government
  - Mayor (2020–2024): Alexandru Sporea (PNL)
- Area: 108.47 km^{2} (41.88 sq mi)
- Elevation: 139 m (456 ft)
- Population (2021-12-01): 1,488
  - Density: 13.72/km^{2} (35.53/sq mi)
- Time zone: UTC+02:00 (EET)
  - Summer (DST): UTC+03:00 (EEST)
- Postal code: 327210
- Area code: (+40) 02 55
- Vehicle reg.: CS
- Website: comunaforotic.ro

Forotic (Hungarian: Forotik) is a commune in Caraș-Severin County, Banat, Romania with a population of 1,488 people as of 2021. It is composed of four villages: Brezon (Bársonyfalva), Comorâște (Komornok), Forotic, and Surducu Mare (Nagyszurduk).

The commune is located on the western side of Caraș-Severin County, 44 km (27 mi) from the county seat, Reșița. To the southwest is borders Serbia, and to the west it borders Timiș County.

Historical population
Year	Pop.	±%
1880	3,391	—
1910	4,540	+33.9%
1930	3,798	−16.3%
1977	2,580	−32.1%
2002	1,917	−25.7%
2011	1,708	−10.9%
2021	1,448	−15.2%
Source: Census data
