= Ciudanovița =

- Commune
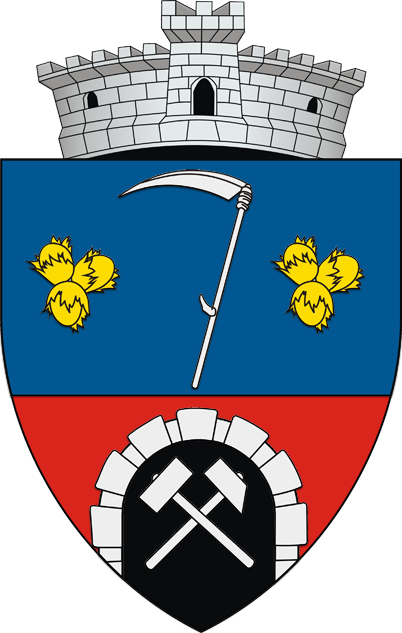
- Coat of arms

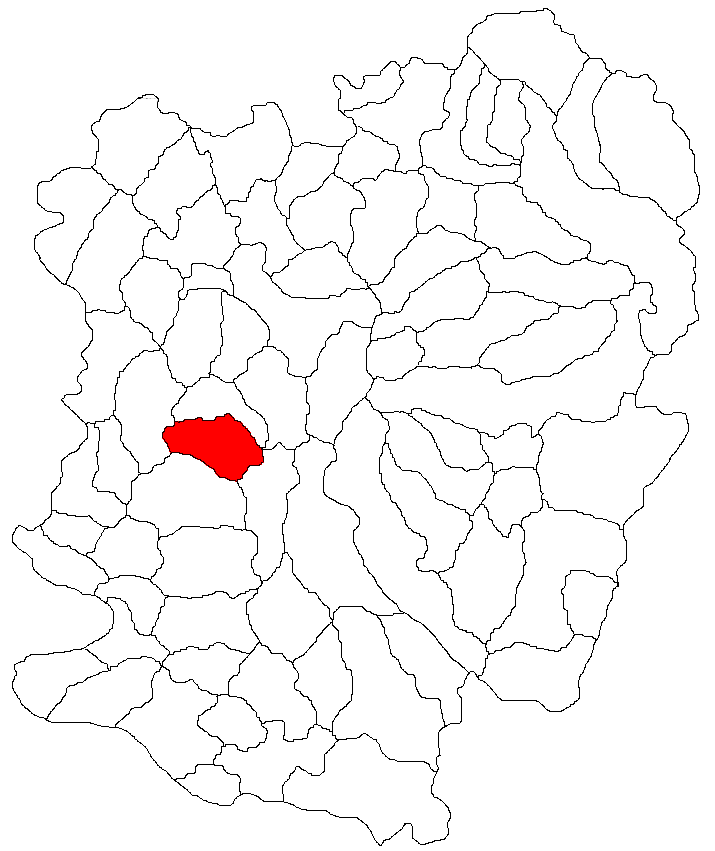
- Location in Caraș-Severin County

- Location in Romania
- Coordinates: 45°09′N 21°47′E
- Country: Romania
- County: Caraș-Severin

Government
  - Mayor (2024–2028): Constantin-Dorian Nebunu (PSD)
- Area: 53.33 km^{2} (20.59 sq mi)
- Elevation: 234 m (768 ft)
- Population (2021-12-01): 444
  - Density: 8.33/km^{2} (21.6/sq mi)
- Time zone: UTC+02:00 (EET)
  - Summer (DST): UTC+03:00 (EEST)
- Postal code: 327085
- Area code: (+40) 02 55
- Vehicle reg.: CS
- Website: primariaciudanovita.ro

Ciudanovița (Hungarian: Csudafalva) is a commune in Caraș-Severin County, western Romania with a population of 444 people. It is composed of two villages, Ciudanovița and Jitin (Dicsény).

== Geography ==
The commune is located in the west-central part of the county, at a distance of 23 km (14 mi) from Oravița and 30 km (19 mi) from the county seat, Reșița.

== Demographics ==
Historical population
| Year | Pop. | ±% |
|---|---|---|
| 1880 | 1,373 | — |
| 1910 | 1,253 | −8.7% |
| 1930 | 981 | −21.7% |
| 1977 | 1,728 | +76.1% |
| 2002 | 777 | −55.0% |
| 2011 | 657 | −15.4% |
| 2021 | 444 | −32.4% |
Source: Census data

At the 2011 census, Ciudanovița had a population of 657; of those, 92.24% were ethnic Romanians and 1.37% were ethnic Romani. At the 2021 census, the population had decreased to 444, of which 92.57% were ethnic Romanians.

== The Ciudanovița uranium mine ==
In the early 1950s, during the Soviet occupation of Romania, Sovromcuarț, a joint Soviet–Romanian enterprise (SovRom), developed a uranium mine at Ciudanovița. After initial prospections, the Soviets began uranium ore mining in 1952, using their own equipment and employing around 10,000 local workers; the ore was loaded into wagons and transported to the Soviet Union. The mining required significant resources, and as a direct result Ciudanovița grew in population, reaching as high as 35,000 people. There was a local hospital, a cinema, restaurants, places with live music and draft beer and many shops. In 1957, the SovRoms were disbanded, and the exploitation was taken over by the Romanian state, which continued operating the mine until 1964, when the country’s war debts were settled.

The mine was closed on October 1, 1997. The blocks of the former workers' colony have deteriorated, and some have been demolished, together with the former buildings of the mines, the hospital, the former railway station, the cultural home, and the former shops and canteens of the colony. The surface readings in the residue area (called Golgota) are quite high, surpassing 1 μSv/h (2.8×10^{−5} rem/ks) in many places; a Geiger counter will sound the alarm when approaching the former mines. At the mine's tailings dumps, the radioactivity is 100 times the alert limit. From inside the galleries and abandoned shafts, radioactive gas emissions containing ^{222}Rn (radon) and ^{220}Rn (thoron) and mine waters loaded with radioactive suspensions come to the surface.

== Natives ==
- Romulus Ladea (1901–1970), sculptor
