= Lupac =

- Commune
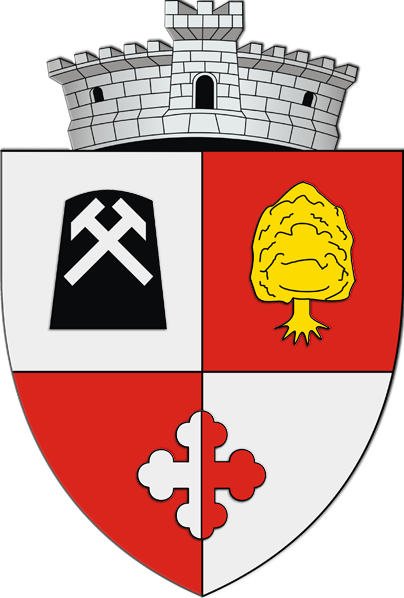
- Coat of arms

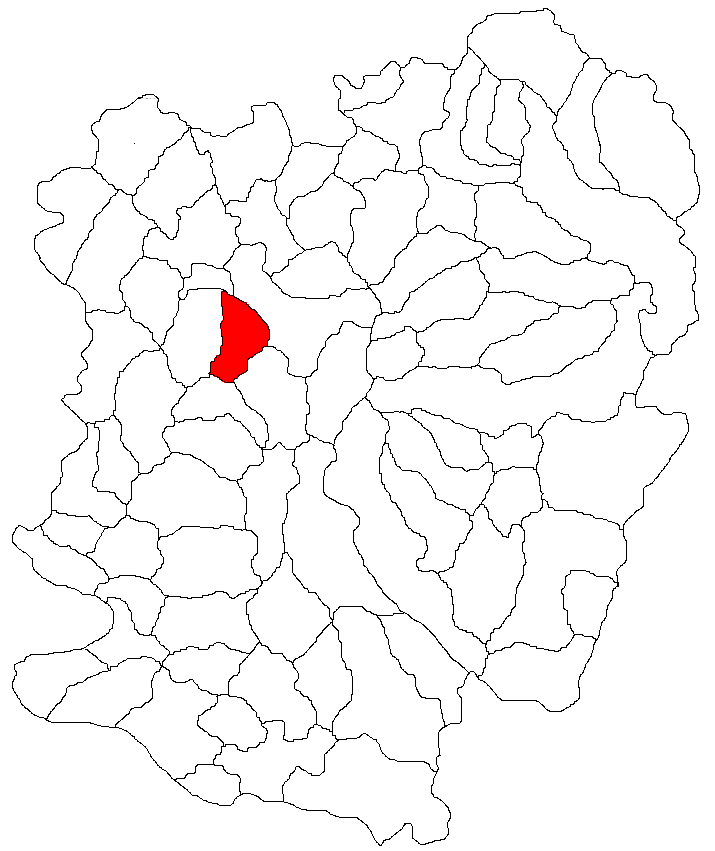
- Location in Caraș-Severin County

- Location in Romania
- Coordinates: 45°17′N 21°49′E
- Country: Romania
- County: Caraș-Severin
- Established: 1598

Government
  - Mayor (2024–2028): Marian Lauș (Marijan Lauš) (PSD)
- Area: 66.49 km^{2} (25.67 sq mi)
- Elevation: 240 m (790 ft)
- Population (2021-12-01): 2,423
  - Density: 36.44/km^{2} (94.38/sq mi)
- Time zone: UTC+02:00 (EET)
  - Summer (DST): UTC+03:00 (EEST)
- Postal code: 327255
- Area code: +(40) 255
- Vehicle reg.: CS
- Website: comunalupac.ro

Lupac (Romanian: Lupac; Croatian: Lupak; Hungarian: Kiskrassó) is a commune in Caraș-Severin County, Banat, Romania. It is composed of four villages: Clocotici (Klokotič; Krassócsörgő), Lupac, Rafnic (Ravnik; Kengyeltó), and Vodnic (Vodnik; Vizes).

== Geography ==
The commune is situated in the foothills of the Banat Mountains, at an altitude of 240 m (790 ft), on the banks of the river Gelug. It located in the central part of the county, 8.6 km (5.3 mi) southwest of the county seat, Reșița.

== Demographics ==
At the 2002 census, the population of Lupac numbered 3,023 people and was mostly made up of Krashovani Croats (93.38%), with a minority of Romanians (5.32%); most of the inhabitants of the commune (95.33%) were Roman Catholic. At the 2011 census, the population had decreased to 2,677; of those, 86.59% were Croats, 7.28% Romanians, and 1.08% Roma. At the 2021 census, the commune had 2,423 inhabitants, of which 86.22% were Croats, 7.92% Romanians, and 1.24% Roma.

== Languages ==
The commune is officially bilingual, with both Romanian and Croatian being used as working languages on public signage and in administration, education and justice (see Croats of Romania).

== Sports ==
AFC Voința Lupac is a football club based in the commune, currently playing in Liga III, the third tier of the Romanian football league system.
