= Dognecea =

- Commune
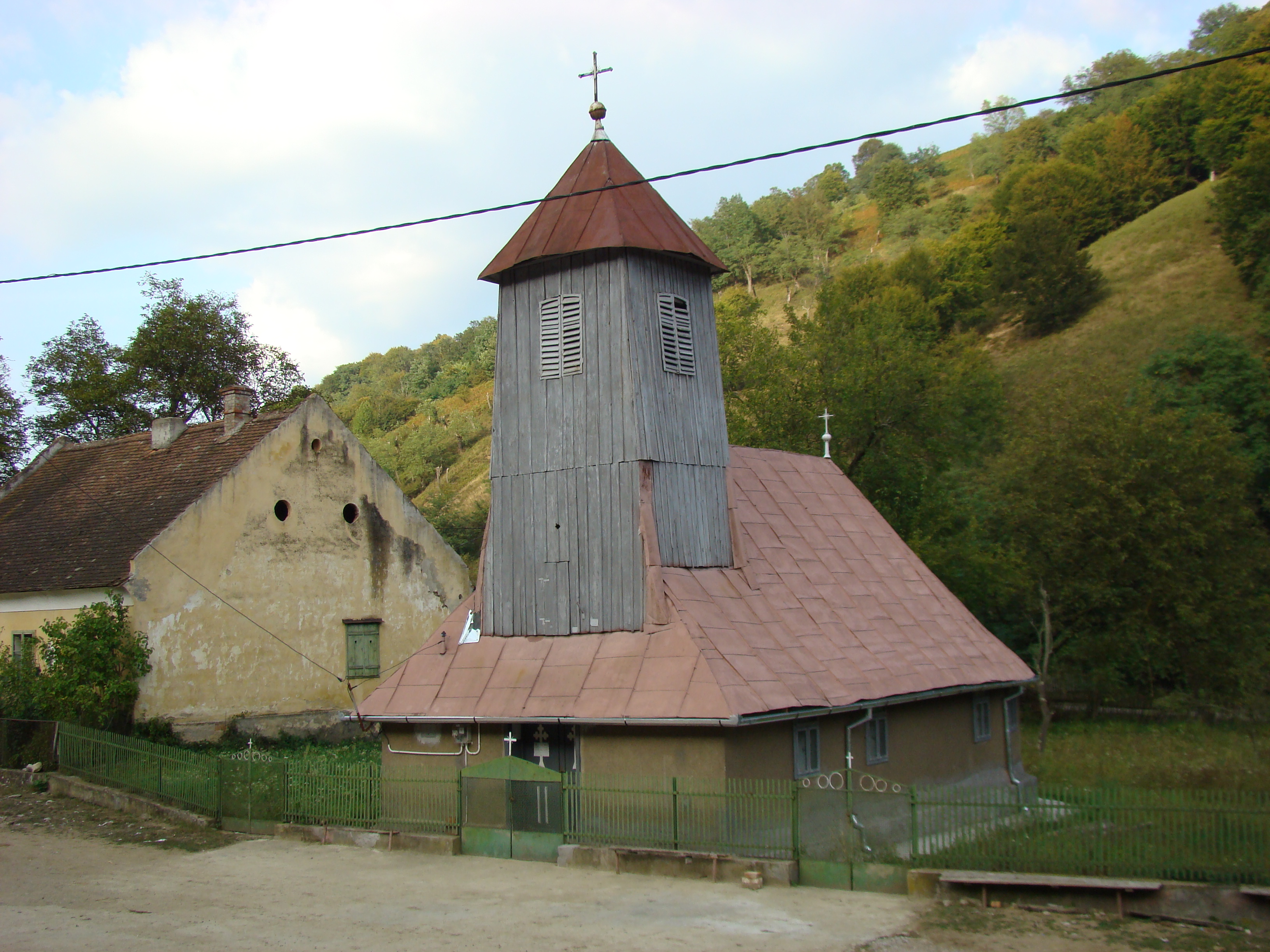
- Wooden church in Calina

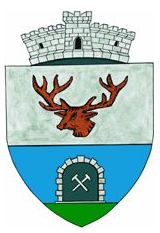
- Coat of arms

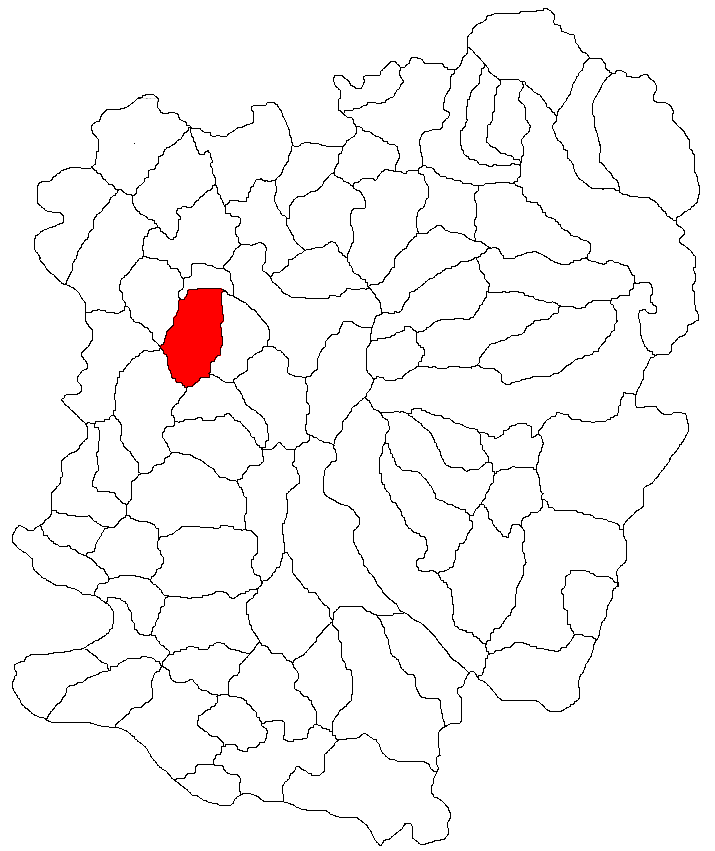
- Location in Caraș-Severin County

- Location in Romania
- Coordinates: 45°16′N 21°45′E
- Country: Romania
- County: Caraș-Severin

Government
  - Mayor (2024–2028): Remus Rof (PSD)
- Area: 75.73 km^{2} (29.24 sq mi)
- Elevation: 287 m (942 ft)
- Population (2021-12-01): 1,768
  - Density: 23.35/km^{2} (60.47/sq mi)
- Time zone: UTC+02:00 (EET)
  - Summer (DST): UTC+03:00 (EEST)
- Postal code: 327181
- Area code: (+40) 02 55
- Vehicle reg.: CS
- Website: comunadognecea.ro

Dognecea (Hungarian: Dognácska) is a commune in Caraș-Severin County, in the Banat region of Romania, with a population of 1,768 people as of 2021. It is composed of two villages, Calina (Kalina) and Dognecea.

The commune is located in the northwestern part of the county, 21 km (13 mi) south of the town of Bocșa, and 22 km (14 mi) west of the county seat, Reșița. It lies on the banks of the Dognecea river, at an altitude of 287 m (942 ft), in the foothills of the Banat Mountains.

Historical population
Year	Pop.	±%
1880	3,990	—
1910	4,035	+1.1%
1930	3,308	−18.0%
1977	2,944	−11.0%
2002	2,044	−30.6%
2011	2,009	−1.7%
2021	1,768	−12.0%
Source: Census data
