= Carașova =

Carașova Karaševo
- Commune
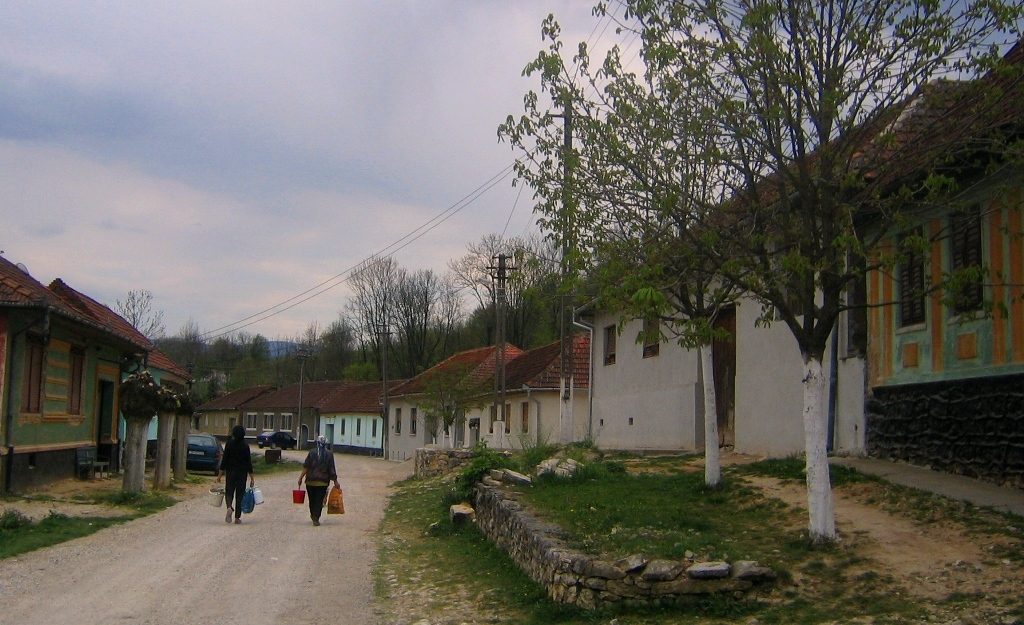
- Iabalcea

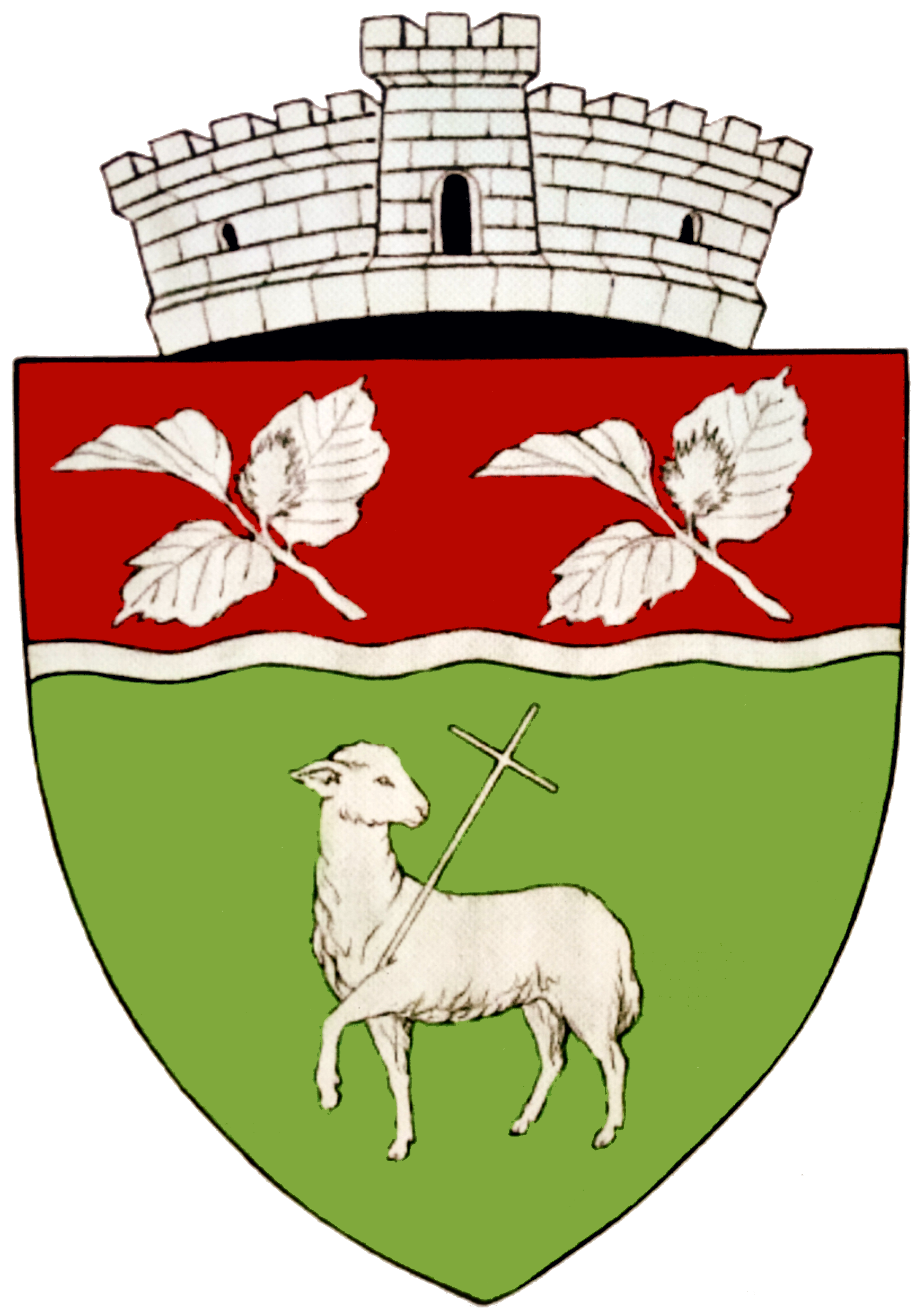
- Coat of arms

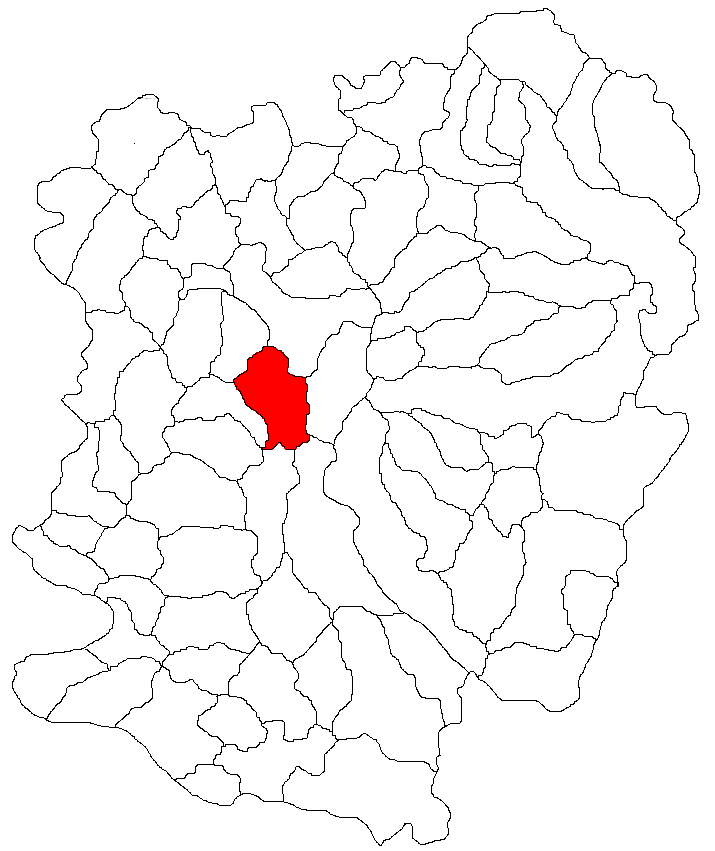
- Location in Caraș-Severin County

- Location in Romania
- Coordinates: 45°12′N 21°52′E
- Country: Romania
- County: Caraș-Severin

Government
  - Mayor (2024–2028): Ivan Hațegan (PSD)
- Area: 143.39 km^{2} (55.36 sq mi)
- Elevation: 205 m (673 ft)
- Population (2021-12-01): 2,529
  - Density: 17.64/km^{2} (45.68/sq mi)
- Time zone: UTC+02:00 (EET)
  - Summer (DST): UTC+03:00 (EEST)
- Postal code: 327065
- Area code: +(40) 02 55
- Vehicle reg.: CS
- Website: primariacarasova.ro

Carașova (Croatian: Karaševo; Hungarian: Krassóvár) is a commune in Caraș-Severin County, Romania. It is known especially for its geographical placement and for the origin of its Croatian inhabitants, the Krashovani. The population of the commune numbered 2,529 people at the 2021 census.

== Geography ==
Carașova is located in the central part of Caraș-Severin County, in the historical region of Banat, at a distance of 15 km (9.3 mi) from Reșița. It is found in a mountainous area on the upper course of the river Caraș, near the entrance to the Semenic-Caraș Gorge National Park.

=== Villages ===
The commune is composed of three villages:

- Carașova, pop. 2,341 in 2011
- Iabalcea (Croatian: Jabalče; Hungarian: Krassóalmás), pop. 234 in 2011
- Nermed (Croatian: Nermiđ, also Neremić; Hungarian: Nermed), pop. 535 in 2011

== Demographics ==
Historical population
Year	Pop.	±%
1880	4,653	—
1910	4,264	−8.4%
1930	3,921	−8.0%
1977	3,829	−2.3%
2002	3,260	−14.9%
2011	3,110	−4.6%
2021	2,529	−18.7%
Source: Census data

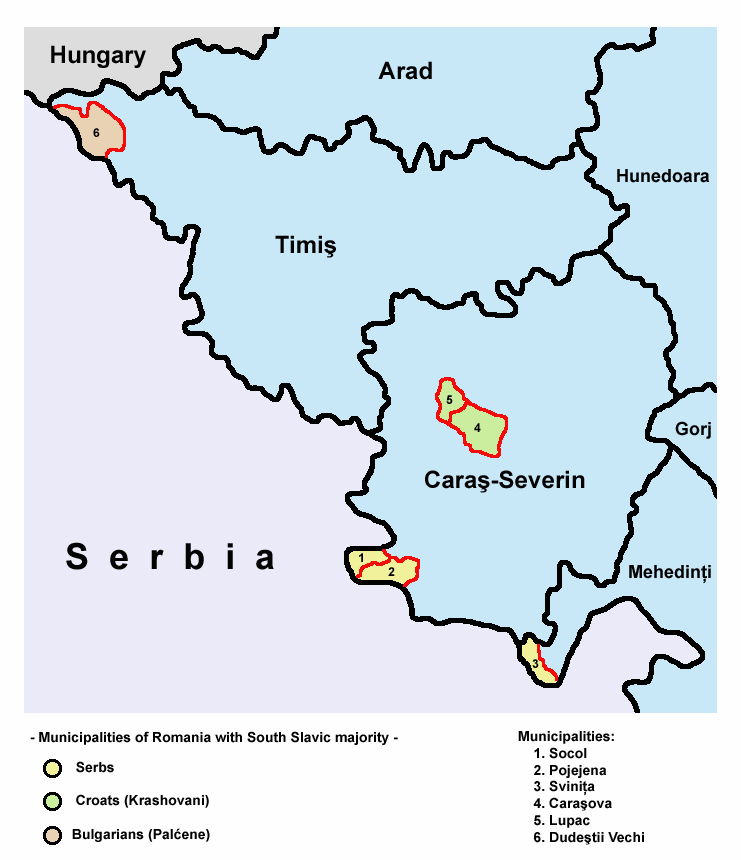
Location of Carașova commune

According to the 2011 census in Romania, Carașova had 3,110 inhabitants; of those, 76.5% were Croats, 7.9% Romanians, 5.5% Roma, and 6.6% others. 72.1% spoke Croatian as first language. The commune is officially bilingual, with both Romanian and Croatian being used as working languages on public signage and in administration, education and justice. Most of the inhabitants of the commune (89.3%) were Roman Catholics, and 8.5% Orthodox.

At the 2021 census, the commune had a population of 2,529; of those, 86.48% were Croats, 6.29% Romanians, 2.06% Roma, and 4.43% others.

== History ==
The first time attested in 1323 under the name of Kraso. Other similar names were later used, depending on which administration used them (Karasow - 1333, Nog Carassou and Kyskarassou - 1358, led by the knyaz Bozorad, Krassowcz - 1535, Crassowcz - 1550, Crasso - 1597, Karasevo - 1690–1700, Karasova - 1717, and after until 1899 Krassova when it was changed to Krassóvár).

Due to the citadel built nearby, Carașova was in the past an important administrative, political and religious centre. In 1333, Carașova was the headquarters of a Roman Catholic diocese which appears to have existed since 1285, but ceased to exist after the events of 1537, and was restored only in 1860, to be disbanded again in 1913.

In various documents of early 18th century, such as the census of 1690-–1700 and the conscription of 1717, Carașova was mentioned as having 400 houses, being one of the largest settlements in the area between the Tisa, Mureș, and the Danube, being surpassed only by Timișoara and Caransebeș.

In the mid-18th century, according to the administrative organization prior to the Military Frontier of 1768, Carașova was part of the Vršac county and it was the capital of the administrative circle with the same name which included 32 towns, including Reșița, Dognecea, Bocșa, and here were located an administrative office, an Eastern Orthodox church, and Roman Catholic church.

== Krashovani ==
Most of the people of Carașova are Krashovani, which are named by the Banat Romanians cârșoveni, carașoveni, cotcoreți, and cocoși, while the Croats call themselves Krašovani, Karašovani, Karaševci.

Until 1989, most of the people called themselves carașoveni and their language carașoveană and considered themselves a people distinct to the other Slavic peoples around the area, such as Serbian, Croatian, or Bulgarian. After 1989, the vast majority started identifying themselves as Croats.

== Politics and administration ==
The administration of Carașova consists of a mayor and a local council composed of 11 councilors. The mayor, Ivan Hațegan, from the Social Democratic Party, has been in office since 2024.
