= Dobričevo =

Dobričevo Добричево Udvarszállás
- Village (Selo)
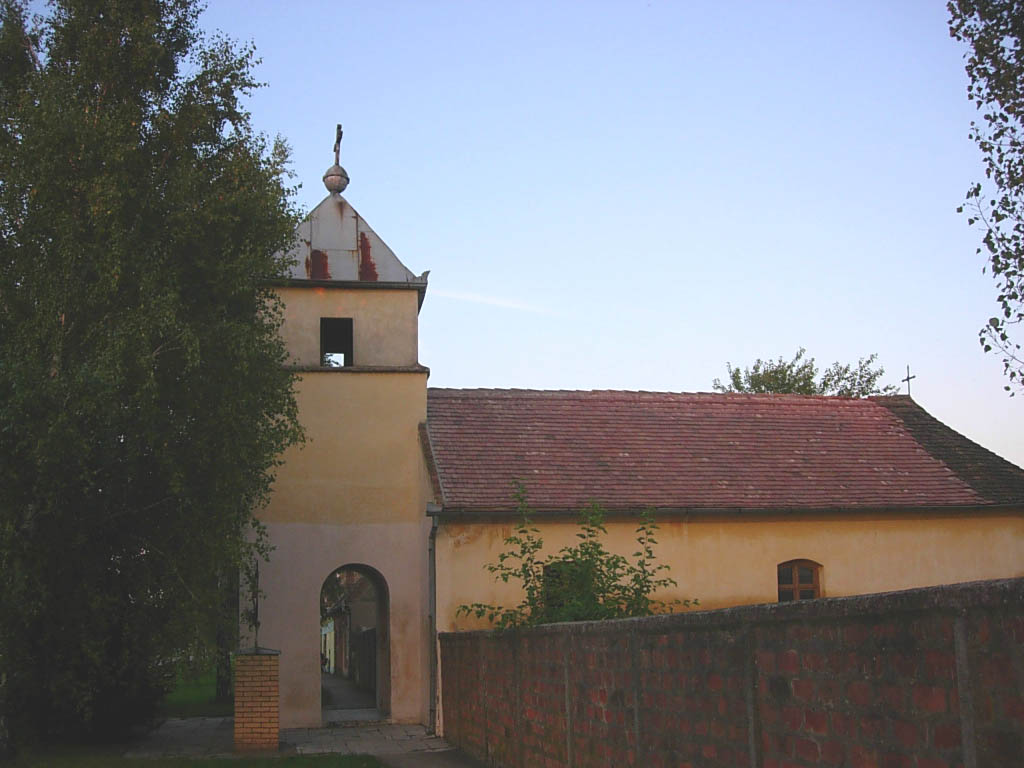
- The old Birth of Blessed Virgin Mary Catholic Church.

- Location of Dobričevo within Serbia Dobričevo (Serbia) Dobričevo (Europe)
- Coordinates: 44°59′13″N 21°21′08″E
- Country: Serbia
- Province: Vojvodina
- District: South Banat
- Municipality: Bela Crkva
- Elevation: 81 m (266 ft)

Population (2002)
  - Dobričevo: 226
- Time zone: UTC+1 (CET)
  - Summer (DST): UTC+2 (CEST)
- Area code: +381(0)13
- Car plates: VŠ

Dobričevo (Serbian Cyrillic: Добричево, Hungarian: Udvarszállás) is a village in Serbia. It is situated in the Bela Crkva municipality, in the South Banat District, Vojvodina province. The village has a Hungarian ethnic majority (88.49%) and a population of 226 (2002 census).

== History ==
The village was founded in 1825 under name Ud-varsallas and was settled by 265 Catholic colonists. The village church was founded in 1861, and railway station in 1891. Before 1918, the village was part of the Krassó-Szörény county of former Austria-Hungary. After 1918, it was part of the Banat county of the Kingdom of Serbs, Croats and Slovenes, after 1922 part of Podunavlje oblast and after 1929 part of Danube Banovina. From 1941 to 1944 it was occupied by German troops and was included into German-administered autonomous region of Banat within the area governed by the Military Administration in Serbia, and since 1945, it is part of the autonomous province of Vojvodina within Serbia and Yugoslavia.

== Historical population ==
- 1961: 408
- 1971: 334
- 1981: 306
- 1991: 265
- 2002: 226

== See also ==
- List of places in Serbia
- List of cities, towns and villages in Vojvodina
