= Goruia =

- Commune
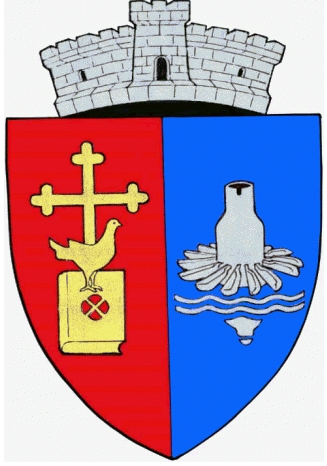
- Coat of arms

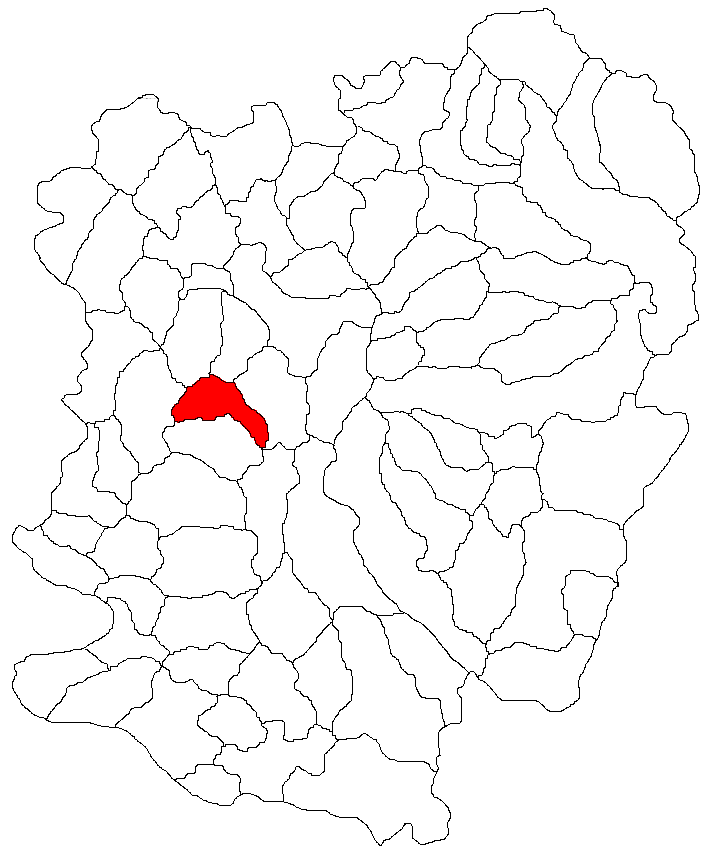
- Location in Caraș-Severin County

- Location in Romania
- Coordinates: 45°11′N 21°47′E
- Country: Romania
- County: Caraș-Severin

Government
  - Mayor (2020–2024): Ion-Răzvan Văcărescu-Filip (PMP)
- Area: 62.49 km^{2} (24.13 sq mi)
- Elevation: 161 m (528 ft)
- Population (2021-12-01): 660
  - Density: 11/km^{2} (27/sq mi)
- Time zone: EET/EEST (UTC+2/+3)
- Postal code: 327225
- Area code: (+40) 02 55
- Vehicle reg.: CS

Goruia (Hungarian: Gorony) is a commune in Caraș-Severin County, western Romania with a population of 660 people as of 2021. It is composed of three villages: Gârliște (Gerlistye), Giurgiova (Karasszentgyörgy), and Goruia.

The commune is located in the central-west part of the county, on the banks of the Caraș River. It is the site of the Gârliște mine.

Historical population
Year	Pop.	±%
1880	3,744	—
1910	3,179	−15.1%
1930	2,656	−16.5%
1977	1,472	−44.6%
2002	951	−35.4%
2011	790	−16.9%
2021	660	−16.5%
Source: Census data

== Natives ==
- Damaschin Bojincă (1802–1869), writer and jurist
