= Berliște =

- Commune
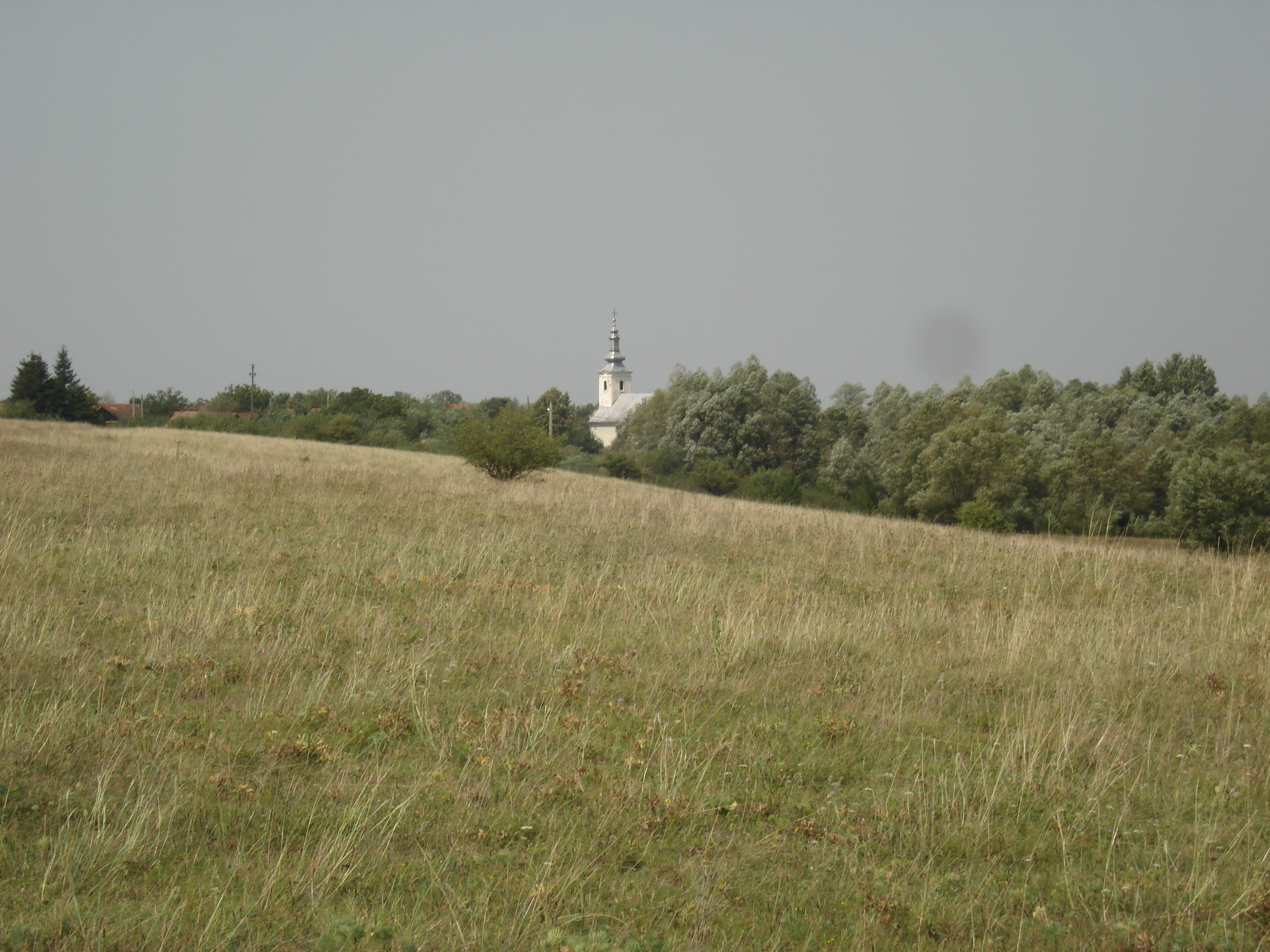
- Rusova Veche village

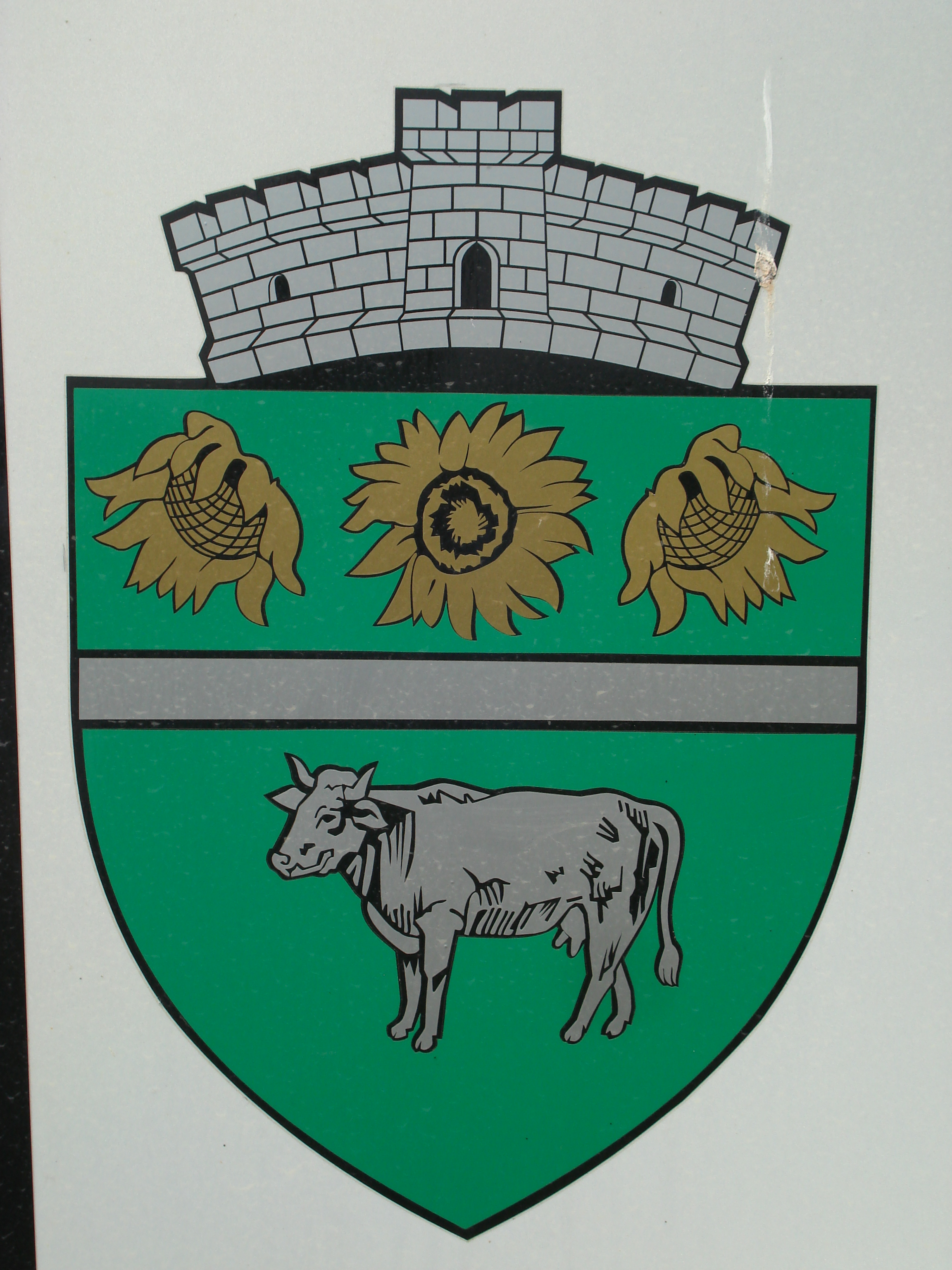
- Coat of arms

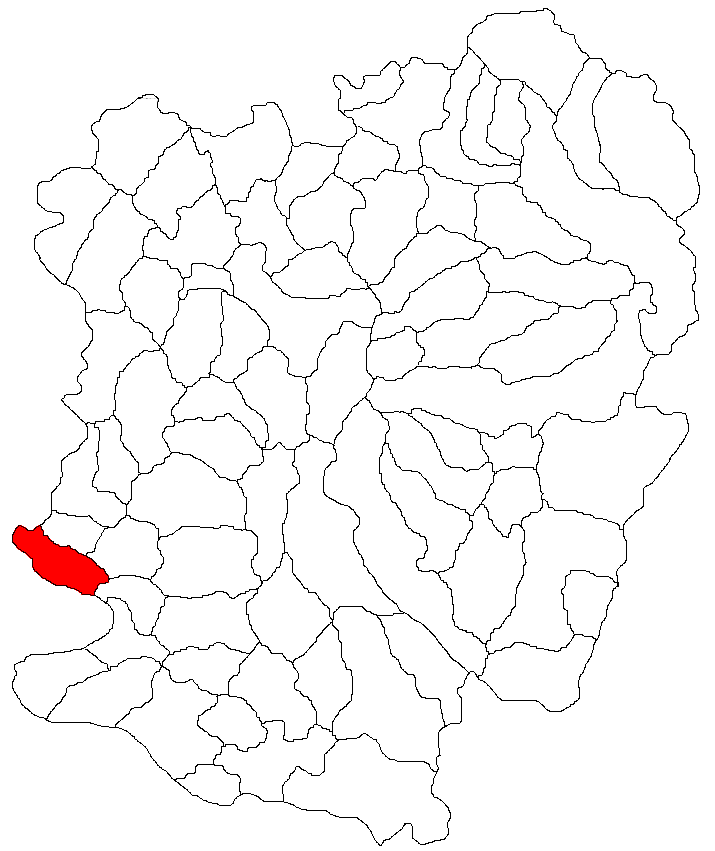
- Location in Caraș-Severin County

- Location in Romania
- Coordinates: 44°59′N 21°28′E
- Country: Romania
- County: Caraș-Severin

Government
  - Mayor (2024–2028): Nicolae Vasile Orăvicean (PSD)
- Area: 61.08 km^{2} (23.58 sq mi)
- Elevation: 102 m (335 ft)
- Population (2021-12-01): 1,003
  - Density: 16.42/km^{2} (42.53/sq mi)
- Time zone: UTC+02:00 (EET)
  - Summer (DST): UTC+03:00 (EEST)
- Postal code: 327020
- Area code: +(40) 02 55
- Vehicle reg.: CS
- Website: www.primariaberliste.ro

Berliște (Hungarian: Berlistye) is a commune in Caraș-Severin County, western Romania with a population of 1,003 as of 2021. It is composed of five villages: Berliște, Iam (Jám), Milcoveni (Mirkóc), Rusova Nouă (Újruszolc), and Rusova Veche (Óruszolc).

Historical population
Year	Pop.	±%
1880	4,256	—
1910	4,224	−0.8%
1930	3,681	−12.9%
1977	2,091	−43.2%
2002	1,358	−35.1%
2011	1,164	−14.3%
2021	1,003	−13.8%
Source: Census data
