= Semenic-Caraș Gorge National Park =

National park in Romania

- Parcul Național Semenic-Cheile Carașului
- IUCN category II (national park)
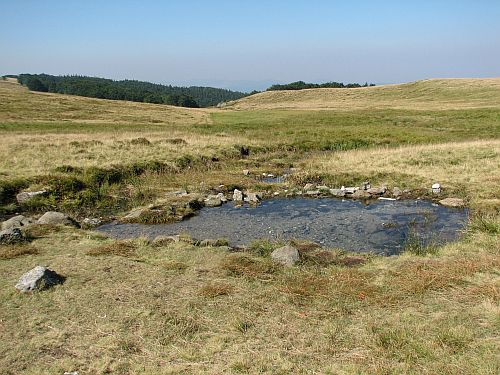
- Semenic Mountains

- Location within Romania
- Location: Caraș-Severin County; Romania
- Nearest city: Anina
- Coordinates: 45°08′31″N 21°58′37″E
- Area: 35,664.80 hectares (88,129.6 acres)
- Established: 2000
- Website: www.pnscc.ro%20www.pnscc.ro

The Semenic-Caraș Gorge National Park (Romanian: Parcul Național Semenic-Cheile Carașului) is a protected area (national park category II IUCN) situated in southwest Romania, in Caraș-Severin County.

== Location ==
The Natural Park is located in the Anina Mountains and the Semenic Mountains, a group of mountains included in the Banat Mountains. It is situated in the southwestern part of Romania, in the middle of Caraș-Severin County.

== Description ==
The Semenic-Caraș Gorge National Park was declared a protected area by Law No. 5 of 6 March 2000 (published in Monitorul Oficial No. 152 on 12 April 2000). It features a typical karst and forest landscape and is characterised by its 300-year-old virgin beech forest, the only one in Europe.

The Park contains a number of nature reserves, including the Caraș Gorge (Cheile Carașului), the Caraș Springs (Izvoarele Carașului), and dripstone and other caves.

The Caraș Gorge is one of Romania’s longest, wildest and most beautiful, with rich flora and fauna, including the Semenic flower (Anntenaria dioica). It has many caves, some only accessible from underwater, with near-vertical limestone walls and so-called “kettles” on the upper Caraș. On the right bank of the Caraș, above the Caraș Gorge, are the ruins of the thirteenth-century Grat Castle. One of the most beautiful caves in this area, with diverse formations of stalactites and stalagmites, is the dripstone cave of Comarnic.

Twenty archaeological sites have been discovered in the Park.

== Wind Power ==
In 1982 construction of four experimental wind turbines by Hidrotim started at Semenic at 45.184271 N 22.071252 E [https:/ /www.facebook.com/ramblersfootprints/posts/four-historic-wind-turbines-on-semenic-hill-started-in-1982-and-an-unique-experi/724097444347242/]. They had a nacelle height of 35 metres a rotor diametre of 30 metres and a generation power of 300 kW . The wind turbines were abandoned in 1995 and were demolished after long time of looting.

== Access ==
- European route E70-București – Craiova – Drobeta-Turnu Severin – Orșova – Topleț – National road DN6 – Mehadia
