= Krashovani =

Total population
- 5,000

Regions with significant populations
- Romania (Caraș-Severin County)

Languages
- Torlakian and Romanian

Religion
- Predominantly Catholic

Related ethnic groups
- Croats of Romania, Serbs of Romania

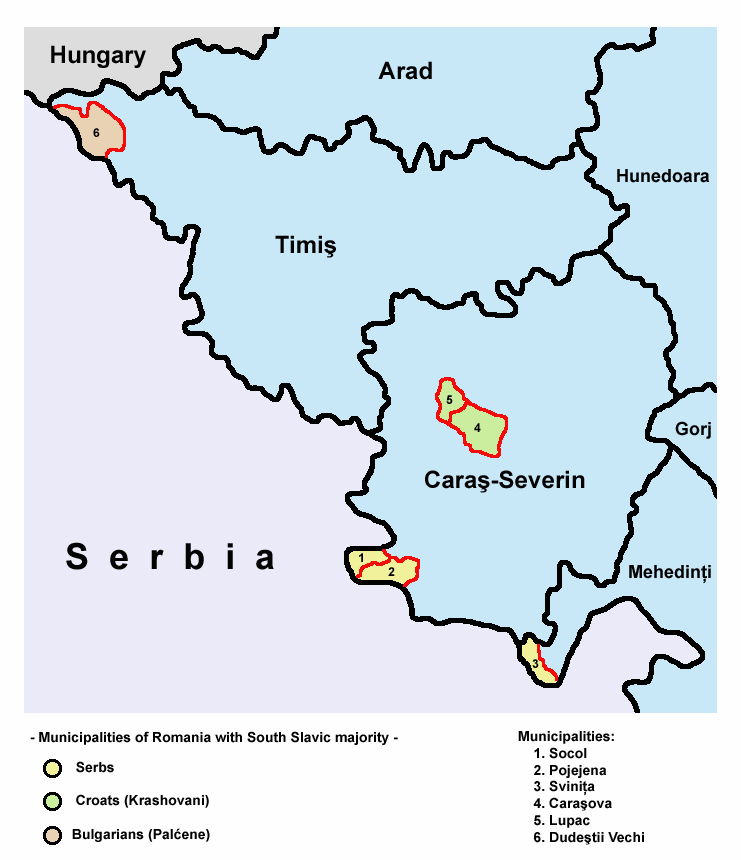
Krashovani-inhabited areas within the Caraș-Severin County (light green).

The Krashovani (Romanian: Carașoveni, Croatian: Krašovani) are a Croat community inhabiting Carașova and Lupac in the Caraș-Severin County within Romanian Banat. They are Catholic by faith and speak a Torlakian dialect.

== Names ==
In Romanian, they are commonly known as Carașoveni; other variants include Carșoveni, Cârșoveni, Cotcoreți or Cocoși. In Croatian, they are commonly known as Krašovani; other variants include Karašovani, Krašovanje, Karaševci and Koroševci.

== Settlements ==
Krashovani, declared as Croats, form a majority in two communes of Caraș-Severin County: Carașova and Lupac.

- Carașova commune
  - Carașova (Karaševo)
  - Nermed (Neremić)
  - Iabalcea (Jabalče)
- Lupac commune
  - Clocotici (Klokotič)
  - Rafnic (Ravnik)
  - Vodnic (Vodnik)
  - Lupac (Lupak)

== Identity ==
The Krashovani adhere to the Catholic Church and identify their language as Croatian. Their dialect is regarded a sub-dialect of the Torlak dialect, a transitional dialect spoken in southeastern Serbia, westernmost Bulgaria and northeastern Macedonia.

According to the 2002 census in Romania, the population of the Carașova commune comprised 84.60% Croats, 4.96% others, 4.47% Roma, 4.41% Romanians and others. 93.12% of the population in that commune declared their mother tongue as Croatian. Only 207 persons declared Krashovani ethnicity in the 2002 census.

== History ==
Their ancestors first settled Carașova in the 13th and 14th centuries from northwestern Bosnia. They formed a community in the northern plateau of the Caraș river, in seven villages, the oldest, Carașova, being mentioned in the 13th and 14th centuries while the rest are first mentioned in the 17th century.

Serbian ethnographer Jovan Cvijić concluded that the community was "very old settlers with origin in Crna Reka who were Catholicised"; Stanko Žuljić claims that their origin is in Turopolje, in Croatia.

The Carașoveni were considered Bulgarians by some Bulgarian scientists in the first half of the 20th century (such as G. Cibrus, M. Mladenov, K. Telbizov, and T. Balkanski), partially based on their view that Torlakian-speakers are ethnically Bulgarians.

According to the Austrian population census there were over 10,000 Carașoveni in Banat. In the 1847 census over 10,000 people declared as Carașoveni. In 1896 the Austro-Hungarian census around 7,500 Carașoveni were listed. The same was stated by the authorities of the Kingdom of Romania in 1940. Their number dropped to 2,775 in 1992.

The Union of Croats of Romania (Croatian: Zajedništvo Hrvata u Rumunjskoj, ZHR; Romanian: Uniunea Croaților din România, UCR) is an ethnic minority political party in Romania representing the Croatian community.

== See also ==
- Torlakian dialect
- Minorities of Romania
- Serbs in Romania
- Banat Bulgarians
- Lupac
