= Grădinari, Caraș-Severin =

Grădinari
- Commune
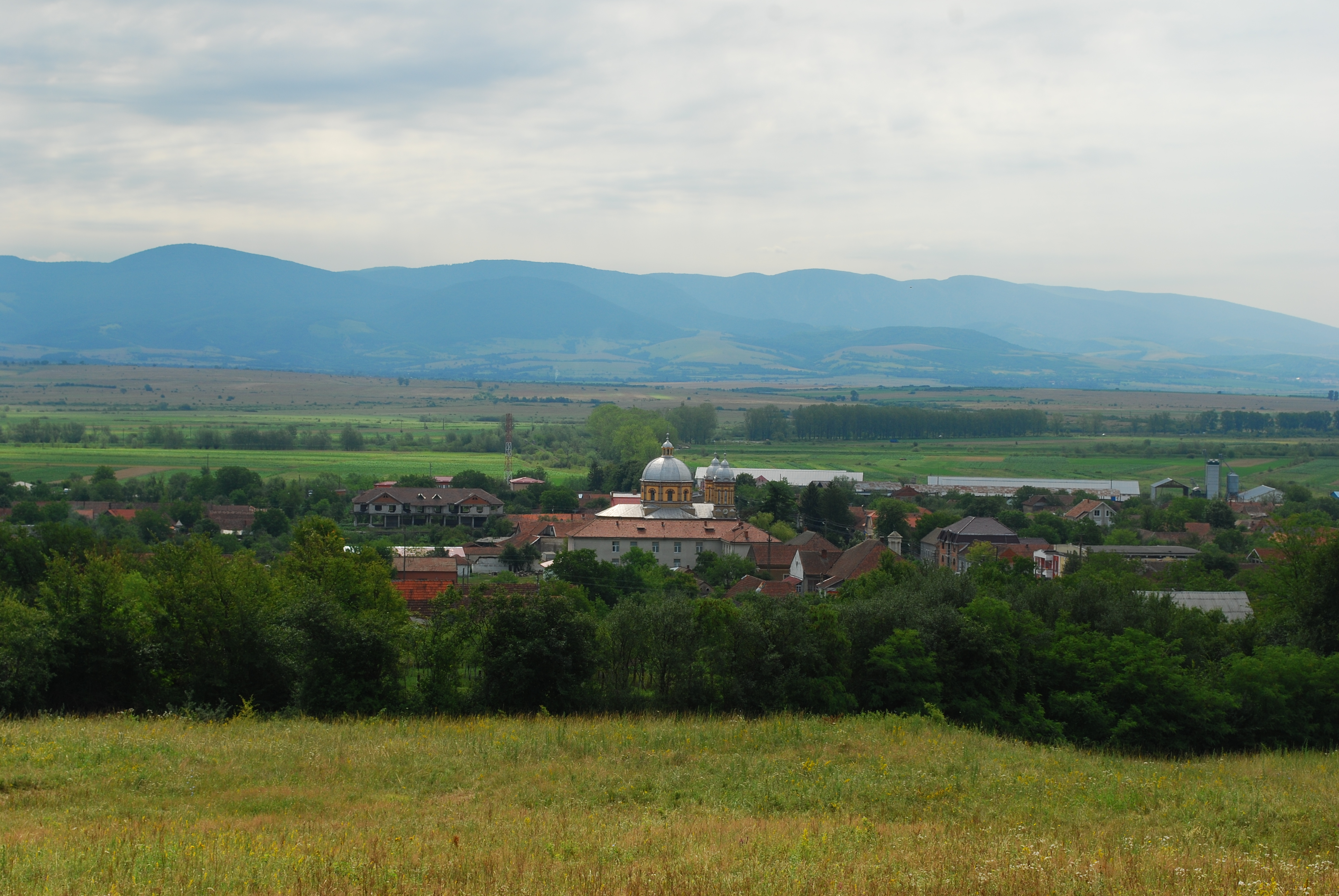

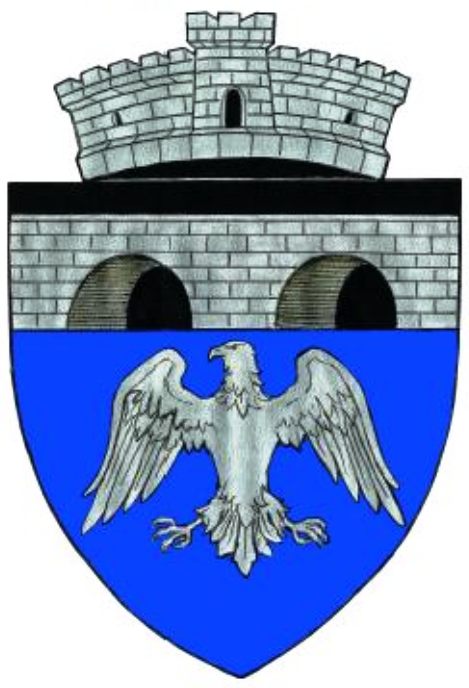
- Coat of arms

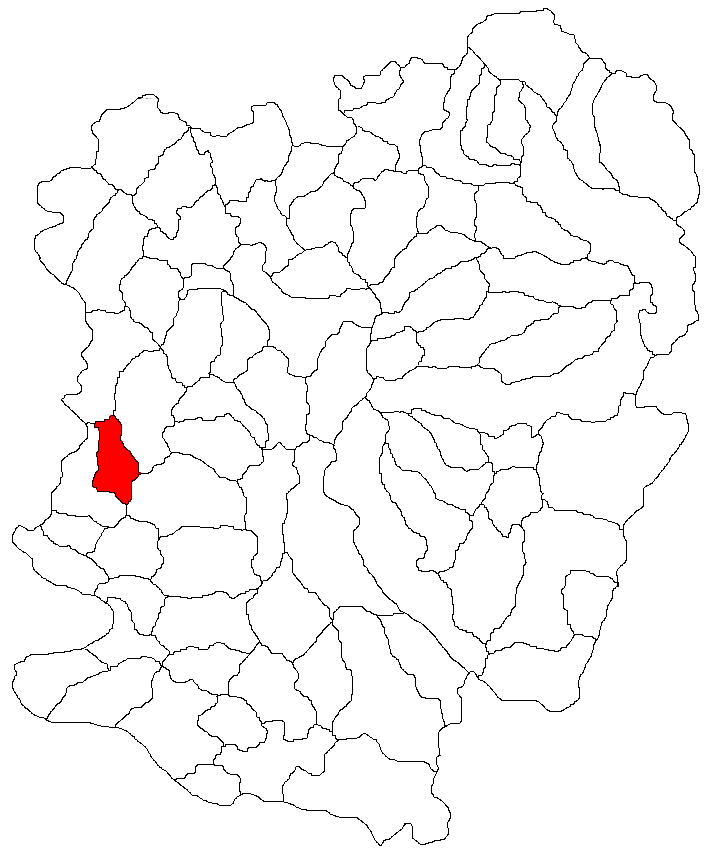
- Location in Caraș-Severin County

- Location in Romania
- Coordinates: 45°7′7″N 21°35′56″E
- Country: Romania
- County: Caraș-Severin

Government
  - Mayor (2024–2028): Ioan Goje (PSD)
- Area: 38.23 km^{2} (14.76 sq mi)
- Elevation: 112 m (367 ft)
- Population (2021-12-01): 1,764
  - Density: 46.14/km^{2} (119.5/sq mi)
- Time zone: UTC+02:00 (EET)
  - Summer (DST): UTC+03:00 (EEST)
- Postal code: 327230
- Area code: (+40) 02 55
- Vehicle reg.: CS
- Website: gradinari-cs.ro

Grădinari (until 1964 Cacova; German: Kakowa, Hungarian: Kákófalva) is a commune in Caraș-Severin County, western Romania with a population of 1,764 people as of 2021. It is composed of two villages, Grădinari and Greoni (Gerőc).

Grădinari is a Slavic-origin word meaning "gardeners" in Romanian and some Slavic languages.

The commune is located in the western part of the county. It lies on the banks of the Caraș River.

Historical population
Year	Pop.	±%
1880	3,672	—
1910	3,717	+1.2%
1930	2,987	−19.6%
1977	2,395	−19.8%
2002	2,199	−8.2%
2011	1,956	−11.1%
2021	1,764	−9.8%
Source: Census data

== Natives ==
- Dorinel Munteanu (born 1968), football manager and former player
