= Ticvaniu Mare =

- Commune
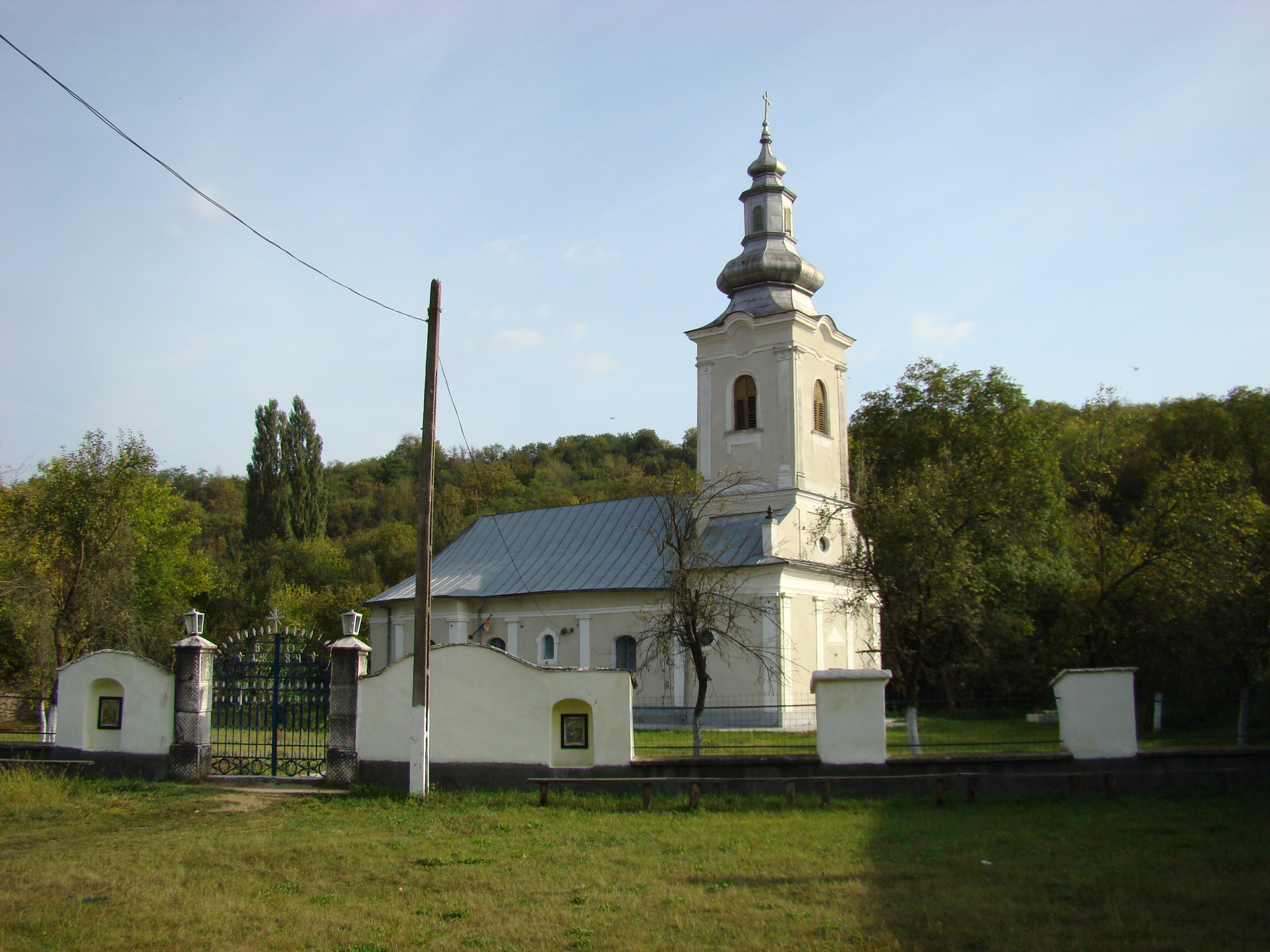
- Archangels church in Secășeni

- Coat of arms

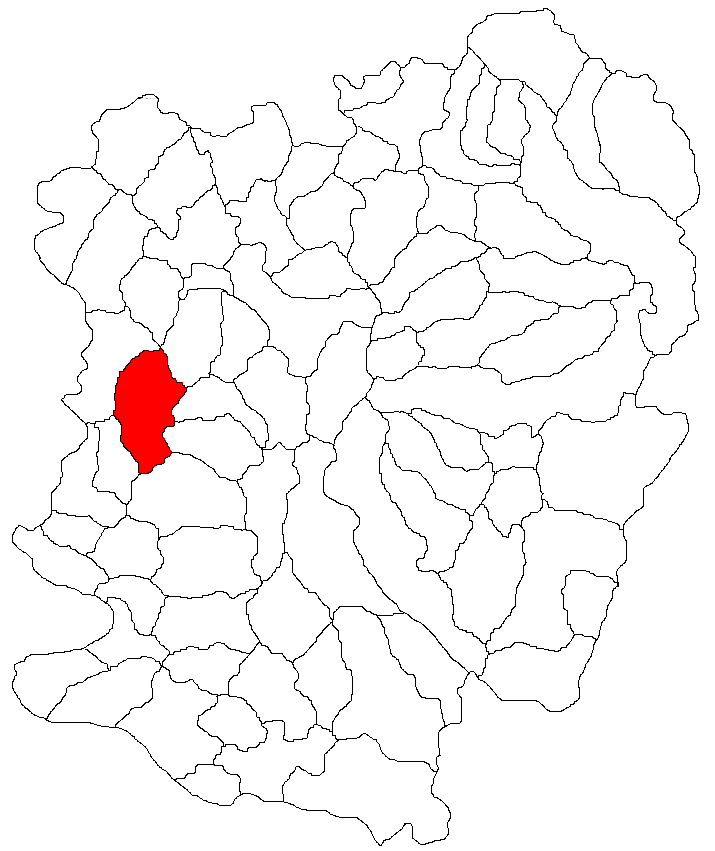
- Location in Caraș-Severin County

- Location in Romania
- Coordinates: 45°08′N 21°38′E
- Country: Romania
- County: Caraș-Severin

Government
  - Mayor (2024–2028): Ciprian Sebastian Măceșanu (PSD)
- Area: 128.86 km^{2} (49.75 sq mi)
- Elevation: 119 m (390 ft)
- Population (2021-12-01): 1,844
  - Density: 14.31/km^{2} (37.06/sq mi)
- Time zone: UTC+02:00 (EET)
  - Summer (DST): UTC+03:00 (EEST)
- Postal code: 327395
- Area code: (+40) 02 55
- Vehicle reg.: CS
- Website: primariaticvaniumare.ro

Ticvaniu Mare (Hungarian: Nagytikvány; Vlax Romani: Tikvaja Bare) is a commune in Caraș-Severin County, western Romania with a population of 1,844 as of 2021. It is composed of four villages: Cârnecea (Kernyécsa), Secășeni (Krassószékás), Ticvaniu Mare, and Ticvaniu Mic (Kistikvány).
