= Domașnea =

- Commune
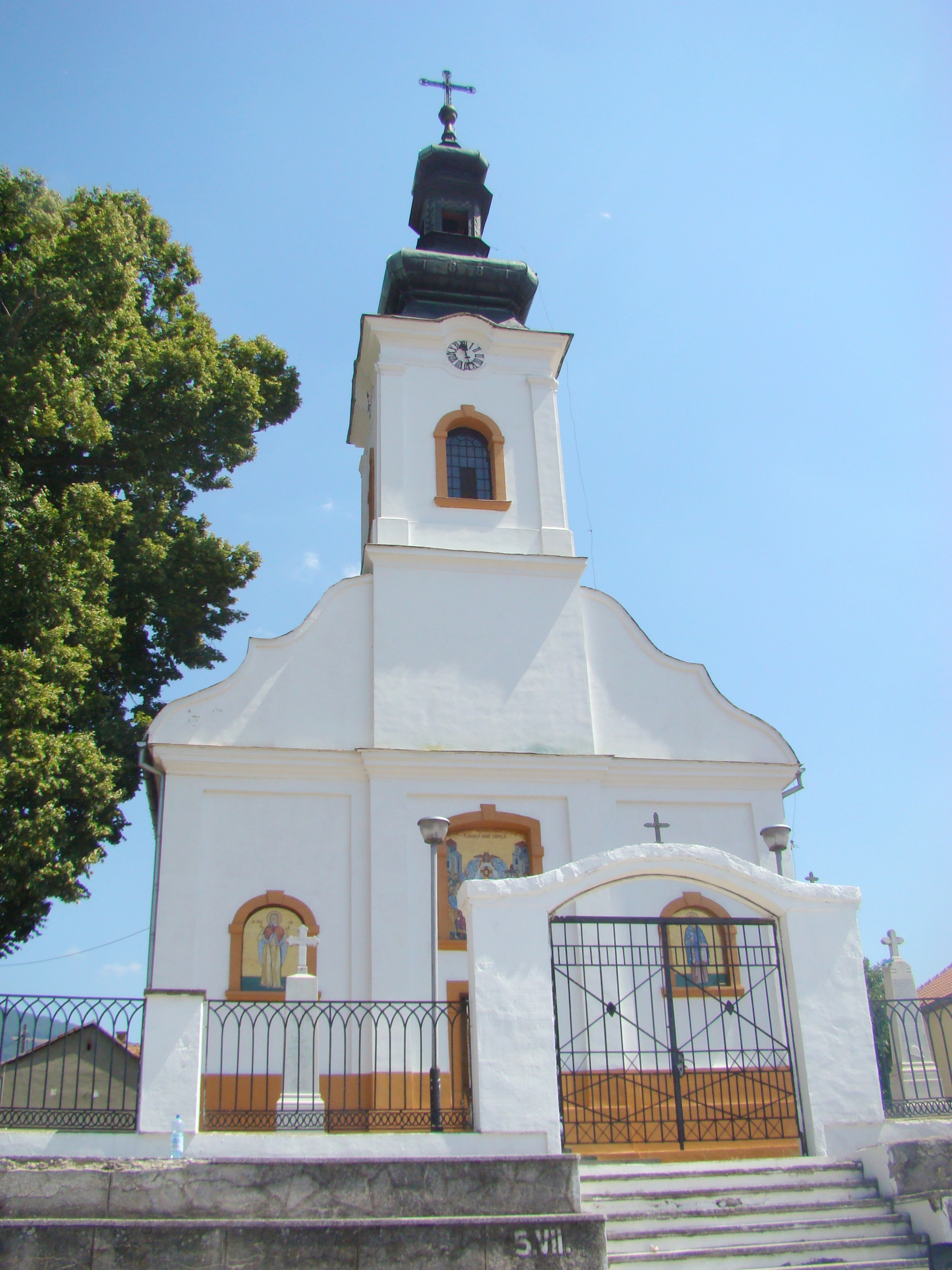
- St. Athanasius Church in Domașnea village

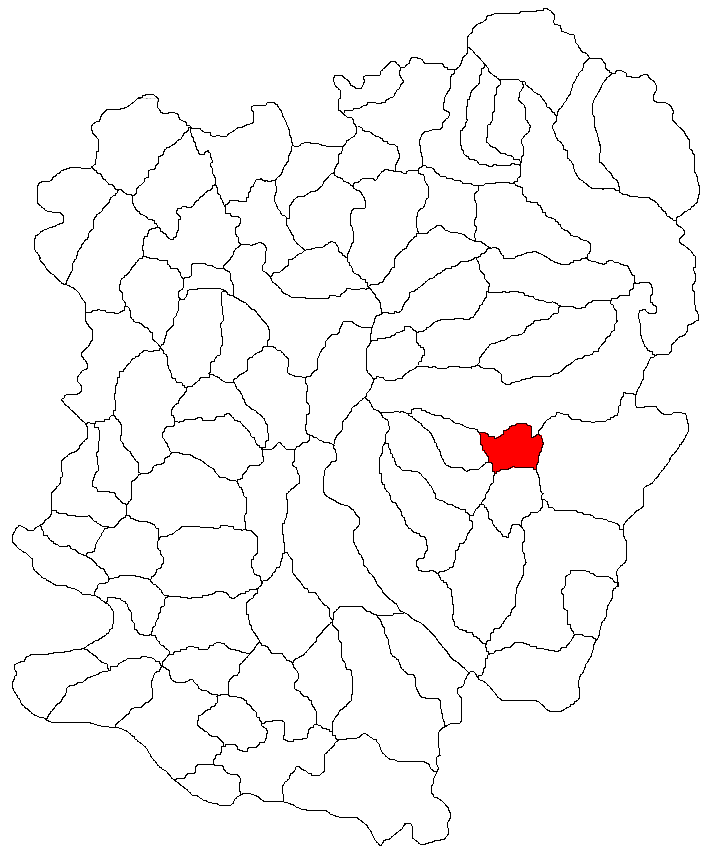
- Location in Caraș-Severin County

- Location in Romania
- Coordinates: 45°05′N 22°19′E
- Country: Romania
- County: Caraș-Severin

Government
  - Mayor (2020–2024): Ilie Mănescu (PNL)
- Area: 54.09 km^{2} (20.88 sq mi)
- Elevation: 492 m (1,614 ft)
- Population (2021-12-01): 1,053
  - Density: 19.47/km^{2} (50.42/sq mi)
- Time zone: UTC+02:00 (EET)
  - Summer (DST): UTC+03:00 (EEST)
- Postal code: 327185
- Area code: (+40) 02 55
- Vehicle reg.: CS
- Website: www.primaria-domasnea.ro

Domașnea (Hungarian: Domásnya) is a commune in Caraș-Severin County, western Romania with a population of 1,053 people as of 2021. It is composed of two villages, Cănicea (Szörénykanizsa) and Domașnea.

== Geography ==
The commune is situated at 492 m (1,614 ft) altitude in the south-west part of Romania, in the east-central part of Caraș-Severin County. Its total area is 54 ha (130 acres), having as neighbors Teregova to the north, Rusca to the northwest, Cornereva to the east, Cornea to the south, Mehadica to the southwest and Luncavița to the west. The distance between Domașnea and the county administrative center, Reșița, is 90 km (56 mi). The other important cities are Caransebeș at 45 km (28 mi) and Băile Herculane at 25 km (16 mi).

Domașnea is crossed south to north by national road DN6 (part of European route E70). The train station serves the CFR Line 900, which connects the capital of the country, Bucharest, to the western city of Timișoara.

The small river Domașnea, a tributary of the Luncavița, flows through the commune.

== Name ==
The name Domașnea comes from the Latin word "domus", plus the Latin suffix [(n)ia], meaning "the place with big houses". The Slavonian "domas" is a corrupt form of the same Latin word, and has the same meaning (house, domestic).

== History ==
After the great migrations period, according to a document published by the Hungarian historian Frigzes, Domașnea was mentioned for the first time in 1436. However, some new evidence, especially those made by Dr. Dimitrie Roman, bring up to light a document which indicates the fact that a group of houses were certainly located on the border of the village from 159 BC. This document it is a military Certificate issued on the name of a Celtic soldier named Ivornecus by the Roman emperor Hadrian, on 27 September 159 AD. This is a bronze tablet so named "Tabula Honestae Missions", and it is now stored at the Antiquity Museum in Vienna under the name D.XVII. At the confluence of the streams Domașnea and Cănicea, one km south of the village, there was a Roman camp named "Ad Pannonios".

In 1962 Domașnea was collectivized, being the only one of this area which was forced to adopt this system. The commune saw an outbreak of the anti-communist movement from the Banat region.

== Demographics ==
At the 2021 census, the commune had a population of 1,053, a decrease of almost 25% from the 2011 census, when there were 1,402 inhabitants in Domașnea.

Historical population
Year	Pop.	±%
1880	2,697	—
1910	2,617	−3.0%
1930	2,433	−7.0%
1977	1,948	−19.9%
2002	1,500	−23.0%
2011	1,402	−6.5%
2021	1,053	−24.9%
Source: Census data

== Natives ==
- Martin Jurchescu (1927–1996), mathematician

== Twin towns ==
Domașnea is twinned with:

- Civitella Roveto, Italy
