= Mehadica (river) =

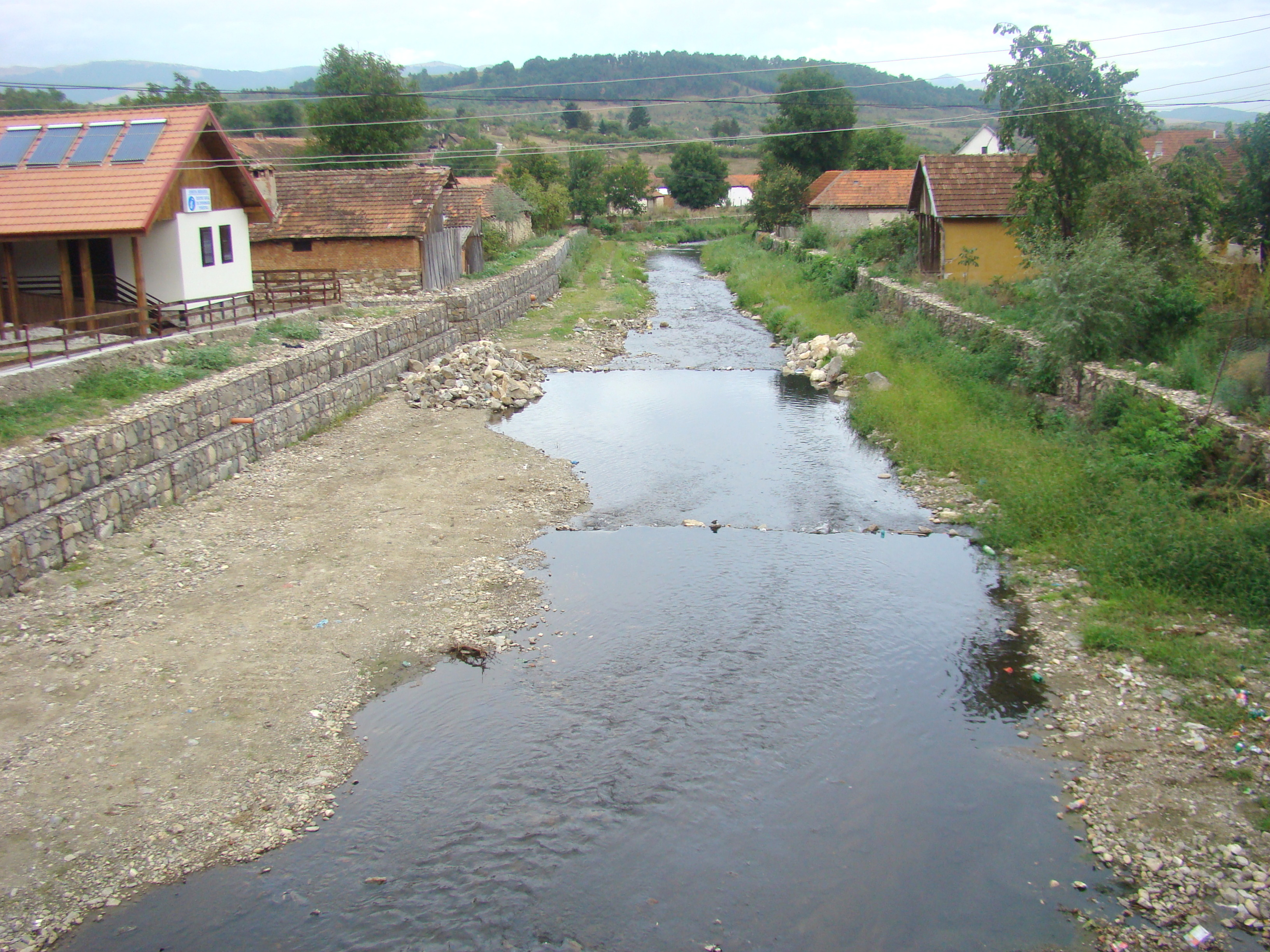

- Location within Romania

Location
- Country: Romania
- Counties: Caraș-Severin County
- Villages: Mehadica, Cuptoare, Crușovăț, Iablanița

Physical characteristics
- Mouth: Belareca
  - coordinates: 44.9210°N 22.3535°E
- Length: 46 km (29 mi)
- Basin size: 400 km^{2} (150 sq mi)

Basin features
- Progression: Belareca→ Cerna→ Danube→ Black Sea
- Tributaries
  - left: Verendin, Luncavița
  - right: Belenicia, Globu

The Mehadica is a right tributary of the river Belareca in Romania. It discharges into the Belareca near the village Mehadia. Its length is 46 km (29 mi) and its basin size is 400 km^{2} (150 sq mi).
