= Luncavița (Mehadica) =

- Location within Romania

Location
- Country: Romania
- Counties: Caraș-Severin County
- Villages: Luncavița, Cornea

Physical characteristics
- Source: Semenic Mountains
- Mouth: Mehadica
  - location: Crușovăț
  - coordinates: 45.0009°N 22.3146°E
- Length: 15 km (9.3 mi)
- Basin size: 101 km^{2} (39 sq mi)

Basin features
- Progression: Mehadica→ Belareca→ Cerna→ Danube→ Black Sea
- Tributaries
  - left: Domașnea, Cornea

The Luncavița is a left tributary of the river Mehadica in Romania. It flows into the Mehadica in Crușovăț. Its length is 15 km (9.3 mi) and its basin size is 101 km^{2} (39 sq mi).
