= Ciclova =

Ciclova may refer to several places in Caraș-Severin County, Romania:

- Ciclova Română, a commune
- Ciclova Montană, a village in Oravița town
- Ciclova (river), a tributary of the Caraș
