= Ocna =

Ocna ("the salt mine") may refer to several places in Romania:

- Ocna Mureș, a town in Alba County
- Ocna Sibiului, a town in Sibiu County
- Ocnele Mari, a town in Vâlcea County
- Târgu Ocna, a town in Bacău County
- Ocna de Fier, a commune in Caraș-Severin County
- Ocna Șugatag, a commune in Maramureș County
- Ocna de Jos and Ocna de Sus, villages in Praid Commune, Harghita County
- Ocna Dejului, a village in Dej city, Cluj County

and to:

- Ocna, the Romanian name for Vikno, Zastavna Raion, Ukraine
