= Săliște River =

Săliște River may refer to the following rivers in Romania:

- Săliște, a tributary of the Valea Mare in Cluj County
- Săliște, a tributary of the Globu in Caraș-Severin County
