= Ciclova (river) =

- Location within Romania

Location
- Country: Romania
- Counties: Caraș-Severin County
- Villages: Ciclova Română, Răcășdia, Vrăniuț

Physical characteristics
- Mouth: Caraș
  - location: Vrani
  - coordinates: 45.0502°N 21.4679°E
- Length: 33 km (21 mi)
- Basin size: 121 km^{2} (47 sq mi)

Basin features
- Progression: Karaš→ Danube→ Black Sea
- Tributaries
  - left: Vraniu
  - right: Ogașul Popii

The Ciclova (also: Valea Lungă) is a left tributary of the river Caraș (Karaš) in Romania. It discharges into the Caraș in Vrani. Its length is 33 km (21 mi) and its basin size is 121 km^{2} (47 sq mi).
