= Globu =

Globu Craiova
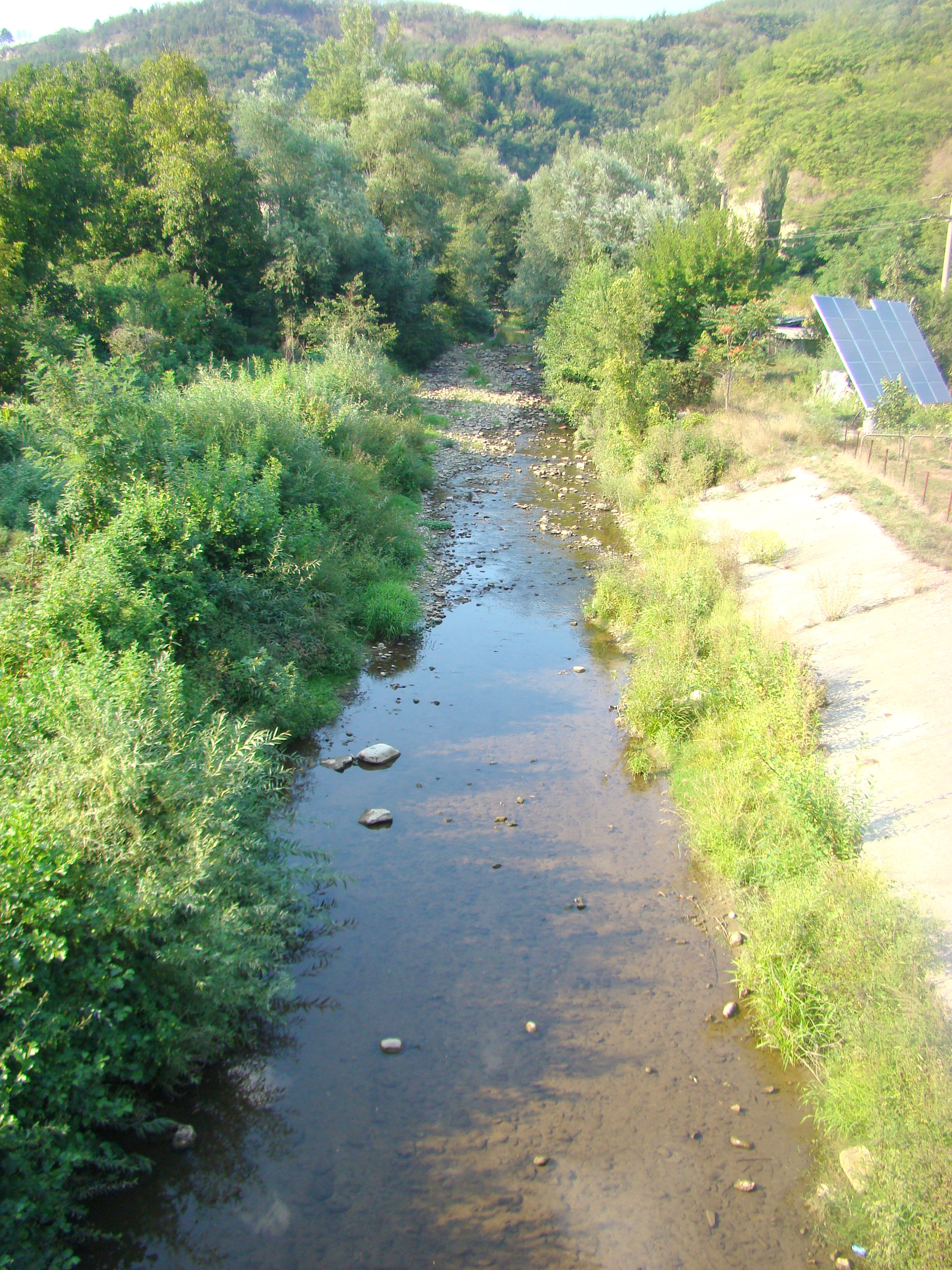

- Location within Romania

Location
- Country: Romania
- Counties: Caraș-Severin County
- Villages: Pârvova, Globu Craiovei, Petnic, Iablanița

Physical characteristics
- Mouth: Mehadica
  - coordinates: 44.9439°N 22.3227°E
- Length: 34 km (21 mi)
- Basin size: 141 km^{2} (54 sq mi)

Basin features
- Progression: Mehadica→ Belareca→ Cerna→ Danube→ Black Sea
- Tributaries
  - left: Slătinic
  - right: Lăpușnicel, Petnic, Săliște

The Globu is a right tributary of the river Mehadica in Romania. It discharges into the Mehadica in Iablanița. Its length is 34 km (21 mi) and its basin size is 141 km^{2} (54 sq mi).
