= Cuptoare =

Cuptoare may refer to several villages in Romania:

- Cuptoare, a district in the city of Reșița, Caraş-Severin County
- Cuptoare, a village in Cornea Commune, Caraş-Severin County
