= Răcășdia =

- Commune
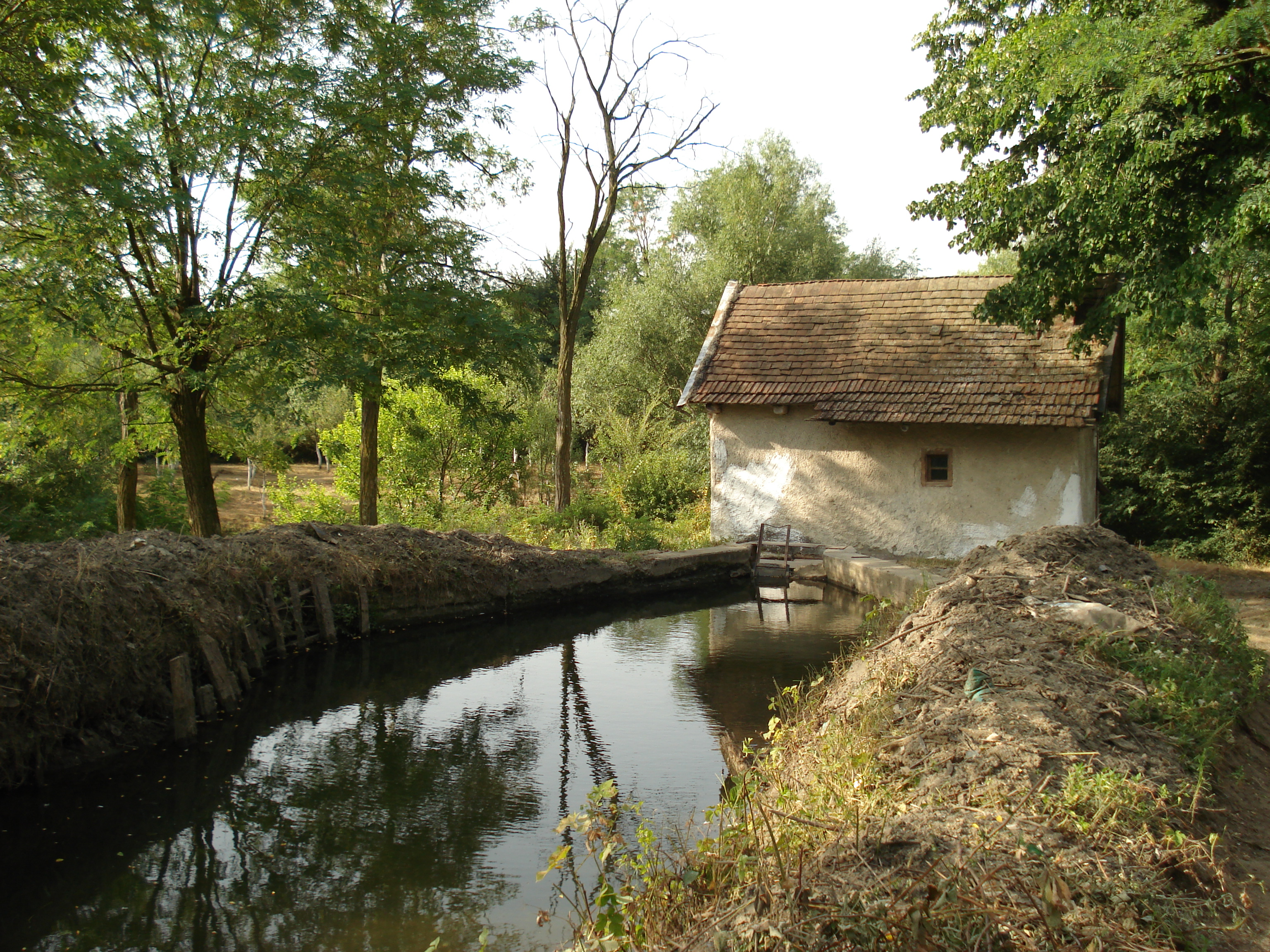
- Răcășdia village watermill

- Coat of arms

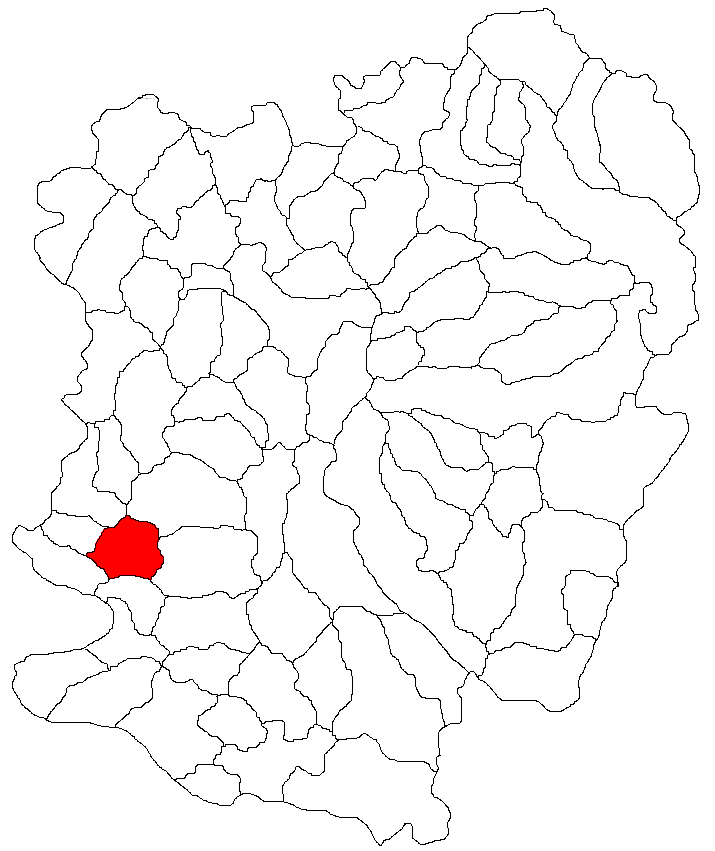
- Location in Caraș-Severin County

- Location in Romania
- Coordinates: 45°0′N 21°37′E
- Country: Romania
- County: Caraș-Severin

Government
  - Mayor (2024–2028): Nicoleta Lechici (PNL)
- Area: 61.15 km^{2} (23.61 sq mi)
- Elevation: 149 m (489 ft)
- Population (2021-12-01): 1,930
  - Density: 31.6/km^{2} (81.7/sq mi)
- Time zone: UTC+02:00 (EET)
  - Summer (DST): UTC+03:00 (EEST)
- Postal code: 327315
- Area code: +(40) 0255
- Vehicle reg.: CS
- Website: primariaracasdia.ro

Răcășdia (Hungarian: Rakasdia) is a commune in Caraș-Severin County, western Romania with a population of 1,930 as of 2021. It is composed of two villages, Răcășdia and Vrăniuț (Felsővarány).

The commune is located in the southwestern part of the Caraș-Severin County, 7 km (4.3 mi) from Oravița and 54 km (34 mi) from the county seat, Reșița. It lies on the banks of the river Ciclova and is crossed by national road DN57, which connects it to Moldova Nouă.

Historical population
Year	Pop.	±%
1880	4,680	—
1910	4,532	−3.2%
1930	3,976	−12.3%
1977	2,374	−40.3%
2002	2,180	−8.2%
2011	1,976	−9.4%
2021	1,930	−2.3%
Source: Census data

== Natives ==
- Cristian Danci (born 1988), footballer
