= Ramna, Caraș-Severin =

Ramna
- Commune
- Coat of arms

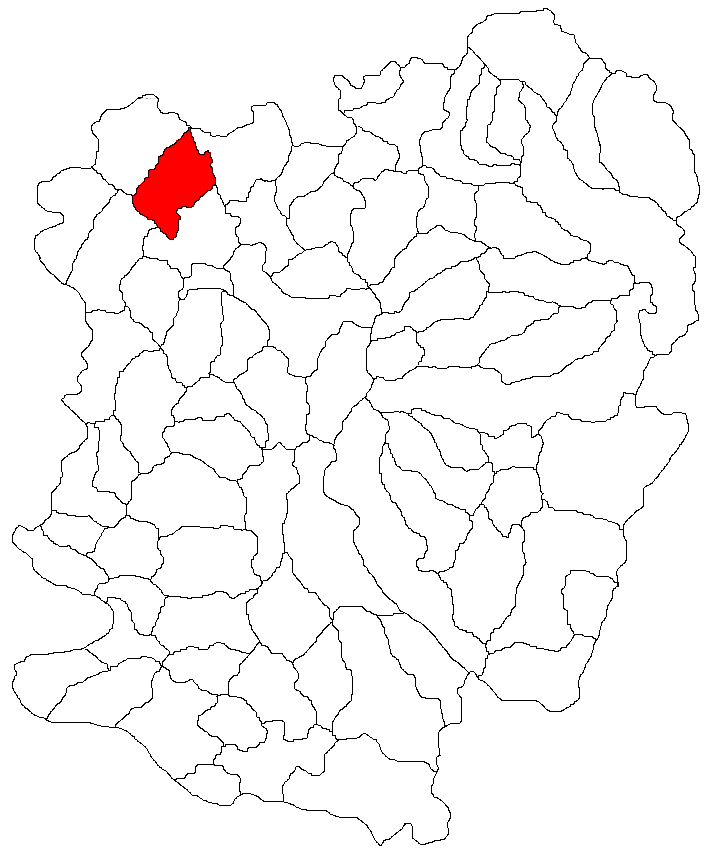
- Location in Caraș-Severin County

- Location in Romania
- Coordinates: 45°26′N 21°41′E
- Country: Romania
- County: Caraș-Severin

Government
  - Mayor (2024–2028): Magdalena Valeria Ciurea (PNL)
- Area: 99.1 km^{2} (38.3 sq mi)
- Elevation: 148 m (486 ft)
- Population (2021-12-01): 1,399
  - Density: 14.1/km^{2} (36.6/sq mi)
- Time zone: UTC+02:00 (EET)
  - Summer (DST): UTC+03:00 (EEST)
- Postal code: 327310
- Area code: +(40) 0255
- Vehicle reg.: CS
- Website: ramna.ro

Ramna (Hungarian: Rafna) is a commune in Caraș-Severin County, western Romania with a population of 1,399 as of 2021. It is composed of three villages: Bărbosu (Barbos), Ramna, and Valeapai (Valéapáj).

Historical population
Year	Pop.	±%
1880	4,031	—
1910	4,539	+12.6%
1930	4,188	−7.7%
1977	2,673	−36.2%
2002	1,782	−33.3%
2011	1,560	−12.5%
2021	1,399	−10.3%
Source: Census data
