= Zorlențu Mare =

- Commune
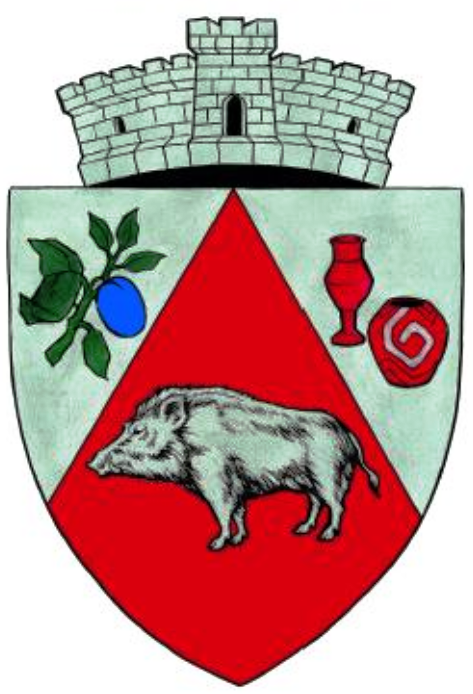
- Coat of arms

- Location in Caraș-Severin County

- Location in Romania
- Coordinates: 45°27′N 21°57′E
- Country: Romania
- County: Caraș-Severin

Government
  - Mayor (2020–2024): Ion-Marius Ișfan (PNL)
- Area: 66.10 km^{2} (25.52 sq mi)
- Elevation: 192 m (630 ft)
- Population (2021-12-01): 873
  - Density: 13/km^{2} (34/sq mi)
- Time zone: EET/EEST (UTC+2/+3)
- Postal code: 327450
- Area code: (+40) 02 55
- Vehicle reg.: CS
- Website: primariazorlentumare.ro

Zorlențu Mare (Hungarian: Alsózorlenc) is a commune in Caraș-Severin County, western Romania, with a population of 873 people as of 2021. It is composed of two villages, Zorlencior (Felsőzorlenc) and Zorlențu Mare.

== Demographics ==
According to the 2021 census, Zorlențu Mare had a population of 873 and the population density was 13/km^{2}.

- Romanians – 79.4%
- Unknown ethnicity – 20.6%
