= Lăpușnicel =

- Commune
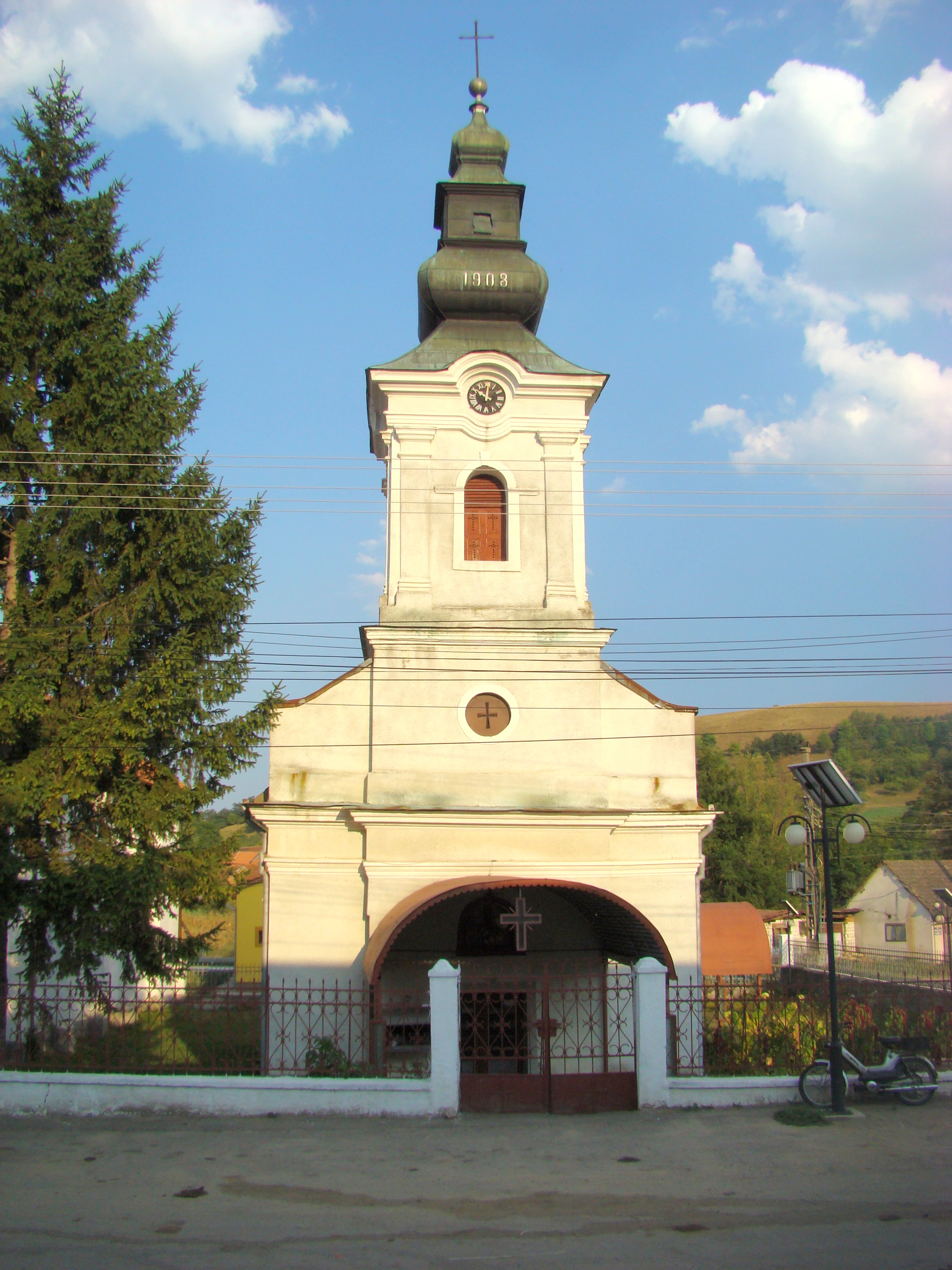
- Orthodox church in Lăpușnicel village

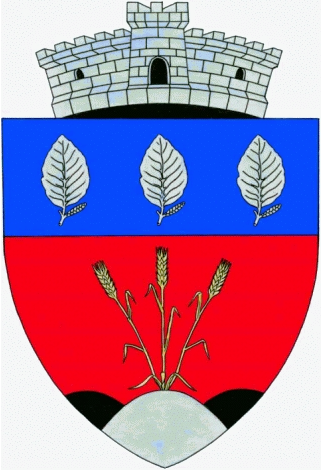
- Coat of arms

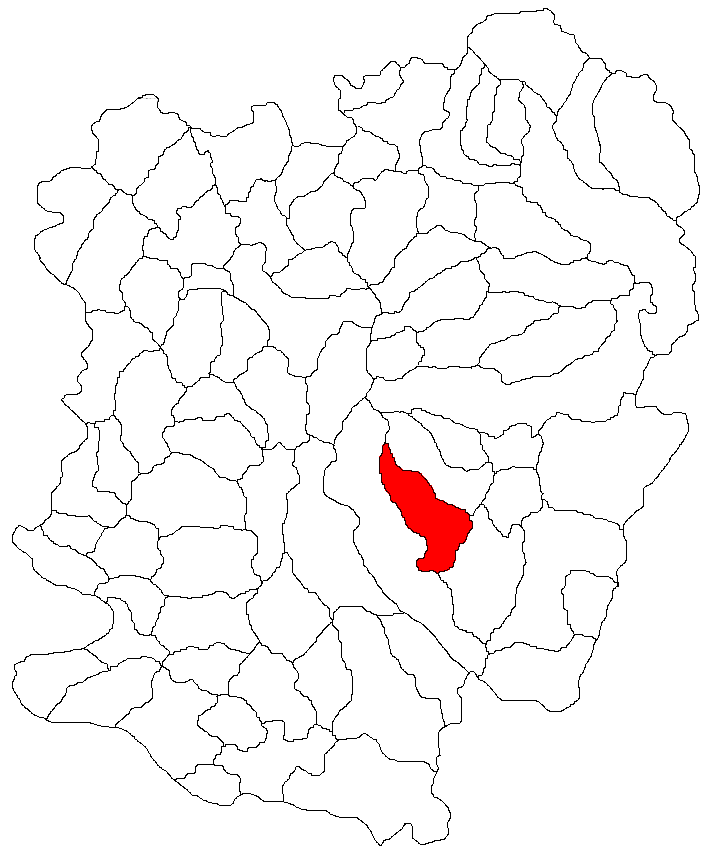
- Location in Caraș-Severin County

- Location in Romania
- Coordinates: 44°59′N 22°14′E
- Country: Romania
- County: Caraș-Severin

Government
  - Mayor (2024–2028): Ilie Canea (PSD)
- Area: 27.09 km^{2} (10.46 sq mi)
- Elevation: 389 m (1,276 ft)
- Population (2021-12-01): 771
  - Density: 28.5/km^{2} (73.7/sq mi)
- Time zone: UTC+02:00 (EET)
  - Summer (DST): UTC+03:00 (EEST)
- Postal code: 327240
- Area code: (+40) 02 55
- Vehicle reg.: CS
- Website: lapusnicel.eu

Lăpușnicel (Hungarian: Kislaposnok) is a commune in Caraș-Severin County, western Romania with a population of 771 people as of 2021. It is composed of three villages, Lăpușnicel, Pârvova (Porhó), and Șumița (Cseherdős, Czech: Šumice).

The commune is located in the central part of the county, 72 km (45 mi) south of Caransebeș and 36 km (22 mi) north of Băile Herculane. It lies on the banks of the river Globu, at an altitude of 389 m (1,276 ft).

Historical population
Year	Pop.	±%
1880	2,102	—
1910	2,634	+25.3%
1930	2,542	−3.5%
1977	2,145	−15.6%
2002	1,320	−38.5%
2011	1,081	−18.1%
2021	771	−28.7%
Source: Census data

At the 2021 census, Lăpușnicel had 771 inhabitants; of those, 85.21% were Romanians and 7.26% Czechs.
