= Vrani =

- Commune
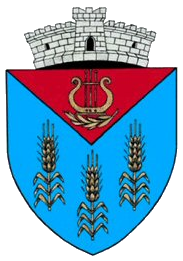
- Coat of arms

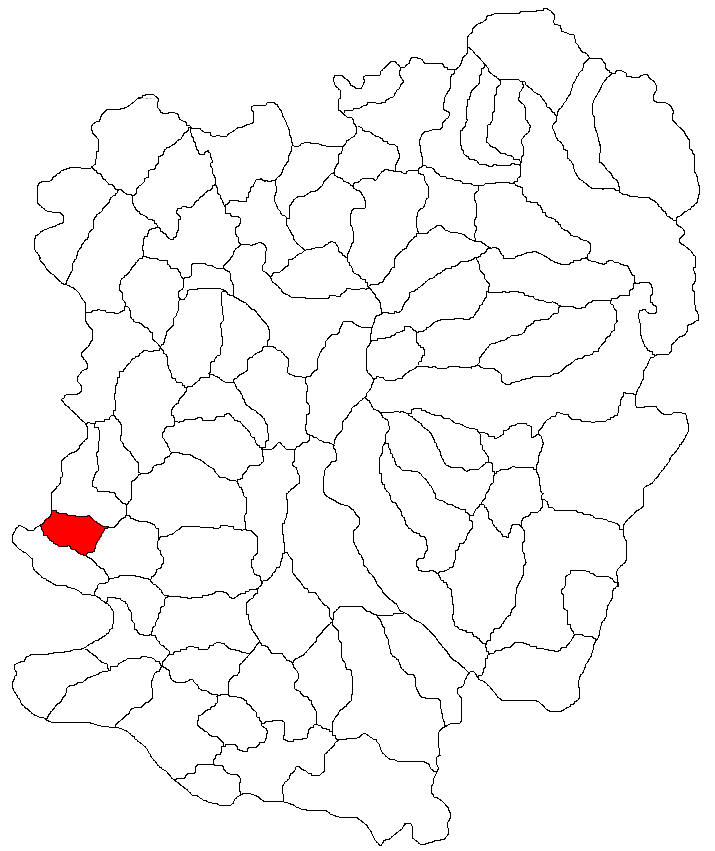
- Location in Caraș-Severin County

- Location in Romania
- Coordinates: 45°02′N 21°30′E
- Country: Romania
- County: Caraș-Severin

Government
  - Mayor (2024–2028): Răzvan Nicolae Otiman (PNL)
- Area: 46.50 km^{2} (17.95 sq mi)
- Elevation: 88 m (289 ft)
- Population (2021-12-01): 1,007
  - Density: 21.66/km^{2} (56.09/sq mi)
- Time zone: UTC+02:00 (EET)
  - Summer (DST): UTC+03:00 (EEST)
- Postal code: 327430
- Area code: (+40) 02 55
- Vehicle reg.: CS
- Website: primaria-vrani.ro

Vrani (Hungarian: Alsóvarány) is a commune in Caraș-Severin County, western Romania with a population of 1,007 people as of 2021. It is composed of three villages: Ciortea (Csorda), Iertof (Hévér), and Vrani.

The commune is located in the southwestern part of the county, on the border with Serbia. It lies on the banks of the Caraș River and its left tributary, the Ciclova, at a distance of 20 km (12 mi) from the town of Oravița and 60 km (37 mi) from the county seat, Reșița.

== Demographics ==
According to the 2021 census, Vrani had a population of 1,007; of those, 85.3% were Romanians, 9.0% were Roma, and 5.7% were of unknown ethnicity. The population density was 22/km².
