= Ana Pacatiuș =

Romanian folk singer

- Born: 2 August 1939 (age 86); Iablanița, Kingdom of Romania
- Occupations: Folk singer; lecturer
- Formerly of: Banatul Ensemble

Ana Pacatiuș (born 2 August 1939) is a Romanian folk singer, who specialises in the folk traditions of Banat. In 1970 she joined the Banatul Ensemble, with whom she toured to China, Mongolia, and the Soviet Union as the only vocal soloist.

== Biography ==
Pacatiuș was born on 2 August 1939 in Iablanița, a village in the Banat region of western Romania. She was educated at the Music High School in Timișoara, where she was taught classical and folk singing by notable musicians, such as Marieta Grebenișan, Magdalena Ursu, and Vasile Ijac. After graduation, Pacatiuș specialised in the folk traditions of Banat and joined an orchestra from Caransebeș, with which she began to tour. In 1970 she joined the Banatul Ensemble, with which she toured to China, Mongolia, and the Soviet Union as the only vocal soloist.

In 1973 she joined the Timișoara State Opera, and started teaching popular music at the School of Arts in Timișoara. She recorded music with many performers, including Trandafir Jurjovan, Dumitru Chepețan and others. In 2013 she was a soloist at the Ioan Macrea National Folk Festival. In 2019 she appeared on the entertainment show Drag de România mea with folk singer Angelica Stoican.

Contemporary folk artist Roxana Mag has cited Pacatiuș's teaching as an inspiration for her career. Pacatiuș's contributions have also been officially recognised with a National Medal for Loyal Service, the Ethnos Award, and a Diploma of Excellence.
