= Cristian Danci =

Romanian professional footballer

Personal information
- Date of birth: 15 July 1988 (age 38)
- Place of birth: Răcășdia, Romania
- Height: 1.79 m (5 ft 10 in)
- Position: Central midfielder

Team information
- Current team: Nera Bogodinț
- Number: 13

Youth career
- 1997–2006: LPS Banatul Timișoara

Senior career*
Years	Team	Apps	(Gls)
2006–2008	Politehnica II Timişoara	38	(2)
2008–2011	Liberty Salonta	20	(0)
2010–2011	→ Bihor Oradea (loan)	31	(3)
2011–2012	Bihor Oradea	17	(0)
2012–2013	Fortuna Brazi	10	(1)
2013	Metalul Reșița	7	(0)
2014–2015	Botoşani	38	(1)
2015	→ Șoimii Pâncota	15	(1)
2016–2017	Gaz Metan Mediaș	49	(0)
2018	Hermannstadt	10	(0)
2018	Petrolul Ploiești	11	(0)
2019	Gloria Buzău	6	(0)
2019–2021	CSM Reșița	43	(5)
2021–2023	Voința Lupac	62	(15)
2024	Voința Răcășdia	3	(4)
2024–	Nera Bogodinț	4	(3)

Managerial career
- 2021–2023: Voința Lupac (assistant)
- * Club domestic league appearances and goals as of 14:50, 29 December 2024 (UTC)

Cristian Danci (born 15 July 1988) is a Romanian professional footballer who plays as a midfielder for Nera Bogodinț.

== Honours ==
Hermannstadt

- Cupa României: Runner-up 2017–18

SCM Gloria Buzău

- Liga III: 2018–19
