= Târnova, Caraș-Severin =

Târnova
- Commune
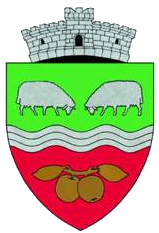
- Coat of arms

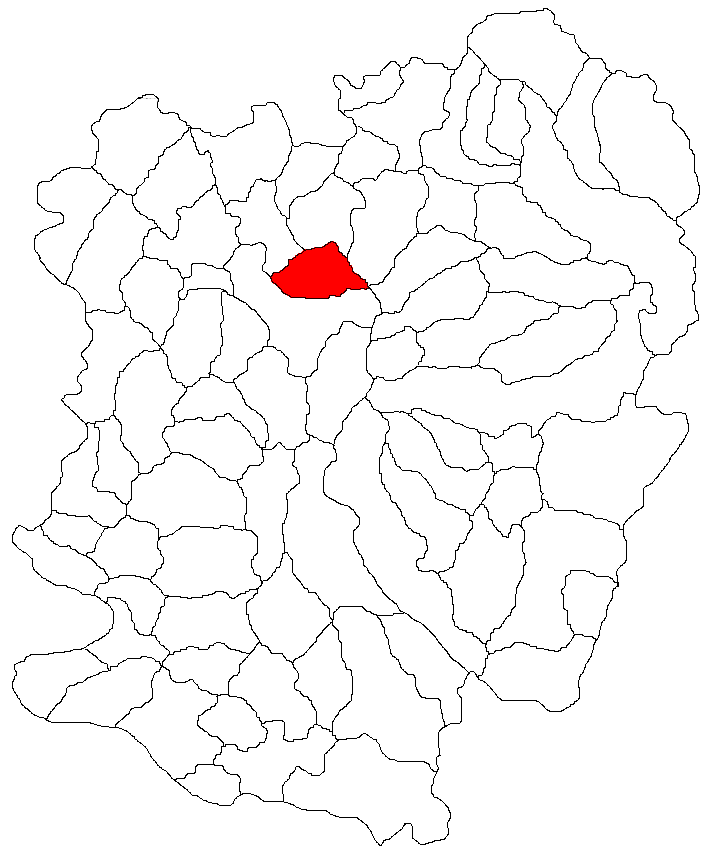
- Location in Caraș-Severin County

- Location in Romania
- Coordinates: 44°51′N 21°52′E
- Country: Romania
- County: Caraș-Severin

Government
  - Mayor (2024–2028): Walter Florea (PNL)
- Area: 49.66 km^{2} (19.17 sq mi)
- Elevation: 385 m (1,263 ft)
- Population (2021-12-01): 1,499
  - Density: 30.19/km^{2} (78.18/sq mi)
- Time zone: UTC+02:00 (EET)
  - Summer (DST): UTC+03:00 (EEST)
- Postal code: 327385
- Area code: (+40) 02 55
- Vehicle reg.: CS
- Website: tarnova.ro

Târnova (Hungarian: Tornó) is a commune in Caraș-Severin County, western Romania with a population of 1,499 as of 2021. It is composed of two villages, Bratova and Târnova.
