= Mehadica =

- Commune
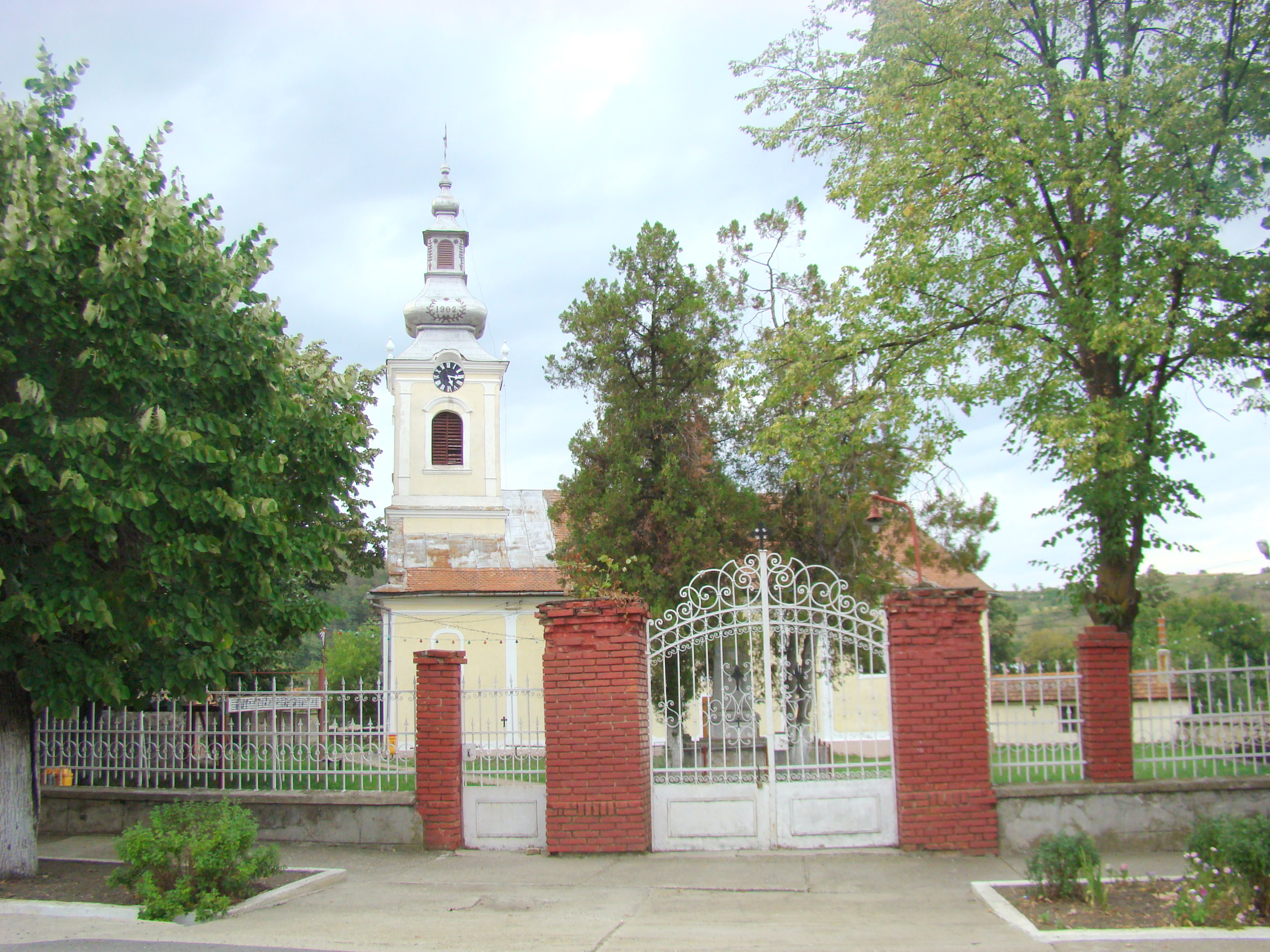
- Church of the Nativity in Mehadica

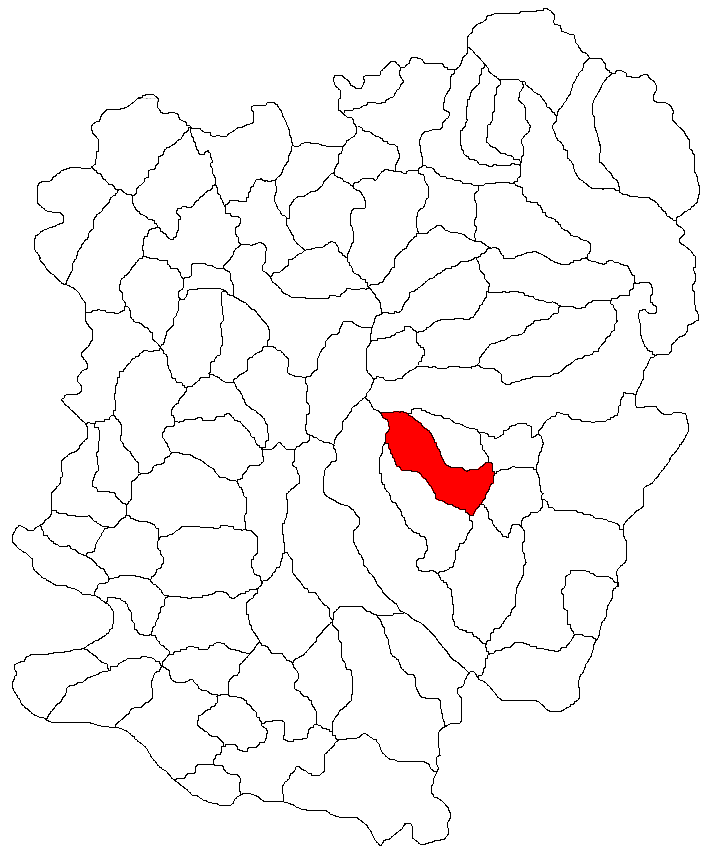
- Location in Caraș-Severin County

- Location in Romania
- Coordinates: 45°02′N 22°16′E
- Country: Romania
- County: Caraș-Severin

Government
  - Mayor (2020–2024): Ion Urechiatu (PNL)
- Area: 118.03 km^{2} (45.57 sq mi)
- Population (2021-12-01): 601
  - Density: 5.09/km^{2} (13.2/sq mi)
- Time zone: UTC+02:00 (EET)
  - Summer (DST): UTC+03:00 (EEST)
- Postal code: 327275
- Vehicle reg.: CS
- Website: mehadica.ro

Mehadica (Hungarian: Mehadika) is a commune along Mehadica River in Caraș-Severin County, Banat region, in western Romania. It is composed of a single village, Mehadica, with a population of 870 people as of 2011.
