= Ocna de Fier =

- Commune
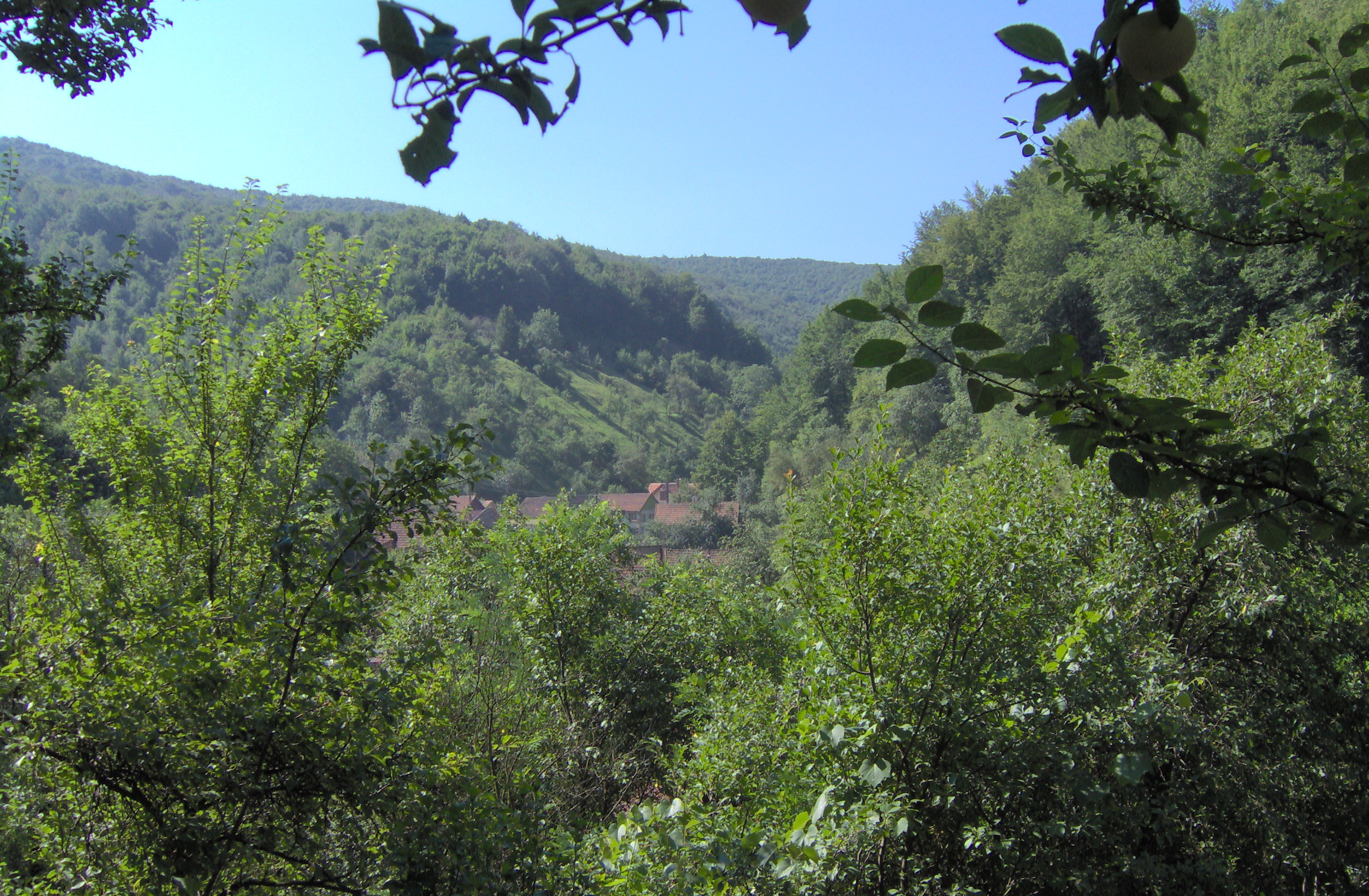

- Coat of arms

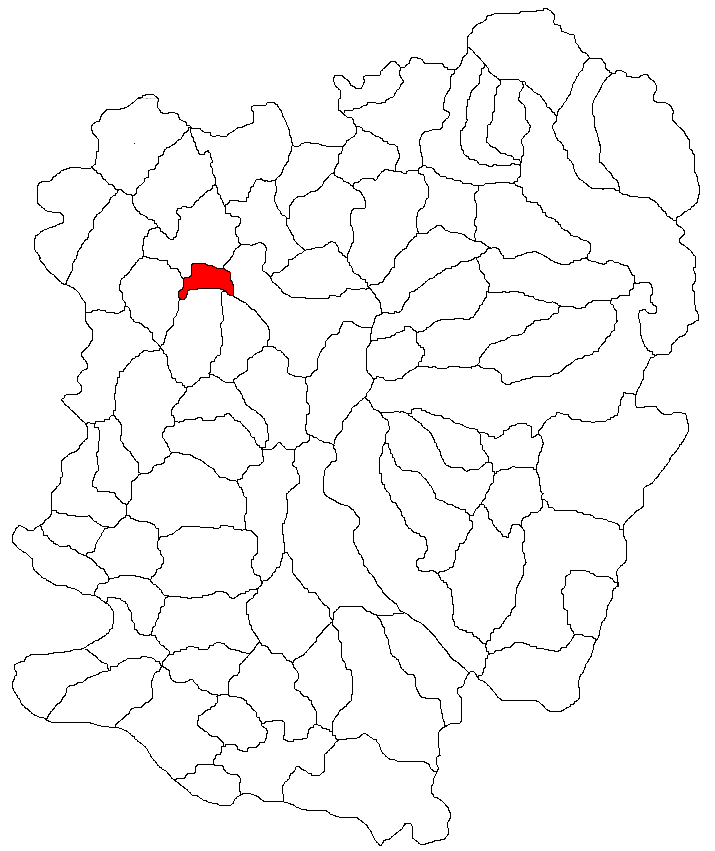
- Location in Caraș-Severin County

- Location in Romania
- Coordinates: 45°20′31″N 21°46′35″E
- Country: Romania
- County: Caraș-Severin

Government
  - Mayor (2024–2028): Petru Petrișor Panescu (PNL)
- Area: 22.11 km^{2} (8.54 sq mi)
- Elevation: 310 m (1,020 ft)
- Population (2021-12-01): 569
  - Density: 25.7/km^{2} (66.7/sq mi)
- Time zone: UTC+02:00 (EET)
  - Summer (DST): UTC+03:00 (EEST)
- Postal code: 327290
- Area code: +(40) 0255
- Vehicle reg.: CS
- Website: www.ocnadefier.ro

Ocna de Fier (Hungarian: Vaskő, German: Eisenstein) is a commune in Caraș-Severin County, in the Banat region of southwestern Romania. It is composed of a single village, Ocna de Fier.

== History ==
Along with the Dognecea area, Ocna de Fier is among the few settlements in the world that supported almost continuous mining for some 4000 years.

Archaeological evidence shows that mining in the area dates back to the Bronze Age (1900–1700 BC). The main ore exploited in those times was native copper from the oxidation zone of the deposit. Later on, iron ores brought about a gradual switch from copper to iron mining.

Mining was an activity of the Dacians, the ancient inhabitants of present-day Romania. After the Roman conquest in 106, mining was expanded in the Roman province of Dacia. At Berzovis (present day Berzovia, ten kilometres northwest of Ocna de Fier) a Roman metallurgy school, Schola fabrorum, was established, showing the keen interest the Romans had in metal extraction. At Cracul cu Aur (Romanian for "Golden Tributary"), north of Ocna de Fier, old Roman gold mining galleries can still be seen. They look like the much better preserved ones at Roșia Montană, in the Apuseni Mountains.

The Constantin Gruescu Iron Aesthetic Mineralogy Museum is located in Ocna de Fier.

Historical population
| Year | Pop. | ±% |
|---|---|---|
| 1880 | 1,012 | — |
| 1910 | 1,332 | +31.6% |
| 1966 | 1,853 | +39.1% |
| 1977 | 1,422 | −23.3% |
| 1992 | 907 | −36.2% |
| 2002 | 792 | −12.7% |
| 2011 | 656 | −17.2% |
| 2021 | 569 | −13.3% |
Source: Census data
