= Iablanița =

- Commune
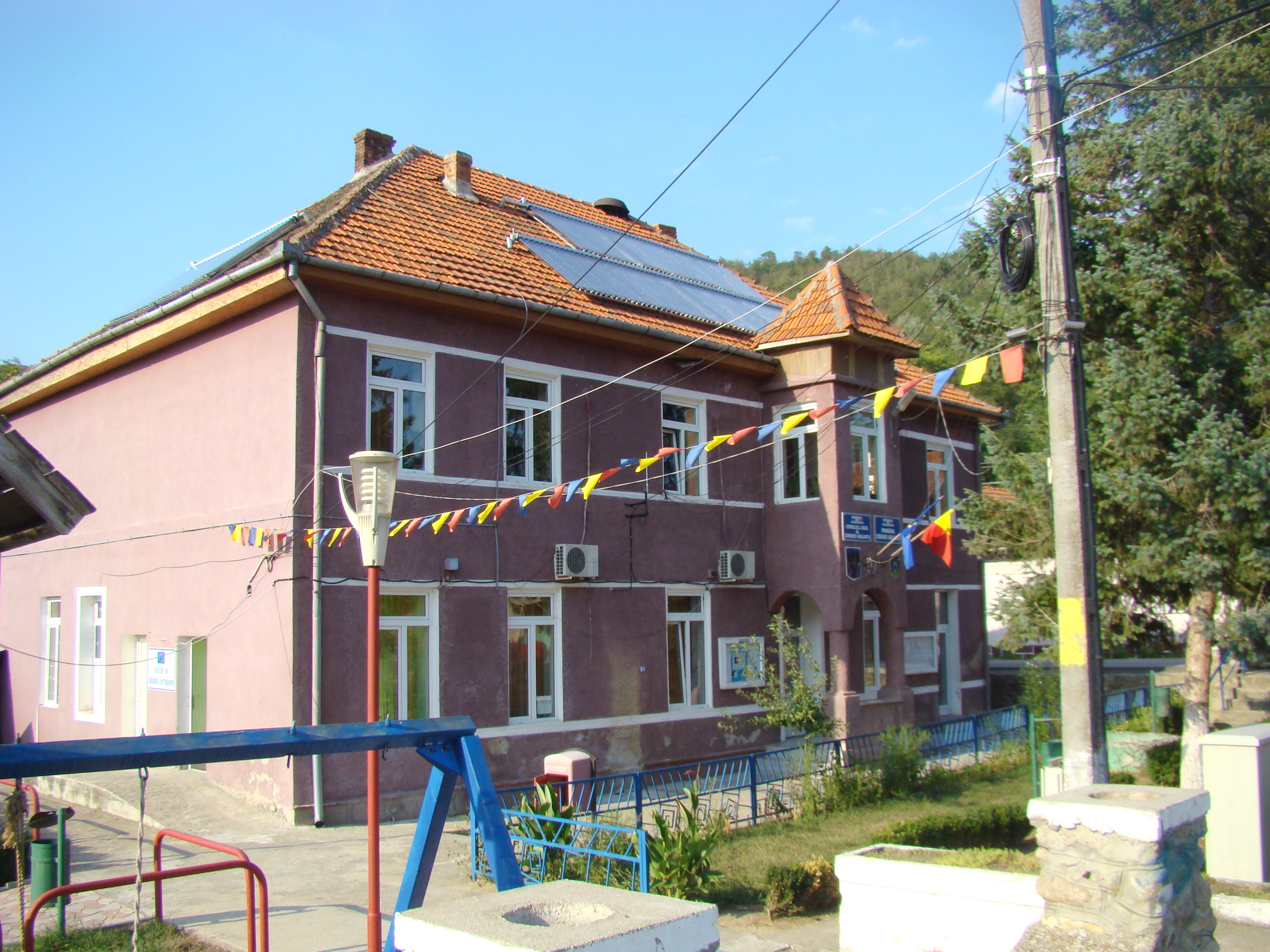
- Iablanița town hall

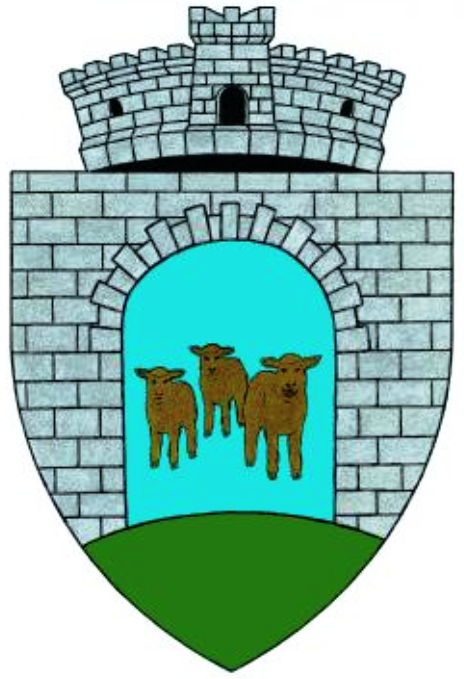
- Coat of arms

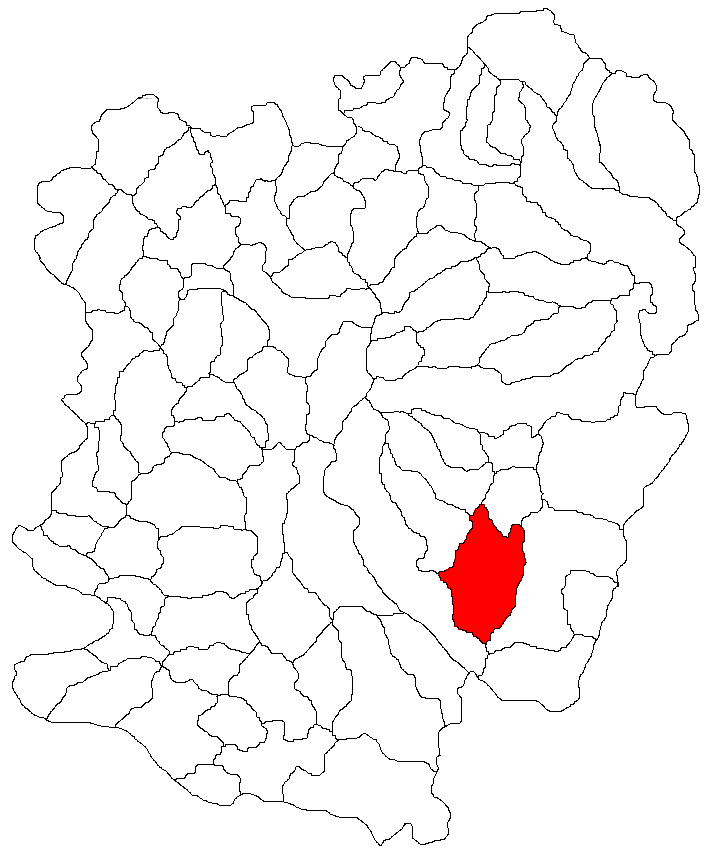
- Location in Caraș-Severin County

- Location in Romania
- Coordinates: 44°57′01″N 22°18′51″E
- Country: Romania
- County: Caraș-Severin

Government
  - Mayor (2020–2024): Victor Terteleacă (PMP)
- Area: 115.55 km^{2} (44.61 sq mi)
- Elevation: 236 m (774 ft)
- Population (2021-12-01): 1,880
  - Density: 16.3/km^{2} (42.1/sq mi)
- Time zone: UTC+02:00 (EET)
  - Summer (DST): UTC+03:00 (EEST)
- Postal code: 327235
- Area code: (+40) 0255
- Vehicle reg.: CS
- Website: primariaiablanita.ro

Iablanița (Hungarian: Bélajablánc) is a commune in Caraș-Severin County, western Romania. It is composed of three villages: Globu Craiovei (Globukrajova, formerly Kiskirálymező), Iablanița, and Petnic (Petnek).

The commune is located in the southeastern part of the county, 60 km (37 mi) south of the city of Caransebeș and 96 km (60 mi) southeast of the county seat, Reșița. It is crossed by national road DN57B, which connects it to Bozovici commune, 40 km (25 mi) to the west, and to DN6 (part of European route E70), 4 km (2.5 mi) to the east.

Historical population
Year	Pop.	±%
1850	3,423	—
1910	4,042	+18.1%
1930	3,654	−9.6%
1977	3,034	−17.0%
2002	2,661	−12.3%
2011	2,281	−14.3%
2021	1,880	−17.6%
Source: Census data

At the 2011 census, the commune had 2,281 inhabitants; of those whose ethnicity was recorded, 98.6% were Romanians and 1.3% Roma. In terms of religious affiliation, 90% were Romanian Orthodox and 9.3% Baptist. At the 2021 census, Iablanița had a population of 1,880; of those, 96.17% were Romanians.

Attractions include an 1836 wooden church in Globu Craiovei and the 1825 Iablanița church, both historic monuments; and a nature reserve.

== Notable people ==
- Ana Pacatiuș (born 1939), Romanian folk singer
