= Luncavița, Caraș-Severin =

Luncavița
- Commune
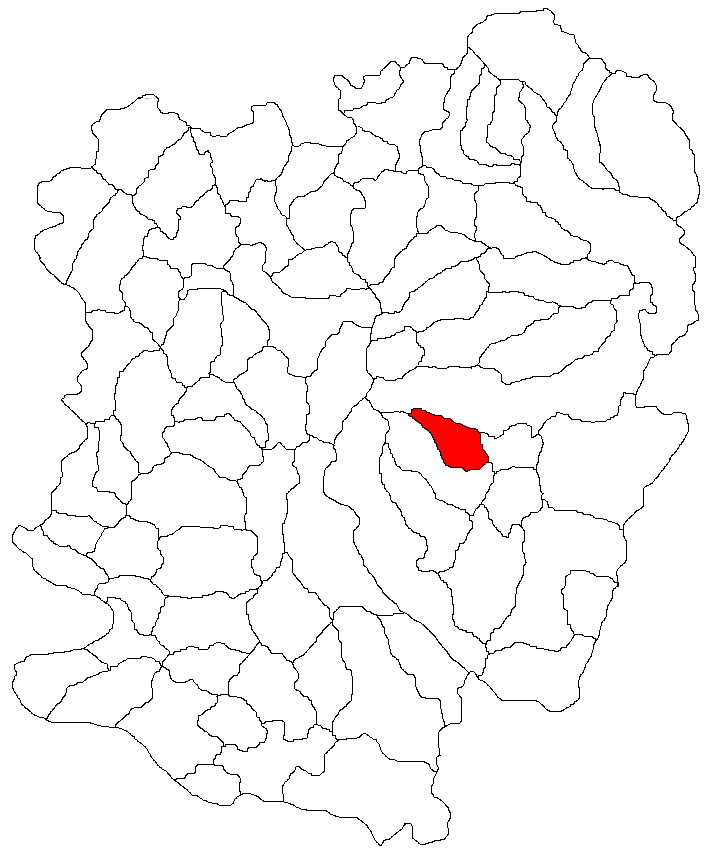
- Location in Caraș-Severin County

- Location in Romania
- Coordinates: 45°5′N 22°16′E
- Country: Romania
- County: Caraș-Severin
- Population (2021-12-01): 2,142
- Time zone: EET/EEST (UTC+2/+3)
- Vehicle reg.: CS

Luncavița (Hungarian: Nagylankás) is a commune in Caraș-Severin County, western Romania with a population of 2,944 people. It is composed of two villages, Luncavița and Verendin (Verend).
