= Ciclova Română =

- Commune
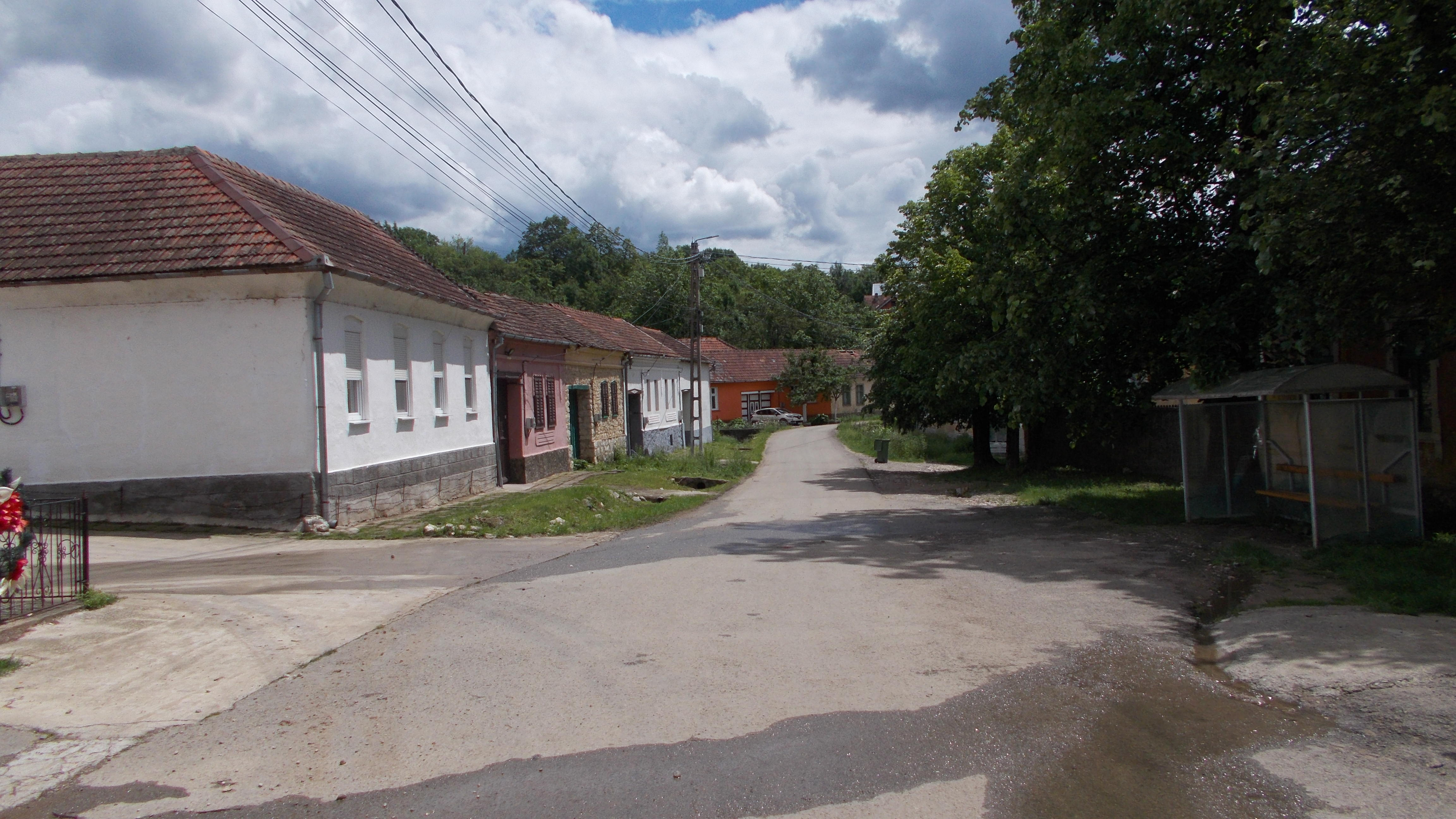
- Socolari village

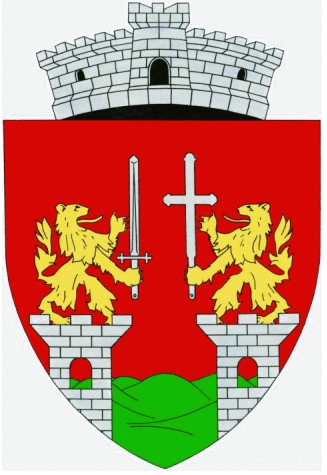
- Coat of arms

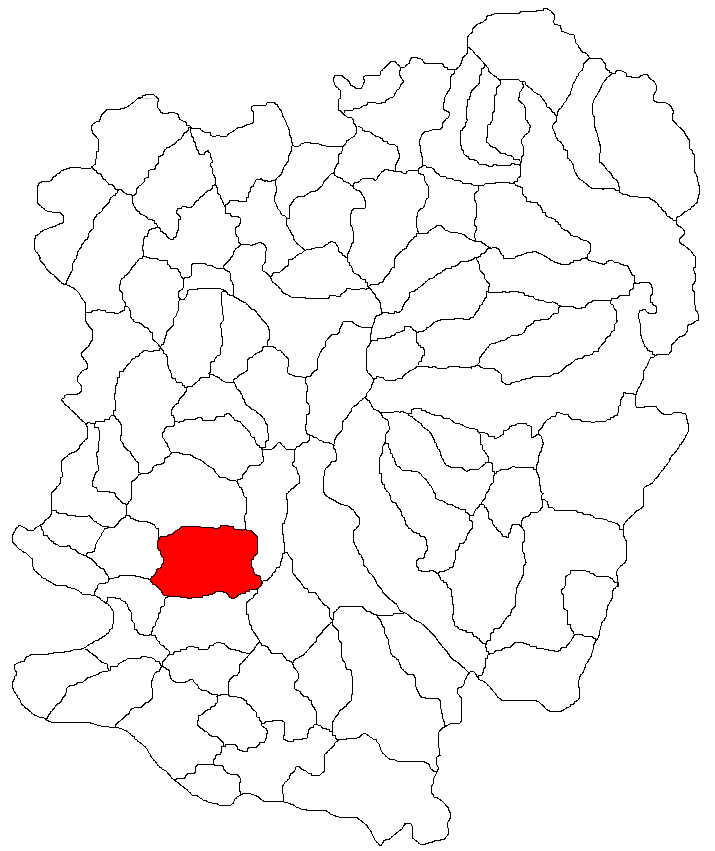
- Location in Caraș-Severin County

- Location in Romania
- Coordinates: 45°0′49″N 21°43′9″E
- Country: Romania
- County: Caraș-Severin

Government
  - Mayor (2020–2024): Mircea-Cătălin Golu (PNL)
- Area: 112.62 km^{2} (43.48 sq mi)
- Elevation: 227 m (745 ft)
- Population (2021-12-01): 1,592
  - Density: 14.14/km^{2} (36.61/sq mi)
- Time zone: UTC+02:00 (EET)
  - Summer (DST): UTC+03:00 (EEST)
- Postal code: 327075
- Area code: (+40) 0255
- Vehicle reg.: CS
- Website: comunaciclovaromana.ro

Ciclova Română (Hungarian: Csiklófalu) is a commune in Caraș-Severin County, western Romania with a population of 1,592 people as of 2021. It is composed of three villages: Ciclova Română, Ilidia (Illyéd), and Socolari (Szakalár).

The commune is located in the southwestern part of the county, about 50 km (31 mi) from the county seat, Reșița.

Historical population
Year	Pop.	±%
1880	6,676	—
1910	6,616	−0.9%
1930	5,631	−14.9%
1977	2,731	−51.5%
2002	1,814	−33.6%
2011	1,550	−14.6%
2021	1,592	+2.7%
Source: Census data
