= Cornea, Caraș-Severin =

Cornea
- Commune
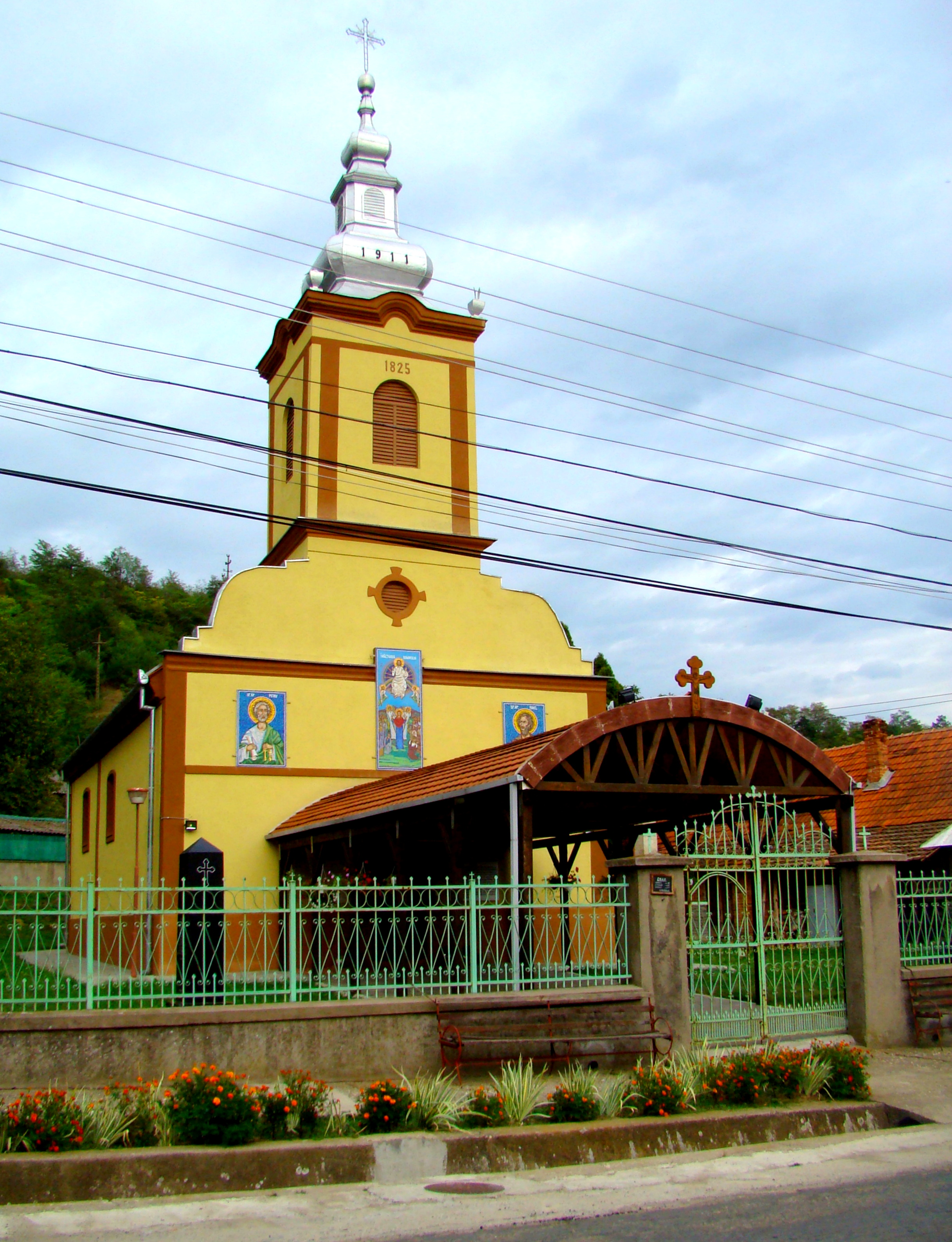
- Church of the Ascension of the Lord in Cuptoare

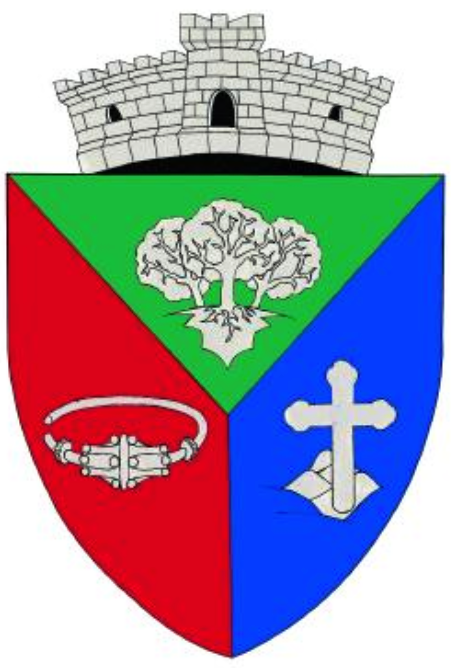
- Coat of arms

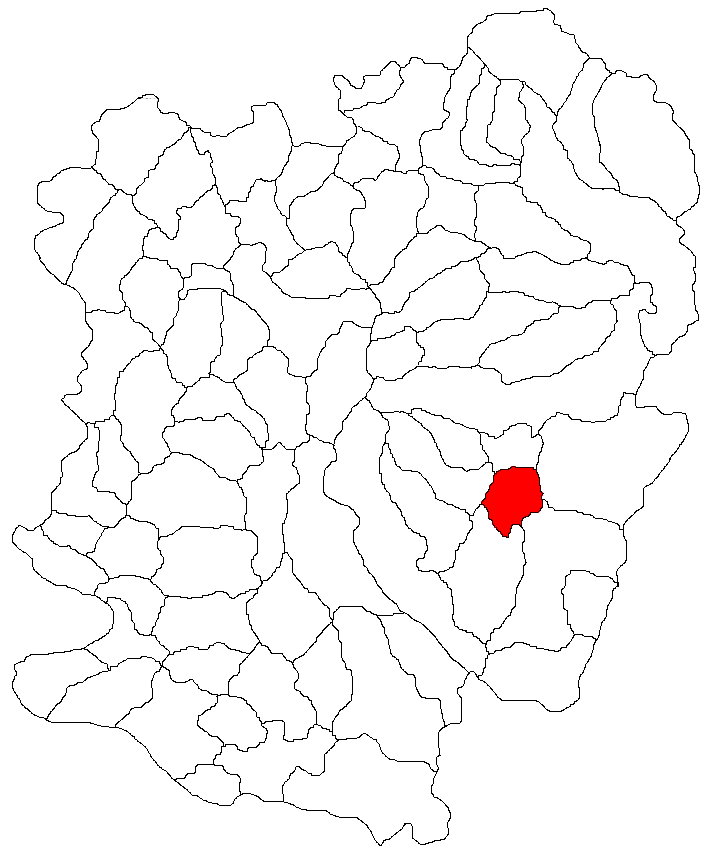
- Location in Caraș-Severin County

- Location in Romania
- Coordinates: 45°02′N 22°19′E
- Country: Romania
- County: Caraș-Severin

Government
  - Mayor (2024–2028): Pavel Martinescu (AUR)
- Area: 46.19 km^{2} (17.83 sq mi)
- Elevation: 347 m (1,138 ft)
- Population (2021-12-01): 1,556
  - Density: 33.69/km^{2} (87.25/sq mi)
- Time zone: UTC+02:00 (EET)
  - Summer (DST): UTC+03:00 (EEST)
- Postal code: 327105
- Area code: +(40) 02 55
- Vehicle reg.: CS
- Website: primaria-cornea.ro

Cornea (Hungarian: Somfa) is a commune in Caraș-Severin County, western Romania with a population of 1,556 people as of 2021. It is composed of four villages: Cornea, Crușovăț (Körtvélypatak), Cuptoare (Kuptorja), and Macoviște (Mákosfalva).

Historical population
| Year | Pop. | ±% |
|---|---|---|
| 1880 | 2,922 | — |
| 1910 | 3,181 | +8.9% |
| 1930 | 3,109 | −2.3% |
| 1977 | 2,744 | −11.7% |
| 2002 | 2,178 | −20.6% |
| 2011 | 1,890 | −13.2% |
| 2021 | 1,556 | −17.7% |
Source: Census data
