= Caraș-Severin County =

County of Romania

Caraș-Severin County Județul Caraș-Severin
- County
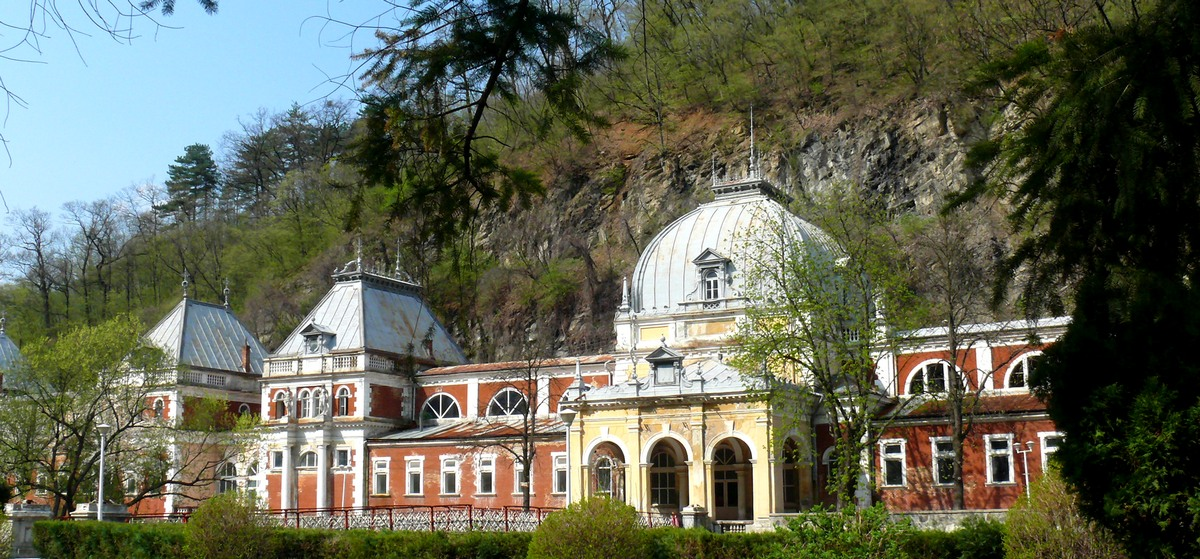
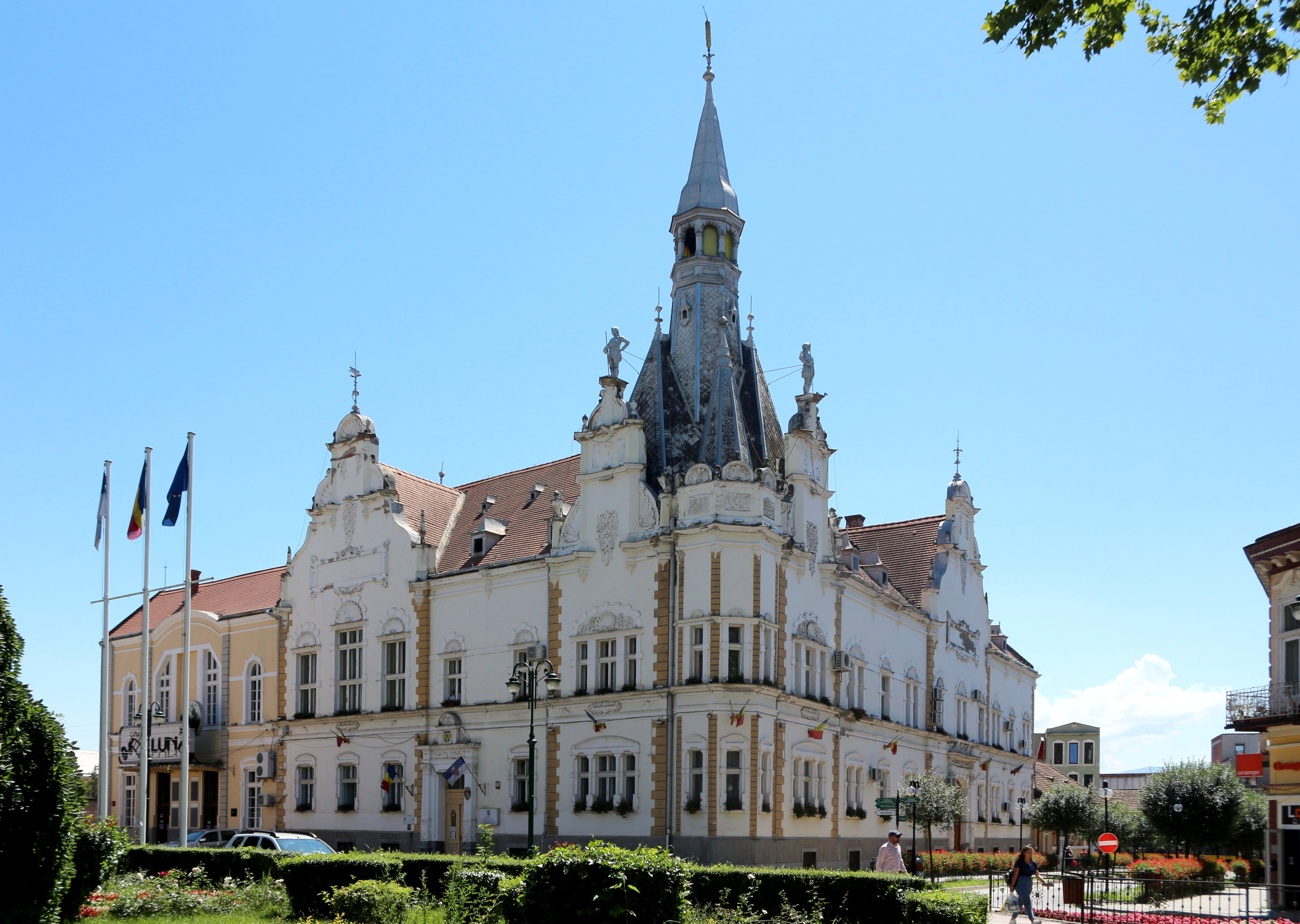
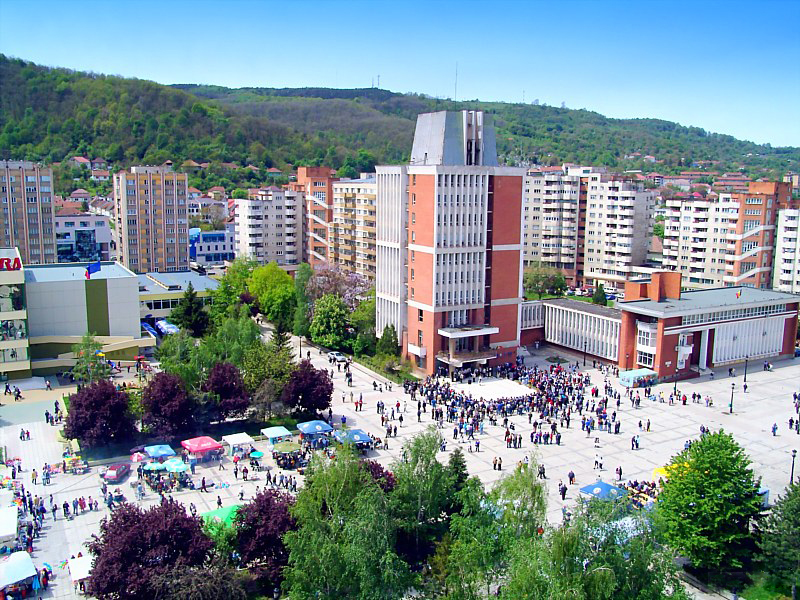
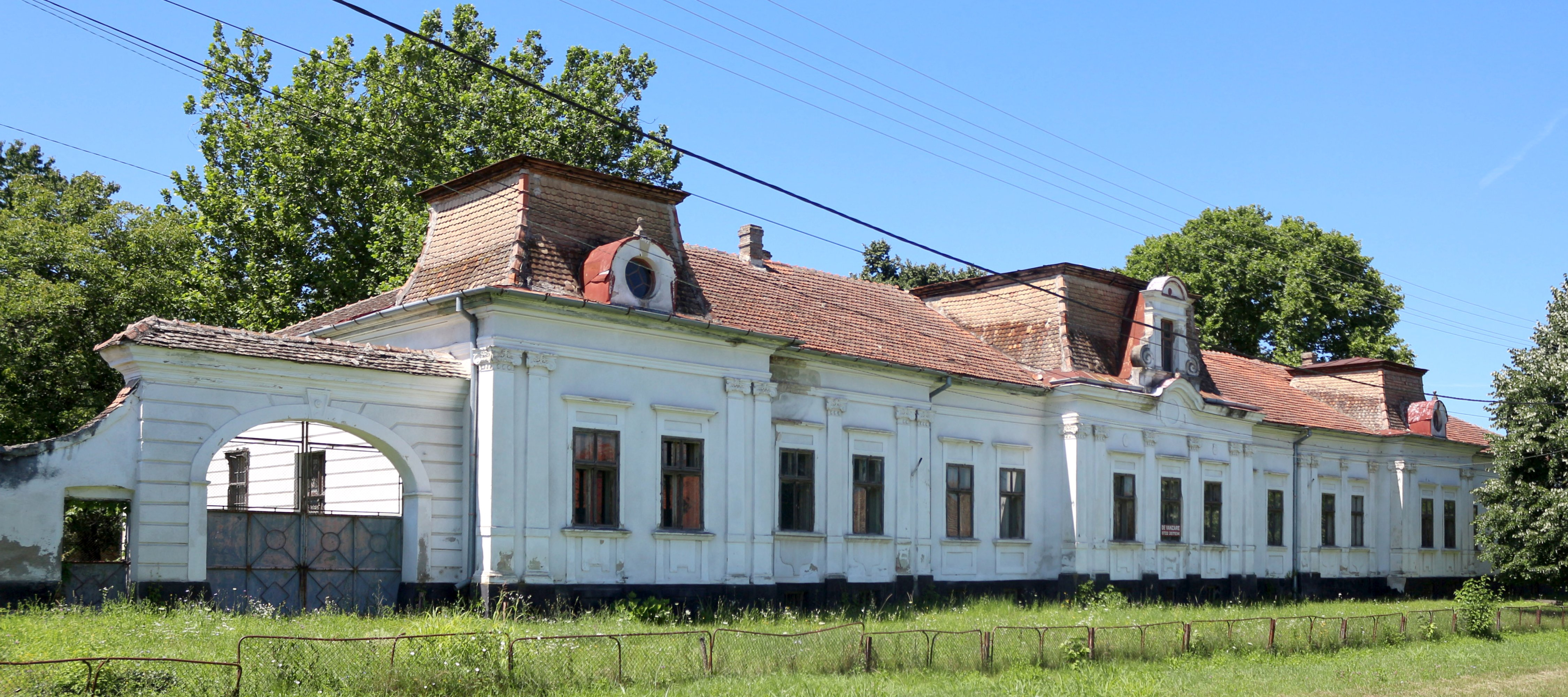
- Băile Herculane Caransebeș Reșița Juhász Mansion

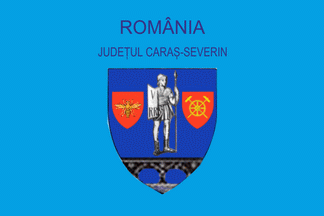
- Flag Coat of arms

- Caraș-Severin county, territorial location
- Coordinates: 45.15°N 22.07°E
- Country: Romania
- Development region^{1}: Vest
- Historic region: Banat
- Capital city (Reședință de județ): Reșița

Government
  - Type: County Council
  - President of the County Council: Silviu Hurduzeu (PSD)
  - Prefect^{2}: Ioan Dragomir

Area
  - Total: 8,514 km^{2} (3,287 sq mi)
  - Rank: 3rd in Romania

Population (2021-12-01)
  - Total: 246,588
  - Rank: 32nd in Romania
  - Density: 28.96/km^{2} (75.01/sq mi)
- Time zone: UTC+2 (EET)
  - Summer (DST): UTC+3 (EEST)
- Postal Code: 32wxyz^{3}
- Area code: +40 x55^{4}
- Car Plates: CS^{5}
- GDP: US$4.100 billion (2025)
- GDP per capita: US$16,626 (2025)
- Website: County Council; County Prefecture
- ^{1}The development regions of Romania have no administrative role. They were formed to correspond to NUTS-II level subdivisions of the European Union member states and are the basis for development funding under the cohesion and convergence objectives of the EU's regional policy^{2} as of 2007, the Prefect is not a politician, but a public functionary. He (or she) is not allowed to be a member of a political party, and is banned from any political activity in the first six months after resignation (or exclusion) from the public functionary corps^{3}w, x, y, and z are digits that indicate the city, the street, part of the street, or even the building of the address^{4}x is a digit indicating the operator: 2 for the former national operator, Romtelecom, and 3 for the other ground telephone networks^{5}used on both the plates of the vehicles that operate only in the county limits (like utility vehicles, ATVs, etc.), and the ones used outside the county

Caraș-Severin (Romanian pronunciation: [ˈkaraʃ seveˈrin]) is a county (județ) of Romania on the border with Serbia. The majority of its territory lies within the historical region of Banat, with a few northeastern villages considered part of Transylvania. The county seat is Reșița. The Caraș-Severin county is part of the Danube–Criș–Mureș–Tisa Euroregion.

== Name ==
In Croatian and Serbian, it is known as Karaš-Severin / Караш-Северин or Karaš-severinska županija, in Hungarian as Krassó-Szörény megye, in German as Kreis Karasch-Severin, and in Bulgarian as Караш-Северин (Karash-Severin).

== Geography ==

With 8,514 km^{2}, it is the third largest county in Romania, after Timiș and Suceava counties. It is also the county through which the river Danube enters Romania.

The mountains make up 67% of the county's surface, including the Southern Carpathians range, with Banat Mountains, Țarcu-Godeanu Mountains and Cernei Mountains and elevations between 600 and 2100 meters. Transition hills between mountains and the Banat Plain lie in the western side of the county.

The Danube enters Romania in the vicinity of Baziaș, bordering Serbia. Timiș, Cerna, Caraș and Nera cross the county, some of them through spectacular valleys and gorges.

=== Neighbours ===
- Hunedoara County and Gorj County to the east.
- Timiș County to the north.
- Mehedinți County to the southeast.
- Serbia to the southwest:
  - South Banat District to the west.
  - Braničevo District to the south.

== History and economy ==
In 1718 the county was part of the Habsburg monarchy, part of the province of Banat. In 1771 the county seat, Reschitz (Reșița) became a modern industrial center under Austrian rule. The area received considerable attention due to its mining industry. In 1855, the entire Banat area, with its supplies of mineral deposits and timber, was transferred from the Austrian Treasury to a joint Austrian-French mining and railroad company named StEG. StEG built the Oravița-Baziaș line, Romania's oldest railroad track.

After World War I, StEG, Banat and most Austro-Hungarian property were taken over by a company named UDR. During the last years of World War II, when Romania was an ally of Nazi Germany, a partisan group, led by Ștefan Plavăț, was active in the mountainous area of the county. The arrival of the communist regime in Romania after World War II and that regime's campaign of nationalization of the mining industry brought tremendous social upheaval in the area.

== Tourism ==
Archaeological findings show the area has been populated since Paleolithic times. There is a County Museum of History in Reșița, displaying archeological artifacts, and, in the town of Ocna de Fier, the Constantin Gruiescu Mineralogical Collection. The county hosts the regional daffodil and lilac festivals in the Spring. Sites worth visiting:

- Cheile Nerei – Beușnița National Park;
- Semenic – Cheile Carașului National Park;
- Domogled – Valea Cernei National Park;
- Danube Iron Gate National Park;
- Semenic resort;
- Băile Herculane resort;
- The Via Transilvanica long-distance hiking and biking trail, which crosses the county.

== Demographics ==
According to the 2021 census, the county had a population of 246,588 and the population density was 29.0/km^{2} (75.0/sq mi).

Ethnic composition of Caraș-Severin County (2021)
1. Romanians (91.2%)
2. Romani (2.48%)
3. Croats (2.13%)
4. Serbs (1.59%)
5. Ukrainians (0.70%)
6. Hungarians (0.66%)
7. Germans (Banat Swabians) (0.64%)
8. Czechs (0.42%)
9. Others (0.13%)

Year	County population
1948	302,254
1956	▲327,787
1966	▲358,726
1977	▲385,577
1992	▼375,794
2002	▼333,219
2011	▼274,277
2021	▼246,588

== Politics ==
- President of the County Council – Silviu Hurduzeu (Social Democratic Party)
- Vice-presidents of the County Council – Ioan Crina (Social Democratic Party) and Ovidiu Rădoi (National Liberal Party)

The Caraș-Severin County Council, renewed at the 2024 local elections, consists of 30 councilors, with the following party composition:

Party	Seats	Current County Council
Social Democratic Party (PSD)	14	
National Liberal Party (PNL)	12	
Alliance for the Union of Romanians (AUR)	4	

== Administrative divisions ==
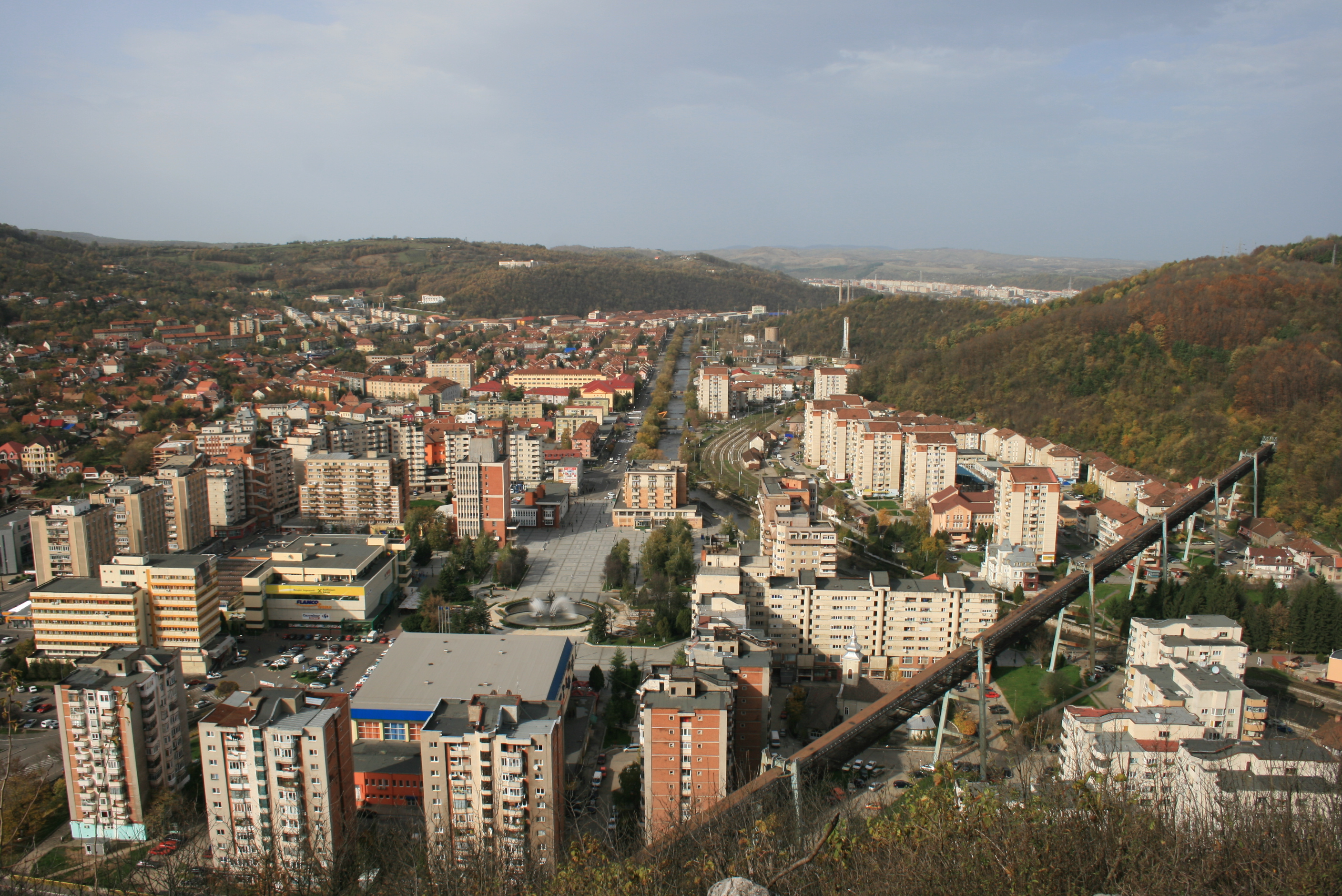
Reșița (German: Reschitz)

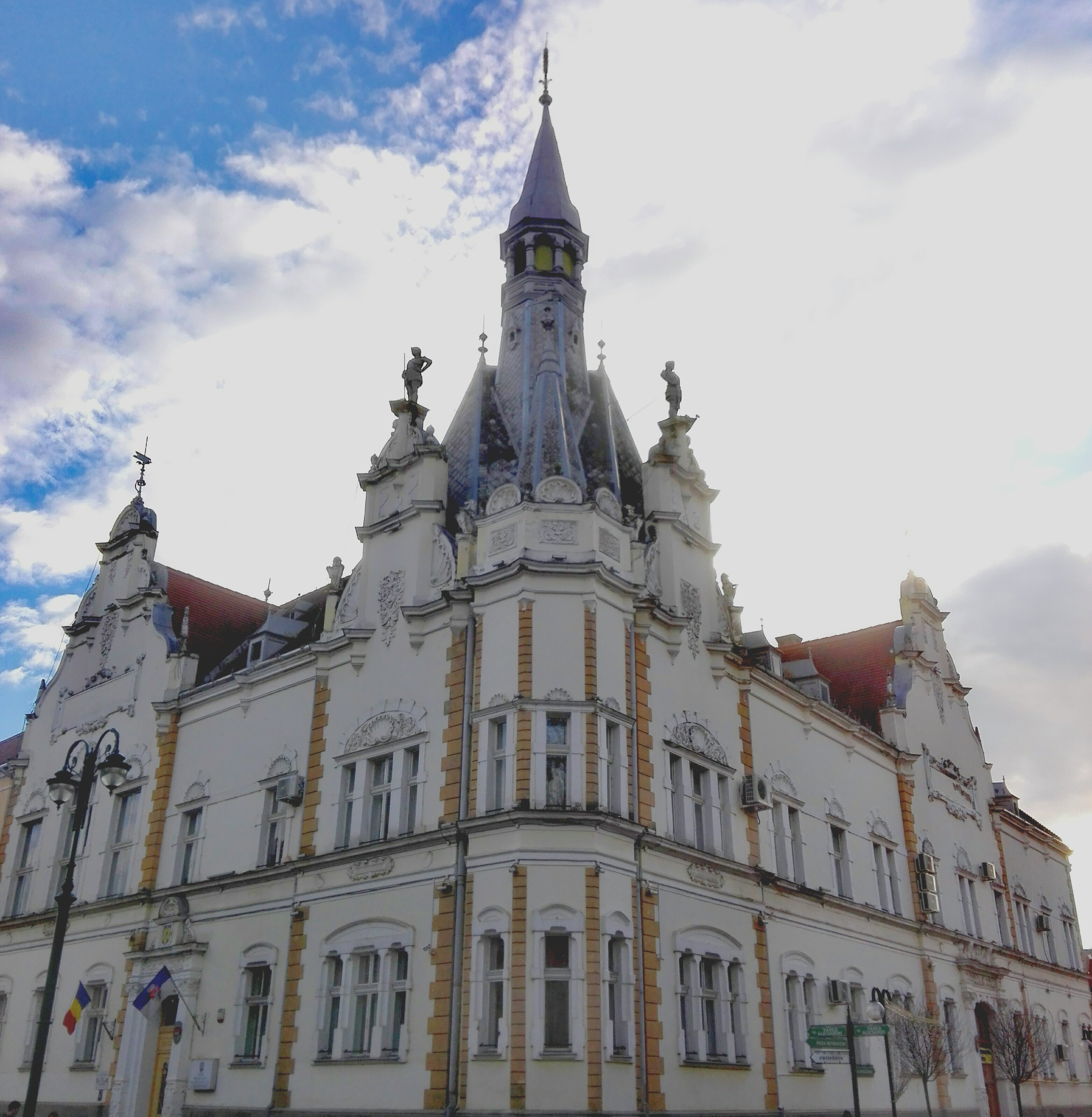
Caransebeș (German: Karansebesch)

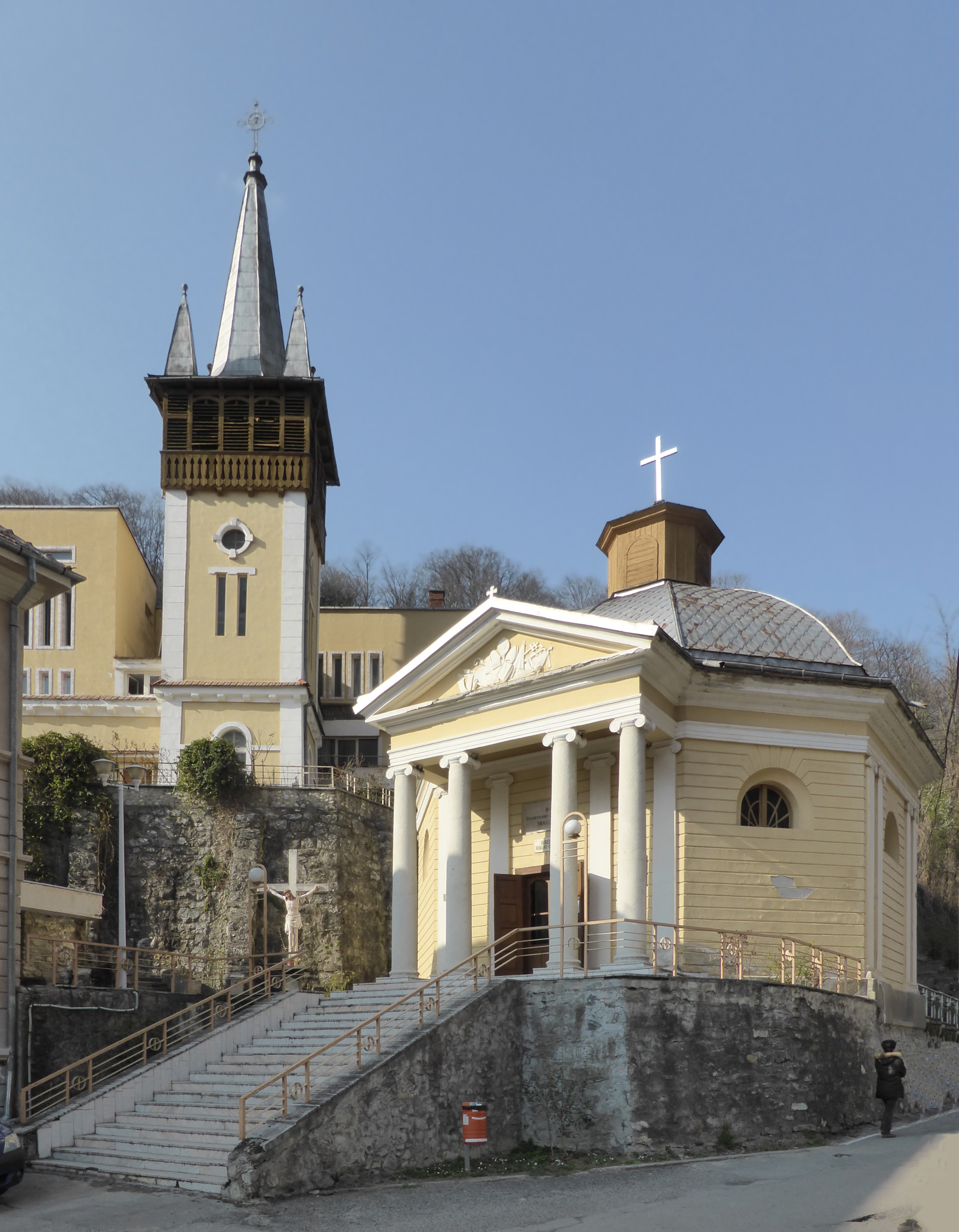
Băile Herculane (German: Herkulesbad)

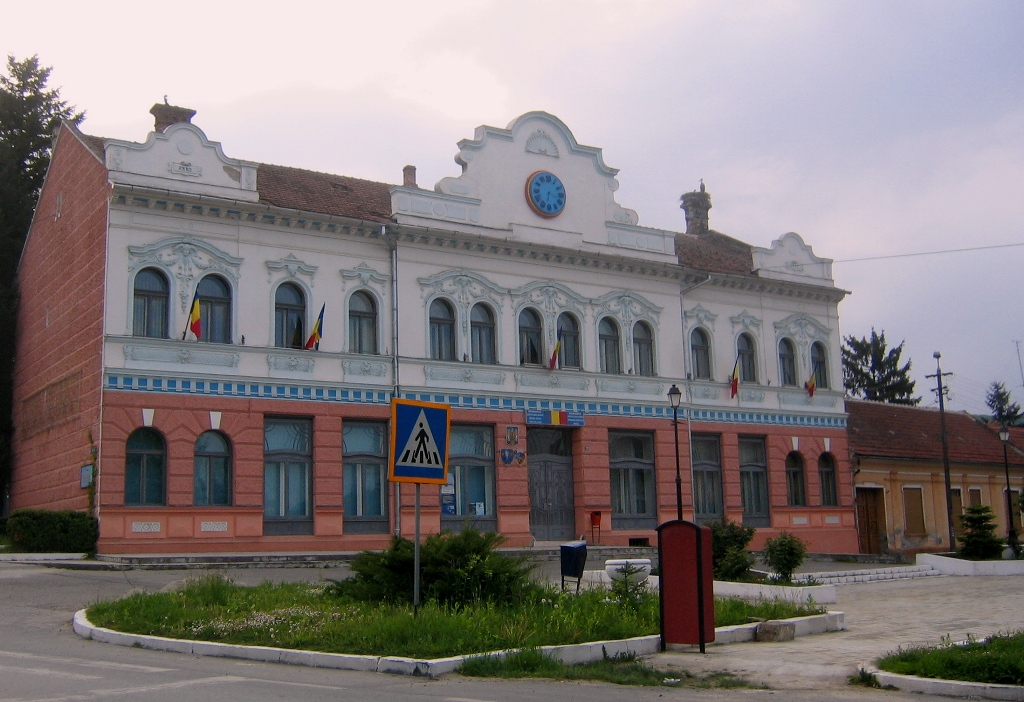
Bocșa (German: Deutsch-Bokschan/Neuwerk)

Caraș-Severin County has 2 municipalities, 6 towns, and 69 communes

- Municipalities
  - Caransebeș
  - Reșița – capital city; population: 58,393 (as of 2021)
- Towns
  - Anina
  - Băile Herculane
  - Bocșa
  - Moldova Nouă
  - Oravița
  - Oțelu Roșu
- Communes
  - Armeniș
  - Bănia
  - Băuțar
  - Berliște
  - Berzasca
  - Berzovia
  - Bolvașnița
  - Bozovici
  - Brebu
  - Brebu Nou
  - Buchin
  - Bucoșnița
  - Carașova
  - Cărbunari
  - Ciclova Română
  - Ciuchici
  - Ciudanovița
  - Constantin Daicoviciu
  - Copăcele
  - Cornea
  - Cornereva
  - Coronini
  - Dalboșeț
  - Doclin
  - Dognecea
  - Domașnea
  - Eftimie Murgu
  - Ezeriș
  - Fârliug
  - Forotic
  - Gârnic
  - Glimboca
  - Goruia
  - Grădinari
  - Iablanița
  - Lăpușnicel
  - Lăpușnicu Mare
  - Luncavița
  - Lupac
  - Marga
  - Măureni
  - Mehadia
  - Mehadica
  - Naidăș
  - Obreja
  - Ocna de Fier
  - Păltiniș
  - Pojejena
  - Prigor
  - Răcășdia
  - Ramna
  - Rusca Montană
  - Sacu
  - Sasca Montană
  - Sichevița
  - Slatina-Timiș
  - Socol
  - Șopotu Nou
  - Târnova
  - Teregova
  - Ticvaniu Mare
  - Topleț
  - Turnu Ruieni
  - Văliug
  - Vărădia
  - Vermeș
  - Vrani
  - Zăvoi
  - Zorlențu Mare

== Historical county ==
Județul Caraș-Severin
- County (Județ)
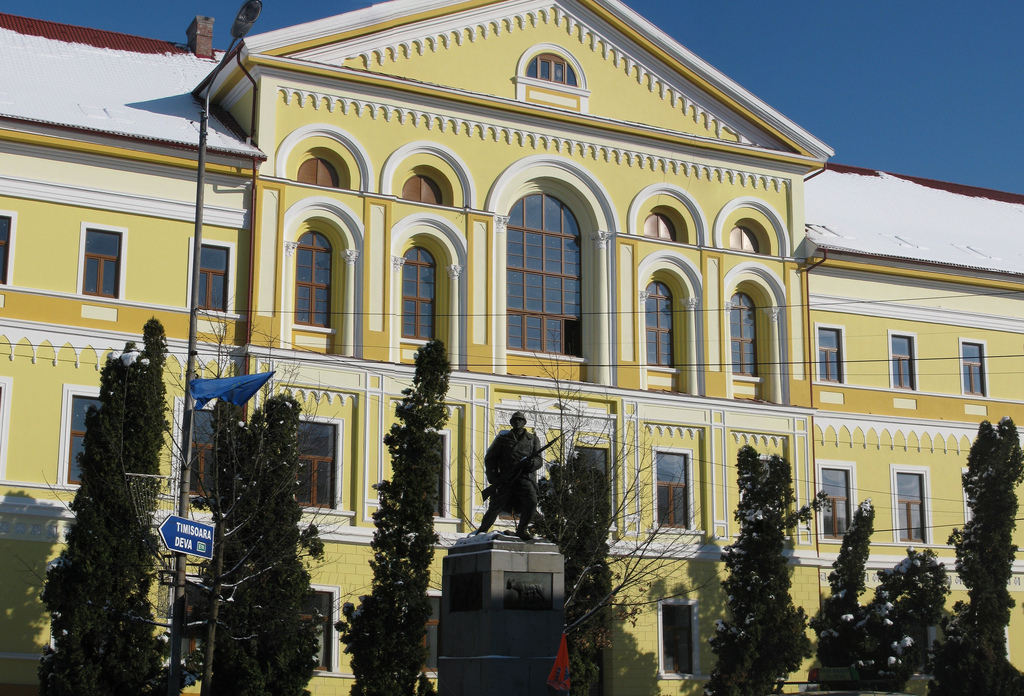
- The Caraș-Severin prefecture building from the interwar period.

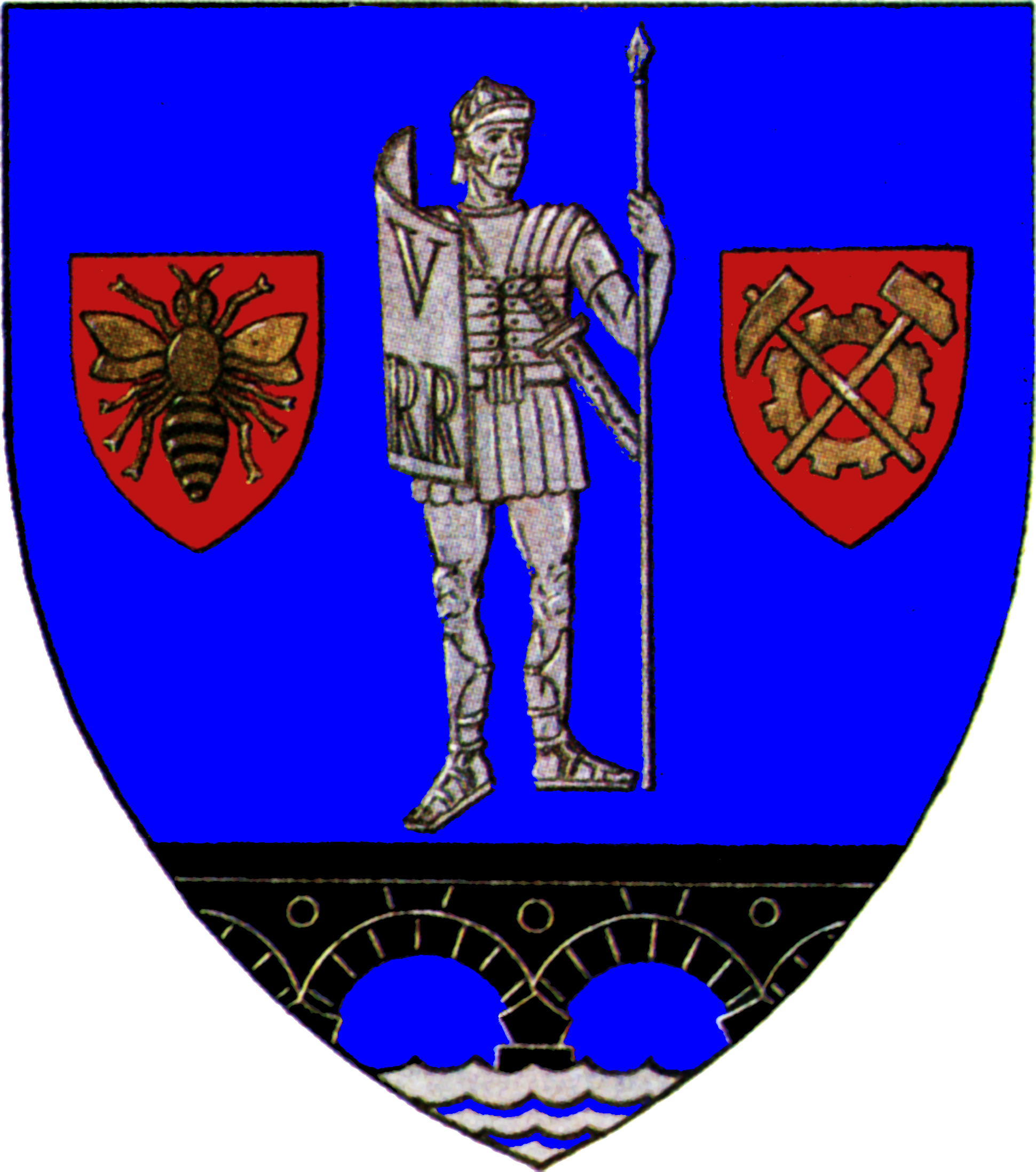
- Coat of arms

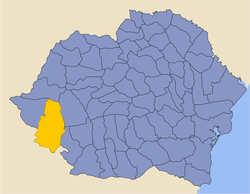
- Country: Romania
- Historic region: Banat
- Capital city (Reședință de județ): Lugoj
- Established: 1919
- Ceased to exist: 1926

Area
  - Total: 11,080 km^{2} (4,280 sq mi)

Population (1920)
  - Total: 424,254
  - Density: 38.29/km^{2} (99.17/sq mi)
- Time zone: UTC+2 (EET)
  - Summer (DST): UTC+3 (EEST)

The territory of the county was transferred to the Romania from the Kingdom of Hungary in 1920 under the Treaty of Trianon. The county was located in the southwestern part of Greater Romania, in the south and east region of the Banat. The county seat was Lugoj. Its territory consisted entirely of the current territory of the county, but also parts of the current counties of Timiș, Arad, and Mehedinți. It bordered on the west with Timiș-Torontal County and the Kingdom of Yugoslavia, to the south with Yugoslavia, to the east with the counties Mehedinți and Hunedoara, and to the north by Arad County. The county had a total area over 11,000 square kilometres (4,200 sq mi), making it the largest county geographically of interwar Romania. Its territory corresponded to the former Hungarian division of Krassó-Szörény County. The county existed for seven years, being divided in 1926 into Caraș County and Severin County.

=== Administration ===
The county was divided administratively into fourteen districts (plăși). There were five urban municipalities (cities): Lugoj (capital), Caransebeș, Reșița, Oravița and Orșova.

=== Population ===
According to the census data of 1920, the total population of the county was 424,254 inhabitants. The population density was 38 inhabitants/km^{2}.
