= Căile Ferate Române Line 100 =

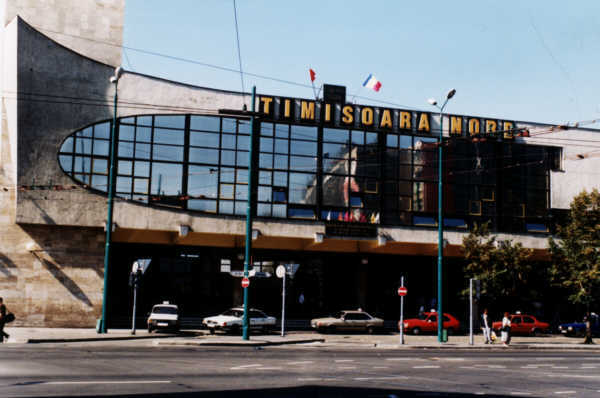
- Timișoara Nord railway station

Overview
- Owner: Romanian State
- Locale: Caraș-Severin, Dâmbovița, Dolj, Olt, Mehedinți, Teleorman, Timiș
- Stations: 57

Service
- Operator: Căile Ferate Române

Technical
- Track gauge: 1,435 mm (4 ft 8 1/2 in) standard gauge
Route map

Line 100 (numbered 900 until 2021) is one of CFR's main lines in Romania, having a total length of about 533 km (331 mi). The main line, connecting Bucharest with the western city of Timișoara, passes through the important cities of Craiova, Drobeta-Turnu Severin and Lugoj.

There are five pairs of direct trains that run daily on the Bucharest North–Timișoara route; four of those trains belong to the state railway operator CFR Călători and one to the private operator Astra Trans Carpatic. The journey takes approximately 10 hours.

== History ==
=== Line 100: Timișoara–Orșova ===
The construction of the line between Temesvár and Orsova was proposed by Imre Mikó, along with 24 other railways in Hungary. The treaty between Hungary and Romania, signed in May 1874, obliged Romania to connect the railway at Verciorova to the Austrian State Railway Company (StEG) line. In the same year, the StEG obtained a concession to build a line Temesvár–Orsova. On 23 October 1876, the section from Temesvár to Karansebe was first opened. The line of StEG was extended to Orsova on 20 May 1878. In the Hungarian section of Austria-Hungary, StEG was absorbed into the Hungarian State Railways (MÁV) in 1891. The section from Temesvár to the border was also transferred to the network of MÁV lines.

Following the Treaty of Trianon the section of the former MÁV was placed under the administration of Romanian State Railways (CFR) and the border has since disappeared.

== Secondary lines ==
Line	Terminal stations		Intermediate stops	Length (km)
101	Bucharest North	Craiova	Titu – Pitești – Costești – Slatina – Piatra Olt – Balș	250
102	Bucharest Progresu	Giurgiu		61
103	Videle	Giurgiu		66
104	Titu	Pietroșița	Târgoviște	67
105	Golești	Câmpulung		55
106	Pitești	Curtea de Argeș		38
107	Roșiori North	Costești		64
108	Roșiori North	Turnu Măgurele		50
109	Roșiori North	Zimnicea	Alexandria	78
110	Piatra Olt	Corabia	Caracal	74
112	Craiova	Calafat		108
113	Golenți	Poiana Mare		7
114	Strehaia	Motru		31
115	Caransebeș	Reșița South		43
116	Lugoj	Jamu Mare	Buziaș – Gătaia	84
117	Caransebeș	Băuțar		37
118	Timișoara North	Buziaș		
119	Timișoara North	Jimbolia to Kikinda (Serbia)		58
120	Jebel	Liebling		10
121	Jebel	Giera		33
122	Timișoara North	Reșița South	Jebel – Voiteg – Gătaia – Berzovia	98
123	Berzovia	Oravița		59
124	Oravița	Iam		27
125	Oravița	Anina		33
126	Timișoara North	Cruceni		49
127	Cărpiniș	Otelec		31
128	Jimbolia	Lovrin		27
