= Livezile, Timiș =

Livezile
- Commune
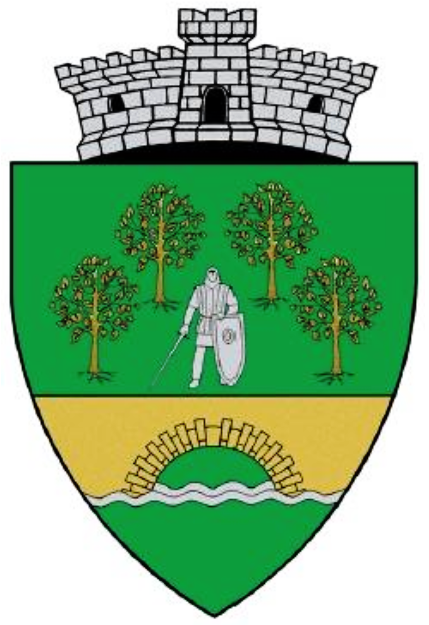
- Coat of arms

- Location in Timiș County

- Location in Romania
- Coordinates: 45°23′N 21°03′E
- Country: Romania
- County: Timiș

Government
  - Mayor (2024–): Daniel Lungu (PSD)
- Area: 55.8 km^{2} (21.5 sq mi)
- Population (2021-12-01): 1,374
  - Density: 24.6/km^{2} (63.8/sq mi)
- Time zone: EET/EEST (UTC+2/+3)
- Postal code: 307011–307012
- Vehicle reg.: TM
- Website: www.comunalivezile.ro

Livezile (literally "orchards"; until 1968 Tolvădia; Hungarian: Tolvád; German: Tollwad; Serbian: Толвадија, romanized: Tolvadija) is a commune in Timiș County, Romania. It is composed of two villages, Dolaț and Livezile (commune seat). From 1972 to 2006, its villages were part of Banloc commune.

== Geography ==
Livezile is located in the southwestern part of Timiș County, along the border with Serbia, in the Timiș Plain. The Timiș Plain is a recent plain, mostly a floodplain, drained by Bega and Timiș rivers with their tributaries and arms. Until its draining and damming, the plain was almost entirely a swamp.

It borders Banloc to the east and Giera to the west. To the north, the commune's border is located on the Lanca Birda, a left tributary of the Timiș River, which separates it from Ghilad. To the south, the commune's border is located on the Bârzava River, of which a stretch of 3.8 km (2.4 mi) marks Romania's border with Serbia. Between these limits, the commune has an area of 55.8 km^{2} (21.5 sq mi).

=== Climate ===
Due to its geographical location, Livezile's climate is temperate continental with a pronounced forest-steppe character, with relatively mild winters and long springs and autumns. The average annual temperature is 10.9 °C (51.6 °F). The distribution of rainfall during the year is quite irregular, with minimal monthly rainfall in October and November. The wind regime is varied. From autumn to spring, under the influence of the Siberian High, cold north winds blow, and during the summer dry south winds. Heavy rains come from the west, and hail from the east and northeast.

== History ==
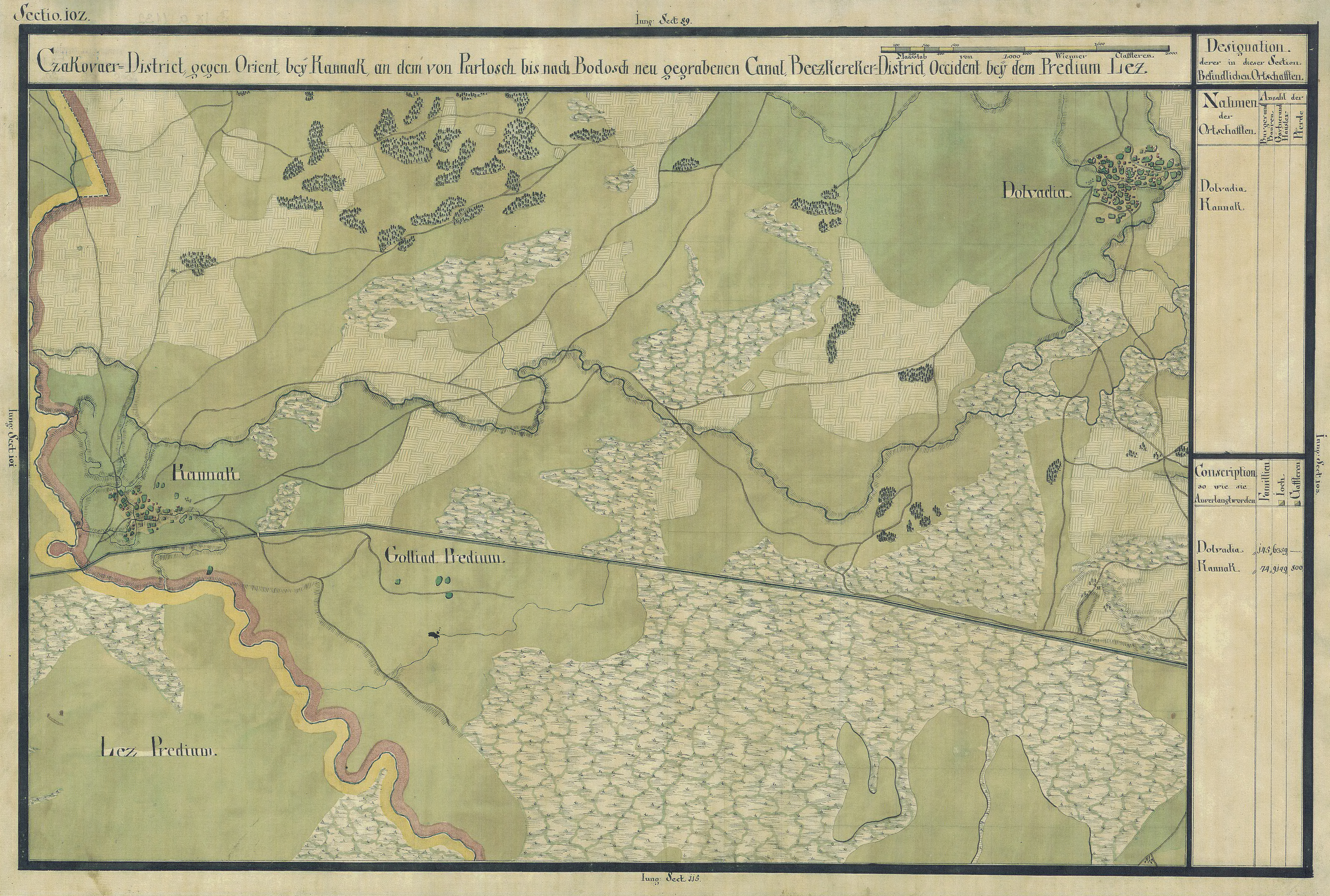
Livezile (Dolvadia) in the Josephinische Landesaufnahme of 1769–1772

The first recorded mention of Livezile dates from 1332. The old name of the village is Tolvădia, derived from the German Tolwad. In the Middle Ages it belonged to Temes County, and around 1462 it was the property of Bergsoy Hagymás of Berecks (Beregsău). The settlement persisted as an inhabited locality throughout the period of Turkish occupation. In the 17th century, the village was situated not in its present location but within the vicinity of the Jark vineyard. During this period, the village was referred to as Tolvadja or Tolvadin. The 1717 treasury census recorded the village as an inhabited settlement, comprising 30 occupied households. However, the village was destroyed shortly thereafter. In the 1723/1725 map created by Count Mercy, the settlement is depicted as uninhabited under the name Tollwacz. It is likely that during this period the village relocated to its current site. The Gyertyánffy family, proprietors of the village, acquired the estate during the reign of Joseph II, known as the "Hatted King" (1780–1790). It was during this period that the family also commissioned the construction of a mansion within the settlement. Ecclesiastically, Tolvădia was a branch of the Catholic parish of Ofsenița in the 19th century.

Between 1918–1922, Tolvădia belonged to Plasa Modoș, between 1922–1958 to Plasa Ciacova, then it was part of Deta District, until 1968. After the administrative-territorial reform of 1968, Tolvădia was renamed Livezile and, together with Dolaț, incorporated into the commune of Banloc. In 2006 the commune of Livezile was re-established on Law no. 461/2006, splitting off from the commune of Banloc.

== Demographics ==
Ethnic composition (2021)
1. Romanians (86.9%)
2. Unknown (11.9%)
3. Others (1.25%)
Religious composition (2021)
1. Orthodox (77.3%)
2. Roman Catholics (6.62%)
3. Pentecostals (1.60%)
4. Unknown (12.8%)
5. Others (1.69%)

Livezile had a population of 1,374 inhabitants at the 2021 census, down 12.26% from the 2011 census. Most inhabitants are Romanians (86.89%). For 11.86% of the population, ethnicity is unknown. By religion, most inhabitants are Orthodox (77.29%), but there are also minorities of Roman Catholics (6.62%) and Pentecostals (1.6%). For 12.8% of the population, religious affiliation is unknown.

Census		Ethnic composition
Year	Population	Romanians	Hungarians	Germans	Serbs
1880	2,792	792	111	1,586	295
1890	3,142	854	148	1,880	251
1900	3,091	858	86	1,845	302
1910	3,148	1,007	298	1,534	291
1920	3,130	951	212	1,708	–
1930	3,357	1,144	221	1,682	285
1941	3,288	1,206	213	1,590	–
1956	2,711	–	–	–	–
1966	2,546	1,104	221	1,025	188
1977	2,138	1,082	160	703	130
1992	1,656	1,329	119	103	65
2002	1,628	1,412	117	51	37
2011	1,566	1,382	61	40	23
2021	1,374	1,194	7	–	3

== Politics and administration ==
The commune of Livezile is administered by a mayor and a local council composed of 11 councilors. The mayor, Daniel Lungu, from the Social Democratic Party, has been in office since 2024. As from the 2024 local elections, the local council has the following composition by political parties:

Party	Seats	Composition
Social Democratic Party	5	
National Liberal Party	4	
Alliance for the Union of Romanians	2	
