= Regio Călători =

Romanian rail company

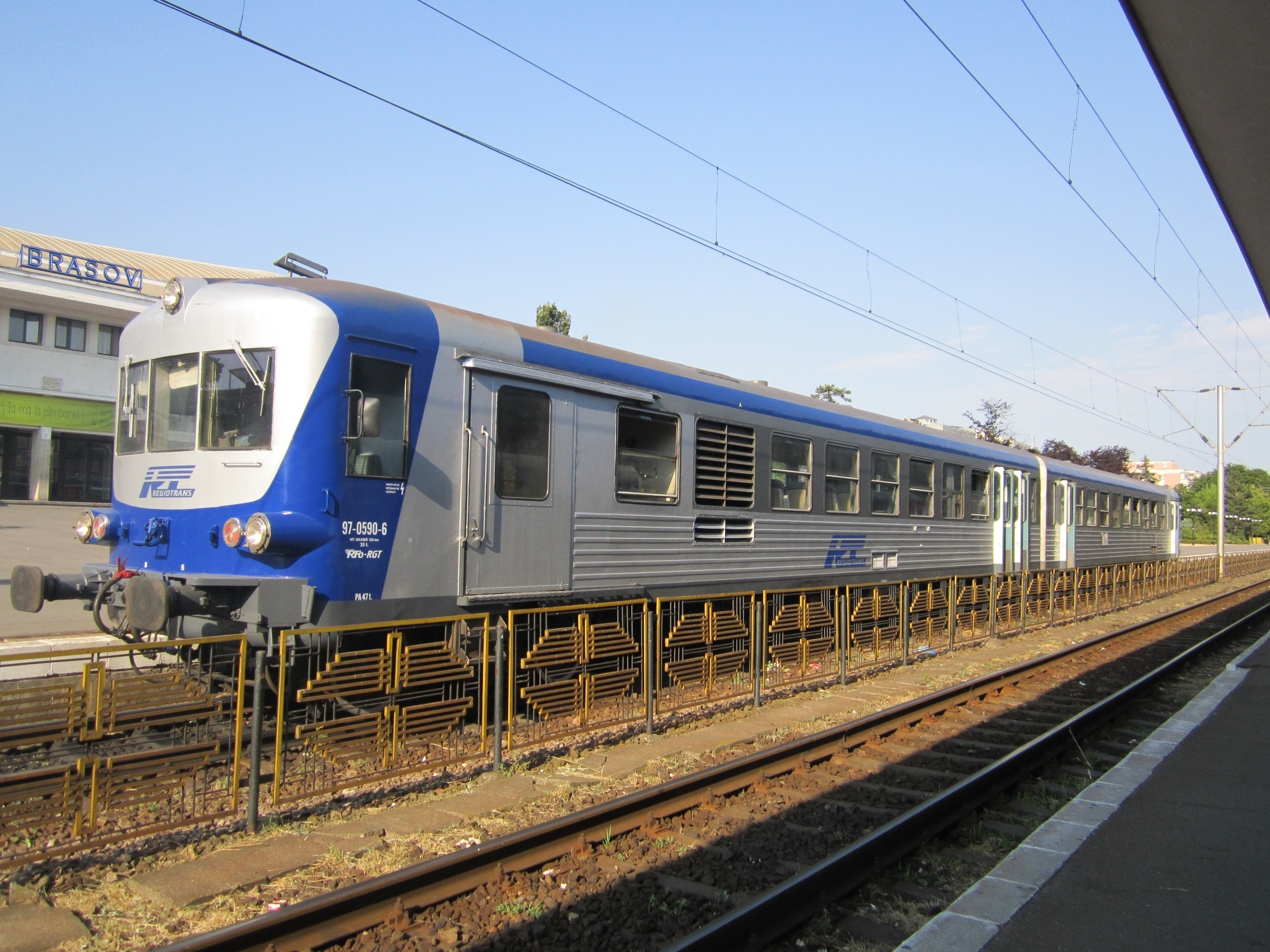
- A Regiotrans diesel unit in Brașov station

Overview
- Main region: Romania
- Headquarters: Brașov
- Dates of operation: 2005–present

Other
- Website: regiocalatori.ro

Regio Călători, formerly Regiotrans and Feroviar Keolis, is a private rail company headquartered in Brașov, Romania.

== History ==
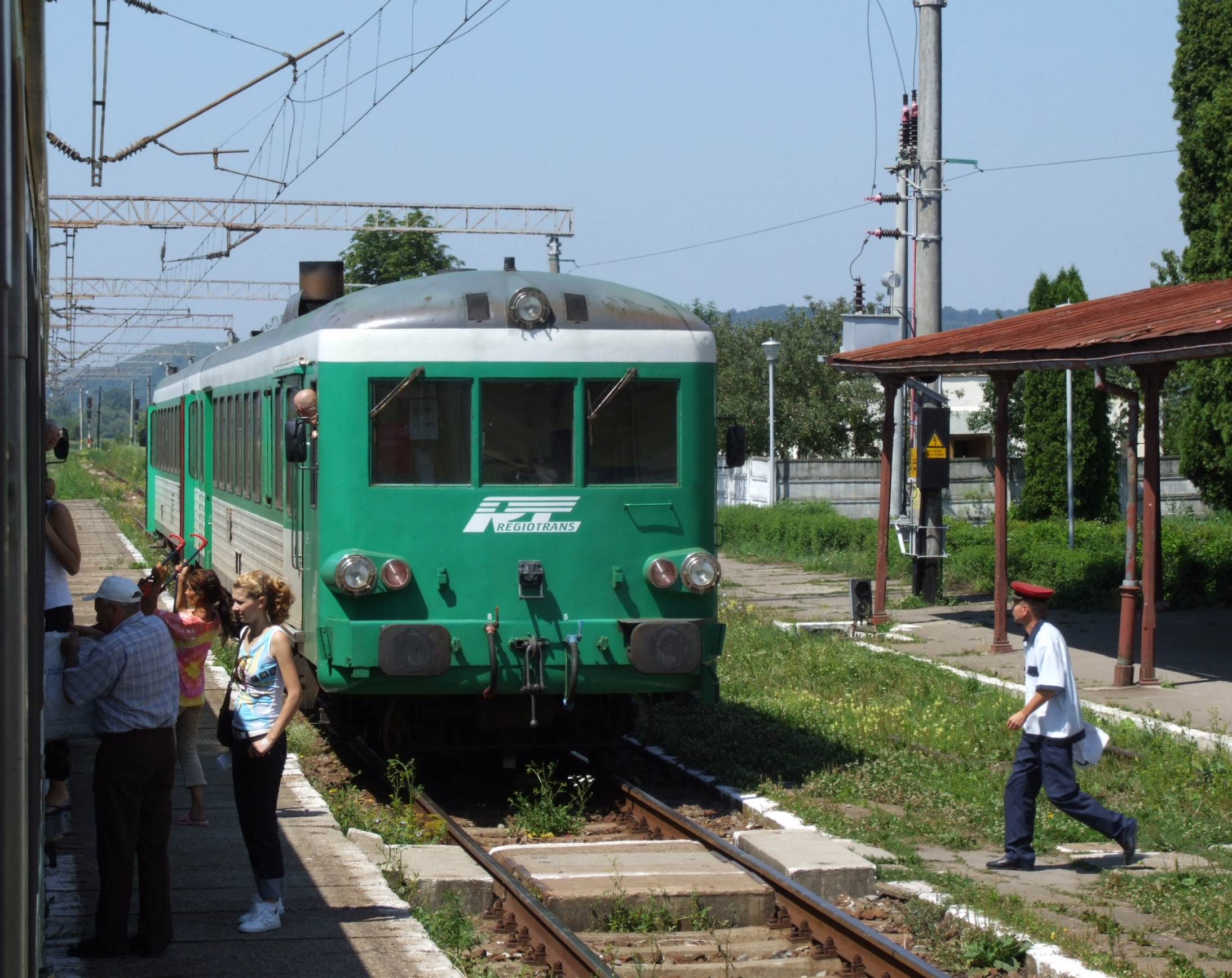
A Regiotrans diesel unit in Dumbrăveni

It was founded in 2005 and is exclusively active in the passenger transport sector. At present Regiotrans runs about 200 train services per day.

It originally operated as Feroviar Keolis, being rebranded Regiotrans after Keolis made a trademark claim.

On 17 March 2015, the Romanian Rail Safety Authority revoked the company's Part B safety certificate and the company ceased operations on all routes until further notice. Căile Ferate Române (CFR), the national rail carrier has taken over (from March 18, 2015, for the time being) some of the routes; but not all, and those that CFR had taken on operated with a skeleton service. The sudden cessation of Regiotrans services, with virtually no notice, took many travellers by surprise; some passengers being stranded in fields. Their Regiotrans season tickets were honoured by CFR, but clearly only if CFR were providing an emergency replacement. A refund, however, was available for longer period season ticket holders.

Particularly in the Banat region, there were no alternative bus routes. Many villages and even substantial towns, therefore, had no practical public transport option. Services restarted on certain routes on 1 April 2015, the company apparently having obtained the safety certificates following a fast track procedure ("în regim de urgență"). Further re-openings were effected in mid/late April 2015 (for example Ineu–Cermei), several routes, however, remain closed, following changes in the subsidy allocations and calculation' regulations, that occurred in March 2015.

The company had been experiencing difficulties due to alleged subsidy corruption. Not the least problem faced by its major shareholders and directors was that a majority shareholder and joint senior executive, Costel Comana after taking drugs, committed suicide by hanging himself with his shoelaces in a toilet aboard a flight between Colombia and Costa Rica. Comana had fled Romania for Brazil after the arrest of his co-chief executive (and joint owner of Regioalatori), Iorgu Ganea. Ganea had been arrested and faced prosecution regarding subsidy irregularities.

== Routes ==
Regiotrans primarily runs local trains. Many of the services (especially in the Banat) are very infrequent, with the service between Liebling and Jebel running just once a week until its withdrawal on 1 April 2015. Indeed, a number of services appear to have been withdrawn from this date. Others lines have had their services drastically reduced: for example between Praid and Bălăușeri (on the line Praid–Blaj) there is now only one train per day in each direction which makes a round trip from Praid for any purpose impossible.

Rolling stock is mainly former SNCF Class X 4500 diesel multiple units and for long routes RIO/RIB multiple units with SNCF Class BB 25500 push pull electric locomotives.

It is the only operator on several routes:

- Brașov–Zărnești
- Brașov–Întorsura Buzăului
- Sfântu Gheorghe–Brețcu
- Blaj–Praid
- Alba Iulia–Zlatna
- Bistrița Nord–Sărățel-Luduș
- Timișoara Nord–Cruceni
- Timișoara Nord–Voiteni–Reșița Nord
- Lovrin–Cenad
- Lovrin–Nerău
- Arad–Nădlac
- Arad–Sânnicolau Mare–Vălcani
- Ineu–Cermei
- Iași–Podu Iloaiei–Hârlău
- Iași–Lețcani–Dângeni–Dorohoi
- Roman–Buhăiești–Iași
- Golești–Câmpulung Muscel - Argeșel

On other routes it operates alongside the public railway company CFR (usually with lower frequencies):

- Brașov–Alba Iulia
- Sibiu–Copșa Mică - Sighişoara
- Alba Iulia–Cluj-Napoca (never operated)
- Arad–Ineu–Brad (only section Arad to Sântana is shared with CFR)

Regiotrans also have a few long distance trains:

- Brașov–București Nord
- Brașov–Constanța seasonal
- Brașov–Iași

Occasionally Regiotrans operated a tourist steam train, named Dracula Express, between Brașov–Zărnești and Brașov–Întorsura Buzăului.

== Rolling stock ==
All trains in Regio Călători's fleet are second-hand from other operators. This is set to change with the delivery of new trains from Pesa.

=== Diesel Trains ===
Type	Carriages	Image
628 (ex Deutsche Bahn)	2	
X 4500 (ex SNCF)	2	
X 4300 (ex SNCF)	2	
X 72500 (ex SNCF)	2 or 3	

=== Electric trains ===
Type	Carriages	Image
2000 (ex CFL)	2	
BB25500 (ex SNCF)		

=== Coaching stock ===
Type	Image
RIO (ex SNCF)	
RIB (ex SNCF)	
