= Folea =

- Location within Romania

Location
- Country: Romania
- Counties: Timiș County
- Villages: Șipet, Folea

Physical characteristics
- Mouth: Lanca Birda
  - coordinates: 45.5226°N 21.2339°E
- Length: 27 km (17 mi)
- Basin size: 94 km^{2} (36 sq mi)

Basin features
- Progression: Lanca Birda→ Timiș→ Danube→ Black Sea
- Tributaries
  - left: Begu

The Folea is a left tributary of the river Lanca Birda in Romania. It flows into the Lanca Birda near Jebel. Its length is 27 km (17 mi) and its basin size is 94 km^{2} (36 sq mi).
