= Vâna Mare =

Vâna Mare may refer to the following rivers in Romania:

- Vâna Mare, a tributary of the Cernat in Buzău County
- Vâna Mare (Lanca Birda), in Timiș County
- Vâna Mare (Timiș), in Caraș-Severin and Timiș Counties
