= Vâna Mare (Lanca Birda) =

- Location within Romania

Location
- Country: Romania
- Counties: Timiș County
- Villages: Iosif

Physical characteristics
- Mouth: Lanca Birda
  - coordinates: 45.5351°N 21.2426°E
- Length: 17 km (11 mi)

Basin features
- Progression: Lanca Birda→ Timiș→ Danube→ Black Sea

The Vâna Mare is a right tributary of the river Lanca Birda in Romania. It flows into the Lanca Birda near Jebel. Its length is 17 km (11 mi) and its basin size is 74 km^{2} (29 sq mi).
