= Lanca Birda =

- Location within Romania

Location
- Country: Romania
- Counties: Timiș County
- Villages: Cerna, Liebling, Iosif, Jebel, Ghilad

Physical characteristics
- Mouth: Timiș
  - location: Gad
  - coordinates: 45.4739°N 20.9824°E
- Length: 53 km (33 mi)
- Basin size: 416 km^{2} (161 sq mi)

Basin features
- Progression: Timiș→ Danube→ Black Sea
- Tributaries
  - left: Baloanea, Folea, Voiteg
  - right: Vâna Mare

The Lanca Birda is a left tributary of the river Timiș in Romania. It discharges into the Timiș in Gad. Its length is 53 km (33 mi) and its basin size is 416 km^{2} (161 sq mi). The river was canalized downstream of Ghilad and at present plays the role of drainage canal of the lowlands on the left bank of the Timiș.
