= Dimitrije Tirol =

Serb linguist and geographer

Dmitrije Tirol
- Димитрије П. Тирол
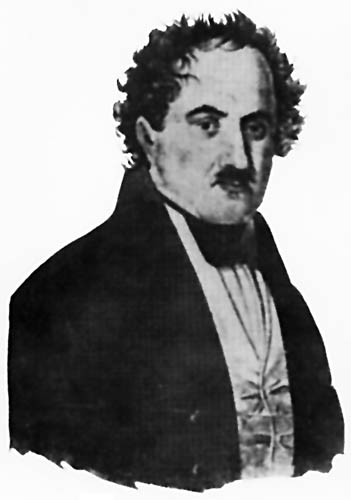
- Born: 30 May 1793; Csák, Habsburg monarchy
- Died: 30 March 1857 (aged 63); Timișoara, Austrian Empire

Dimitrije P. Tirol (Serbian: Димитрије П. Тирол; 30 May 1793 – 30 March 1857) was a Serb writer, linguist, geographer and painter.

== Biography ==
Dimitrije P. Tirol was born in Csák, Habsburg monarchy (now Ciacova, Romania), the son of Panta Tirol and Magdalina Kapamadžija. His father was born Georgijević, but on the wall of the house it read "Tyrol", so he took this as his name.

Dimitrije completed his schooling in Csák, Brist, Timișoara and Kecskemét. He graduated from high school in Mezőberény, then enrolled in the Evangelical Lyceum in Bratislava. He returned home in 1813, and two years later his father died. He then moved to Timișoara with his mother, where he learned to trade at his father's request.

In 1817 he married Christina Christophorov.

He was a great admirer of Vuk Karadžić at the time of the language reforms. It was because of Vuk that he began collecting Serbian national folk songs in the region of Banat. It was at the time he began writing several scholastic textbooks, including a German Grammar for Serbian youth. In 1818, he wrote Privestvovatelnaja knizica za primilu i preljubeznu serbsku junost.

Vuk and his family visited Tirol in Timișoara several times. In 1822 Karadžić translated Tirol's grammar into German. Also, Tirol prepared a Serbian grammar that Vuk Karadžić included in the Srpski rječnik for Jacob Grimm who published his Wuk's Stephanowitsch kleine Serbische Grammatik in 1824.

In 1827 he published his Slavenska gramatika, sad prvi red na srpskom jeziku (Volume 1). In 1828, Dimitrije P. Tirol founded the Serbian Literary Society of Timişoara with Pavel Kengelac and Đorđe Čokrljan. However, three years later, the institution was banned by the authorities. In 1830, he and his wife moved to Belgrade to get away from Habsburg's oppression. He worked a lot there. The Ministry of Education was pleased with Tirol's educational plan and assigned Dimitrije Isailović, Chief Inspector of all schools in Serbia, and Dimitrije Tirol, member of the State Department for History and Geography. He wrote and published Političesko zemljopisanie in Belgrade in 1832.

In 1839, Dimitrije, as Miloš's teacher (son of Prince Jevrem Obrenović, was sent to Imperial Russia. In Odessa, Tirol met Serbs who had left the Habsburg Empire in the early and mid-18th century. He met several people there and collected historical material. Dimitrije and Miloš returned to Serbia some two years later.

On 1 May 1848, he became a member of the May Assembly in Sremski Karlovci.

Dimitrije P. Tirol was also an excellent painter, mainly portraits. He is best remembered for painting the likeness of Dositej Obradović.

In 1851 he taught Serbian at the Grammar School in Timișoara, but in the same year, he also became headmaster of a Serbian school. He died in Timișoara.
