= Voiteg =

- Commune
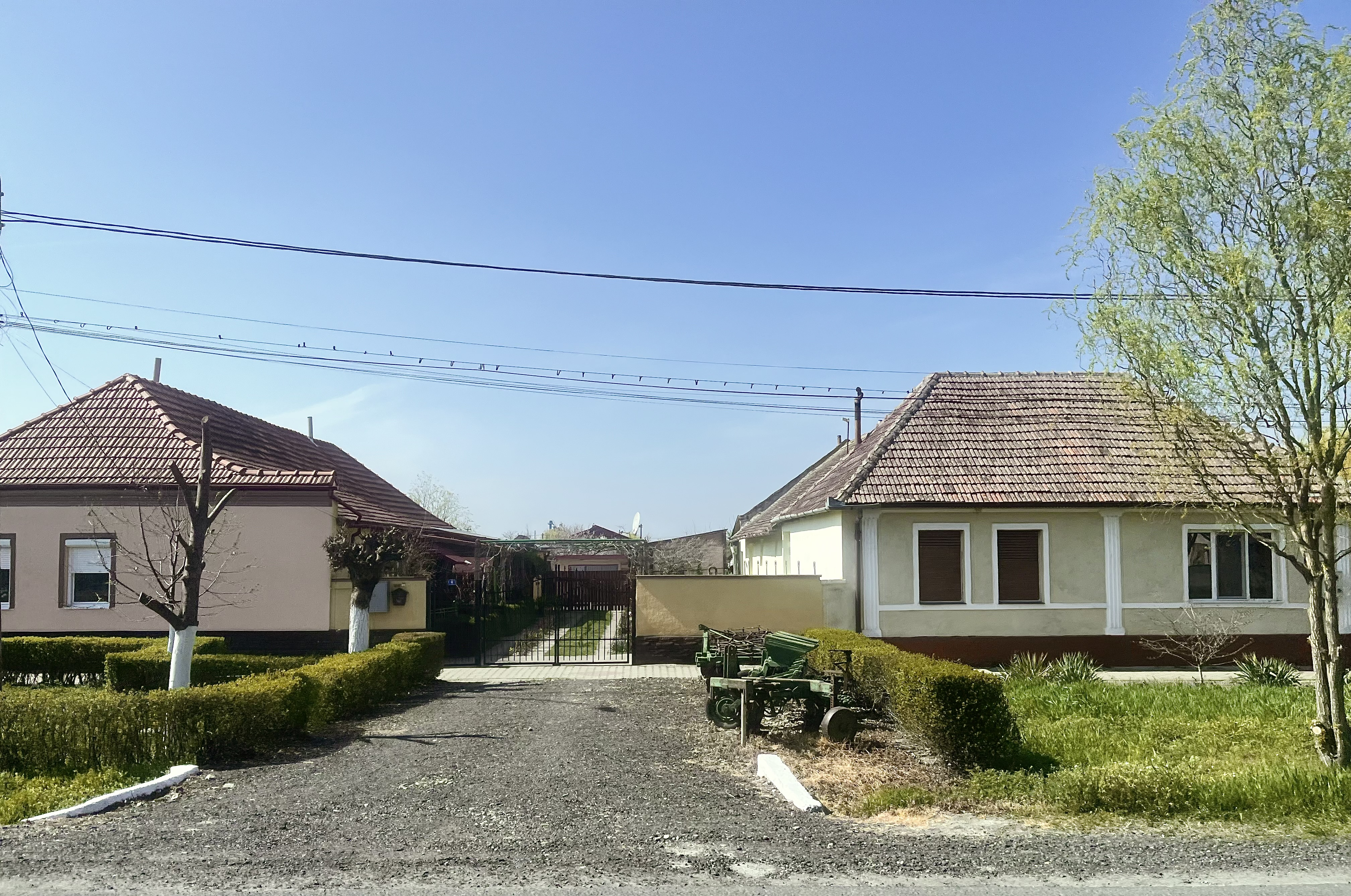

- Location in Timiș County

- Location in Romania
- Coordinates: 45°28′N 21°14′E
- Country: Romania
- County: Timiș

Government
  - Mayor (2024–2028): Niculae-Ioan Pop (PNL)
- Area: 69.62 km^{2} (26.88 sq mi)
- Population (2021-12-01): 2,309
  - Density: 33.17/km^{2} (85.90/sq mi)
- Time zone: UTC+02:00 (EET)
  - Summer (DST): UTC+03:00 (EEST)
- Postal code: 307470–307471
- Vehicle reg.: TM
- Website: www.primariavoiteg.ro

Voiteg (Hungarian: Vejte; German: Wojtegg; Serbian: Војтењ, romanized: Vojtenj) is a commune in Timiș County, Romania. It is composed of two villages: Folea and Voiteg (commune seat).

== Etymology ==
Over time, the settlement has been known by many names. On one hand, several versions of Hungarian origin have been recorded: Vejte, Veytech, Veytsch, Wejtech, Wech, and Veycech. On the other hand, there are also German variants: Woiteg, Wojteg, Woitek, Wojtek, Voitek, and finally Voiteg. Under Romanian administration, beginning in 1924, the village was also given the name Voivodeni. Adding to this diversity, the railway station bears the name Voiteni—a designation increasingly adopted by locals when referring to the commune.

== Geography ==
The Voiteg commune is situated in the Banat Plain, with an average elevation of 85–90 meters. The terrain is flat and characterized by plains.

Due to its location, the Voiteg commune experiences a transitional continental climate with sub-Mediterranean influences, characterized by diverse and irregular atmospheric patterns.

== History ==
Voiteg has existed since the 14th century, being first mentioned in 1322. Its name was Veytech, after the owner Teodor Veytey. At that time, Voiteg was not where it is today, but a little further west of the railway. In 1332, in the papal tithe registers, the parish of Veytech is mentioned again.

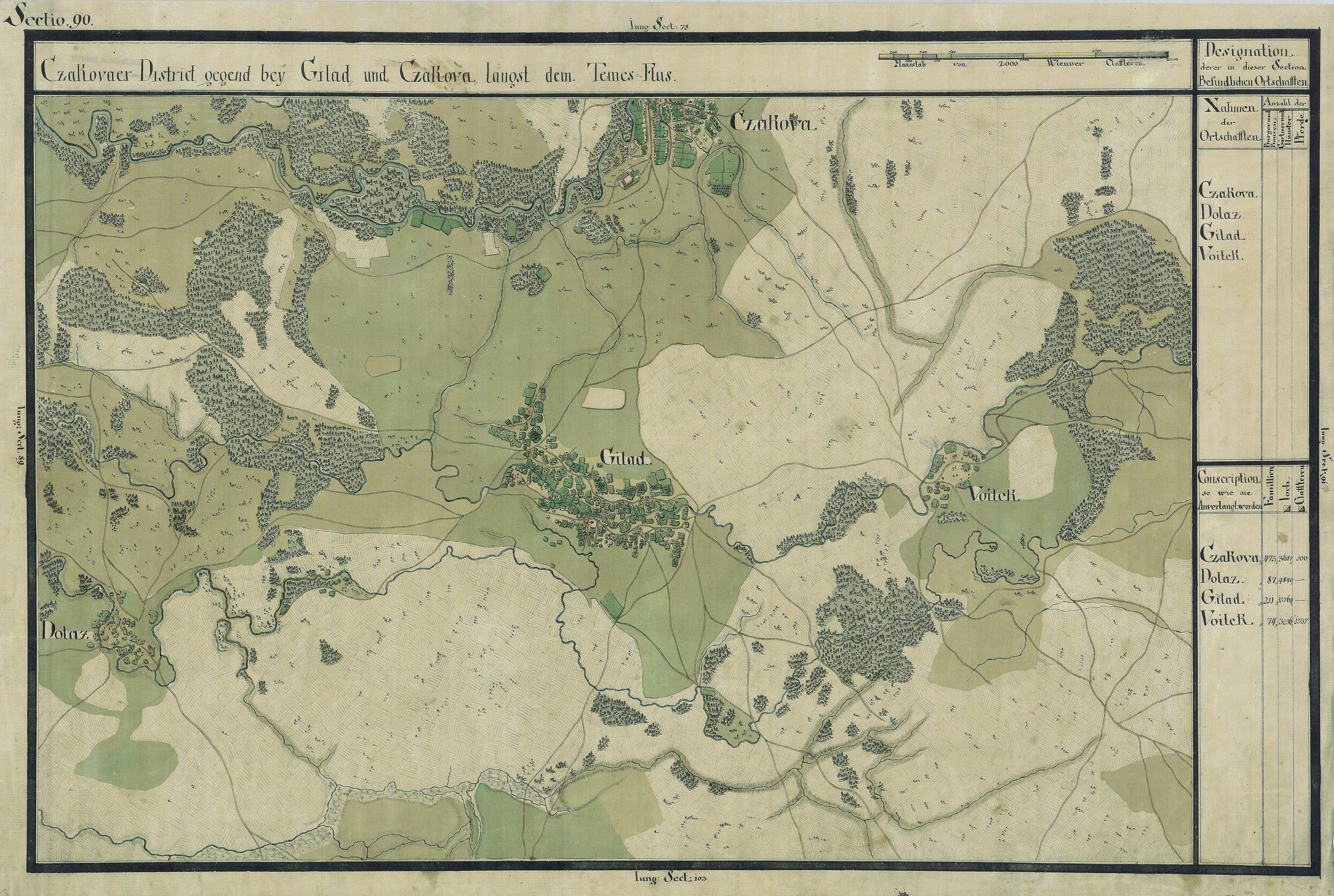
Voiteg (Voitek) in the Josephinian Land Survey of 1769–1772

Following the peasant uprising of 1437, which spread across Transylvania and the southern counties, the estate came under the ownership of landowners Valentin Karay and Benedikt Sümegi during the reign of King Albert of Austria (1437–1439). Under John Hunyadi's rule (1440–1444), Veytey passed to the Hagymási family of Beregsău. When the Ottomans occupied Banat in 1552, the noble estate of the Veyteys became part of the conquered territories under the administration of the Çakova estate. At that time, the few remaining huts of the ruined village of Vejthe were mainly inhabited by Romanian cattle herders. According to the first census and geographical survey conducted by Count Mercy after Banat's liberation in 1716/1717, the settlement comprised only 28 huts, all inhabited by Romanians.

Voiteg was also struck by the plague epidemic of 1738. At that time, the village was divided into two sections: one to the west, near the present-day train station, and another to the east, toward Folea. The eastern section was hit harder by the outbreak, claiming many lives. As a result, this area later became known as Bolia (from boală, meaning "disease").

During the reign of Empress Maria Theresa (1740–1780), the Italian Josef Brigido served as governor of Banat (1774–1780). He divided the state-owned lands and existing settlements into four districts, assigning the village of Voiteg to the Timișoara district. In 1776, Brigido ordered the reorganization of Voiteg, and a detailed plan was drawn up—later included in Franz Griselini's The History of the Banat (1780). In this plan, the village appears under the name Neu-Woitek ("New Voiteg"). The reorganization, carried out in 1776 at the village's present site, resulted in one of the most symmetrically and systematically designed settlements in the region.

When the village was reconstructed according to the 1776 plan, many building plots remained unoccupied. As a result, the Chamber Office ordered that German settlers be allocated to these vacant lots. Unlike in other mixed villages (such as Variaș, Sânpetru Mare, or Cenad), the population in Voiteg was not divided by nationality. Only one street was entirely Romanian, known as the "Walachische Gasse," and one was entirely German, called "Karlsdorf." As early as 1726, a few German families were already living in Voiteg, numbering around 20 individuals, though the exact figure is unknown. By 1820, records mention 17 people, and by 1833, the German population had grown to 145. The first German settlers leased land from Romanian owners, cultivating it with great diligence until they were eventually able to buy it. Most of the German population emigrated between 1990 and 1991.

A 5.6-magnitude earthquake damaged more than 500 houses in Voiteg on 2 December 1991.

== Demographics ==
Ethnic composition (2021)
1. Romanians (83.8%)
2. Hungarians (3.68%)
3. Roma (3.50%)
4. Germans (1.86%)
5. Unknown (5.54%)
6. Others (1.62%)
Religious composition (2021)
1. Orthodox (76.4%)
2. Roman Catholics (8.01%)
3. Pentecostals (4.33%)
4. Evangelicals (1.25%)
5. Baptists (1.03%)
6. Unknown (6.27%)
7. Others (2.55%)
8. Irreligious, atheists and agnostics (0.12%)

Voiteg had a population of 2,309 inhabitants at the 2021 census, down 5.25% from the 2011 census. Most inhabitants are Romanians (83.8%), larger minorities being represented by Hungarians (3.68%), Roma (3.5%) and Germans (1.86%). For 5.54% of the population, ethnicity is unknown. By religion, most inhabitants are Orthodox (76.44%), but there are also minorities of Roman Catholics (8.01%), Pentecostals (4.33%), Evangelicals (1.25%) and Baptists (1.03%). For 6.27% of the population, religious affiliation is unknown.

Census		Ethnic composition
Year	Population	Romanians	Hungarians	Germans	Roma	Serbs
1880	2,419	1,321	68	949	–	69
1890	3,301	1,453	316	1,449	–	79
1900	3,345	1,499	309	1,448	–	77
1910	3,182	1,539	350	1,249	–	20
1920	3,100	1,517	305	1,266	–	–
1930	3,140	1,595	355	1,174	–	11
1941	3,294	1,672	381	1,217	–	–
1956	2,923	1,894	414	586	–	25
1966	2,719	1,875	282	537	–	18
1977	2,908	2,150	282	454	4	14
1992	2,399	1,993	205	140	35	11
2002	2,427	2,136	174	70	34	4
2011	2,437	2,097	144	49	64	3
2021	2,309	1,935	85	43	81	3

== Politics and administration ==
The commune of Voiteg is administered by a mayor and a local council composed of 11 councilors. The mayor, Niculae-Ioan Pop, from the National Liberal Party, has been in office since 2021. As from the 2024 local elections, the local council has the following composition by political parties:

Party	Seats	Composition
National Liberal Party	6	
Social Democratic Party	2	
Alliance for the Union of Romanians	2	
Ind.	1	

== Education and culture ==
Voiteg commune has three schools and one kindergarten. In 2020, the schools within the commune had a total of 15 classrooms accommodating 71 students. In Voiteg, the Deutsche Ackerbauschule Wojteg was established in 1927 as a traditional agricultural school organized as a joint-stock company of local peasants. It educated the village's youth in crop cultivation and animal care. After 2000, the institution came under the ownership of the University of Life Sciences in Timișoara, becoming a Romanian–German pilot center for farmers in the Timiș region and an elite training school for them.

Within the territory of Voiteg commune, there are two cultural centers—one located in each of the localities that make up the commune. The largest traditional holiday in Voiteg is ruga, celebrated every year over two days on 8 September, coinciding with the feast of Saint Mary.

== Economy ==
The agricultural economy in the commune is reflected through both crop cultivation and animal husbandry. However, the primary processing of these products is minimally developed, with most of the produce primarily used to meet the self-consumption needs of the local population rather than being marketed commercially.

Small industry in the commune is represented by commercial companies engaged in various activities, including agriculture, healthcare, trade, tourism, and more.

== Infrastructure ==
The Voiteg commune is traversed by the national road DN59 (also known as E70). The link between Voiteg, Folea, and nearby localities is maintained via the national road DN59 and the county road DJ592B. Additionally, the commune is crossed by the Timișoara–Moravița railway and is the end of the line for the Voiteg–Reșița railway.
