= Foeni =

- Commune
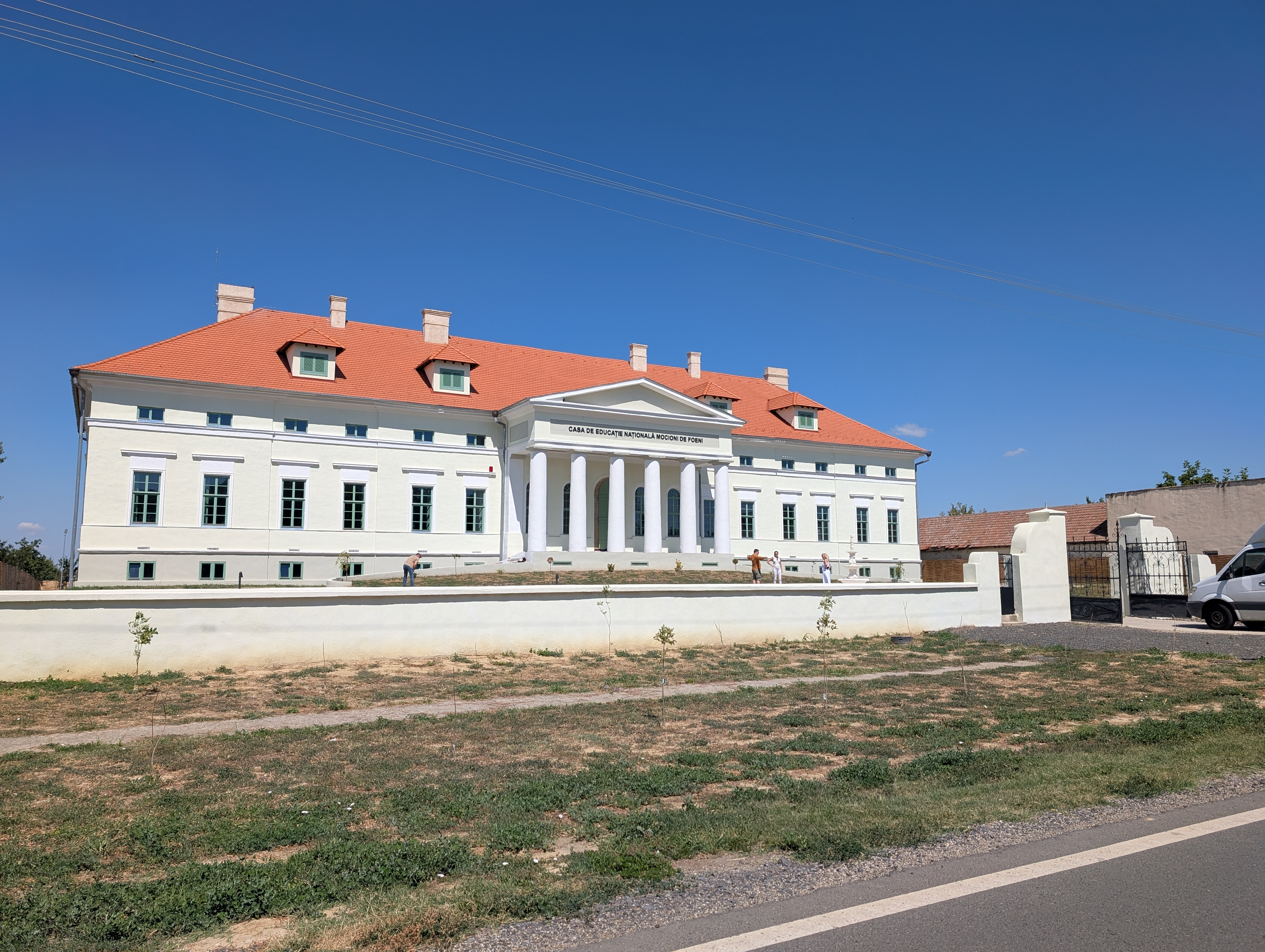
- Mocioni Mansion in Foeni

- Location in Timiș County

- Location in Romania
- Coordinates: 45°30′N 20°53′E
- Country: Romania
- County: Timiș

Government
  - Mayor (2020–): Saveta Moldovan (PSD)
- Area: 131 km^{2} (51 sq mi)
- Population (2021-12-01): 1,500
  - Density: 11/km^{2} (30/sq mi)
- Time zone: UTC+02:00 (EET)
  - Summer (DST): UTC+03:00 (EEST)
- Postal code: 307175–307176
- Vehicle reg.: TM
- Website: www.primariafoenitm.ro

Foeni (Hungarian: Fény; German: Fün or Feuenfeld; Serbian: Фењ, romanized: Fenj) is a commune in Timiș County, Romania. It is composed of two villages, Cruceni and Foeni (commune seat).

== Geography ==
Foeni is located in the southwest of Timiș County, on the border with Serbia. It borders Uivar to the north, Ciacova and Giulvăz to the east, Giera to the south and Serbia to the west. The entire territory of the commune is included in the Great Plain of Timiș, which sprawls in the west and southwest of the county, a flat land, with heights not exceeding 80 m (260 ft). At the southern limit of the commune is the Timiș River (on the east–west direction). On the north–south direction, the commune is crossed by Bega Mică, partially canalized.

The territory of the commune is unitary; the average annual temperature is about 11 °C (52 °F). The coldest month is January, and the maximum temperatures are recorded in July. The most frequent winds are from the east; the most violent winds blow from the west, northwest, bringing strong storms especially during August and September.

Like the rest of the area, the landscape of Foeni is extremely flat; vegetation is missing, pronounced unevenness is missing. The areas bordering the waters are the only ones where the vegetation and the immediate relief change the local characteristics of the landscape.

== History ==
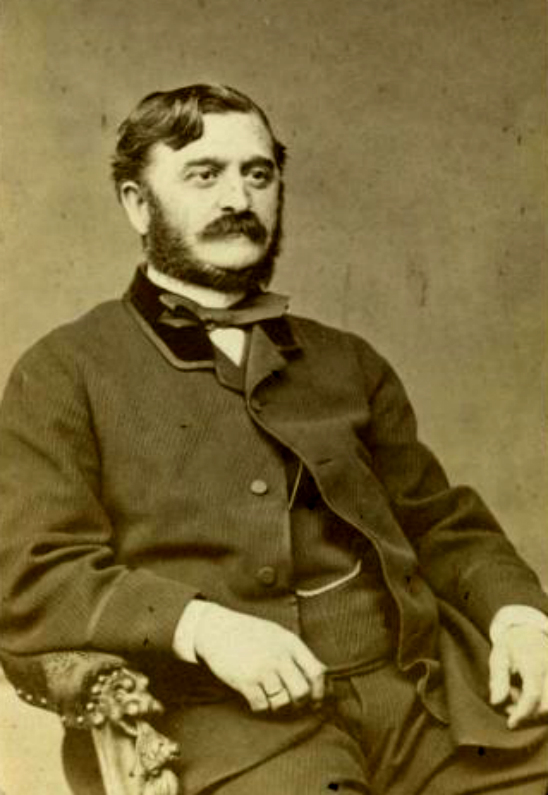
Andrei Mocioni, owner of the Foeni estate in the early 19th century, as a Romanian deputy to the Diet of Hungary

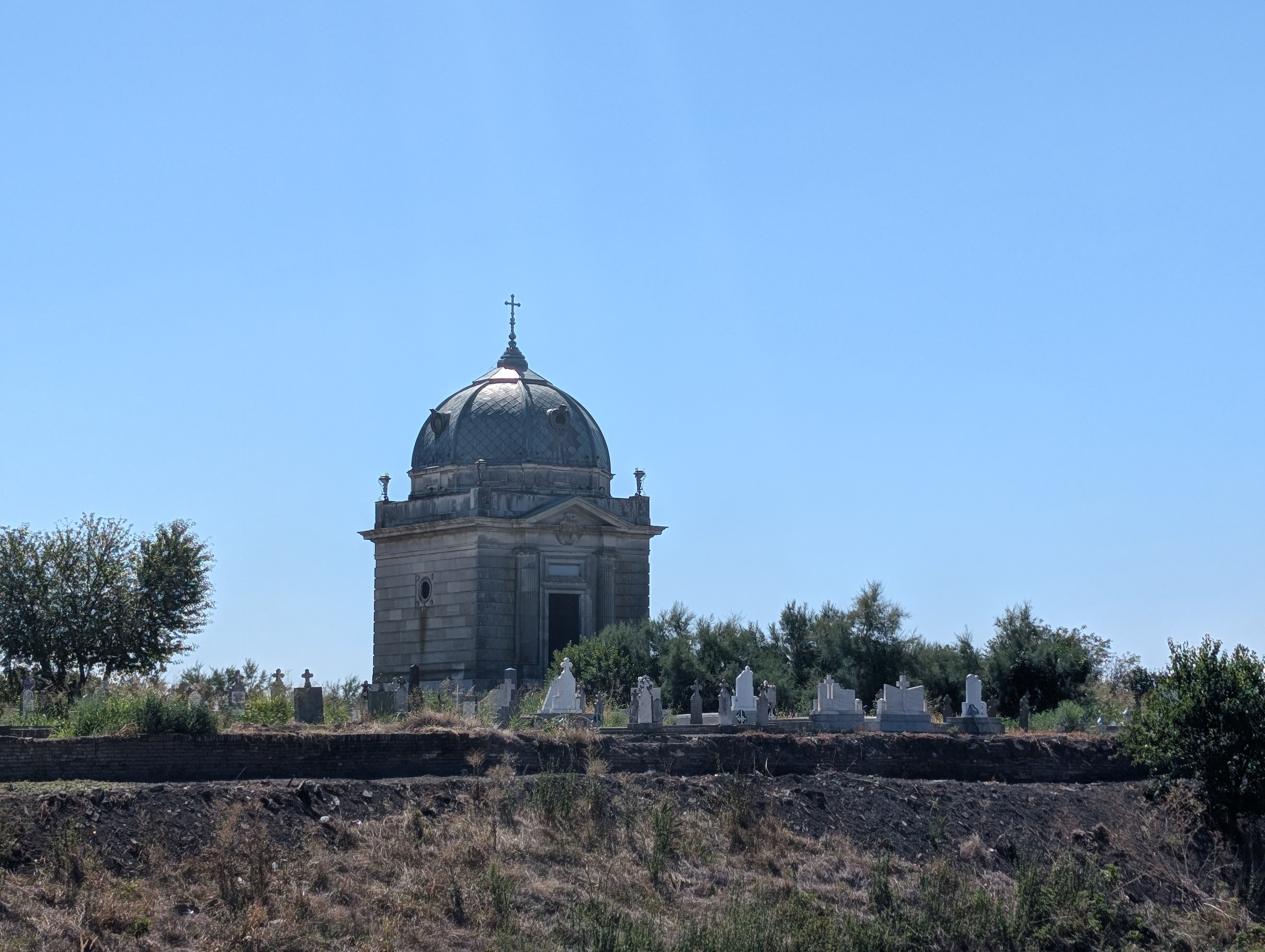
Mocsonyi family shrine in Foeni

Foeni was first mentioned in 1289, under the name Föen, on the occasion of the convocation here of a diet by King Ladislaus III. Attested by the Ravenna Geographer, the Roman castrum of Bacaucis lay on the site of present-day Foeni, on the road from Tibiscum to Lederata. The first to undertake systematic research was Augustin Bárány, in 1845, after a large number of objects and bricks with Roman seals were found in the area. In 1890, Francisc Cumont made a scientific description of the results of Bárány's research and concluded that in and around the garden of the Mocioni Mansion was the foundation of the Roman castrum. At the same time, epigraphic monuments, coins, vessels and so on were discovered.

In 934, in Foeni, in the place called Vadum Arenarum, near the Timiș River, a battle between the Hungarian invaders and the reunited troops of the Pechenegs, Romanians and Bulgarians led by Duke Glad took place. The battle ended with Glad's defeat, who then had to prepare a new resistance at Kevea (probably Kovin, Serbia) and then at Orșova. Although he lost the battles, Glad and his successors continued to lead the duchy until 1003–1004 when Glad's dynasty was replaced by Chanadinus.

At the beginning of the 18th century, after the conquest of the area by the Austrians, due to the conflict only 18 houses remained in Foeni. Towards the end of the same century the Mocioni family appeared in the area. They established their residence in Foeni, where in 1750 they built a Neoclassical mansion.

Cruceni was originally located in the "Place of the Cross" (Romanian: Locul crucii), a few kilometers from the current village, towards the Timiș River. The present-day Cruceni was created by German colonization in 1722, being designed according to the same Austrian models adapted to Banat, with straight and perpendicular streets. The first church, a Roman Catholic one, was built in 1780. The new church was built in 1914. After the establishment of the Austro-Hungarian dualism in 1868, the first Hungarian families of tobacco growers began to come to Cruceni. 75 families settled here at that time, to each of whom a plot of land consisting of one juger of built-up land and seven jugers of arable land was distributed. Towards the end of the 19th century, the village became predominantly Hungarian, while Germans moved to other localities.

Foeni and Cruceni were severely affected by the April 2005 floods that saw 90% of homes flooded and 1,100 people displaced.

== Demographics ==
Ethnic composition (2021)
1. Romanians (74.7%)
2. Hungarians (11.1%)
3. Serbs (5.33%)
4. Unknown (8.20%)
5. Others (0.68%)
Religious composition (2021)
1. Orthodox (71.5%)
2. Roman Catholics (12.1%)
3. Serbian Orthodox (5.06%)
4. Pentecostals (2.06%)
5. Unknown (8.40%)
6. Others (0.89%)

Foeni had a population of 1,500 inhabitants at the 2021 census, down 13.64% from the 2011 census. Most inhabitants are Romanians (74.73%), larger minorities being represented by Hungarians (11.06%) and Serbs (5.33%). For 8.2% of the population, ethnicity is unknown. By religion, most inhabitants are Orthodox (71.46%), but there are also minorities of Roman Catholics (12.13%), Serbian Orthodox (5.06%) and Pentecostals (2.06%). For 8.4% of the population, religious affiliation is unknown.

Census		Ethnic composition
Year	Population	Romanians	Hungarians	Germans	Roma	Serbs
1880	2,432	1,464	439	62	–	464
1890	2,716	1,433	674	70	–	536
1900	2,997	1,323	1,040	112	–	495
1910	3,011	1,241	1,205	49	–	496
1920	2,845	1,164	1,180	46	–	–
1930	2,962	1,371	1,094	41	8	443
1941	2,810	1,350	963	30	–	–
1956	2,392	1,124	869	16	6	375
1966	2,218	1,132	749	10	3	322
1977	1,926	1,038	594	12	17	258
1992	1,639	1,093	369	2	9	164
2002	1,713	1,274	299	2	6	129
2011	1,737	1,300	241	3	19	102
2021	1,500	1,121	166	–	8	80

== Politics and administration ==
The commune of Foeni is administered by a mayor and a local council composed of 10 councilors. The mayor, Saveta Moldovan, from the Social Democratic Party, has been in office since 2020. As from the 2024 local elections, the local council has the following composition by political parties:

Party	Seats	Composition
Social Democratic Party	7	
Alliance for the Union of Romanians	1	
National Liberal Party	1	
S.O.S. Romania	1	

== Notable people ==
- Mirko Jivcovici (1921–2019), prose writer, translator and lexicographer
