= Giera =

- Commune
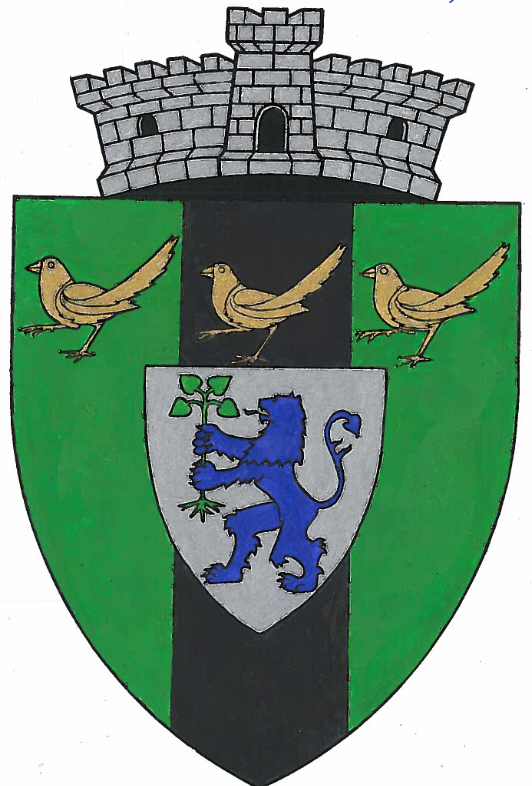
- Coat of arms

- Location in Timiș County

- Location in Romania
- Coordinates: 45°24′N 21°0′E
- Country: Romania
- County: Timiș

Government
  - Mayor (2016–): Radu-Ionel Vicol (PSD)
- Area: 91 km^{2} (35 sq mi)
- Population (2021-12-01): 1,131
  - Density: 12/km^{2} (32/sq mi)
- Time zone: EET/EEST (UTC+2/+3)
- Postal code: 307215–307217
- Vehicle reg.: TM

Giera (Hungarian: Gyér; German: Gier; Serbian: Ђир, romanized: Đir) is a commune in Timiș County, Romania. It is composed of three villages: Giera (commune seat), Grănicerii and Toager.

== History ==
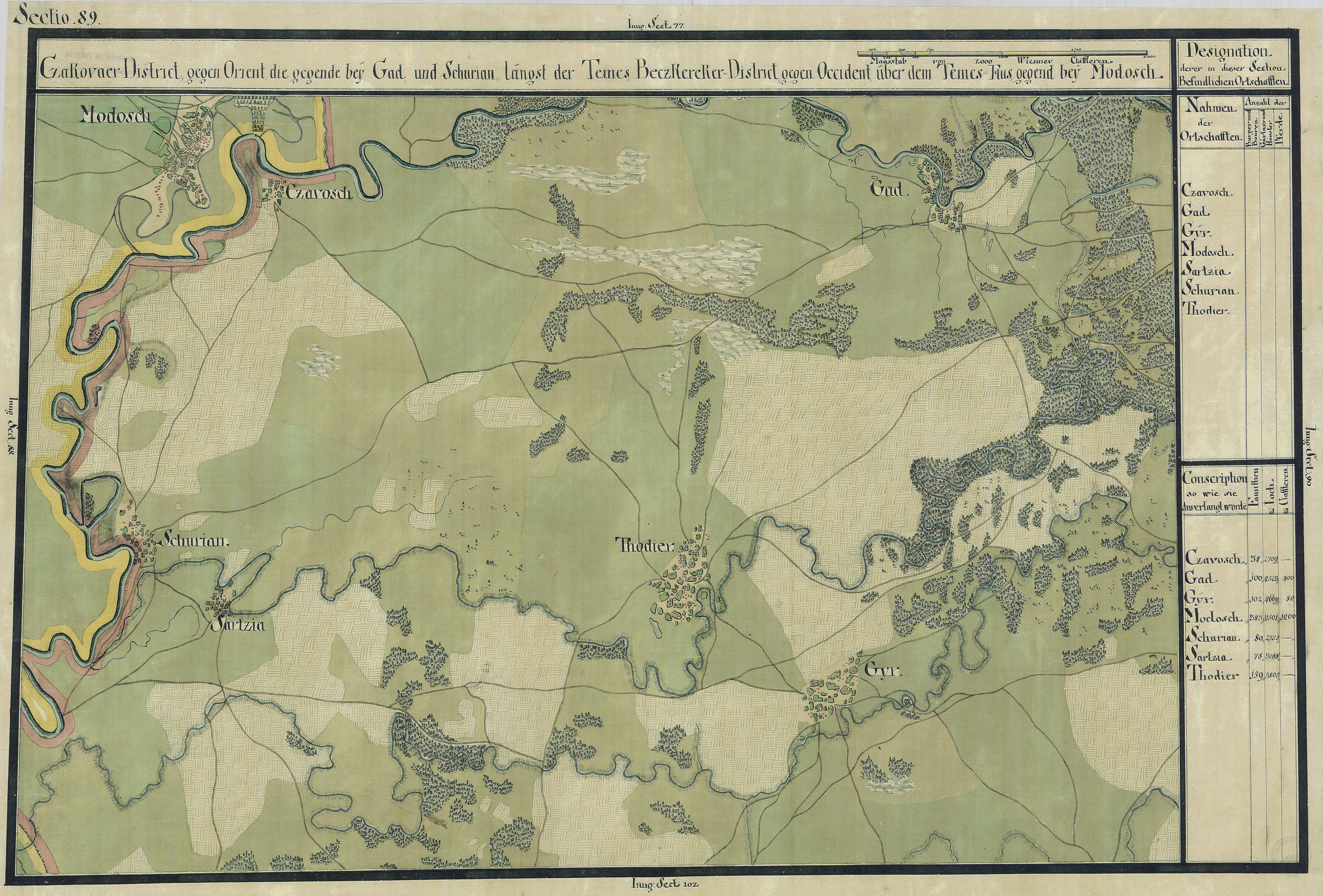
Giera (Gyr) and Toager (Thodier) in the Josephinische Landesaufnahme of 1769–1772

The first recorded mention of Giera dates from 1322, when it was a property of the Csanád clan; Tivadar Vejtehi donated it to his son-in-law Omori Gál. At the 1717 census, in Giera there were 12 houses inhabited by Serbs and an Orthodox church (built since 1667). They settled here during the 17th century. From 1795, the domain (including Toager, Grănicerii and Livezile) came into the possession of the Gyertyánffy family, a Hungarian noble family of Armenian origin, taking the name Gyér. In 1829, Lukács Gyertyánffy built a mansion in Giera, near the grain storehouse (now a historical monument), built in turn by Andor Gyertyánffy; the mansion is preserved to this day. The Gyertyánffys also owned a grove called Gradinaț (Hungarian: Grádácz), where an Avar ring and a Turkish fortress were later unearthed.

== Demographics ==
Ethnic composition (2021)
1. Romanians (61.7%)
2. Hungarians (12.7%)
3. Roma (8.66%)
4. Serbs (4.06%)
5. Unknown (12.6%)
6. Others (0.29%)
Religious composition (2021)
1. Orthodox (65.1%)
2. Roman Catholics (13.5%)
3. Serbian Orthodox (4.50%)
4. Pentecostals (1.50%)
5. Unknown (14.1%)
6. Others (1.10%)
7. Irreligious, atheists and agnostics (0.26%)

Giera had a population of 1,131 inhabitants at the 2021 census, down 8.71% from the 2011 census. Most inhabitants are Romanians (61.71%), larger minorities being represented by Hungarians (12.73%), Roma (8.66%) and Serbs (4.06%). For 12.55% of the population, ethnicity is unknown. By religion, most inhabitants are Orthodox (65.07%), but there are also minorities of Roman Catholics (13.52%), Serbian Orthodox (4.5%) and Pentecostals (1.5%). For 14.05% of the population, religious affiliation is unknown.

Census		Ethnic composition
Year	Population	Romanians	Hungarians	Germans	Roma	Serbs
1880	2,888	834	353	1,290	–	397
1890	3,442	837	588	1,550	–	458
1900	3,504	850	668	1,514	–	457
1910	3,483	943	652	1,345	–	527
1920	3,461	875	732	1,362	–	–
1930	3,221	1,045	493	1,260	1	404
1941	3,261	1,177	560	1,147	–	–
1956	2,473	856	520	764	–	317
1966	2,185	774	512	652	–	244
1977	1,697	750	414	349	11	170
1992	1,228	719	303	43	64	97
2002	1,321	855	276	32	88	64
2011	1,239	812	211	21	99	56
2021	1,131	698	144	–	98	46

== Politics and administration ==
The commune of Giera is administered by a mayor and a local council composed of 8 councilors. The mayor, Radu-Ionel Vicol, from the National Liberal Party, has been in office since 2016. As from the 2024 local elections, the local council has the following composition by political parties:

Party	Seats	Composition
National Liberal Party	3	
Social Democratic Party	3	
Social Liberal Humanist Party	1	
Save Romania Union	1	
