= Liebling, Timiș =

Administrative subdivision in Timiș, Romania

Liebling
- Commune
- Location in Timiș County

- Location in Romania
- Coordinates: 45°35′N 21°19′E
- Country: Romania
- County: Timiș

Government
  - Mayor (2008–): Ioan-Gheorghe Munteanu (PSD)
- Area: 82.26 km^{2} (31.76 sq mi)
- Elevation: 76 m (249 ft)
- Population (2021-12-01): 3,358
  - Density: 40.82/km^{2} (105.7/sq mi)
- Time zone: EET/EEST (UTC+2/+3)
- Postal code: 307245–307247
- Vehicle reg.: TM
- Website: primarialiebling.ro

Liebling (formerly Brist; German: Liebling; Hungarian: Liebling or Kedvenc; Serbian: Либлинг, romanized: Libling) is a commune in Timiș County, Romania. It is composed of three villages: Cerna, Iosif and Liebling (commune seat).

== Geography ==
Liebling is located in the southwest of Timiș County, 35 km (22 mi) from Timișoara and 20 km (12 mi) from Ciacova, the nearest town.

=== Hydrography ===
Liebling belongs to the Timiș river basin. Tofoaia Valley crosses Liebling to the north, flowing into the Timiș River through the Birda-Lanca Canal.

=== Climate ===
The influence of the Mediterranean and oceanic air masses makes the winters shorter and milder with a positive average temperature of 0.2 °C (32.4 °F), the coldest month being January. Springs are earlier and warmer, but short and with large temperature variations caused by the activity of cyclones in the Mediterranean and the Atlantic. Summers are long and hot. Autumns are also long, conducive to harvesting.

== History ==
The first recorded mention of a settlement on present-day Liebling dates from 1332. The medieval village was called Beesd and appears in papal tithe records as having a parish. Around 1597, in a Hungarian diploma, it is mentioned as Briszt.

The modern village was established in 1786–1788 by colonizing Protestant Germans from Pfalz and Nuremberg. The village was built according to a well-established plan by the Timișoara administration, under the supervision of Commissioner Wallbrunn, who ordered the construction of 290 new houses, with straight and parallel streets. In the first year only 102 families arrived; the rest came later. The commune thus founded was named by Commissioner Wallbrunn Vécsháza, after the then governor of Banat. According to oral tradition, the governor, because he loved Protestants, changed it to Liebling (meaning "darling" in German), a name that became official in 1828, the year the Evangelical Lutheran church was built.

After World War I, Romanian families moved here from present-day Alba County, which, through the agrarian reform, were put in possession of land (1926). The Romanian population grew post-war, the Germans migrated massively, especially after 1989, and the commune is today mostly Romanian.

== Demographics ==
Ethnic composition (2021)
1. Romanians (83.4%)
2. Roma (2.68%)
3. Hungarians (1.75%)
4. Unknown (11.4%)
5. Others (0.73%)
Religious composition (2021)
1. Orthodox (72.1%)
2. Pentecostals (7.14%)
3. Roman Catholics (3.09%)
4. Greek Catholics (2.68%)
5. Unknown (12.2%)
6. Others (2.54%)
7. Irreligious, atheists and agnostics (0.26%)

Liebling had a population of 3,358 inhabitants at the 2021 census, down 9.81% from the 2011 census. Most inhabitants are Romanians (83.44%), larger minorities being represented by Roma (2.68%) and Hungarians (1.75%). For 11.4% of the population, ethnicity is unknown. By religion, most inhabitants are Orthodox (72.12%), but there are also minorities of Pentecostals (7.14%), Roman Catholics (3.09%) and Greek Catholics (2.68%). For 12.17% of the population, religious affiliation is unknown.

Census		Ethnic composition
Year	Population	Romanians	Hungarians	Germans	Roma
1880	4,085	719	28	3,318	–
1890	4,429	739	71	3,593	–
1900	4,923	756	90	4,073	–
1910	5,178	801	187	4,168	–
1920	5,018	699	49	4,267	–
1930	4,997	872	35	4,072	13
1941	5,086	886	49	4,086	–
1956	4,371 (Note: Prior to 1954, Iosif was part of Jebel commune.)	2,237	458	1,647	17
1966	4,025	2,235	415	1,343	24
1977	4,031	2,674	308	987	57
1992	3,606	3,233	196	57	100
2002	3,735	3,368	176	32	142
2011	3,723	3,237	126	30	159
2021	3,358	2,802	59	14	90

== Politics and administration ==
The commune of Liebling is administered by a mayor and a local council composed of 13 councilors. The mayor, Ioan-Gheorghe Munteanu, from the Social Democratic Party, has been in office since 2008. As from the 2024 local elections, the local council has the following composition by political parties:

Party	Seats	Composition
Social Democratic Party	5	
Alliance for the Union of Romanians	4	
Save Romania Union–People's Movement Party–Force of the Right	2	
Strong Romania Party	1	
National Liberal Party	1	
