= Ciacova =

- Town
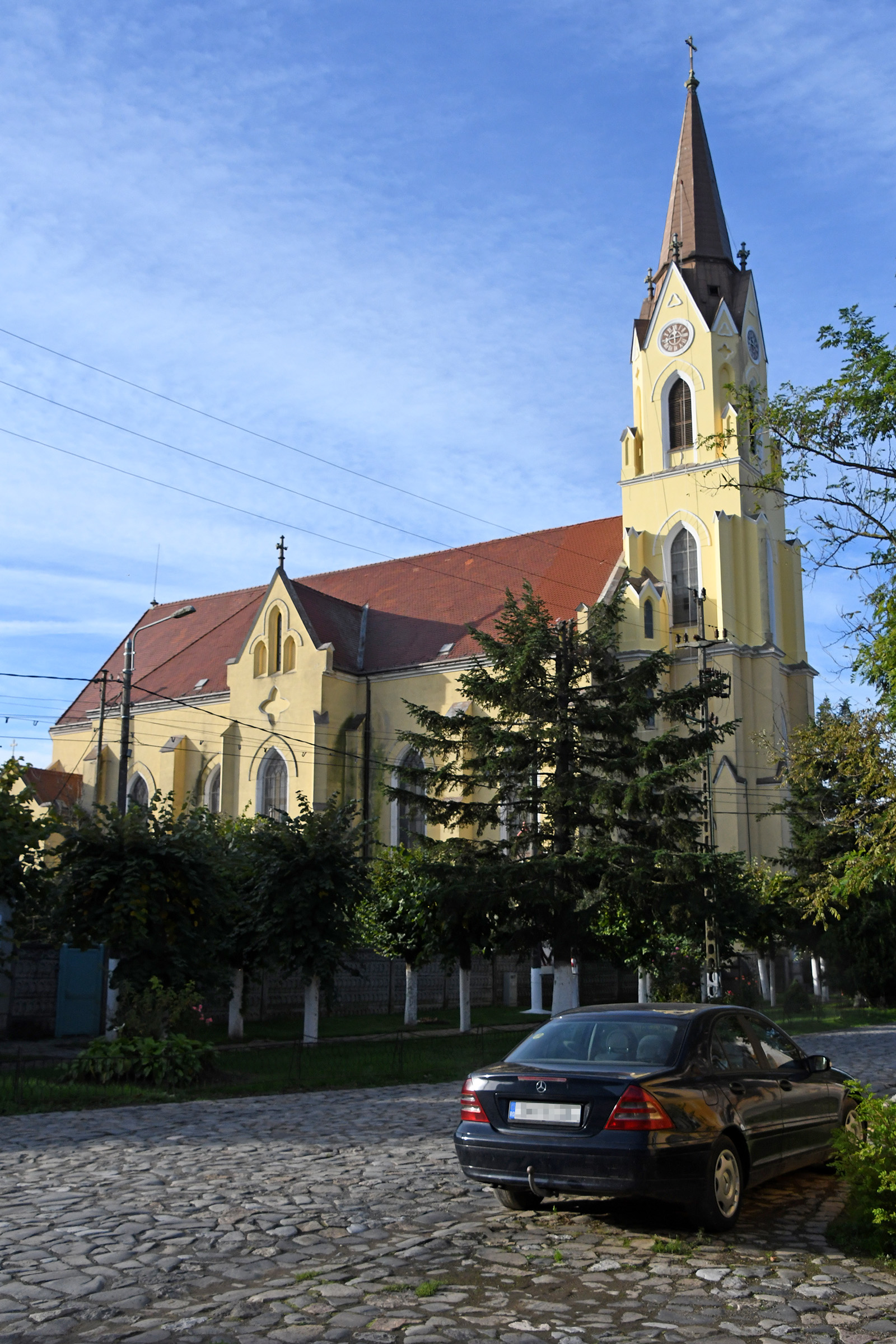
- The Roman Catholic church

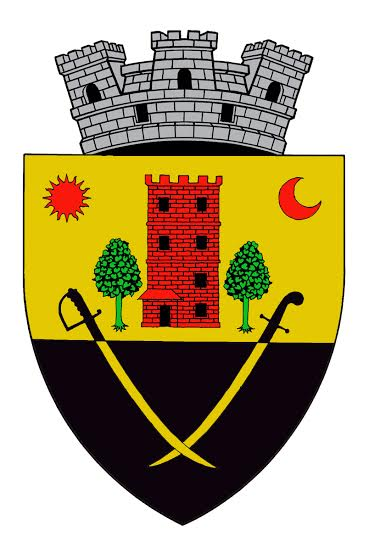
- Coat of arms

- Location in Timiș County

- Location in Romania
- Coordinates: 45°32′22″N 21°6′44″E
- Country: Romania
- County: Timiș

Government
  - Mayor (2024–2028): Petru Filip (PNL)
- Area: 130 km^{2} (50 sq mi)
- Population (2021-12-01): 5,434
  - Density: 42/km^{2} (110/sq mi)
- Time zone: UTC+02:00 (EET)
  - Summer (DST): UTC+03:00 (EEST)
- Postal code: 307110–307117
- Vehicle reg.: TM
- Website: www.primariaciacova.ro

Ciacova (Hungarian: Csák; German: Tschakowa; Serbian: Чаково, romanized: Čakovo; Turkish: Çakova) is a town in Timiș County, Romania. It administers four villages: Cebza, Macedonia, Obad and Petroman. When it was declared a town in 2004, the villages of Gad and Ghilad, which it administered up to that point, were split off to form Ghilad commune.

== Name ==
In both Romanian and Hungarian vocabularies, there are the names ceacău (in Romanian), csákó (in Hungarian) and csák (in Old Hungarian):

- ceacău, meaning "tall and hard military cap made of leather or felt"; it was used until the end of World War II by hunting and targeting troops, then only by police troops. It is therefore possible that Ciacova got its name from this word and meant a locality around a defense post.
- csák, meaning "peak". Accepting this translation, the Ciacova Fortress is explained as a "peak of defense" against any enemy intervention from the east or southeast.

Some local historians claim that the name comes from a Dacian word, ending in "-ava" and therefore Ciacava. However, no documents or other evidence can be found to support this thesis. In 1808 János Lipszky claims that the name Ciacova comes from the Romanian language, but does not provide evidence in support of this statement.

== Geography ==
Ciacova is located in the Timiș Plain, on Timișul Mort River, about 28 km (17 mi) southwest of Timișoara.

=== Relief ===
The relief is flat, with a slight inclination to the southwest in the divagation area of Banat rivers to the Tisa. The Timiș Plain is an accumulation plain originally connected to the Pannonian Plain, formed in the Quaternary by the waters that clogged the Pannonian Lake. This lake was formed by the sinking of a part of the Carpathians in the Mesozoic.

There is only slight dishevelment in the plain. There are small depressions (cenotes), remnants of lakes, ponds or swamps that existed here until the 18th century, when the Austro-Hungarian Empire executed a vast plan of drainage and damming. Today, the remains of these ponds can be seen in the field in the form of slightly deepened circles that are whiter than the black plowed land; these are the so-called salt marshes.

In the Ciacova area, the surface of the various forms of microrelief is occupied 85% by field, 2.5% by cenotes, 3% by valleys, 2% by terraces, 1% by riverbed sands, 0.8% by dry lakes, 0.5% by floodplain and 5.2% by roads, streets and ditches.

=== Hydrography ===
Hydrologically, the territory of Ciacova belongs to the reception basin of Timiș. More precisely, Ciacova is located on the left bank of Timișul Mort. Timișul Mort ("Dead Timiș") is the old and natural valley of the Timiș River in the puszta area of Banat. It "died" in the 18th century with the drainage of the Banat swamps, when the Austro-Hungarian Empire artificially created the current anthropic valley of the Timiș by Cebza, Macedonia, etc. Timișul Mort is today a swampy area with small waterholes, ponds full of helophyte plants, rushes, reeds, duckweeds, etc.

=== Climate ===
From a climatological point of view, Ciacova is part of the Tisa climate, i.e., a moderate continental climate with slight influences of the Mediterranean and oceanic climates, with relatively mild winters and hot but not excessively dry summers.

The average annual temperature is 11.1 °C (52.0 °F), and the frequency of warm years is higher than that of cool years, due to the fact that Ciacova is south of the annual isotherm of 11 °C. The warmest month is July. The coldest month is January, with an average multiannual temperature of −2.6 °C (27.3 °F).

The winds are determined by the development of baric systems that cross the Banat Plain. These baric systems are: the Azores High, the (winter) Siberian High, the Icelandic Low and the Mediterranean Low. In Ciacova, the dominant winds are the southwest ones.

Due to the cyclonic activity and the humid air invasions from the west, the southwest and the northwest, in Banat the precipitations are more abundant than in the Wallachian Plain. In the Ciacova area the average annual precipitation amount is 588 mm (23.1 in). The season with the richest rainfall is summer, then spring, autumn and winter. Heavy rains during the summer are due to cyclones and humid air masses coming from the Atlantic, to which is added the thermal convection that develops large cumulonimbus clouds from which heavy rains fall. The average number of snowy days is 20 annually. The first snow falls around 29 November, and the last around 14 March (106 days).

=== Flora ===
Ciacova is located in the forest-steppe area. Here are plants that belong to the Eurasian, Central European, continental, Mediterranean and Balkan floristic elements. The natural vegetation has been largely changed due to human intervention, being replaced by agricultural crops. In the 18th century, Francesco Griselini mentioned the existence of Quercus forests in this area, with the predominance of sessile oak. Today these forests have been cleared. However, a small patch of forest can still be seen in the village of Macedonia, near the Timiș River. The species here include: Quercus robur, Ulmus glabra, Fraxinus excelsior, Acer campestre, Carpinus betulus, etc. The undergrowth in the forest has as representatives: Crataegus monogyna, Corylus avellana, Prunus spinosa, Cornus sanguinea, Euonymus europaeus, Ligustrum vulgare, hanging plants (Hedera helix, Clematis vitalba), etc.

Gramineae predominate in the grassy layer: Poa pratensis, Festuca pratensis, Dactylis glomerata, etc. Along the Timiș and Timișul Mort there are remains of riverside coppices, but in the meadows there are species of Salix alba, Salix × fragilis, rarely Salix purpurea, Rosa canina and Robinia pseudoacacia. The grassy vegetation in the meadow consists of forage plants: Agrostis gigantea, Lolium perenne, etc. High humidity develops mesophilic and hydrophilic species: Juncus effusus, Carex acuta, Cyperus fuscus, etc. In ponds predominate: Phragmites australis, Typha angustifolia, Iris pseudacorus, etc. In the meadows, isolated specimens of Prunus spinosa and Rosa canina can be found. The pastures in the meadow are of good quality, providing the green mass for the animals.

=== Fauna ===
Among the mammals, rodents predominate: hamster, mole rat, hare, otter, ground squirrel, then polecat, fox, badger and wild boar (in Macedonia Forest). Among the raptors are: buzzard, northern goshawk, etc. There are many species of galliformes, passerines and ciconiiformes. In the field can be found crawlers like lizards, and in the waters batrachians such as green frog and moor frog. In the dead arms of Timiș, on Timișul Mort and in Timiș there are fish: carp, pike, rudd, Prussian carp, etc.

== History ==
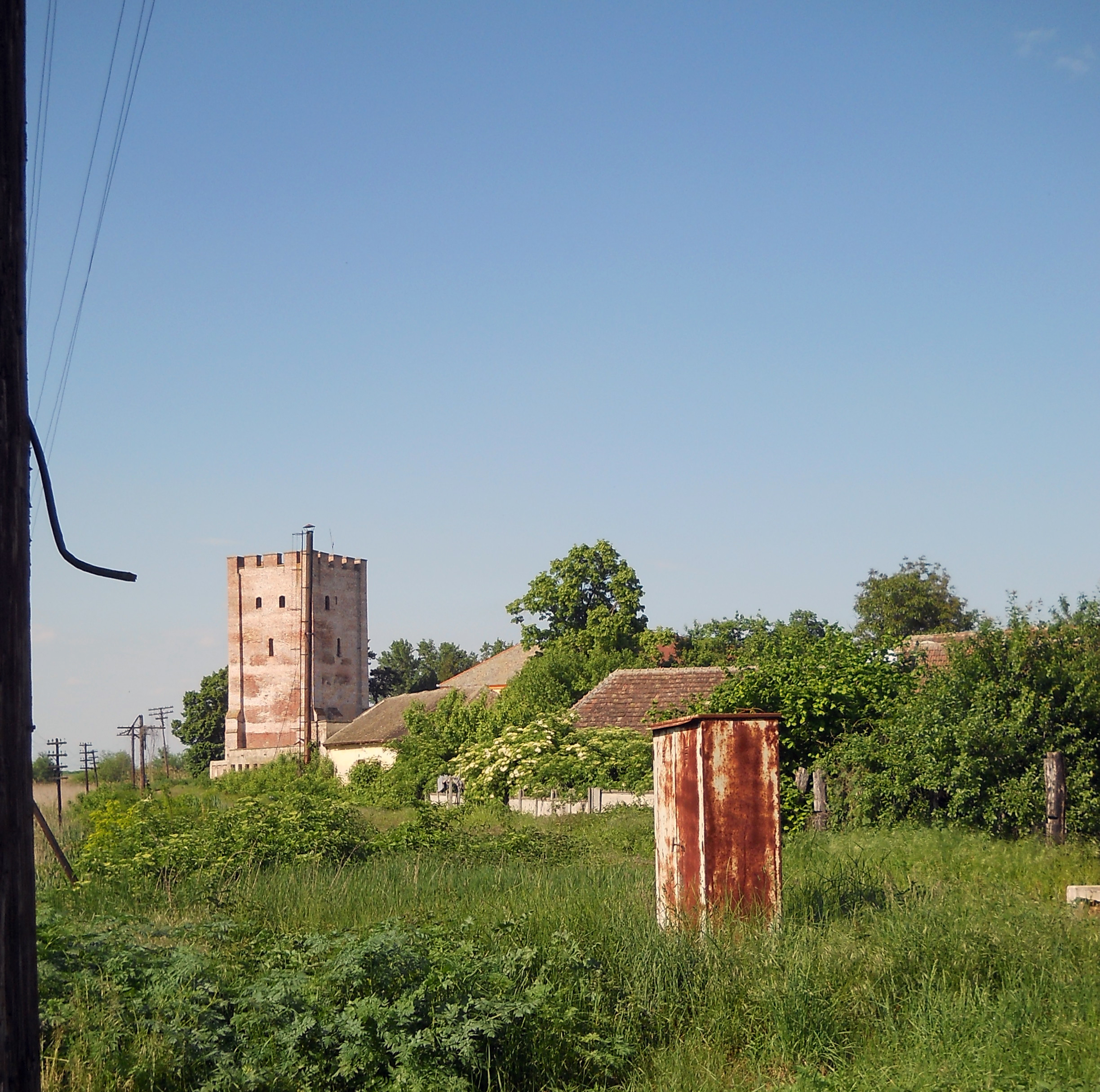
The culă of the former Ciacova Fortress, destroyed in 1701

Ciacova first appears in written history in 1220, when Count Bebich named a certain Chak in his will. The old name is of Hungarian origin and comes from the Csák family. The history of the locality is related to this family, which had extensive estates in the counties of Csanád, Arad, Temes and Zaránd. Some representatives of the family played an important role in the medieval history of Hungary, such as Ugrin Csák, who was metropolitan of Esztergom and prefect of Csanád. The invasion of the Tatars shattered the links of the settlement with the Csák family, and after its destruction, King Béla IV gave it to the Pechenegs and Cumans. In 1285, as a result of the Cuman revolution, Ciacova was liberated again and returned to Miklós Csák. It is very probable that the settlement was re-established at that time, because in the papal tithe records of 1332–1333, Ciacova already had the status of a rural commune. After 1389, when the battle of Kosovo Polje took place on 28 June, the Serbs were defeated by the Turks, and thousands of Serb families fled across the Danube and settled in southern Hungary and Banat; this is how the first Serbs appeared in Ciacova. They formed a separate settlement near the existing town, named Tót-Csák in Hungarian or Csakova in Serbian. Tót means "Slovak" in Hungarian, but Tótorság means Slavonia, as most settlers were Serbs from Drava–Sava area.

Between 1392–1395, a fortress was built here, surrounded by a network of canals, making it difficult to conquer. In 1395, brothers Miklós and György Csáky gave the fortress to King Sigismund of Luxembourg in exchange for property in Transylvania. Miklós even became voivode of Transylvania, and his son Ulászló baptized Matthias Corvinus, the future king of Hungary. On 18 September 1551, Ciacova is conquered by the Turks. The defenders of the fortress were prepared to withstand a long siege, but, according to one hypothesis, the Serbs, who had long been at enmity with the Hungarian chatelaines, betrayed the secrets of the fortress to the Turks. It is true that in this way they prevented the destruction of the fortress and the locality. The Turks built a veritable Turkish quarter in the town, superimposed approximately today by the Fortress' Square, on the land abandoned after the retreat of the Hungarians, south of the fortress. The Ciacova Fortress had a minor strategic importance for the Turks, being located "25 days on horseback" from Istanbul, the capital of the Ottoman Empire. For this reason, the fortress was left to ruin. In 1698–1699 Hamin Pasha brings settlers from Transylvania to Banat, and therefore to Ciacova. Following the Treaty of Karlowitz on 26 January 1699, under the command of Count Wolf of Oettingen, the Ciacova Fortress was destroyed, leaving only the culă (defense tower).

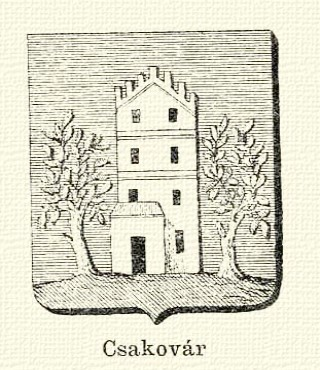
The old coat of arms of Ciacova

The conquest of Banat by the Habsburgs brought a new direction for the development of the small market town. After 1722, the town was heavily colonized by Germans (Swabians) but also Austrians, Czechs, Slovaks, Luxembourgers, Croats, etc. The first Catholic church was built in 1733. But because Ciacova was repeatedly attacked by the Turks, many settlers left here. Colonization continued and in 1768 Ciacova adopted German as its official language. After 1787, 126 Slovak families were colonized, forming for a long time a large ethnic community and from which the present-day Slovak Street is preserved. At first Ciacova had been run by two separate town halls; in 1820 the German and Serbian town halls were reunited, and since 1823 Ciacova has had the status of a plain town (oppidum).

In 1807, the Ciacova-based Religious Fund was established, which aimed to colonize Hungarians in the Győr, Moson and Szeged areas. But the Hungarians did not become as numerous as the Romanians and Germans. The latter left the town en masse until 1992.

Throughout its history, Ciacova has been a seat of district, plasă, raion and plain town. According to Law no. 83/2004, starting with April 2004, Ciacova received the status of town.

== Demographics ==
Ethnic composition (2021)
1. Romanians (78.7%)
2. Roma (5.24%)
3. Hungarians (4.30%)
4. Unknown (10.0%)
5. Others (1.70%)
Religious composition (2021)
1. Orthodox (74.6%)
2. Roman Catholics (7.12%)
3. Pentecostals (5.11%)
4. Unknown (10.4%)
5. Others (2.60%)
6. Irreligious, atheists and agnostics (0.16%)

Ciacova had a population of 5,434 inhabitants at the 2021 census, up 1.61% from the 2011 census. Most inhabitants are Romanians (78.72%), larger minorities being represented by Roma (5.24%) and Hungarians (4.3%). For 10.04% of the population, ethnicity is unknown. By religion, most inhabitants are Orthodox (74.62%), but there are also minorities of Roman Catholics (7.12%) and Pentecostals (5.11%). For 10.39% of the population, religious affiliation is unknown.

Census		Ethnic composition
Year	Population	Romanians	Hungarians	Germans	Roma	Serbs
1880	8,882	5,151	329	2,558	–	790
1890	9,778	5,455	518	2,971	–	670
1900	10,448	5,722	705	3,185	–	653
1910	10,128	5,749	797	2,765	–	537
1920	9,043	5,565	523	2,463	–	–
1930	8,775	5,442	594	2,160	197	224
1941	8,515	5,288	666	2,084	–	–
1956	7,955	–	–	–	–	–
1966	8,204	5,866	749	1,196	129	227
1977	7,173	5,163	590	907	248	210
1992	5,390	4,299	457	236	255	121
2002	5,301	4,406	406	126	240	86
2011	5,348	4,266	333	88	229	66
2021	5,434	4,278	234	31	285	38

== Politics and administration ==
The town of Ciacova is administered by a mayor and a local council composed of 15 councilors. The mayor, Petru Filip, from the National Liberal Party, has been in office since 2008. As from the 2024 local elections, the local council has the following composition by political parties:

Party	Seats	Composition
National Liberal Party	7	
Social Democratic Party	6	
Save Romania Union	2	

== Culture ==
Ciacova is home to a House of Culture with a seating capacity of 250, as well as a performance hall that accommodates 350 spectators. Additionally, each of the town's constituent villages has its own cultural center. The municipal library holds a collection of 11,116 volumes. The Ciacova Museum, located in the former bank building dating from the 18th–19th centuries in the Fortress' Square, features exhibits including traditional costumes, household items, agricultural tools, and various historical artifacts.

== Education ==
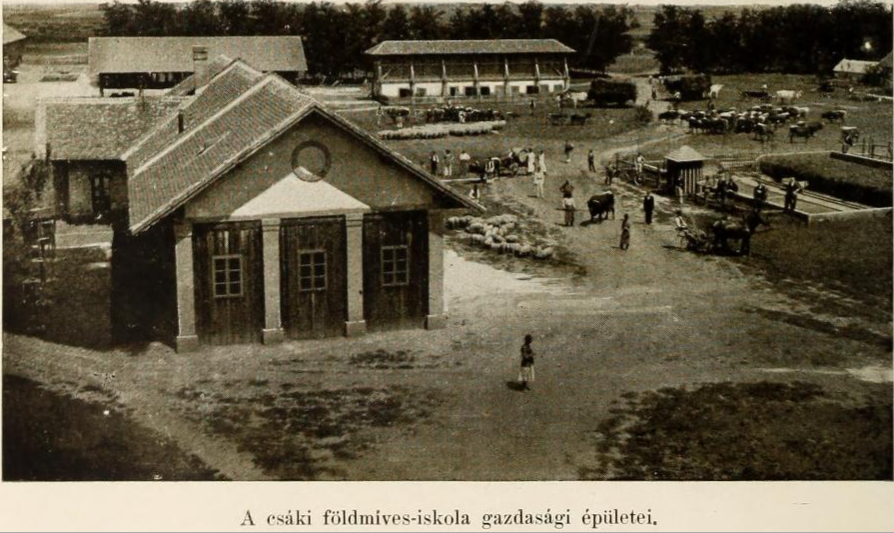
The agricultural school in 1914

Preschool education in Ciacova is offered through a kindergarten that operates both regular and extended programs. Similar kindergartens with regular programs are also available in the other villages within the town's administrative jurisdiction. Primary education is provided by affiliated institutions located in Ciacova, Obad, Macedonia, and Petroman. Secondary education, including middle and high school levels, is conducted at the Alexandru Mocioni Theoretical High School in Ciacova, which features a theoretical branch specializing in mathematics and computer science, as well as a vocational branch focused on agriculture. The school was established during the 1956–1957 academic year, with the first cohort admitted in the spring and autumn of 1956, under the direction of Rista Popovici.

== Healthcare ==
Ciacova is equipped with a permanent medical center that provides continuous emergency services, supported by a team of eight family physicians. Until 2011, the town operated a state hospital, originally constructed in 1935, which was subsequently acquired in 2020 by a private healthcare network.

== Economy ==
The economy has the characteristics of a small industrial-agricultural plain town. The light, textile and food industries are present here. Milling, fruit growing and animal husbandry are also developed.

== Transport ==
Access to Ciacova is facilitated by DJ693B, which spans nine kilometers and connects the town to European route E70. This major route enters Romania from Serbia at the Moravița border crossing and continues through Timișoara toward southern Romania and the capital, Bucharest. The four constituent villages are linked to Ciacova via local communal roads. The distances between Ciacova and the component villages are:

- Ciacova–Cebza – 7 km on DJ693B
- Ciacova–Macedonia – 7 km on DC196
- Ciacova–Obad – 3 km on DC197
- Ciacova–Petroman – 4 km on DC195

The street layout, 25 km long, is generally radial-concentric, with streets converging towards the central core, located in the northwestern part of the town.

Ciacova is served by three railway lines:

- Timișoara–Jebel–Stamora Moravița (main)
- Jebel–Ciacova–Giera (secondary)
- Timișoara–Peciu Nou–Cruceni (secondary)

== Twin towns ==
Ciacova is twinned with:

- (Italy) Masi Torello
- (France) Saint-Pardoux-la-Rivière

== Notable people ==
- Dositej Obradović (1742–1811), writer
- Spiridon Jovanović (d. 1855), chancellor
- Dimitrije Tirol (1793–1857), writer, grammarian, geographer and painter
- Stefan Popović (1798–1849), bishop
- Branko Tanazević (1876–1945), architect
- Milan Petrović (1879–1952), professor
- Zeno Coste (1907–1985), singer
- Emmerich Stoffel (1913–2008), politician
- Emilijan Čarnić (1914–1995), theologian and classical philologist
