= Ghilad =

- Commune
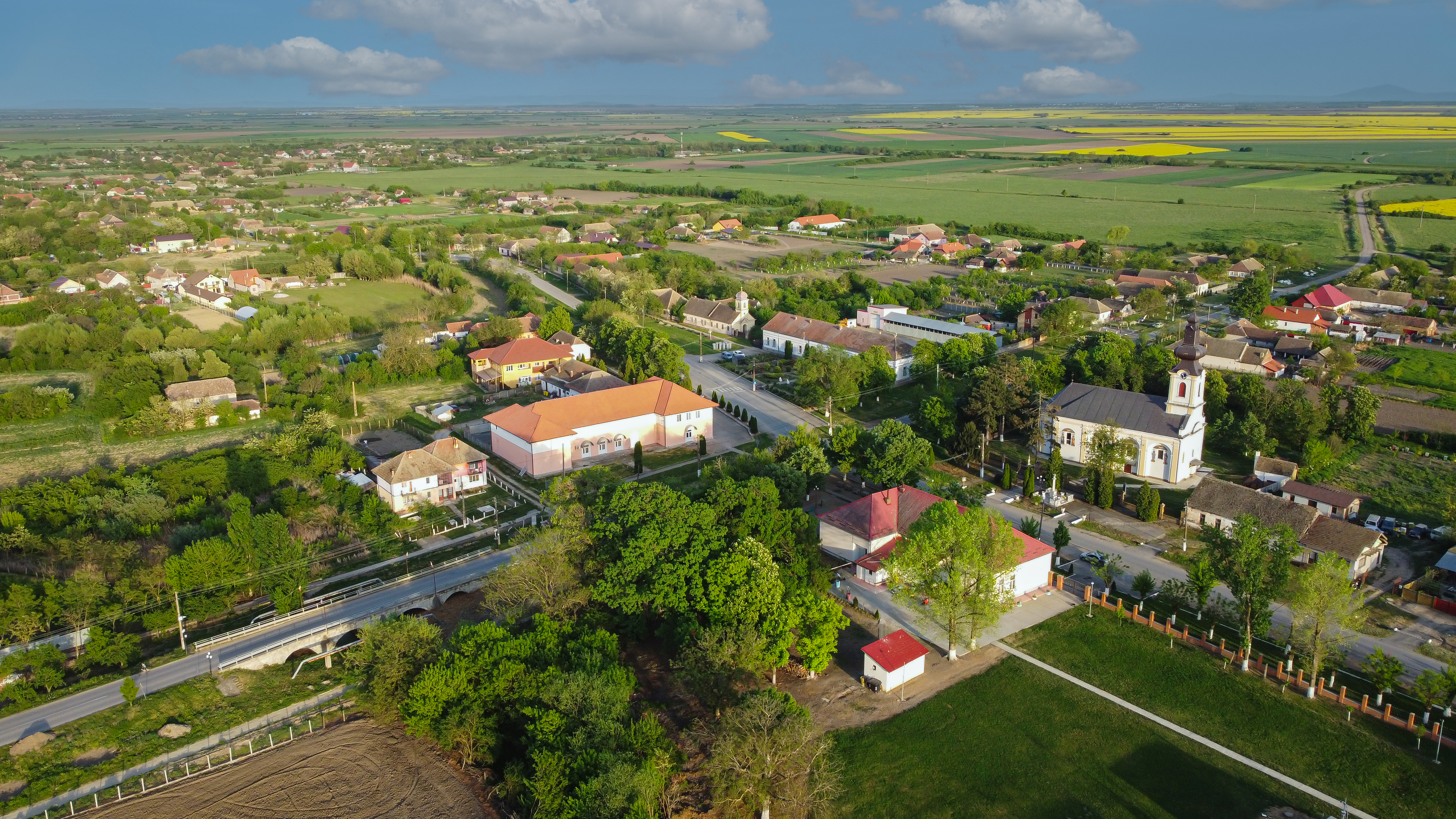
- The center of Ghilad village

- Location in Timiș County

- Location in Romania
- Coordinates: 45°28′N 21°9′E
- Country: Romania
- County: Timiș

Government
  - Mayor (2024–): Florin Tuhuț (PNL)
- Area: 114.27 km^{2} (44.12 sq mi)
- Population (2021-12-01): 2,017
  - Density: 17.65/km^{2} (45.72/sq mi)
- Time zone: UTC+02:00 (EET)
  - Summer (DST): UTC+03:00 (EEST)
- Postal code: 307112–307113
- Vehicle reg.: TM
- Website: www.comunaghilad.ro

Ghilad (German: Gilad; Banat Swabian: Kilatt; Hungarian: Gilád; Serbian: Гилад, romanized: Gilad) is a commune in Timiș County, Romania. It is composed of two villages, Gad and Ghilad (commune seat). These were part of the commune of Ciacova until 2004, when they were split off.

== Etymology ==
Etymologically, the name Ghilad is identified by Radu Sp. Popescu as having Hungarian origins, derived from Gylad, which in turn comes from the anthroponym Gy(u)la combined with the locative suffix -d. The toponym appears in various historical forms, including Pilad in Korabinsky's dictionary and Ghijad in 13th-century Greek Catholic documents.

== History ==
The first recorded mention of Ghilad dates from 1212, when Andrew II of Hungary donated Gyad to Terra Sebus, responsible for the transfer of possession being the prefect of Csanád, Nicolae Csáky. It was not mentioned in documents until the second half of the 16th century, then it is said that it was inhabited by Romanians, brought from Transylvania by Rami Pasha. In 1717, when the Austrians conquered Banat from the Turks, they conducted a census showing that the locality then called Donji Gilad/Доњи Гилад in Serbian had 100 houses, and a few kilometers away, the locality of Gornji Gilad/Горњи Гилад had 80 houses. Mercy's map from 1723–1726 shows that these two villages were separated by dense forests. Under Empress Maria Theresa, the population of the smaller Ghilad was moved to the larger village. By this time the first Germans had moved here, and in 1842 Hungarian families also settled here. A new wave of Hungarian and German settlers arrived here between 1856 and 1860, mostly from Krassó County. In the interwar period it was part of Plasa Ciacova, Timiș-Torontal County. Until 2004, Ghilad belonged to the commune of Ciacova (now a town), after which it was split off and together with the village of Gad it forms the commune of Ghilad.

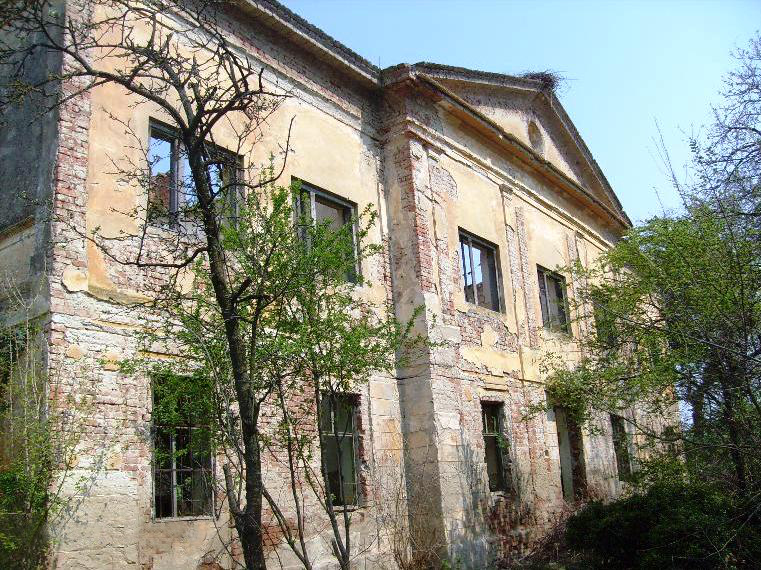
Gudenus Mansion in Gad

The first documentary mentions about Gad are the records of the papal tithes from 1332 to 1337. Gad is still much older. Traces of Bronze Age habitation have been discovered on the territory of the village. Oral tradition claims that on this place Duke Glad faced the Hungarians of Tühütüm, around 895. The village was established after the withdrawal of the armies, being named in honor of the duke. An important event for the village took place in 1788, when Emperor Joseph II and Prince Francis, on their way to Belgrade (where a strong Turkish siege was taking place), stopped in Gad, in the house of Petru Miloș. For his hospitality, Petru Miloș was given a purebred stallion from Mezőhegyes. Hungarian historians say that the Serbs from Gad were brought from Montenegro, without mentioning when they came. The coexistence of Romanians with Serbs dates back to ancient times and was also linked to the fact that the two Orthodox communities were in hierarchical communion until 1924. Only in 1929 did Romanians build their own church. In the 19th century it had several owners. The last of these were Hugo and Bela Gudenus, whose mansion (Gudenus Mansion, a historical monument) has been preserved to this day.

== Demographics ==
Ethnic composition (2021)
1. Romanians (81.1%)
2. Roma (7.83%)
3. Hungarians (1.63%)
4. Unknown (8.57%)
5. Others (0.86%)
Religious composition (2021)
1. Orthodox (84.2%)
2. Roman Catholics (3.52%)
3. Pentecostals (2.42%)
4. Unknown (8.92%)
5. Others (0.96%)

Ghilad had a population of 2,017 inhabitants at the 2021 census, down 2.94% from the 2011 census. Most inhabitants are Romanians (81.11%), larger minorities being represented by Roma (7.83%) and Hungarians (1.63%). For 8.57% of the population, ethnicity is unknown. By religion, most inhabitants are Orthodox (84.18%), but there are also minorities of Roman Catholics (3.52%) and Pentecostals (2.42%). For 8.92% of the population, religious affiliation is unknown.

Census		Ethnic composition
Year	Population	Romanians	Hungarians	Germans	Roma	Serbs
1880	3,964	2,459	433	496	–	537
1890	4,459	2,632	523	657	–	575
1900	4,912	2,800	863	647	–	559
1910	5,043	2,971	884	439	–	680
1920	4,397	2,676	745	405	–	–
1930	4,791 (Note: Including data on Fodorhaza's population. It was nevertheless split off in 1956.)	2,847	815	506	91	520
1941	4,975	3,024	834	507	–	–
1956	3,771	–	–	–	–	–
1966	3,599	2,577	484	194	75	265
1977	2,779	1,948	397	140	144	145
1992	2,067	1,503	252	68	143	74
2002	1,984	1,444	207	58	186	57
2011	2,078	1,586	161	47	176	24
2021	2,017	1,636	33	3	158	11

== Politics and administration ==
The commune of Ghilad is administered by a mayor and a local council composed of 11 councilors. The mayor, Florin Tuhuț, from the National Liberal Party, has been in office since 2024. As from the 2024 local elections, the local council has the following composition by political parties:

Party	Seats	Composition
National Liberal Party	4	
Social Democratic Party	4	
Alliance for the Union of Romanians	2	
Save Romania Union–People's Movement Party–Force of the Right	1	
