= Josephinian Land Survey =

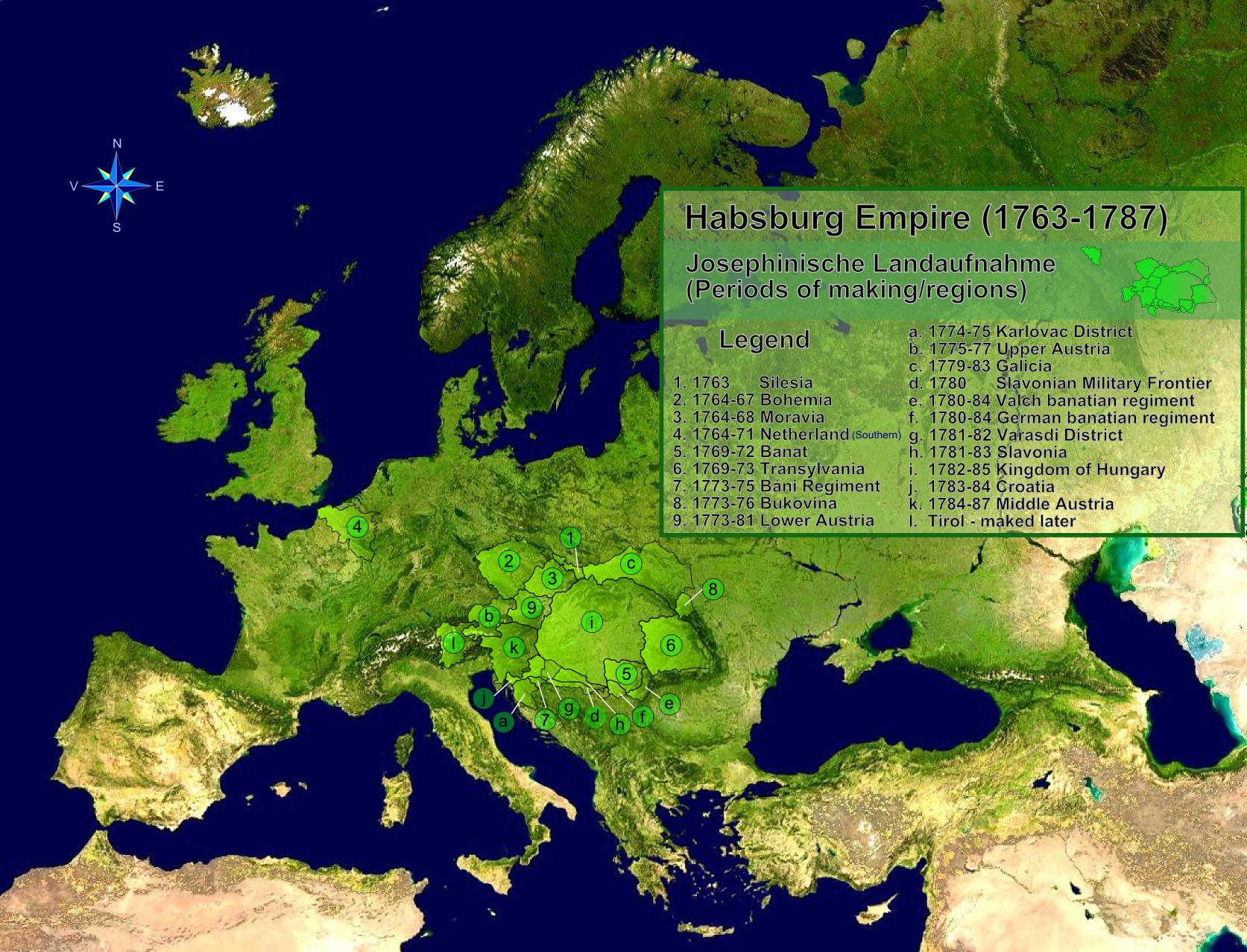
Distribution and time periods of the Josephinian Land Survey

The Josephinian Land Survey (German: Josephinische Landesaufnahme) was the first comprehensive land survey and mapping of the Habsburg Empire. The survey was ordered by Holy Roman Empress Maria Theresa after Austria's defeat in the Seven Years' War. It was conducted from 1763 to 1787, concluding in the reign of Holy Roman Emperor Joseph II. The maps are currently stored in the National Archives of Austria.
