= Jebel, Timiș =

Jebel
- Commune
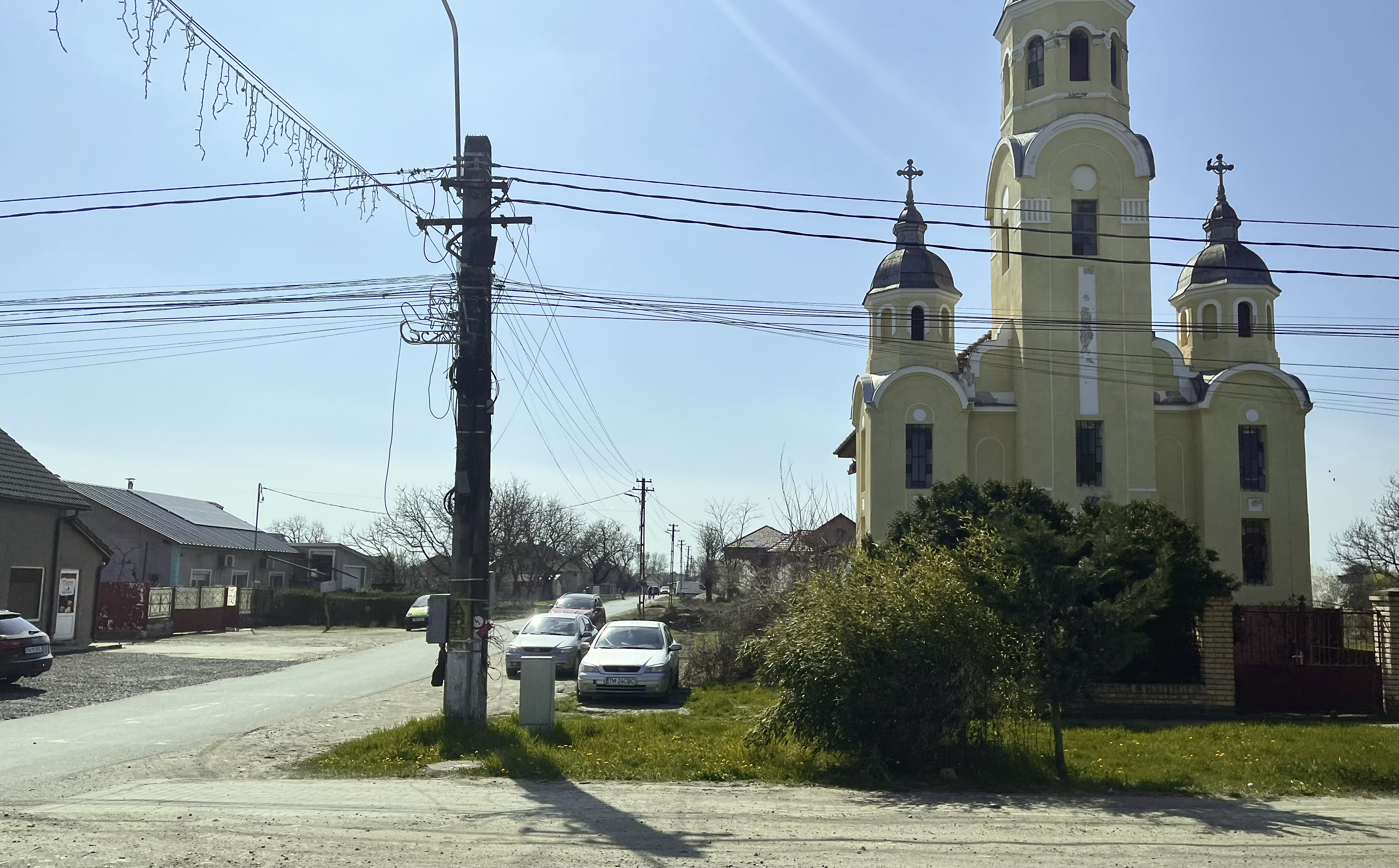

- Location in Timiș County

- Location in Romania
- Coordinates: 45°33′N 21°13′E
- Country: Romania
- County: Timiș

Government
  - Mayor (2020–): Dan-Ciprian Vatriș (PNL)
- Area: 73 km^{2} (28 sq mi)
- Population (2021-12-01): 3,781
  - Density: 52/km^{2} (130/sq mi)
- Time zone: UTC+02:00 (EET)
  - Summer (DST): UTC+03:00 (EEST)
- Postal code: 307235
- Vehicle reg.: TM
- Website: www.primariajebel.ro

Jebel (Hungarian: Széphely; German: Schebel; Serbian: Жебељ, romanized: Žebelj) is a commune in Timiș County, Romania. It is composed of a single village, Jebel, and also included the village of Pădureni until 2004, when it was split off to form a separate commune.

== History ==
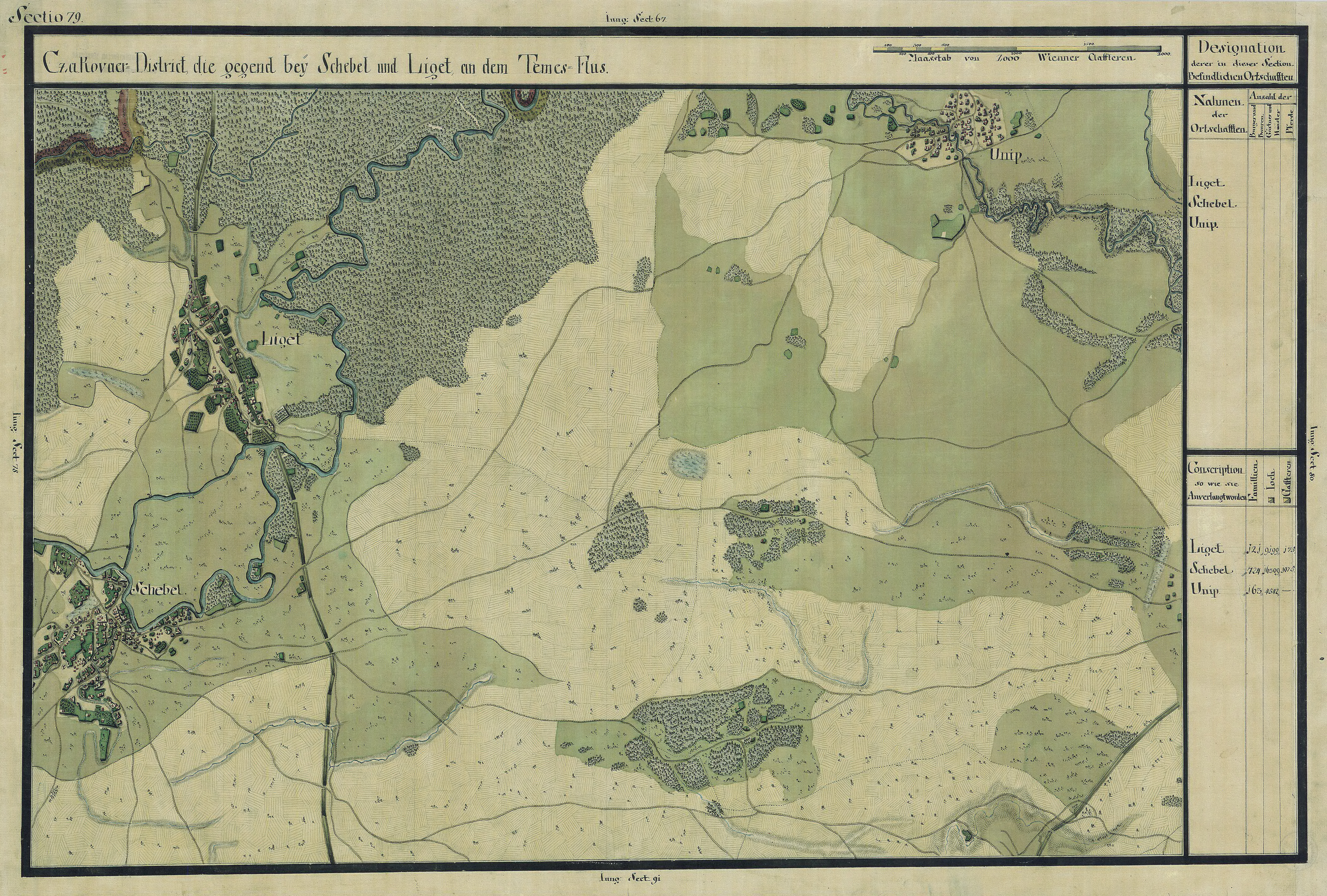
Jebel (Schebel) in the Josephinische Landesaufnahme of 1769–1772

Jebel was first mentioned in papal tithes in 1334 under the name Zephel. In 1401, the local nobleman Nicolae Trentul had a fortress here, which had to be demolished later, and in 1425 the fortress was rebuilt in the nearby forest. At that time it had the right to organize fairs and owned several floating mills on Timiș River. In 1479 it was sold to Miklós and Jakab Bánffy.

Turkish traveler Evliya Çelebi, who has passed through Asia, Africa and Europe, noted various information related to the journeys he had made, describing it in ten volumes. In 1660, he, together with Ali, the Turk in charge of Timișoara region, visits Jebel and describes the village as being inhabited by Christian Romanians, as all the villages of Banat. The Jebel area, under the Turkish occupation, is represented as having large reserves of grain, livestock, forests and vast stretches of fruit trees. In 1717, after the conquest of Banat by the Austrians, the first census was organized, the village of Schebell being registered with 200 houses. Under the new administration the locality developed, and in 1761 it also had a post office. In 1752 the Orthodox church was built, which replaced the old wooden church and around which the village later developed. Not being colonized as intensely as other villages, it was for a long time the largest Romanian and Orthodox commune in Banat, with five parishes. During the Revolutions of 1848, the Serbs rebel and cause serious damage to the village. As a result, the inhabitants of Jebel rose against the Serbs, joining the hosts of Lajos Kossuth. In 1863, due to a severe drought, the village suffered from famine. In 1869, it experienced heavy flooding for several days.

On 4 June 1920, Banat was divided into three parts as a result of the Treaty of Trianon. The largest, eastern part, to which Jebel also belongs, fell to the Kingdom of Romania. In the context of World War II, on 19 September 1939, the talks between the Romanian Foreign Minister Grigore Gafencu and his Yugoslav counterpart Aleksandar Cincar-Marković on the establishment of a neutral zone in the Balkans were held in a carriage at the Jebel train station.

== Demographics ==
Ethnic composition (2021)
1. Romanians (83.8%)
2. Roma (4.46%)
3. Unknown (11.4%)
4. Others (0.33%)
Religious composition (2021)
1. Orthodox (71.5%)
2. Pentecostals (12.3%)
3. Baptists (1.50%)
4. Roman Catholics (1.29%)
5. Unknown (12.1%)
6. Others (1.06%)
7. Irreligious, atheists and agnostics (0.23%)

Jebel had a population of 3,781 inhabitants at the 2021 census, up 5.5% from the 2011 census. Most inhabitants are Romanians (83.76%), with a minority of Roma (4.46%). For 11.45% of the population, ethnicity is unknown. By religion, most inhabitants are Orthodox (71.46%), but there are also minorities of Pentecostals (12.35%), Baptists (1.5%) and Roman Catholics (1.29%). For 12.11% of the population, religious affiliation is unknown.

Census		Ethnic composition
Year	Population	Romanians	Hungarians	Germans	Roma	Serbs
1880	3,286	2,764	314	163	–	31
1890	3,947 (Note: Including Iosif, a Romanian-Hungarian village that became part of Liebling commune after 1954)	3,077	509	315	–	42
1900	3,993	3,088	565	302	–	19
1910	4,125	3,162	660	262	–	11
1920	3,862	2,896	679	239	–	–
1930	3,630	2,854	516	199	14	17
1941	3,769	2,907	551	273	–	–
1956	3,327	–	–	–	–	–
1966	4,073	3,727	138	159	9	20
1977	3,962	3,697	145	89	15	5
1992	3,672	3,333	70	74	170	11
2002	3,727	3,445	55	24	180	10
2011	3,584	3,164	41	9	145	15
2021	3,781	3,167	3	–	169	–

== Politics and administration ==
The commune of Jebel is administered by a mayor and a local council composed of 13 councilors. The mayor, Dan-Ciprian Vatriș, from the National Liberal Party, has been in office since 2020. As from the 2024 local elections, the local council has the following composition by political parties:

Party	Seats	Composition
National Liberal Party	9	
Social Democratic Party	3	
Alliance for the Union of Romanians	1	

== Education ==
The first school in Jebel was established in 1750. In 1763 the archpriest Martin Șuboni (1716–1763) donated his own house to function as a school. The confessional school functioned in his house until 1919, when it passed into the state administration. The current school in Jebel is named after the archpriest. The building was located in the courtyard of the Orthodox church. The current school was built between 1937–1941.

== Healthcare ==
In Jebel there are two dispensaries, two pharmacies and a veterinary office. A psychiatric hospital has been operating here since 1962.
