= Clopodia =

- Location within Romania

Location
- Country: Romania
- Counties: Timiș County
- Villages: Clopodia

Physical characteristics
- Mouth: Moravița
  - location: Percosova
  - coordinates: 45.3215°N 21.3709°E
- Length: 17 km (11 mi)
- Basin size: 75 km^{2} (29 sq mi)

Basin features
- Progression: Moravița→ Bârzava→ Timiș→ Danube→ Black Sea

The Clopodia (Hungarian: Klopodia-patak) is a left tributary of the river Moravița in Romania. It discharges into the Moravița near Percosova. Its length is 17 km (11 mi) and its basin size is 75 km^{2} (29 sq mi).
