= Fizeș =

Fizeș may refer to several places in Romania:

- Fizeș, a village in Berzovia Commune, Caraș-Severin County
- Fizeș, a village in Băița Commune, Hunedoara County
- Fizeș, a village in Sâg Commune, Sălaj County
- Fizeș (Bârzava), a river in Caraș-Severin County
- Fizeș (Someș), a river in Cluj County
