= Semnița =

- Location within Romania
- Native name: Șemița (Romanian)

Location
- Country: Romania
- Counties: Timiș County
- Villages: Lățunaș, Jamu Mare, Gherman

Physical characteristics
- Mouth: Moravița
  - coordinates: 45.2853°N 21.3056°E
- Length: 23 km (14 mi)
- Basin size: 101 km^{2} (39 sq mi)

Basin features
- Progression: Moravița→ Bârzava→ Timiș→ Danube→ Black Sea

The Semnița is a left tributary of the river Moravița in Romania. It discharges into the Moravița in Dejan. Its length is 23 km (14 mi) and its basin size is 101 km^{2} (39 sq mi).
