= Moravița (disambiguation) =

Moravița may refer to:

- Moravița, a commune in Timiș County, Romania
- Moravița (Bârzava), a river in Romania and Serbia, tributary of the Bârzava
- Moravița (upper Bârzava), a small river in Romania, tributary of the Bârzava
- Moravitsa (Targovishte)
- Moravitsa (Vratsa)
