= Birdanca =

- Location within Romania

Location
- Country: Romania
- Counties: Timiș County
- Towns: Deta

Physical characteristics
- Mouth: Bârzava
  - location: near Denta
  - coordinates: 45.3479°N 21.1919°E
- Length: 22 km (14 mi)
- Basin size: 38 km^{2} (15 sq mi)

Basin features
- Progression: Bârzava→ Timiș→ Danube→ Black Sea

The Birdanca is a right tributary of the river Bârzava in Romania. It discharges into the Bârzava near Denta. Its length is 22 km (14 mi) and its basin size is 38 km^{2} (15 sq mi).
