= Smida River =

Smida River may refer to:

- Smida, a tributary of the Vornic in Caraș-Severin County, Romania
- Smida, a tributary of the Muncel in Hunedoara County, Romania
- Smida, a tributary of the Ața in Neamț County, Romania
