= Bârzava (Timiș) =

Bârzava Brzava (Брзава)
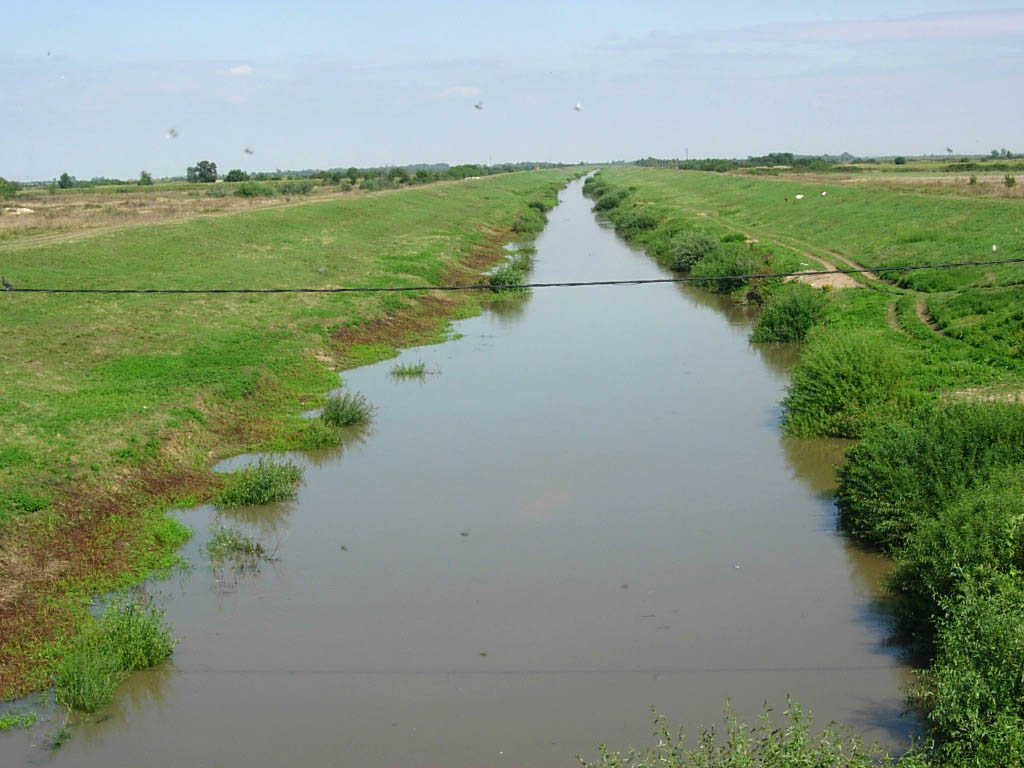
- The Brzava near Konak, Serbia

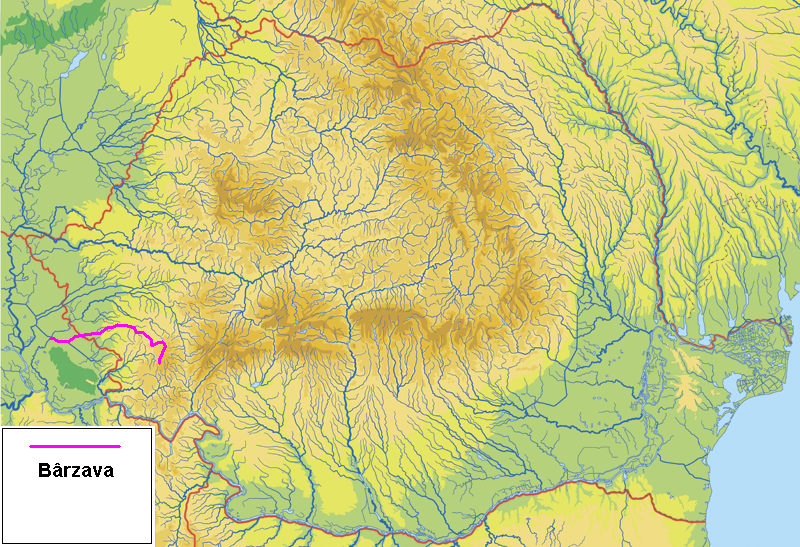

Location
- Country: Romania, Serbia
- Region: Caraș-Severin, Timiș, Vojvodina
- Towns: Reșița, Bocșa

Physical characteristics
- Source: Semenic Mountains, Romania
- Mouth: Timiș/Tamiš
  - location: near Botoš, Serbia
  - coordinates: 45°17′59″N 20°38′46″E
- Length: 166 km (103 mi)
- Basin size: 1,190 km^{2} (460 sq mi)

Basin features
- Progression: Timiș→ Danube→ Black Sea

The Bârzava or Brzava (Romanian: Bârzava, Serbian: Брзава / Brzava, Hungarian: Berzava, German: Bersau) is a river in Romania and Serbia. The Bârzava is part of the Black Sea drainage basin and flows into the river Timiș (or Tamiš). It is 166 km long and has a drainage area of 1,190 km².

== Name ==
The Romanian forms Bârzava and Bêrzava (last form still used in 19th century newspapers) are of Slavic origin and mean "birch river", from the Slavic "breza", meaning "birch" (see also Breaza; cf. Latvian river names Bērzupe and Bārzupe, i.e. 'birch river'). Alternatively, the name could also come from the Serbian "brz", meaning 'quick', thus meaning "the quick river" in Slavic languages.

== Romania ==
The Bârzava springs out in the Semenic Mountains part of the Carpathian Mountains, western Romania, east of the city of Reșița. The river runs to the northeast, close to the Piatra Goznei peak and through the village of Vâliug, reaching the northernmost part of the Semenic mountains, where it turns to the northwest. It runs through the cities of Reșița and Bocșa the largest settlements on its course, and continues next to the villages of Berzovia, and Șoșdea, where the Bârzava leaves the mountain region of Banat for the lower western plain. This is also where the river turns to the southwest, spills in several parallel streams and flows next to the villages of Sculea, Gătaia, Sângeorge, Rovinița Mare and Denta. From this point, until its confluence into the Tamiš, the Bârzava's river bed is channeled. After it flows next to the village of Partoș, it forms the Romanian-Serbian border for a few kilometers and after the course of 127 km through Romania, the Bârzava enters the Serbian province of Vojvodina near the hamlet of Markovićevo.

== Serbia ==
The Brzava runs next to the villages of Konak and Banatska Dubica, where it becomes part of the largest canal system in Serbia, Canal Danube-Tisa-Danube. The only remaining settlement on the river is the village of Jarkovac, before it empties into the Tamiš, south of the village of Botoš. The river's complete 39 km course through Serbia is statistically classified as a Canal Brzava, but it is not navigable.

== Tributaries ==
The following rivers are tributaries to the river Bârzava (from source to mouth):

Left: Crivaia Mare, Grindieș, Văliug, Lișcovu Mare, Râul Alb, Secu, Sodol, Doman, Bârzăvița, Moravița (upper Bârzava), Copăș, Moscădin, Fizeș, Boruga, Gorova, Ciopa, Moravița

Right: Berzovița, Alibeg, Pârâul Băilor Mari, Bolnovăț, Gozna, Izvoru Rău, Breazova, Groposu, Pietrosu, Țerova, Cremeni, Vornic, Stoiconic, Birdanca

== Settlements located near the river ==
In Romania: Văliug, Reșița, Bocșa, Berzovia, Gătaia, Denta

In Serbia: Markovićevo, Konak, Banatska Dubica, Jarkovac
