= Kornélia Hollósy =

Hungarian soprano (1827–1890)

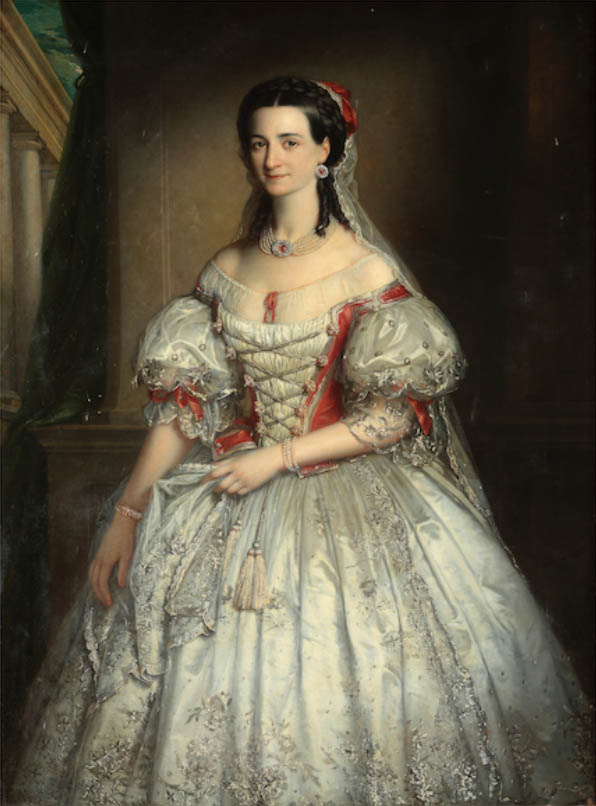
- Portrait painting of Hollósy by Mihály Kovács

Background information
- Born: Kornélia Julianna Klára Korbuly; 13 April 1827; Gherteniș, Banat
- Died: 10 February 1890 (aged 62) Dombegyház, Békés, Hungary
- Genre: Opera
- Spouse: József Lonovics (m. 1852)

Kornélia Julianna Klára Hollósy (née Korbuly, Armenian: Կոռնելիա Հոլոշի, 13 April 1827 – 10 February 1890) was a Hungarian coloratura soprano opera singer, who was known as the "Hungarian Nightingale."

== Early life and education ==
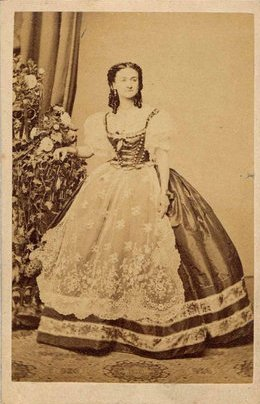
Hollósy photographed by György Mayer, 1860

Hollósy was born on 13 April 1827 in Gherteniș, Banat. She was the eleventh and last child of Bogdán Korbuly and Mária Magdolna Csausz.

Hollósy's ancestors were from the area of Szamosújvár. Her Armenian father was a landowner who received a certificate of Hungarian nobility after purchasing the Gertenyes manor from the treasury in 1832 and was permitted to change the family surname to the more Hungarian-sounding Hollósy. After her mother died in childbirth, Hollósy was raised by her stepmother Rebeka Lászlóffy, who was also of Armenian origin.

Hollósy was educated by the nuns of Temesvár for four years, where the singing teacher of the convent school noticed her beautiful soprano voice and recommended that she pursue a career in music. She then trained as an opera singer for two years in the Austrian towns of Timisoara and Vienna under Matteo Salvi, as well as in Turin, Italy, under Giovanni Battista Lamperti, despite opposition from her father. She was accompanied by a female relative.

== Career ==
Hollósy debuted in 1845 in Corfu, aged 18, singing as Elvira in Italian composer Giuseppe Verdi's Ernani. After her maternal uncle organised a guest performance for her, Hollósy made her Hungarian debut in Pest on 23 July 1846 then performed in Italian composer Gaetano Donizetti's opera Linda di Chamounix.

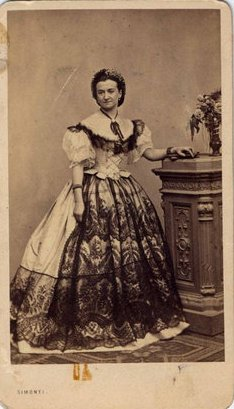
Hollósy photographed in 1860

Hollósy was contracted by the National Theatre as a "lyric singer" from August 1846 and as her popularity grew she became known as the "Hungarian Nightingale." She also became a rival of fellow soprano Róza Schodel. She was one of the Hungarian composer Ferenc Erkel's favourite singers and he adapted a new part for her in his opera about the Hungarian nobleman and soldier László Hunyadi. Hollósy performed as Melinda in the 1861 premiere of Erkel's nationalist opera Bánk bán.

Hollósy also performed for charitable causes. In October 1846, she participated in a concert given by Franz Liszt for the benefit of the József Orphanage and in 1858 she sang at a concert given by the Pester Women's Charitable Society (Hungarian: Pesti Jótékony Nőegylet) in aid of a local hospital. She was also a founding member of the Pest-Buda Hangászegyesület (music school).

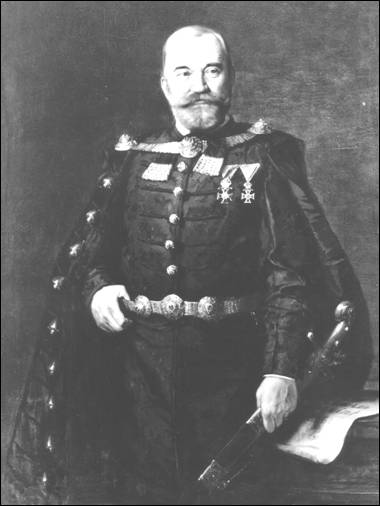
Hollósy 's husband József Lonovics

When Hungarian revolutionary and statesman Lajos Kossuth gave a speech during the Hungarian Revolution of 1848, Hollósy was among a delegation of 18 women who presented him with a bouquet of roses. In March 1850, Hollósy's brother, a captain of the Hungarian National Guard, was sentenced to death. Through her intercession, his sentence was commuted to imprisonment.

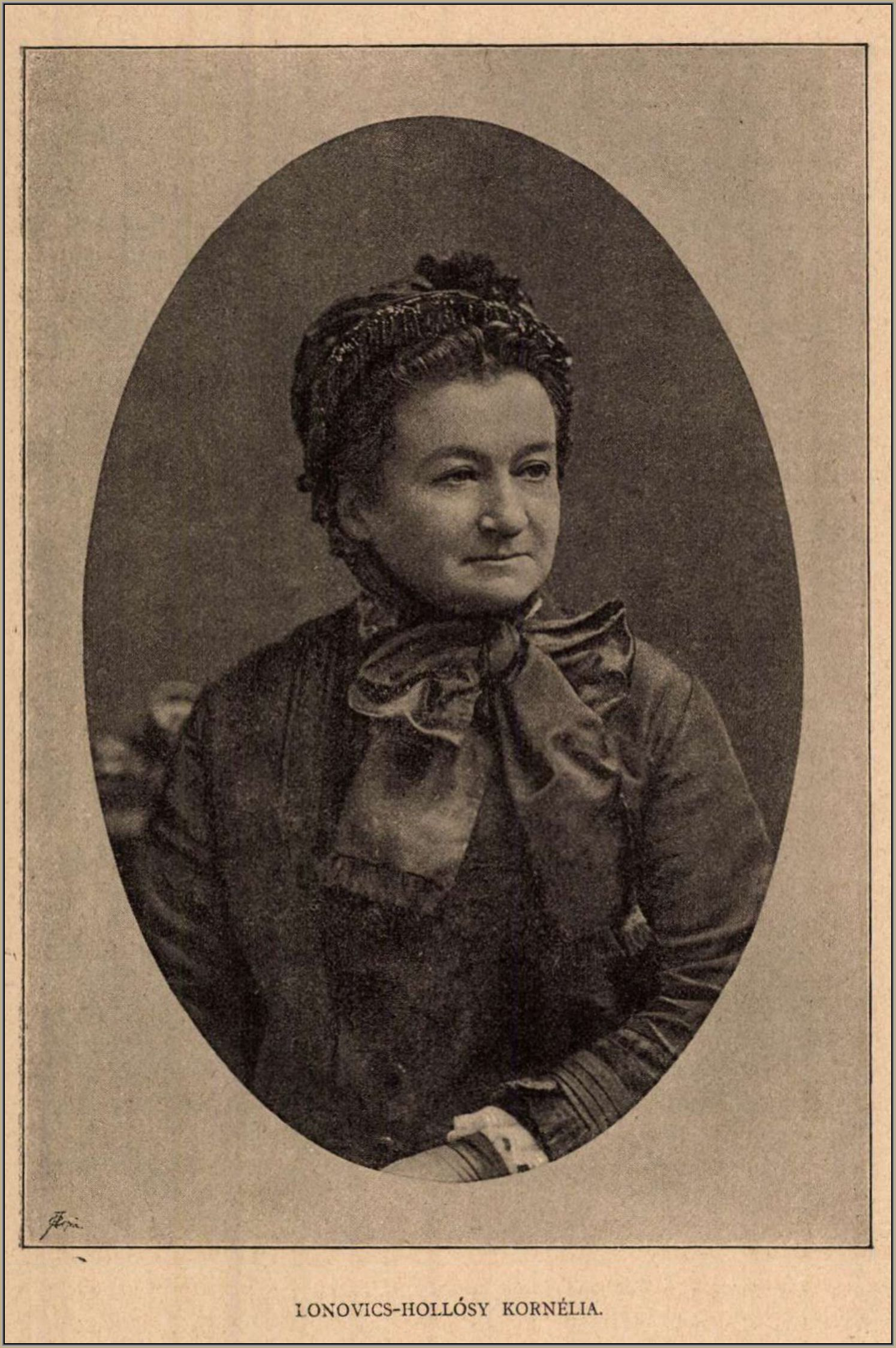
Hollósy c. 1889

Hollósy became engaged to Hungarian nobleman, lawyer and politician József Lonovics [hu]. After her engagement, she left the National Theatre and undertook in a foreign tour. She performed five times at the Vienna Court Opera, where Habsburg Emperor Franz Joseph I attended one of her performances, and for a year in Warsaw. She married József in April 1852 and they had two sons together.

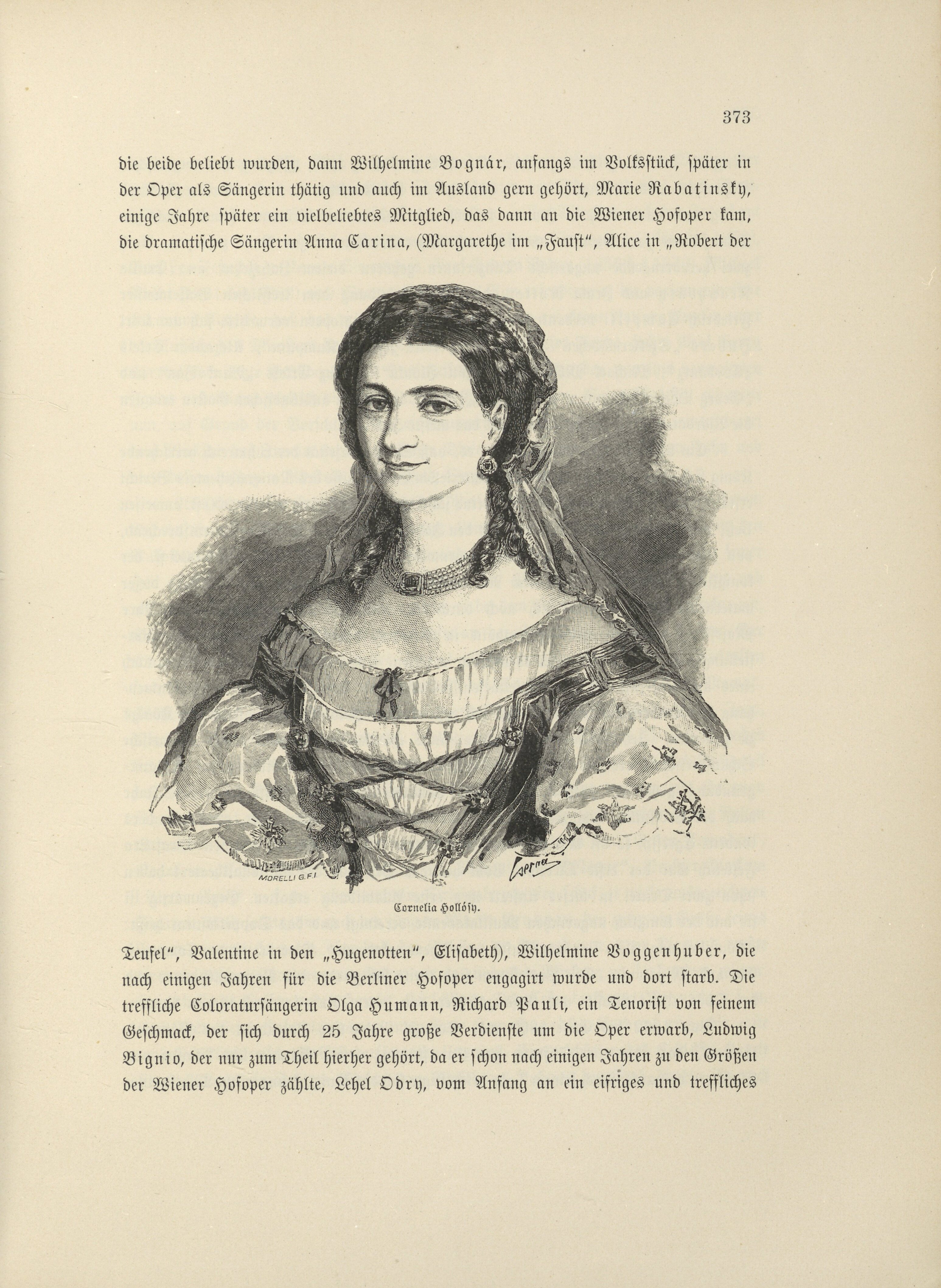
Hollósy in Der osterreichisch-ungarische Monarchie in Wort und Bild, 1893

In 1854, Hollósy travelled to Budapest to hear a performance by Swedish soprano Jenny Lind, and while there personally negotiated her return to the National Theatre. After her return in 1855, she sang in thirty operas, while living in Wenckheim Place [hu] on Pest University Square. From 1862 to 1863, Hollósy was a guest performed in Bucharest.

== Later life ==
Hollósy retired in 1862, and in 1864 she and her family moved Dombegyház. In 1879, her husband József was elected lord of Csanád. Hollósy taught sheet music to local children.

In 1865, Hollósy returned to the stage for a last performance in honour of the 25th anniversary of the Pest-Buda Hangászegyesület, premiering Liszt's oratorio The Legend of St. Elizabeth about Elizabeth of Hungary.

== Death and legacy ==
Hollósy died on 10 February 1890 in Dombegyház, Békés, Kingdom of Hungary, aged 62. She was a victim of the 1889–1890 flu pandemic. Hollósy's granddaughter, a six-year-old child also named Kornélia after her grandmother, also fell ill during the pandemic.

Hungarian poet János Arany wrote a poem in her honour. She is also commemorated by a bronze statue in Csanád, originally erected in 1903.
