= Gârliște River =

Gârliște River may refer to:

- Gârliște River (Caraș)
- Gârliște River (Bârzava)
