= Ciopa =

- Location within Romania

Location
- Country: Romania
- Counties: Timiș County

Physical characteristics
- Mouth: Bârzava
  - location: Rovinița Mare
  - coordinates: 45.3807°N 21.2978°E
- Length: 13 km (8.1 mi)
- Basin size: 30 km^{2} (12 sq mi)

Basin features
- Progression: Bârzava→ Timiș→ Danube→ Black Sea

The Ciopa is a left tributary of the river Bârzava in Romania. It flows into the Bârzava in Rovinița Mare. Its length is 13 km (8.1 mi) and its basin size is 30 km^{2} (12 sq mi).
