= Valea Baciului (disambiguation) =

Valea Baciului may refer to the following rivers in Romania:

- Valea Baciului, a tributary of the Sodol in Caraș-Severin County
- Baciu (Olt), in Covasna County, Romania
- Valea Baciului, in Constanța County, Romania
