= Țerova (disambiguation) =

Țerova may refer to the following places in Romania:

- Țerova, a tributary of the Bârzava in Caraș-Severin County
- Țerova, a tributary of the Gelug in Caraș-Severin County
- Țerova, a village in the municipality Reșița, Caraș-Severin County
