= Fizeș (Bârzava) =

- Location within Romania

Location
- Country: Romania
- Counties: Caraș-Severin County
- Villages: Doclin, Tirol, Fizeș

Physical characteristics
- Mouth: Bârzava
  - coordinates: 45.4439°N 21.5381°E
- Length: 26 km (16 mi)
- Basin size: 74 km^{2} (29 sq mi)

Basin features
- Progression: Bârzava→ Timiș→ Danube→ Black Sea

The Fizeș (Hungarian: Füzes) is a left tributary of the river Bârzava in Romania. It discharges into the Bârzava near Șoșdea. Its length is 26 km (16 mi) and its basin size is 74 km^{2} (29 sq mi).

== Hydronymy ==
The Hungarian name means "willow-bed".
