= Cornis =

Cornis or Corniș may refer to:

- Corniș River, a Romanian river, tributary of the Moravița
- Cornis Engineering, a racing car constructor which attempted to qualify for the 1959 Indianapolis 500

== See also ==
- Cornice, an architectural element
