= Deta, Romania =

Deta
- Town
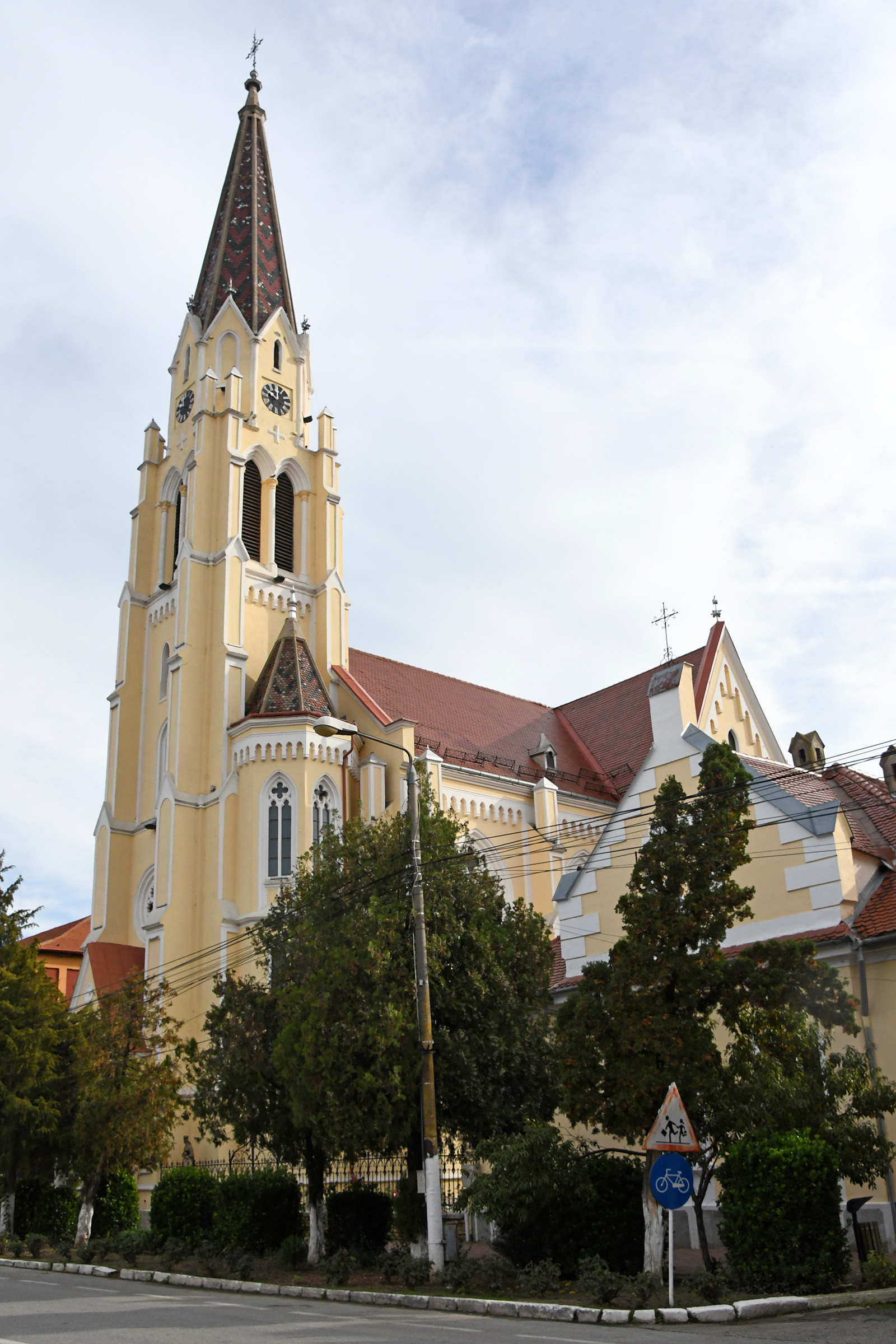
- The Roman Catholic church

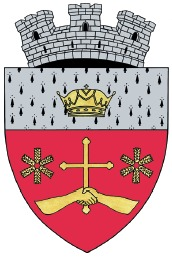
- Coat of arms

- Location in Timiș County

- Location in Romania
- Coordinates: 45°24′8″N 21°15′3″E
- Country: Romania
- County: Timiș

Government
  - Mayor (2024–2028): Petru Roman (PSD)
- Area: 32.74 km^{2} (12.64 sq mi)
- Population (2021-12-01): 5,670
  - Density: 173/km^{2} (449/sq mi)
- Time zone: UTC+02:00 (EET)
  - Summer (DST): UTC+03:00 (EEST)
- Postal code: 305200–305201
- Vehicle reg.: TM
- Website: www.detatm.ro

Deta (Hungarian: Detta; German: Detta; Serbian: Дета, romanized: Deta; Banat Bulgarian: Dédva) is a town in Timiș County, Romania. It administers a single village, Opatița.

== Geography ==
Deta is located in the low plain of Bârzava and is crossed by the Birdanca, a tributary of the Bârzava which during flood periods acts as a valve for it. Deta borders Voiteg to the north, Birda to the northeast and east, Denta to the south and Banloc to the west.

The territory of the locality is dominated by the temperate continental climate. As a share, the largest influence is the maritime air masses from the west, with a high degree of humidity, then the subtropical ones from the Mediterranean and the continental ones from the east. Due to these climatic characteristics, winters are not very cold, summers are hot, and springs and autumns are quite short. The average annual temperature is between 10 and 11 °C (50 and 52 °F), while the maximum reaches 40 °C (104 °F).

The predominant form of relief is the plain, favorable to agriculture. The grassy and forest-steppe vegetation predominates around the town. The woody vegetation is characteristic of lowland areas. The fauna is predominated by rodents; there are also hares, deer, fallow deer, wild boars, foxes and squirrels. Among the birds found here are pheasants, northern goshawks, skylarks, little owls, tits, nightingales, starlings, wild ducks and wild geese.

== History ==
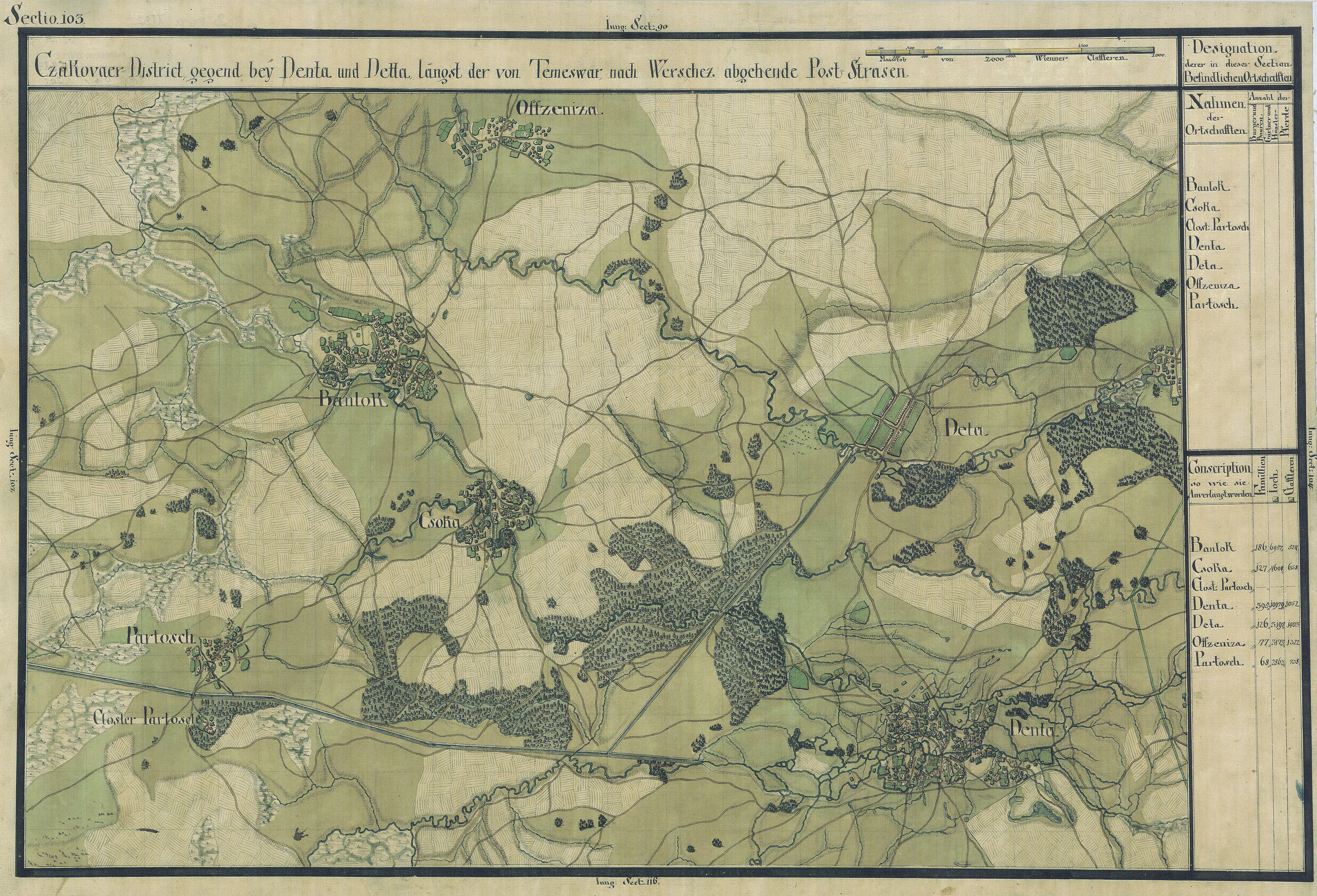
Deta on the Josephinische Landesaufnahme of 1769–1772

Based on the archaeological evidence, the existence of this settlement has been established since the Neolithic, later evolving in the other historical eras (Bronze Age, Iron Age, Daco-Roman period and migration period). During the Roman period, the Roman castrum Potula existed here. The first recorded mention of Deta takes place in 1360, under the name of Ded, being the possession of nobleman Johannes de Deed, from which derives the current name. In 1411 and 1427, the locality is recorded with the names Ded and Kyzded ("Little Ded"), respectively. During the Ottoman domination, it declines. In his travel journals from 1660–1664, Turkish traveler Evliya Çelebi, who was visiting Banat, states that Deta was inhabited by Romanians.

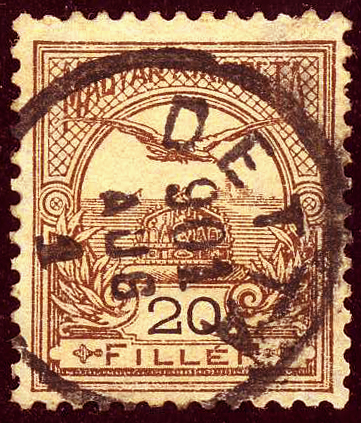
DETTA postmark on a Kingdom of Hungary stamp in 1901

From 1724, when the colonization of Banat by the Germans from Bavaria and Alsace/Lorraine began, the locality was reborn, its name being transformed into Detta, after the old name Ded. In the same year, the first Roman Catholic church was built and the official registration of baptisms, deaths and marriages began (1725). Colonization began in 1737 and lasted until 1794, and in addition to the Germans, 21 Italian families from Milan area were colonized in 1763. The first colony consisted of a few houses on the present-day main street and up to the old Bellavista Hotel. At that time, the Birda stream was the border of the settlement. At first the life of the colony was extremely harsh: the plague epidemic of 1738 quickly decimated the population. Until 1751 the locality was under military administration and developed less. It was only after it came under civilian administration, initially subordinated to Denta, that it was able to develop. The state organized colonization at its own expense.

As the climate was very favorable for the rice plant, the state brought in specialized Italian settlers who re-established rice fields here (a few decades ago, Count Mercy had already tried to develop this crop, but due to epidemics they had been abandoned). From that period, the Italian Arizi and Timary families became famous, with special merits in rice cultivation. At the same time, the growth of silkworms was stimulated, an activity that the locals practiced with skill.

In 1810, Deta is elevated to the rank of market town, until the end of the 19th century, by Emperor Francis I of Austria, due to the development it experiences in agriculture, trade, animal husbandry and craftsmanship. The opening of the Timișoara–Baziaș railway, which passed through Deta, in 1858, created favorable conditions for trade in grain and animals.

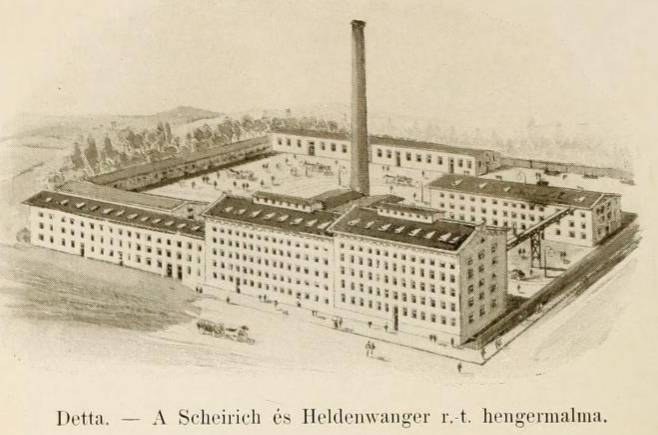
The cylinder mill in 1914

In 1867, after the incorporation of Banat into Hungary, Plasa Deta was established, with 13 communes, which belonged to Temes County. At the same time, it is recognized as an important economic center. It experiences a significant urban development; schools and institutions are built, sewerage works are carried out, sidewalks are put in and the telephone is introduced (1899). The Bellavista Hotel was built in the 19th century, a meeting place for Romanian and Serbian townspeople in the area. In 1902, the power plant was built and electric lighting was introduced.

During World War I, 200 locals died in the fighting, for which two monuments were erected in Antoniu Kratzer Park and near the town museum. It was occupied by the Serbian army between 1918 and 1919.

In Ghidul Banatului, edited by Emil Grădinariu and Ion Stoia-Udrea in 1936, Deta was described as follows:

Beautiful and well-kept small town, with well-maintained streets, paved sidewalks, in the center having a number of remarkable buildings, such as the Roman Catholic church, the town hall, the Bellavista hotel and café, etc. It is the seat of the praetorship of the same name and is a very important industrial center. It has 4,070 inhabitants, mostly Germans, then Romanians and a few Hungarians and Serbs.

In January 1945, the deportation of over 1,600 ethnic Germans—men and women aged between 17 and 45—from Deta and the surrounding areas to the Soviet Union began, under the pretext of participation in post-war "reconstruction" efforts. While some individuals returned by 1949, a new wave of deportations commenced in 1951. This time, it targeted Germans, Serbs, Hungarians, and Bessarabians (who had sought refuge in the Banat region since 1940), as part of the regime's campaign against so-called "Titoism."

In 1968, as part of Romania's territorial-administrative reorganization, Deta was granted town status for the third time in its history.

== Demographics ==
Ethnic composition (2021)
1. Romanians (65.7%)
2. Hungarians (8.78%)
3. Serbs (3.35%)
4. Roma (2.87%)
5. Germans (2.34%)
6. Bulgarians (1.37%)
7. Unknown (15.1%)
8. Others (0.57%)
Religious composition (2021)
1. Orthodox (57.0%)
2. Roman Catholics (18.7%)
3. Serbian Orthodox (3.10%)
4. Pentecostals (2.16%)
5. Unknown (16.4%)
6. Others (2.34%)
7. Irreligious, atheists and agnostics (0.26%)

Deta had a population of 5,670 inhabitants at the 2021 census, down 9.43% from the 2011 census. Most inhabitants are Romanians (65.66%), larger minorities being represented by Hungarians (8.78%), Serbs (3.35%), Roma (2.87%), Germans (2.34%) and Bulgarians (1.37%). For 15.06% of the population, ethnicity is unknown. By religion, most inhabitants are Orthodox (57.05%), but there are also minorities of Roman Catholics (18.73%), Serbian Orthodox (3.1%) and Pentecostals (2.16%). For 16.36% of the population, religious affiliation is unknown.

Census		Ethnic composition
Year	Population	Romanians	Hungarians	Germans	Jews	Roma	Serbs	Bulgarians
1880	3,646	789	216	2,542	–	–	77	–
1890	4,410	818	364	3,056	–	–	96	–
1900	4,950	986	776	3,036	–	–	109	–
1910	5,147	1,131	954	2,885	–	–	149	–
1920	4,679	1,102	752	2,583	104	–	–	–
1930	4,965	1,349	998	2,404	25	16	137	22
1941	5,210	1,511	1,089	2,360	–	–	–	–
1956	5,707	2,315	1,572	1,525	10	6	217	29
1966	6,680	2,833	1,699	1,565	6	37	455	57
1977	6,937	3,198	1,636	1,435	7	110	451	64
1992	7,121	4,227	1,418	660	1	176	464	129
2002	6,423	4,140	1,152	392	2	227	328	134
2011	6,260	4,247	869	252	–	144	248	121
2021	5,670	3,723	498	133	–	163	190	78

== Politics and administration ==
The town of Deta is administered by a mayor and a local council composed of 14 councilors. The mayor, Petru Roman, from the Social Democratic Party, has been in office since 2008. As from the 2024 local elections, the local council has the following composition by political parties:

Party	Seats	Composition
Social Democratic Party	7	
Alliance for the Union of Romanians	3	
Force of the Right	2	
Ind.	1	
National Liberal Party	1	

== Economy ==
Industry is the most important economic sector. Traditionally, wood processing factories (plywood and veneers) and clay mining industry have developed here. After the 1989 revolution, development was severely hampered, so that after 2000 Deta could start a development process again. A number of foreign investors have opened numerous factories here that have polarized economic activity and human resources in the town and the area of influence. The main employer in the town is Eybl, with a textile profile, specialized in the production of interior components for cars (steering wheels, upholstery for BMW, Mercedes-Benz, Volkswagen, Jaguar, Renault, etc.). It has over 1,900 employees, of which 1,100 are from Deta, the rest coming from the surrounding localities. Other companies are present in the wood processing, food and textile industries.

== Transport ==
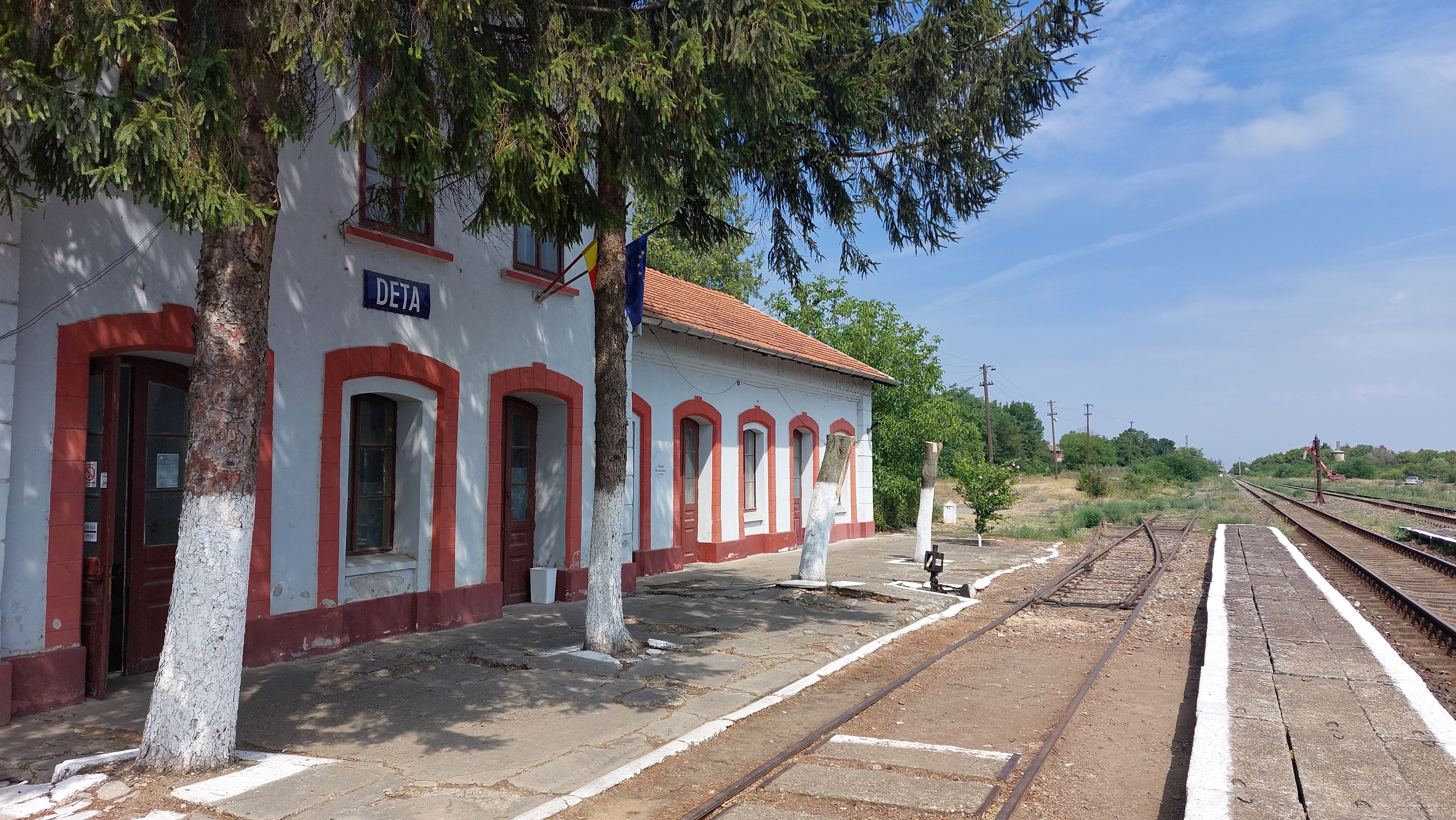
Deta train station

The primary access routes to Deta include DN59, which links the town to Timișoara and the Stamora Moravița border crossing; DN59B, which connects Deta to Banloc and further toward Jimbolia; and DJ172 (Deta–Birda), providing access toward Reșița. Additionally, Deta is served by a railway station, ensuring further regional connectivity.

== Twin towns ==
Deta is twinned with:

- (Hungary) Bordány
- (Serbia) Čoka
- (Italy) Gaglianico

== Notable people ==
- József Haubrich (1883–1939), Minister of Defense of Hungary
- Miodrag Milin (b. 1950), historian
- Ecaterina Neagu (b. 1952), painter
- Dan Radosav (b. 1959), journalist and director of the Banat Village Museum
- Ovidiu Ganț (b. 1966), politician
- Nora Blaj (b. 1971), painter
