= Gătaia =

- Town
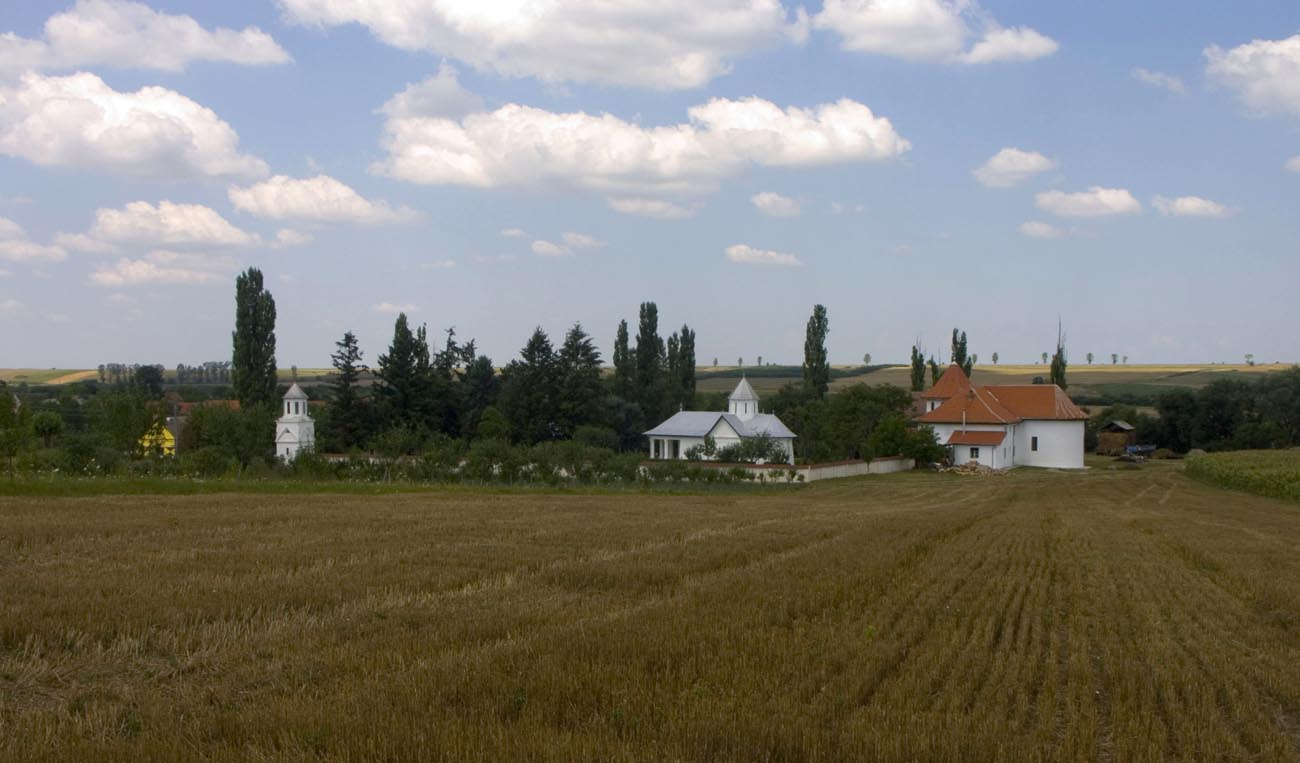
- Săraca Monastery in Șemlacu Mic

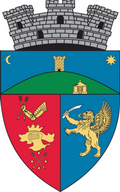
- Coat of arms

- Location in Timiș County

- Location in Romania
- Coordinates: 45°23′30″N 21°23′49″E
- Country: Romania
- County: Timiș

Government
  - Mayor (2024–2028): Raul Cozarov (PNL)
- Area: 162.44 km^{2} (62.72 sq mi)
- Elevation: 110 m (360 ft)
- Population (2021-12-01): 5,473
  - Density: 33.69/km^{2} (87.26/sq mi)
- Time zone: UTC+02:00 (EET)
  - Summer (DST): UTC+03:00 (EEST)
- Postal code: 307185–307196
- Area code: (+40) 02 56
- Vehicle reg.: TM
- Website: primariaorasgataia.ro

Gătaia (Hungarian: Gátalja; German: Gataja, archaically Gotthal; Serbian: Гатаја, romanized: Gataja) is a town in Timiș County, Romania. It administers five villages: Butin, Percosova, Sculia, Șemlacu Mare, and Șemlacu Mic. Declared a town in 2004, it also administered four other villages until that time, when they were split off to form Birda commune.

== Geography ==
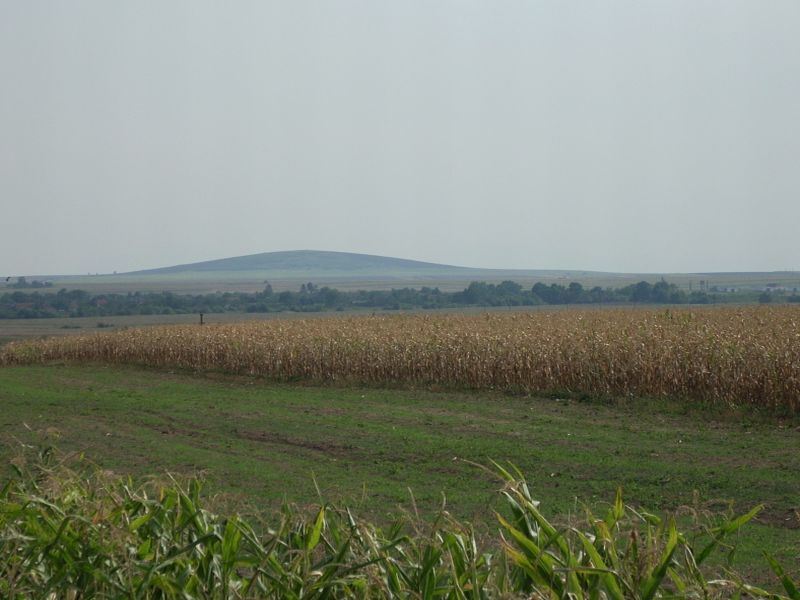
Șumigu (205 m), an extinct volcano south of Gătaia

Gătaia lies on both banks of the Bârzava River. Some of the villages (Șemlacu Mare, Șemlacu Mic, Butin, and Percosova) are located south of Gătaia around the Șumigu Hill, an extinct volcano in the Tisza Plain, along the Moravița, Crivaia, and Clopodia streams, tributaries to the left of Bârzava, and Sculia is also located on the Bârzava River but west of Gătaia, occupying the northernmost position in this administrative unit. Gătaia connects to Timișoara and Reșița both by rail and by national road DN58.

== History ==
The earliest documented mention of Gătaia dates back to 1323, referencing a certain Domokos, whose father had been sent to the area to delineate the village boundaries. At that time, the settlement was known as Gothal or Gothalö. The chapter of Arad records that in 1343, Gătaia was owned by Ladislau Omeri and later passed to his sister Clara. At that time, it consisted of Gothal Inferior ("Lower Gothal") and Gothal Superior ("Upper Gothal"), two settlements that eventually merged. During the reign of King Sigismund (1389–1437), the settlement was first recorded under the name Gatay. According to some researchers, this name may originate from the Turkic-Tatar patronymic Gea-Gatay, from which the current name could be derived.

For a long time this locality belonged to Krassó County and only at the end of the 17th century, in 1779, it was incorporated into Temes County. Gătaia, known then as Gattaja, was inhabited during the Austrian occupation of Banat. According to Hungarian historian Elek Fényes, Gătaia was a "Vlach" (Romanian) settlement at that time. In 1823 Gătaia was sold by tax authorities to the feudal lords Ludovic and Carol Gorove, who decided to colonize it with Hungarians. By the end of the 19th century, Hungarians were already in the majority.

In 2004 Gătaia received the status of a town, having in its administration the localities of Butin, Percosova, Sculia, Șemlacu Mare and Șemlacu Mic. At the same time, the villages of Berecuța, Birda, Mânăstire and Sângeorge, separated from the former commune and formed the commune of Birda.

== Demographics ==
Ethnic composition (2021)
1. Romanians (73.7%)
2. Hungarians (7.39%)
3. Slovaks (4.93%)
4. Unknown (12.7%)
5. Others (1.31%)
Religious composition (2021)
1. Orthodox (56.6%)
2. Roman Catholics (15.5%)
3. Pentecostals (9.11%)
4. Baptists (1.15%)
5. Reformed (1.02%)
6. Unknown (13.2%)
7. Others (3.19%)
8. Irreligious, atheists and agnostics (0.21%)

Gătaia had a population of 5,473 inhabitants at the 2021 census, down 6.62% from the 2011 census. Most inhabitants are Romanians (73.68%), larger minorities being represented by Hungarians (7.39%) and Slovaks (4.93%). For 12.69% of the population, ethnicity is unknown. By religion, most inhabitants are Orthodox (56.64%), but there are also minorities of Roman Catholics (15.53%), Pentecostals (9.11%), Baptists (1.15%) and Reformed (1.02%). For 13.15% of the population, religious affiliation is unknown.

Census		Ethnic composition
Year	Population	Romanians	Hungarians	Germans	Roma	Serbs	Slovaks
1880	6,285	2,756	1,551	1,307	–	89	463
1890	7,276	2,892	2,085	1,673	–	128	425
1900	8,603	3,173	2,598	2,084	–	173	512
1910	8,912	3,536	2,917	1,724	–	139	538
1920	7,909	3,255	2,314	1,500	–	–	–
1930	8,010	3,564	1,939	1,644	149	95	616
1941	7,766	3,656	1,822	1,488	–	–	–
1956	7,774	–	–	–	–	–	–
1966	7,799	5,058	1,843	335	66	63	416
1977	8,142	5,068	1,650	276	513	69	521
1992	6,463	4,476	1,209	180	58	44	478
2002	6,155	4,565	929	90	58	30	438
2011	5,861	4,238	654	55	33	34	428
2021	5,473	4,033	405	23	20	12	270

== Politics and administration ==
The town of Gătaia is administered by a mayor and a local council composed of 15 councilors. The mayor, Raul Cozarov, from the National Liberal Party, has been in office since 2012. As from the 2024 local elections, the local council has the following composition by political parties:

Party	Seats	Composition
National Liberal Party	8	
Democratic Alliance of Hungarians in Romania	3	
Social Democratic Party	3	
Alliance for the Union of Romanians	1	

== Culture and cultural heritage ==
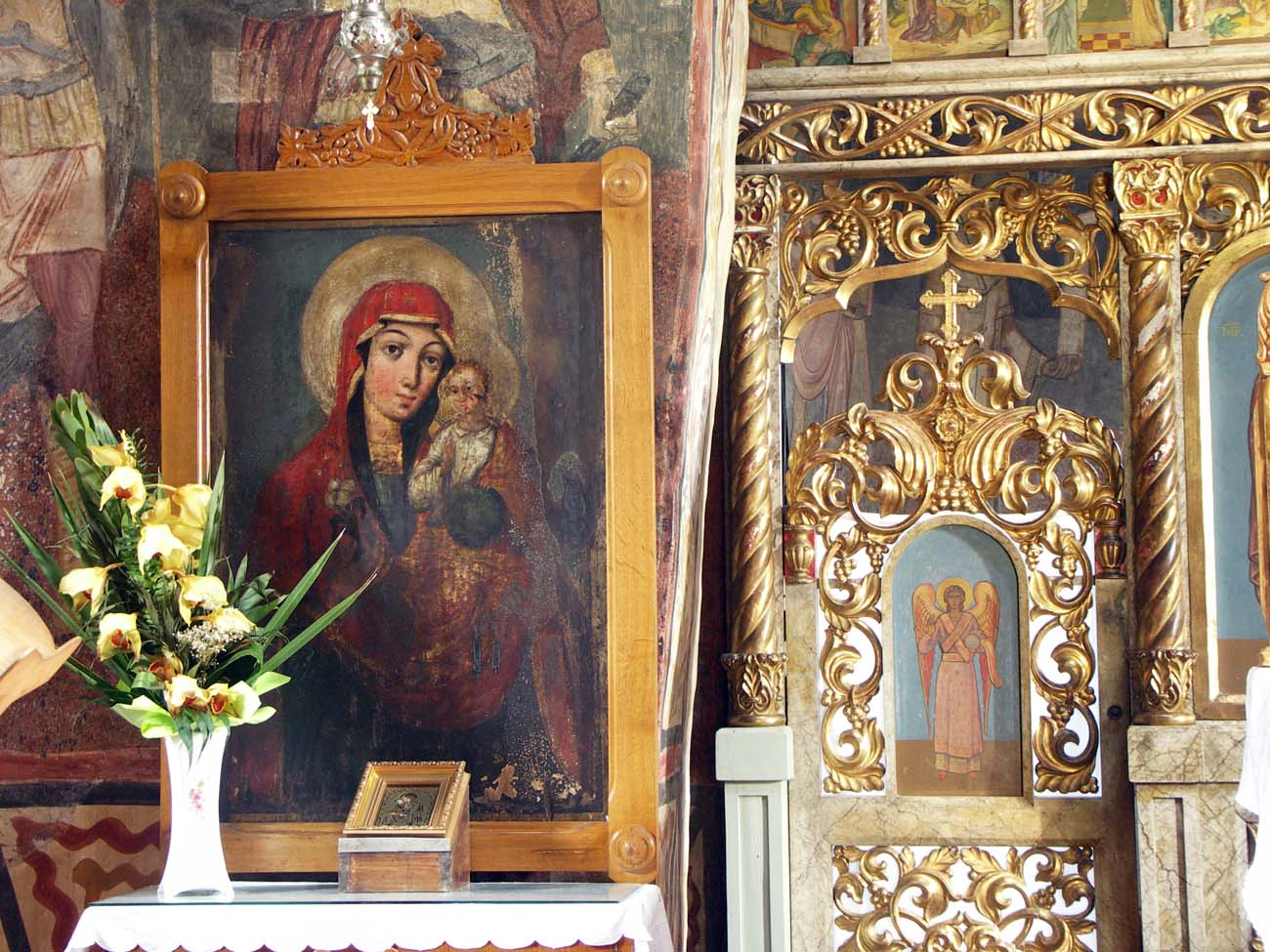
The miracle-working icon of the Săraca Monastery

Arguably the most significant and renowned landmark in Gătaia is the Săraca Monastery. While the precise date of the church's construction remains unknown, the earliest documentary evidence dates back to the year 1270. The monastery remained active until 1778, when it was closed by order of Emperor Joseph II. Following its closure, the monastic community was disbanded, and the monastery's possessions—such as books, icons, and other religious artifacts—were relocated to the Mesić Monastery near Vršac. The church of the Săraca Monastery was reconstructed in stone and brick in 1443 by the monk Macarie of Tismana, who had been sent by Saint Nicodemus of Tismana. Later, in 1730, the church underwent renovation under the patronage of Giuriciko Lazarevici and his sons, Nicolae and Chiriac. The monastery houses a revered icon of the Mother of God, believed by many to be miraculous. It also preserves the relics of Saints Nicholas, Thecla, and Philothea. Today, the Săraca Monastery is officially recognized as a historical monument, listed under the code LMI TM-II-m-A-06294.

Gătaia hosts a National House that serves as a cultural hub, featuring exhibitions of graphic art, caricature, and painting. It periodically hosts a regional chess competition and includes a performance hall with a seating capacity of 300, a library housing approximately 12,500 volumes, and a dedicated space for youth bodybuilding activities. Additional cultural centers are located in the surrounding localities of Butin and Percosova.

The most significant local celebration is the ruga (also known as nedeia), which coincides with the feast day of the church's patron saint. Traditionally, this event is observed between Easter and the Feast of Saint Paraskeva (14 October), without occurring outside this timeframe. Additionally, Gătaia has preserved the custom of organizing mixed fairs, held monthly on the first Sunday, alongside the operation of a daily agri-food market.

The cultural life of Gătaia is closely associated with the activities of the Doina Choral Association, which was granted legal status in 1990 and continues the legacy of the former Gătaia Cultural Center choir. The Doina Choir of Gătaia was established in 1936 under the direction and instruction of Ion Iorgu. Initially formed as a male choir, it later evolved into a mixed ensemble.

== Education ==
Education has been documented in Gătaia since 1776, the first confessional school existing here since 1781. During the reign of Empress Maria Theresa, the first laws dealing with the organization of education appeared. After 1823, for 50 years, in Gătaia there were two confessional schools: Romanian Orthodox and Hungarian Catholic.

At present, the Gătaia Theoretical High School has a number of 25 classrooms in three buildings and four arranged in the building of the boys' boarding school. The second building was completed in 1969, and the third building in 1978. About 750 students study at the high school in Gătaia. Primary schools (1–4) also exist in Sculia (three classrooms), Șemlacu Mare (four classrooms), Șemlacu Mic (four classrooms), Butin (four classrooms) and Percosova (four classrooms).

== Healthcare ==
The first sanitary precinct was established by order of the Minister of Health of the Austro-Hungarian Empire in 1901, when the first state physician, Ludovic Kardos, was appointed. About 9,000 people from the commune and the neighboring villages were assigned here. From 1968, the sanitary precinct was transformed into a health center, which included the entire territory of the commune, with three sanitary dispensaries.

The Gătaia Psychiatric Hospital started operating in December 1966, being built on the site of a former abandoned barracks, in the immediate vicinity of a locust and fir forest. The founding fathers of this hospital were professor Eduard Pamfil and lecturer Ștefan Stössel. The hospital is the practice base for the students of the West University of Timișoara, the specializations psychology and social assistance, part of the psychiatrists and psychologists of the hospital being associate teachers of the West University.

The first private pharmacy was established in 1890; currently there are two pharmacies in the town.

== Transport ==
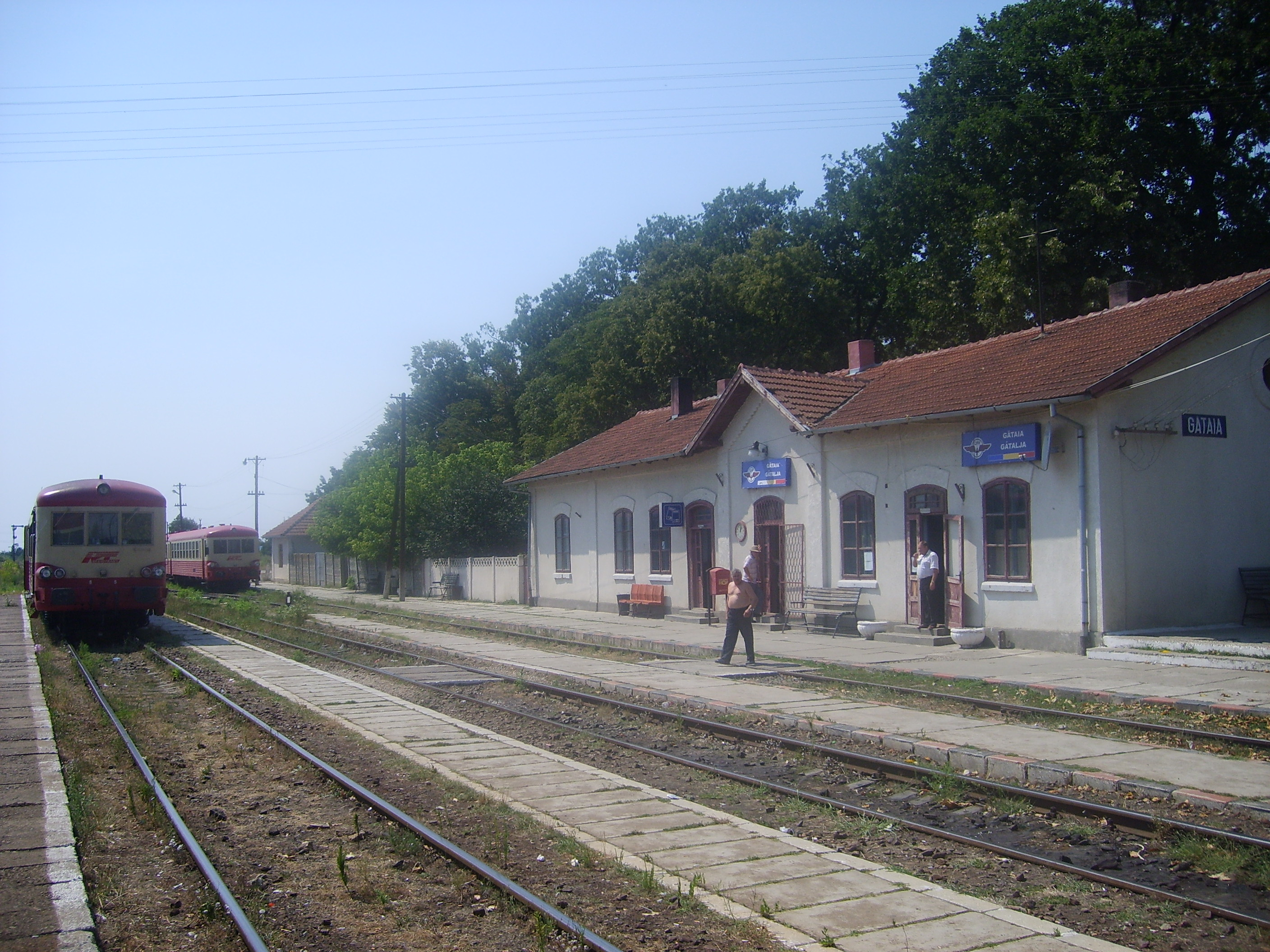
Gătaia train station

The total length of the roads in Gătaia is 33 km, and the railway stretches over a distance of 24 km.

Gătaia is served by a CFR railway station, located on the CFR 900 Main Line, at the intersection of key railway routes connecting Buziaș and Jamu Mare, as well as Timișoara and Reșița. In recent years, railway traffic has declined, as most residents now prefer bus transportation. To accommodate this shift, Gătaia also hosts a bus station that facilitates daily routes connecting Timișoara–Reșița, Bocșa–Timișoara, and Gătaia–Timișoara.

== Notable people ==
- Mihail Gașpar (1881–1929), archpriest, journalist and writer
- János Horváth (1894–1950), writer and journalist
- Adalbert Dezső (1909–1937), footballer
- László Böcskei (b. 1965), bishop
