= Mali Žam =

Mali Žam Мали Жам (Serbian) Jamu Mic (Romanian)
- Village (Selo)
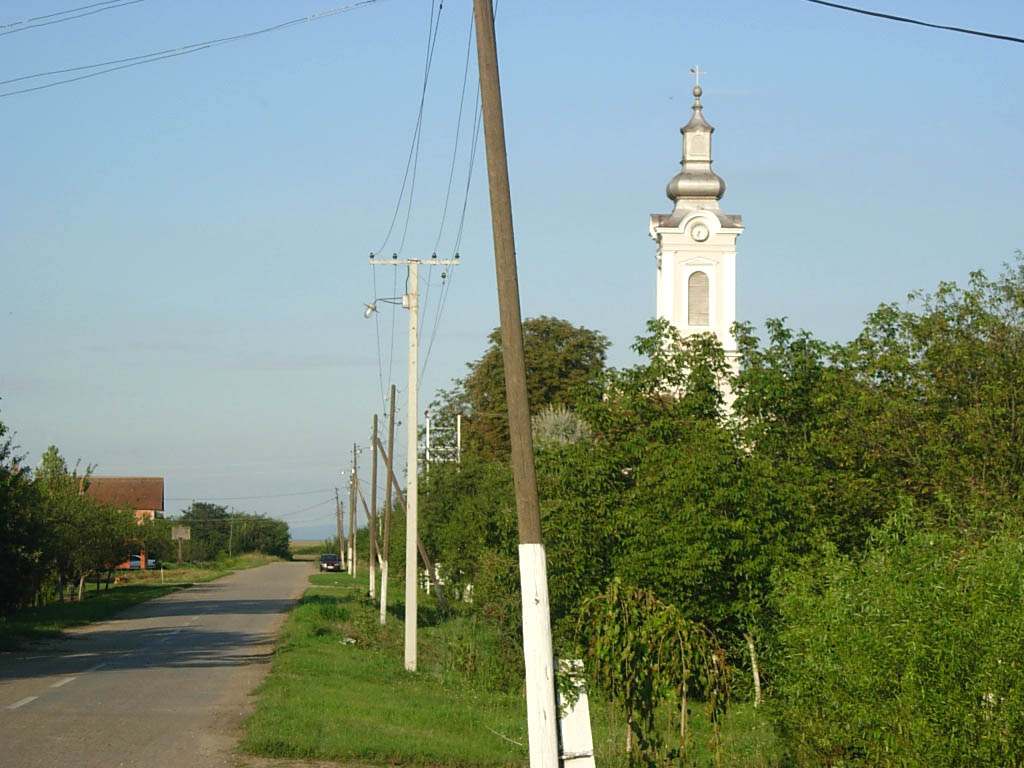
- The Romanian Orthodox Church

- Location of Mali Žam within Serbia Mali Žam (Serbia) Mali Žam (Europe)
- Coordinates: 45°12′23″N 21°20′13″E
- Country: Serbia
- Province: Vojvodina
- District: South Banat
- Municipality: Vršac
- Elevation: 88 m (289 ft)

Population (2022)
  - Total: 202
- Time zone: UTC+1 (CET)
  - Summer (DST): UTC+2 (CEST)
- Area code: +381(0)13
- Car plates: VŠ

Mali Žam (Serbian Cyrillic: Мали Жам; Romanian: Jamu Mic; Hungarian: Kiszsám) is a village located in the administrative area of the City of Vršac, South Banat District, Vojvodina, Serbia. The village has a population of 522 people (2022 census).

== Name ==
The name in Serbian means "Small Žam/Jam". Across the border into Romania, the first village is called Jamu Mare (Great Jam/Žam).

== Demographics ==
=== Historical population ===
- 1961: 880
- 1971: 698
- 1981: 565
- 1991: 499
- 2002: 379
- 2011: 275
- 2022: 202

=== Ethnic groups ===
According to data from the 2022 census, ethnic groups in the village include:

- 94 (46.5%) Romanians
- 61 (30.2%) Serbs
- Others/Undeclared/Unknown

== See also ==
- List of places in Serbia
- List of cities, towns and villages in Vojvodina
