= Vornic (river) =

- Location within Romania

Location
- Country: Romania
- Counties: Caraș-Severin County
- Villages: Ramna

Physical characteristics
- Mouth: Bârzava
  - location: Berzovia
  - coordinates: 45.4330°N 21.6539°E
- Length: 13 km (8.1 mi)
- Basin size: 46 km^{2} (18 sq mi)

Basin features
- Progression: Bârzava→ Timiș→ Danube→ Black Sea
- Tributaries
  - right: Smida

The Vornic is a right tributary of the river Bârzava in Romania. It flows into the Bârzava near Berzovia. Its length is 13 km (8.1 mi) and its basin size is 46 km^{2} (18 sq mi).
