= Copăș =

Copăș Gârliște
- Location within Romania

Location
- Country: Romania
- Counties: Caraș-Severin County
- Villages: Biniș

Physical characteristics
- Mouth: Bârzava
  - location: Downstream of Bocșa
  - coordinates: 45.3914°N 21.6781°E
- Length: 15 km (9.3 mi)
- Basin size: 38 km^{2} (15 sq mi)

Basin features
- Progression: Bârzava→ Timiș→ Danube→ Black Sea

The Copăș (also: Gârliște) or is a left tributary of the river Bârzava in Romania. It discharges into the Bârzava near Bocșa. Its length is 15 km (9.3 mi) and its basin size is 38 km^{2} (15 sq mi).
