= Bersobis =

Coordinates: 45.429085°N 21.621184°E

- Castra of Berzobia, Castra of Jidovin; Berzobis, Berzobia, Bersobia, Bersovia
- Location within Romania
- Location: Berzovia, Caraș-Severin, Romania

History
- Founded: 2nd century AD
- Abandoned: 3rd century AD

Site notes
- Elevation: 137 m (449 ft)
- Excavation dates: 1862–1866 1961–1962 1965–1968 1969–1970 1998–1999 2000–2001
- Condition: Ruined

Bersobis was an ancient Dacian fortress conquered in Trajan's Dacian Wars with the Romans. It became a legionary fortress in the Roman province of Dacia in the 2nd century AD. It is located near the town of Berzovia, Romania.

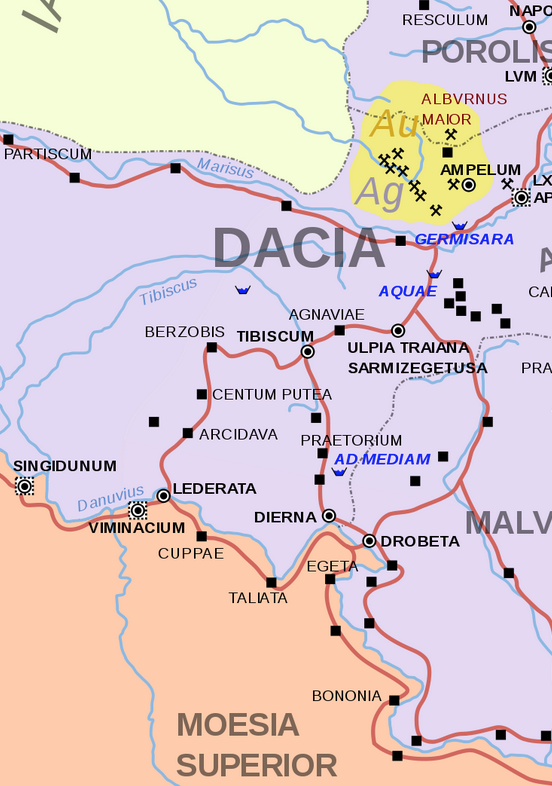
Western Dacia

The legion Legio IV Flavia Felix built its legionary fortress and base here in about 108 AD which endured till 118/9. It was built in an enclosure with earth and wooden ramparts and with a single defensive trench outside. The principia (headquarters), after the first wooden phase, were rebuilt in stone on the same site. A fire later destroyed it, without being rebuilt. In 118/9 the legion returned to its old south-Danube garrison at Singidunum and a civilian settlement developed on the site of the fort and its canabae which became a city and municipium.

The city became wealthy through trade due to its location on the crossroads from Arcidava (Vărădia) and Moldova Veche. A road from Moldova Veche passed through the Roman mining centres from Moldova Noua to Sasca, and from there to Ciclova and Oraviţa, continuing through Maidan, Dognecea and Bocşa ending at Bersobis. A Roman road continued for 12 miles (17 km) to the next Roman fort of Azizis.

The defensive ditch can be seen on the “Erinii road” as well as the traces of town houses.

In 1968 an Imperial helmet was found here.

== See also ==
- List of castra
