= Birda =

- Commune
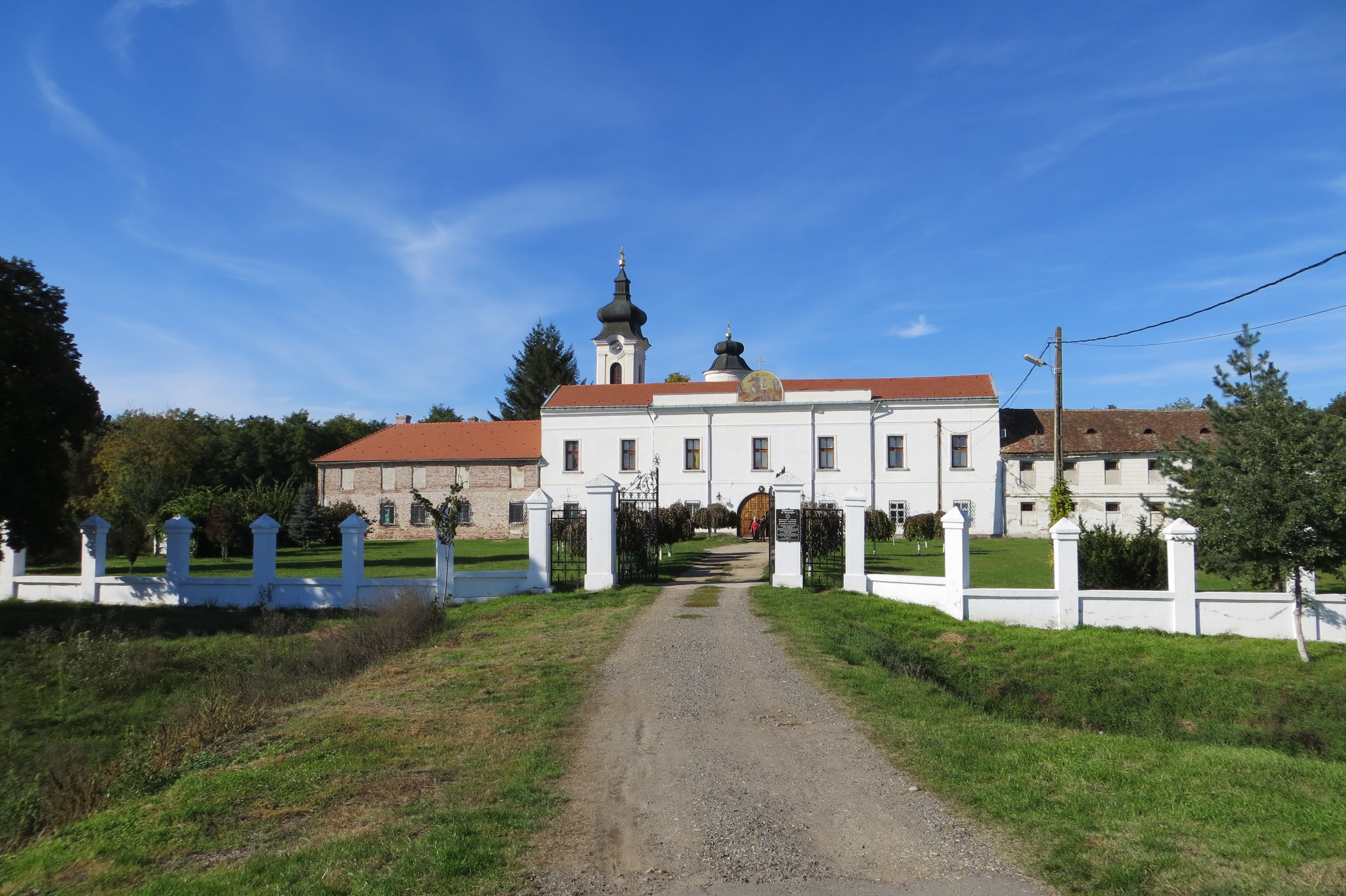
- St. George Monastery in Mânăstire

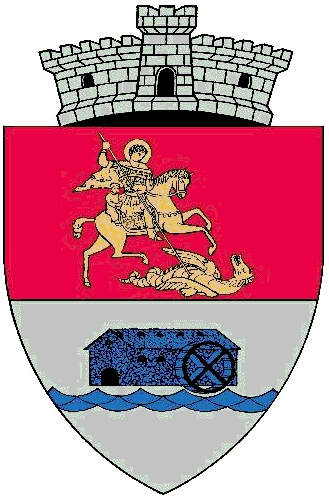
- Coat of arms

- Location in Timiș County

- Location in Romania
- Coordinates: 45°25′45″N 21°20′20″E
- Country: Romania
- County: Timiș

Government
  - Mayor (2008–): Gheorghe Marius Stoian (PSD)
- Area: 68.67 km^{2} (26.51 sq mi)
- Population (2021-12-01): 1,819
  - Density: 26.49/km^{2} (68.61/sq mi)
- Time zone: UTC+02:00 (EET)
  - Summer (DST): UTC+03:00 (EEST)
- Postal code: 307186–307192
- Vehicle reg.: TM
- Website: www.birda.ro

Birda (Hungarian and German: Birda; Serbian: Бирда, romanized: Birda) is a commune in Timiș County, Romania. It is composed of four villages: Berecuța, Birda (commune seat), Mânăstire and Sângeorge.

== Geography ==
Birda is located in the southeastern part of Timiș County, bordering the town of Gătaia and the communes of Tormac, Voiteg, Opatița and Denta.

=== Climate ===
The climate is temperate continental, having an intermediate character between the continental, Mediterranean and oceanic climates. Winters are relatively mild, summers are long and hot, springs and autumns are short. The average annual temperature is 10.6 °C (51.1 °F), and the average annual rainfall is 600–700 mm (24–28 in), ensuring very good conditions for plant cultivation and animal husbandry.

== History ==
The first recorded mention of Birda dates from 1690, from Marsigli's notes. It is probably much older and inhabited during the Turkish occupation. By 1717 Birda is recorded in the Habsburg imperial documents with 80 houses; Berecuța with 28 houses; and Sângeorge with 30 houses. After 1779, it belonged to Temes County, Plasa Deta, with a post office and later a train station. In 1828, the Aerarium sold Birda to the Termacici family. By 1842 it had become the property of Baron Lo Presti. In 1852 it came into the possession of Baron Ukermann's wife. Until the end of the 19th century, Birda was inhabited only by Romanians, but at that time, the great owners settled German and Hungarian families here to cultivate their estates.

The commune of Birda was established by Law 84/2004, separating from the town of Gătaia.

== Demographics ==
Ethnic composition (2021)
1. Romanians (85.8%)
2. Serbs (2.36%)
3. Germans (1.09%)
4. Hungarians (1.04%)
5. Unknown (8.19%)
6. Others (1.56%)
Religious composition (2021)
1. Orthodox (80.3%)
2. Pentecostals (3.79%)
3. Roman Catholics (2.58%)
4. Serbian Orthodox (2.25%)
5. Unknown (8.57%)
6. Others (2.07%)
7. Irreligious, atheists and agnostics (0.43%)

Birda had a population of 1,819 inhabitants at the 2021 census, down 1.46% from the 2011 census. Most inhabitants are Romanians (85.76%), larger minorities being represented by Serbs (2.36%), Germans (1.09%) and Hungarians (1.04%). For 8.19% of the population, ethnicity is unknown. By religion, most inhabitants are Orthodox (80.31%), but there are also minorities of Pentecostals (3.79%), Roman Catholics (2.58%) and Serbian Orthodox (2.25%). For 8.57% of the population, religious affiliation is unknown.

Census		Ethnic composition
Year	Population	Romanians	Hungarians	Germans	Ukrainians	Serbs
1880	1,986	918	127	437	–	477
1890	2,277	978	173	558	–	538
1900	2,515	1,197	166	577	–	568
1910	2,665	1,011	214	611	–	807
1920	2,357	1,015	38	724	–	–
1930	2,822	1,344	40	812	–	610
1941	2,639	1,231	16	758	–	–
1956	2,291	–	–	–	–	–
1966	2,176	1,295	33	507	–	336
1977	2,164	1,316	23	509	–	257
1992	2,061	1,746	16	57	48	136
2002	1,948	1,726	19	20	43	74
2011	1,846	1,599	21	17	28	64
2021	1,819	1,560	19	20	15	43

== Politics and administration ==
The commune of Birda is administered by a mayor and a local council composed of 11 councilors. The mayor, Gheorghe Marius Stoian, from the Social Democratic Party, has been in office since 2008. As from the 2024 local elections, the local council has the following composition by political parties:

Party	Seats	Composition
Social Democratic Party	10	
National Liberal Party	1	

== Notable people ==
- Iuliu Ionescu (1888–1963), first praetor of Lipova and sub-prefect of Timiș-Torontal County
- Laza Cnejevici (1936–2015), vocalist and instrumentalist
