= Bârzăvița =

- Location within Romania

Location
- Country: Romania
- Counties: Caraș-Severin County

Physical characteristics
- Mouth: Bârzava
  - location: Reșița
  - coordinates: 45.3277°N 21.8664°E
- Length: 7 km (4.3 mi)
- Basin size: 12 km^{2} (4.6 sq mi)

Basin features
- Progression: Bârzava→ Timiș→ Danube→ Black Sea

The Bârzăvița is a left tributary of the river Bârzava in Romania. It flows into the Bârzava in the city Reșița. Its length is 7 km (4.3 mi) and its basin size is 12 km^{2} (4.6 sq mi).
