= Konak (Sečanj) =

Konak Конак (Serbian) Kanak (Hungarian)
- Village (Selo)
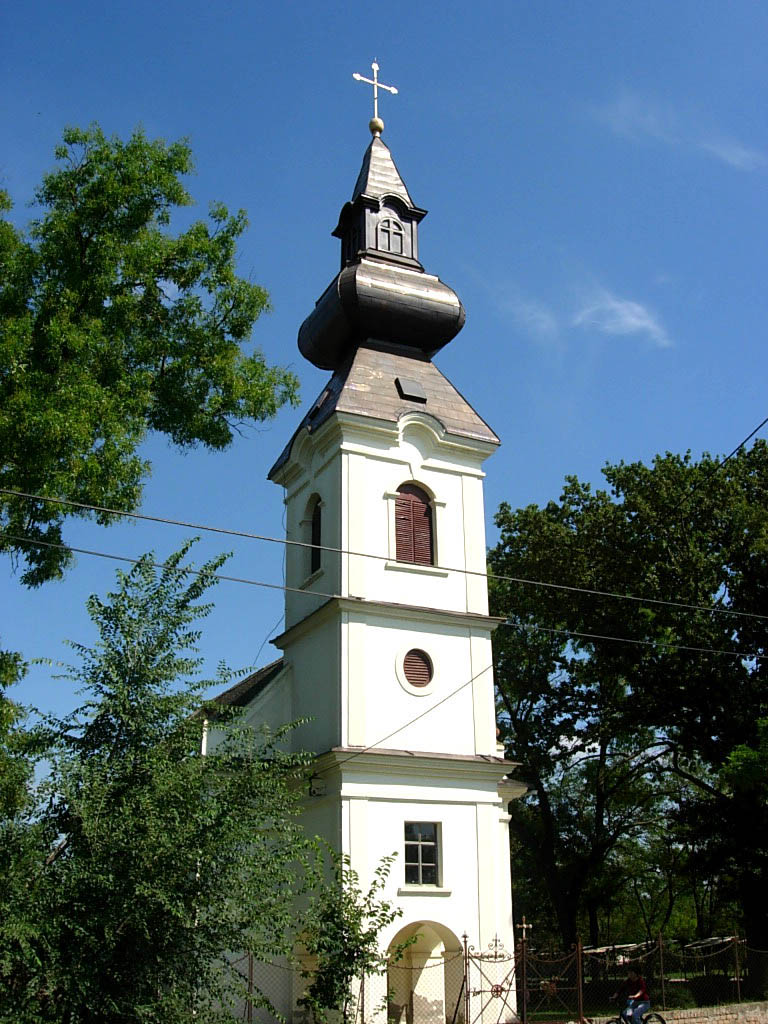
- The Orthodox Church

- Location within Serbia Konak (Serbia) Konak (Europe)
- Coordinates: 45°18′32″N 20°54′29″E
- Country: Serbia
- Province: Vojvodina
- District: Central Banat
- Municipalities: Sečanj
- Elevation: 43 m (141 ft)

Population (2011)
  - Konak: 777
- Time zone: UTC+1 (CET)
  - Summer (DST): UTC+2 (CEST)
- Postal code: 23253
- Area code: +381(0)23
- Car plates: ZR

Konak (Serbian Cyrillic: Конак) is a village in Serbia. It is situated in the Sečanj municipality, Central Banat District, Vojvodina province. The population of the village numbering 996 people (2002 census), including 401 Serbs (40.26%), 371 Hungarians (37.24%), and others.

== Name ==
In Serbian the village is known as Konak (Конак), in Hungarian as Kanak, in German as Konak, and in Romanian as Conac.

== Historical population ==
- 1961: 1,726
- 1971: 1,459
- 1981: 1,211
- 1991: 1,150

== School ==
The local elementary school is a converted mansion.

== Gallery ==
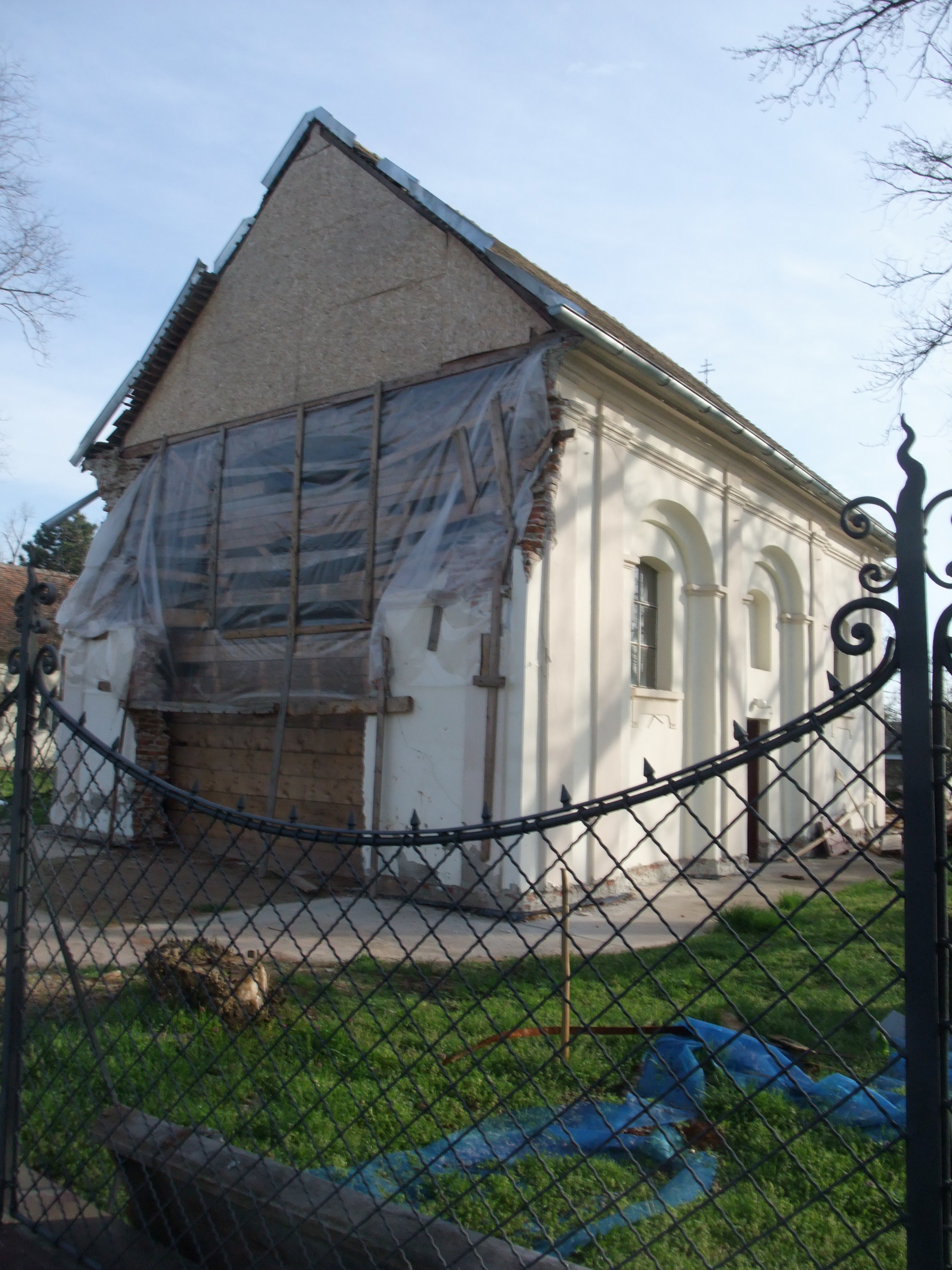
The Orthodox church April 2010

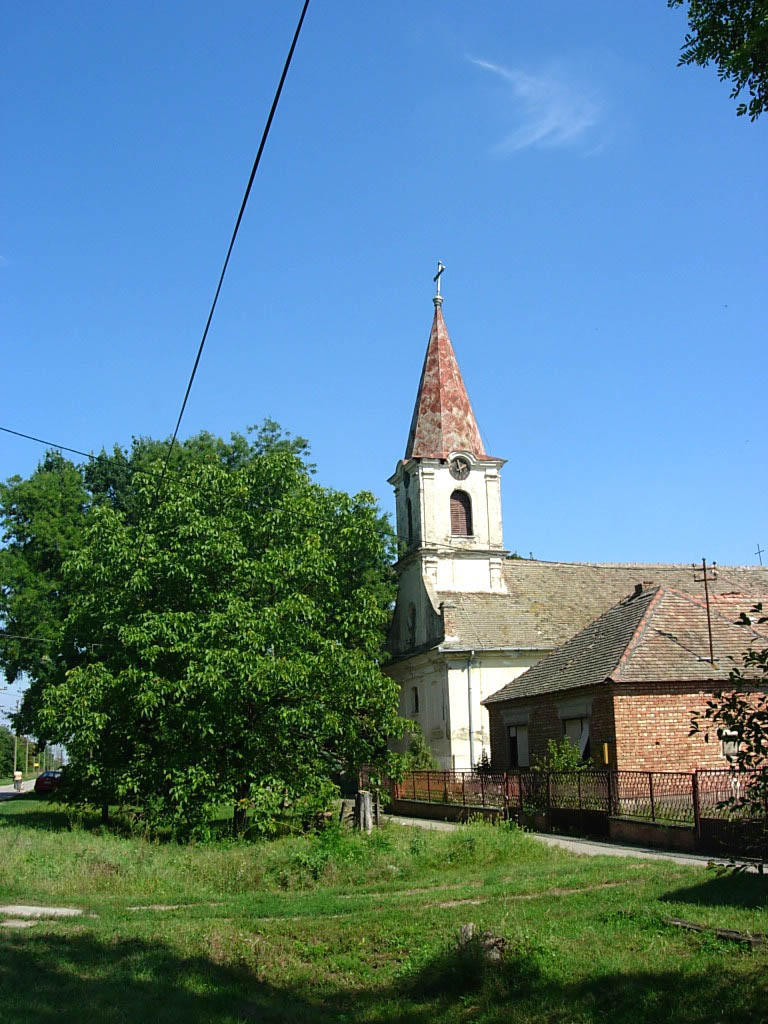
The Saint John the Baptist Catholic Church

Rush hour

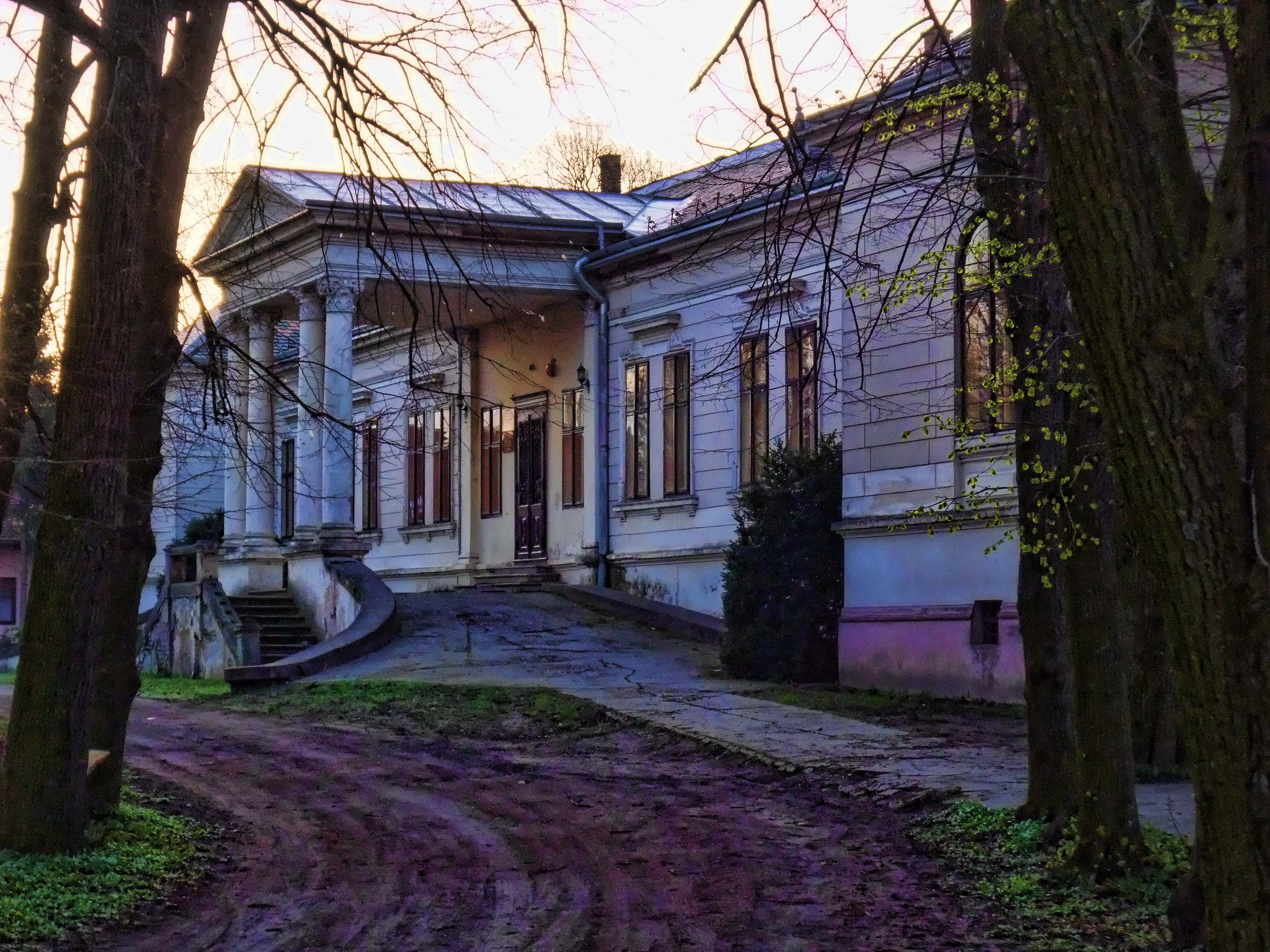
School, southside

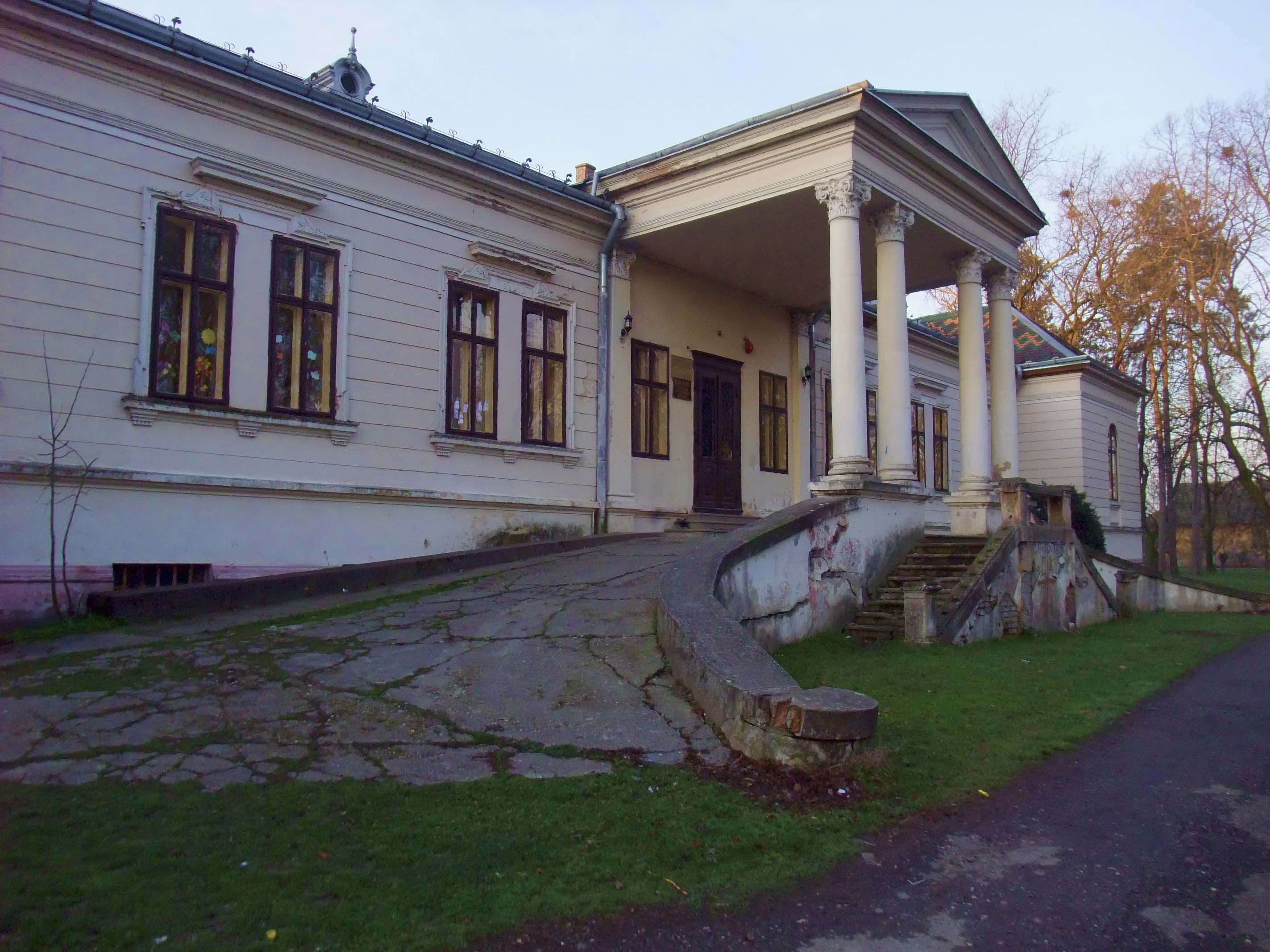
School, southside

== See also ==
- List of places in Serbia
- List of cities, towns and villages in Vojvodina
