= Văliug =

- Commune
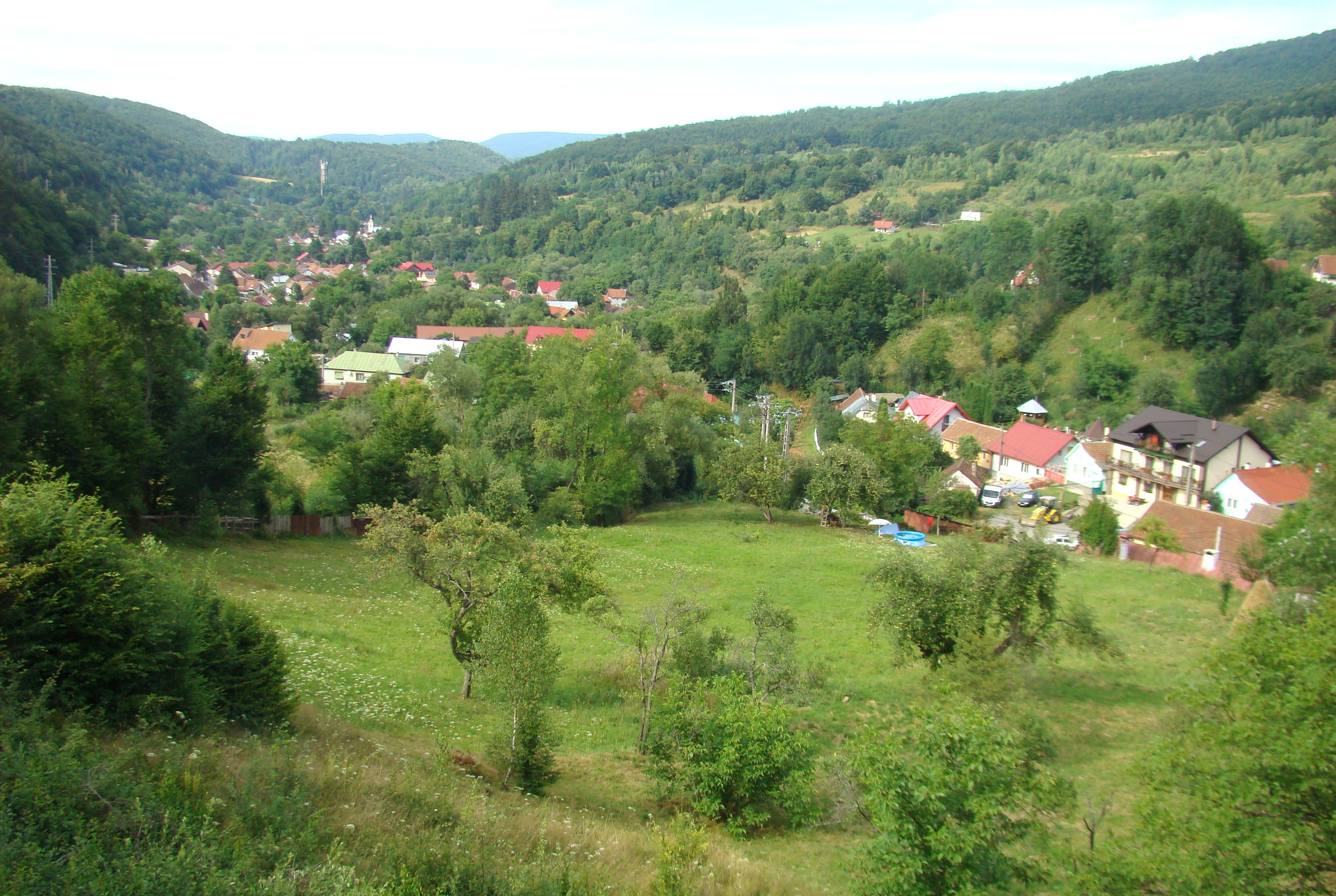
- Panoramic view of Văliug

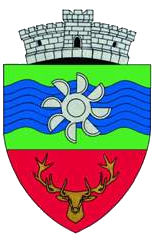
- Coat of arms

- Location in Caraș-Severin County

- Location in Romania
- Coordinates: 45°14′N 22°02′E
- Country: Romania
- County: Caraș-Severin

Government
  - Mayor (2020–2024): Gheorghe Sorin Blaga (PNL)
- Area: 97.9874 km^{2} (37.8331 sq mi)
- Elevation: 550 m (1,800 ft)
- Population (2021-12-01): 643
  - Density: 6.56/km^{2} (17.0/sq mi)
- Time zone: UTC+02:00 (EET)
  - Summer (DST): UTC+03:00 (EEST)
- Postal code: 327415
- Area code: (+40) 02 55
- Vehicle reg.: CS
- Website: primaria-valiug.ro

Văliug (German: Franzdorf; Hungarian: Ferencfalva) is a commune in Caraș-Severin County, western Romania, with a population of 741 people. It is composed of a single village, Văliug.
