= Sodol =

- Location within Romania

Location
- Country: Romania
- Counties: Caraș-Severin County

Physical characteristics
- Mouth: Bârzava
  - location: Reșița
  - coordinates: 45.2944°N 21.9341°E
- Length: 6 km (3.7 mi)
- Basin size: 24 km^{2} (9.3 sq mi)

Basin features
- Progression: Bârzava→ Timiș→ Danube→ Black Sea
- Tributaries
  - left: Valea Baciului

The Sodol is a left tributary of the river Bârzava in Romania. It discharges into the Bârzava in the city Reșița. Its length is 6 km (3.7 mi) and its basin size is 24 km^{2} (9.3 sq mi).
