= Țerova =

- Location within Romania

Location
- Country: Romania
- Counties: Caraș-Severin County
- Villages: Țerova

Physical characteristics
- Mouth: Bârzava
  - location: Reșița
  - coordinates: 45.3140°N 21.8832°E
- Length: 15 km (9.3 mi)
- Basin size: 39 km^{2} (15 sq mi)

Basin features
- Progression: Bârzava→ Timiș→ Danube→ Black Sea

The Țerova is a right tributary of the river Bârzava in Romania. It discharges into the Bârzava in the city Reșița. Its length is 15 km (9.3 mi) and its basin size is 39 km^{2} (15 sq mi).
