= Pester Women's Charitable Society =

First women's organization to be established in Hungary

The Pester Women's Charitable Society (Pesti Jótékony Nőegylet), founded in 1817 in Pest, was the first women's organization to form in Hungary. It was a Christian organization. In this organization middle and upper-class women worked together. The organization provided welfare services. It ended in 1892.
