= Moravița (upper Bârzava) =

- Location within Romania

Location
- Country: Romania
- Counties: Caraș-Severin County
- Villages: Ocna de Fier

Physical characteristics
- Source: Semenic Mountains
- Mouth: Bârzava
  - location: Bocșa
  - coordinates: 45.3805°N 21.6995°E
- Length: 14 km (8.7 mi)
- Basin size: 35 km^{2} (14 sq mi)

Basin features
- Progression: Bârzava→ Timiș→ Danube→ Black Sea

The Moravița is a left tributary of the river Bârzava in Romania. It discharges into the Bârzava in Bocșa. Its length is 14 km (8.7 mi) and its basin size is 35 km^{2} (14 sq mi).
