= Doclin =

- Commune
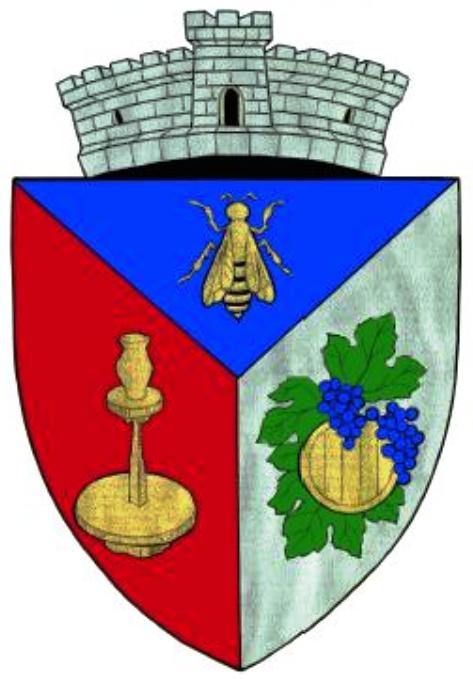
- Coat of arms

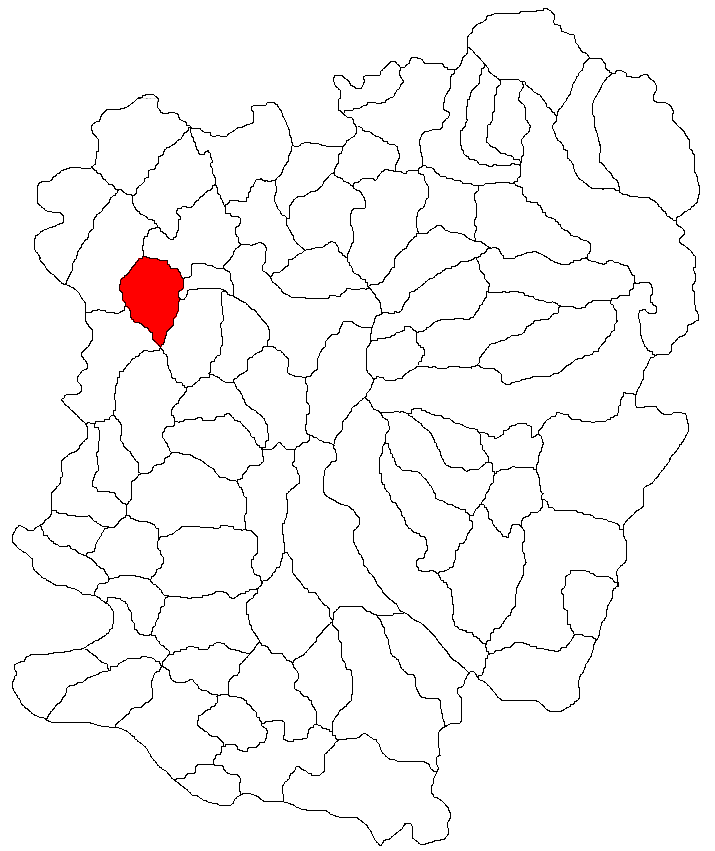
- Location in Caraș-Severin County

- Location in Romania
- Coordinates: 45°18′N 21°39′E
- Country: Romania
- County: Caraș-Severin

Government
  - Mayor (2024–2028): Dănuț Oană (PSD)
- Elevation: 212 m (696 ft)
- Population (2021-12-01): 1,522
- Time zone: UTC+02:00 (EET)
  - Summer (DST): UTC+03:00 (EEST)
- Postal code: 327175
- Area code: +(40) 02 55
- Vehicle reg.: CS
- Website: www.comuna-doclin.ro

Doclin (Hungarian: Doklény) is a commune in Caraș-Severin County, western Romania with a population of 1,522 people as of 2021. It is composed of three villages: Biniș (Bényes), Doclin, and Tirol (Királykegye; German: Königsgrad).

Historical population
| Year | Pop. | ±% |
|---|---|---|
| 1880 | 4,324 | — |
| 1910 | 4,529 | +4.7% |
| 1930 | 3,814 | −15.8% |
| 1977 | 2,876 | −24.6% |
| 2002 | 2,047 | −28.8% |
| 2011 | 1,741 | −14.9% |
| 2021 | 1,522 | −12.6% |
Source: Census data
