= Moravița (Bârzava) =

Moravița Moravica, Nanoviște
- Location within Serbia Location within Romania

Location
- Country: Romania, Serbia
- Counties/Provinces: Caraș-Severin, Timiș, Vojvodina

Physical characteristics
- Source: Caraș-Severin County, Romania
- Mouth: Danube–Tisa–Danube Canal
  - location: Vojvodina, Serbia
  - coordinates: 45.1566°N 21.0811°E

Basin features
- Progression: Bârzava→ Timiș→ Danube→ Black Sea
- Tributaries
  - left: Boculundia, Clopodia, Semnița, Crivaia
  - right: Agriș, Corniș, Măureni, Vaita, Roiga

The Moravița or Moravica (Romanian: Moravița, Serbian: Моравица / Moravica, Hungarian: Moravica-patak); in its upper course Nanoviște) is a left tributary of the river Bârzava (or Brzava) in Romania and Serbia. Its lower course has been canalized. It discharges into the Danube–Tisa–Danube Canal, which is connected to the Bârzava, near Barice. It flows through the villages Șemlacu Mare, Șemlacu Mic, Butin, Percosova, Dejan and Moravița in Romania, and Vatin and Margita in Serbia. In Romania, its length is 47 km (29 mi) and its basin size is 435 km^{2} (168 sq mi).
