= Jamu Mare =

- Commune
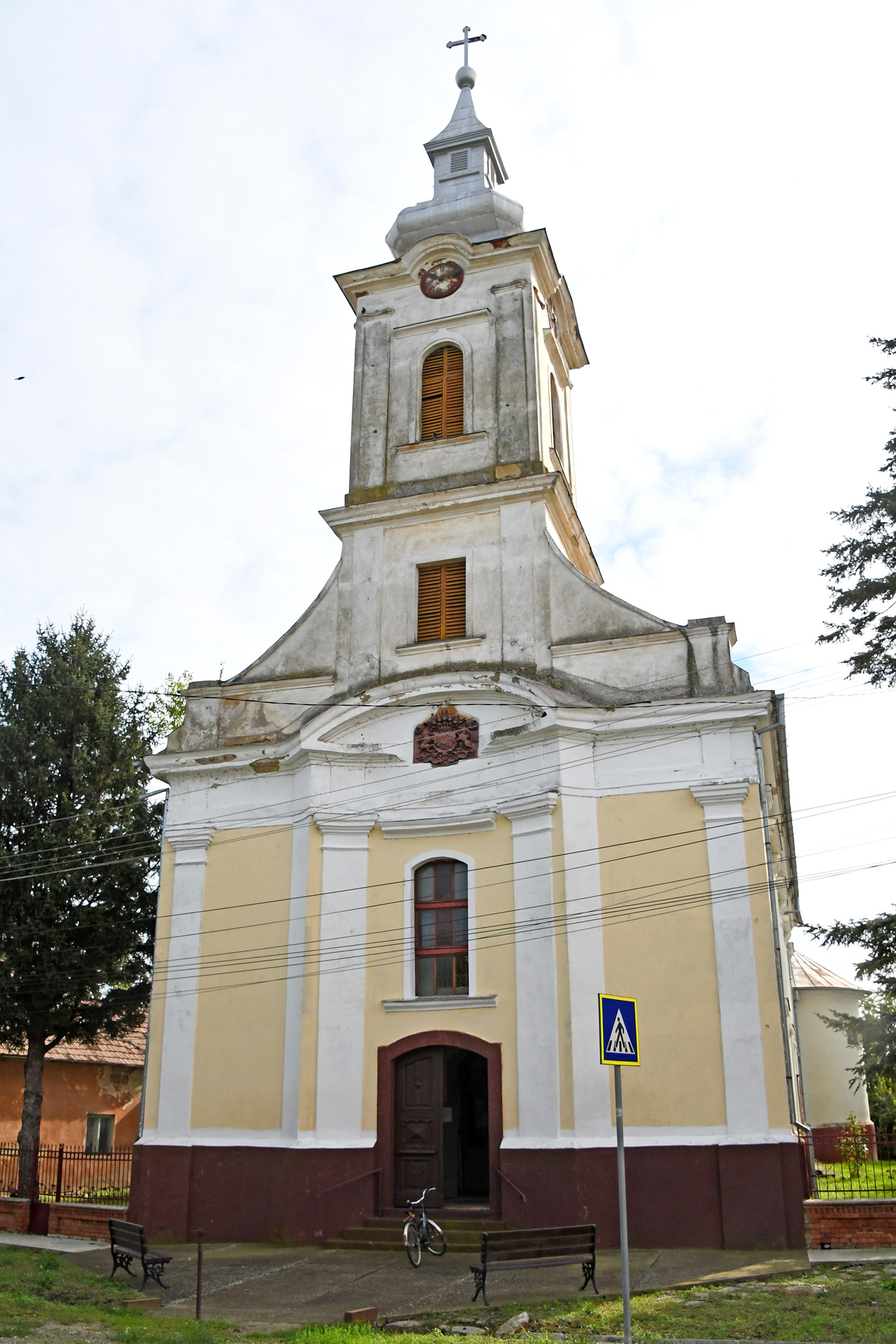
- The Roman Catholic church in Jamu Mare

- Location in Timiș County

- Location in Romania
- Coordinates: 45°15′N 21°25′E
- Country: Romania
- County: Timiș

Government
  - Mayor (2020–): Petre Gagea-Neaga (PNL)
- Area: 207.11 km^{2} (79.97 sq mi)
- Population (2021-12-01): 2,748
  - Density: 13.27/km^{2} (34.36/sq mi)
- Time zone: UTC+02:00 (EET)
  - Summer (DST): UTC+03:00 (EEST)
- Postal code: 307230–307234
- Vehicle reg.: TM
- Website: www.primariajamumare.ro

Jamu Mare (Hungarian: Nagyzsám; German: Freudenthal or Großscham; Serbian: Велики Жам, romanized: Veliki Žam) is a commune in Timiș County, Romania. It is composed of five villages: Clopodia, Ferendia, Gherman, Jamu Mare (commune seat), and Lățunaș.

== Name ==
In Romanian, the name means "Greater Jam/Žam". On the other side of the border, in Serbia, there is a village called Mali Žam ("Smaller Jam/Žam").

== History ==
Jamu Mare was first documented in 1335, under the name Jam. In 1370 it belonged to Krassó County and was called Suma. In Marsigli's notes from 1690 to 1700 it is called Seham and appears with 67 houses. Between 1730 and 1740 a plague epidemic decimated the population. Thus, with the third German colonization, a new locality was established a little further west of the old settlement. Then 152 houses were built. In 1786, thirty families settled here, and in the autumn of the next year the rest of the newcomers. It was then called Freudenthal. The administration moved the Romanians to the border area, and the houses were assigned to the Germans. At the end of the 18th century, Hungarian statistician Elek Fényes recorded that the village called Nagy-Zsám had a population of 1,562 and belonged to the nobleman László Karácsonyi. In 1807 another wave of German colonists from Torontál County settled here. 1809 is considered the year of the effective establishment of the new locality, on the current location. The old Freudenthal colony was gradually abandoned by the Germans, who preferred to move to Jamu Mare, and in 1893, the territory of the colony was incorporated into the current commune.

== Demographics ==
Ethnic composition (2021)
1. Romanians (84.6%)
2. Roma (4.07%)
3. Hungarians (2.14%)
4. Unknown (7.96%)
5. Others (1.26%)
Religious composition (2021)
1. Orthodox (73.8%)
2. Roman Catholics (8.33%)
3. Greek Catholics (5.09%)
4. Baptists (2.07%)
5. Unknown (8.29%)
6. Others (1.93%)
7. Irreligious, atheists and agnostics (0.50%)

Jamu Mare had a population of 2,748 inhabitants at the 2021 census, down 7.51% from the 2011 census. Most inhabitants are Romanians (84.57%), larger minorities being represented by Roma (4.07%) and Hungarians (2.14%). For 7.96% of the population, ethnicity is unknown. By religion, most inhabitants are Orthodox (73.79%), but there are also minorities of Roman Catholics (8.33%), Greek Catholics (5.09%) and Baptists (2.07%). For 8.29% of the population, religious affiliation is unknown.

Census		Ethnic composition
Year	Population	Romanians	Hungarians	Germans	Roma	Czechs	Slovaks
1880	6,978	3,127	581	2,750	–	–	425
1890	7,727	3,175	813	3,162	–	–	15
1900	8,174	3,535	950	3,074	–	–	20
1910	8,277	3,661	1,097	2,898	–	–	70
1920	3,717 (Note: Data on the populations of Jamu Mare and Lățunaș missing)	2,415	436	458	–	–	–
1930	7,513	3,656	754	2,527	114	–	406
1941	7,662	3,711	914	2,433	–	–	–
1956	6,283	3,958	738	1,311	–	234	20
1966	5,907	3,932	621	1,079	71	153	12
1977	4,697	3,315	468	686	103	95	6
1992	3,487	2,923	320	114	55	54	5
2002	3,327	2,893	243	63	73	35	3
2011	2,971	2,621	117	29	83	13	–
2021	2,748	2,324	59	15	112	5	–

== Politics and administration ==
The commune of Jamu Mare is administered by a mayor and a local council composed of 11 councilors. The mayor, Petre Gagea-Neaga, from the National Liberal Party, has been in office since 2020. As from the 2024 local elections, the local council has the following composition by political parties:

Party	Seats	Composition
National Liberal Party	5	
Social Democratic Party	4	
Force of the Right	1	
Alliance for the Union of Romanians	1	

== Infrastructure ==
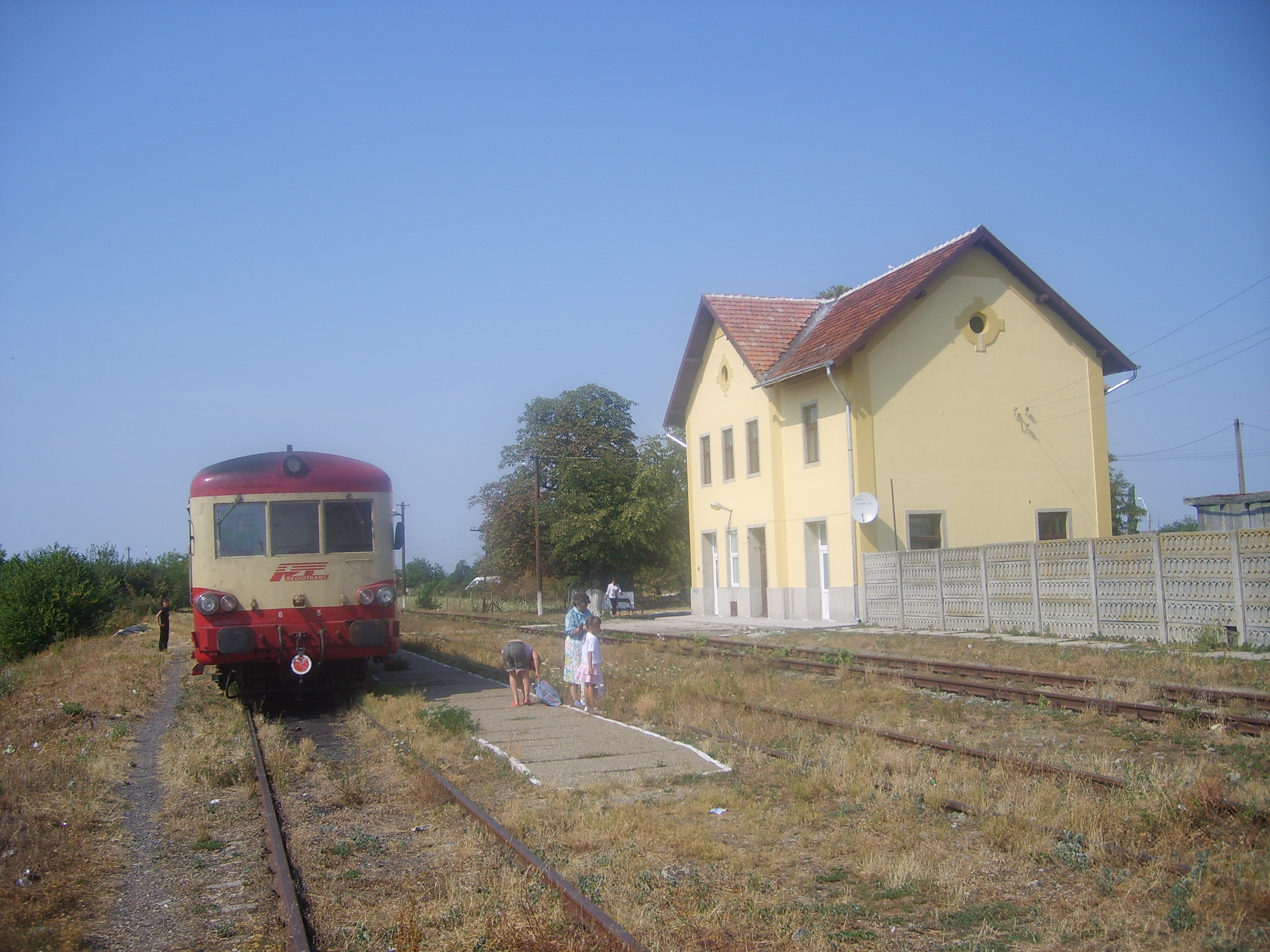
The former train station of Jamu Mare

Jamu Mare is now a railway terminus, but between 1925 and 1930, trains would pass through it all the way to Vršac in present-day Serbia. The rail station is currently closed, without service.

Four county roads run through the commune.

== Notable people ==
- Ioachim Miloia (1897–1940), painter, philosopher and philologist
