= Denta =

- Commune
- Location in Timiș County

- Location in Romania
- Coordinates: 45°21′N 21°15′E
- Country: Romania
- County: Timiș

Government
  - Mayor (2024–2028): Petru Tapanov (PSD)
- Area: 91.4 km^{2} (35.3 sq mi)
- Population (2021-12-01): 2,800
  - Density: 31/km^{2} (79/sq mi)
- Time zone: UTC+02:00 (EET)
  - Summer (DST): UTC+03:00 (EEST)
- Postal code: 307145–307148
- Vehicle reg.: TM
- Website: www.primaria-denta.ro

Denta (Hungarian: Denta; German: Denta; Serbian: Дента, romanized: Denta; Banat Bulgarian: Dénta) is a commune in Timiș County, Romania. It is composed of four villages: Breștea, Denta (commune seat), Rovinița Mare and Rovinița Mică.

== Geography ==
Denta is located in the southwest of Timiș County, about 40 km (25 mi) south of Timișoara and 5 km (3.1 mi) south of Deta, the nearest town. It is crossed by the river Bârzava, canalized from Denta to Serbia.

== History ==
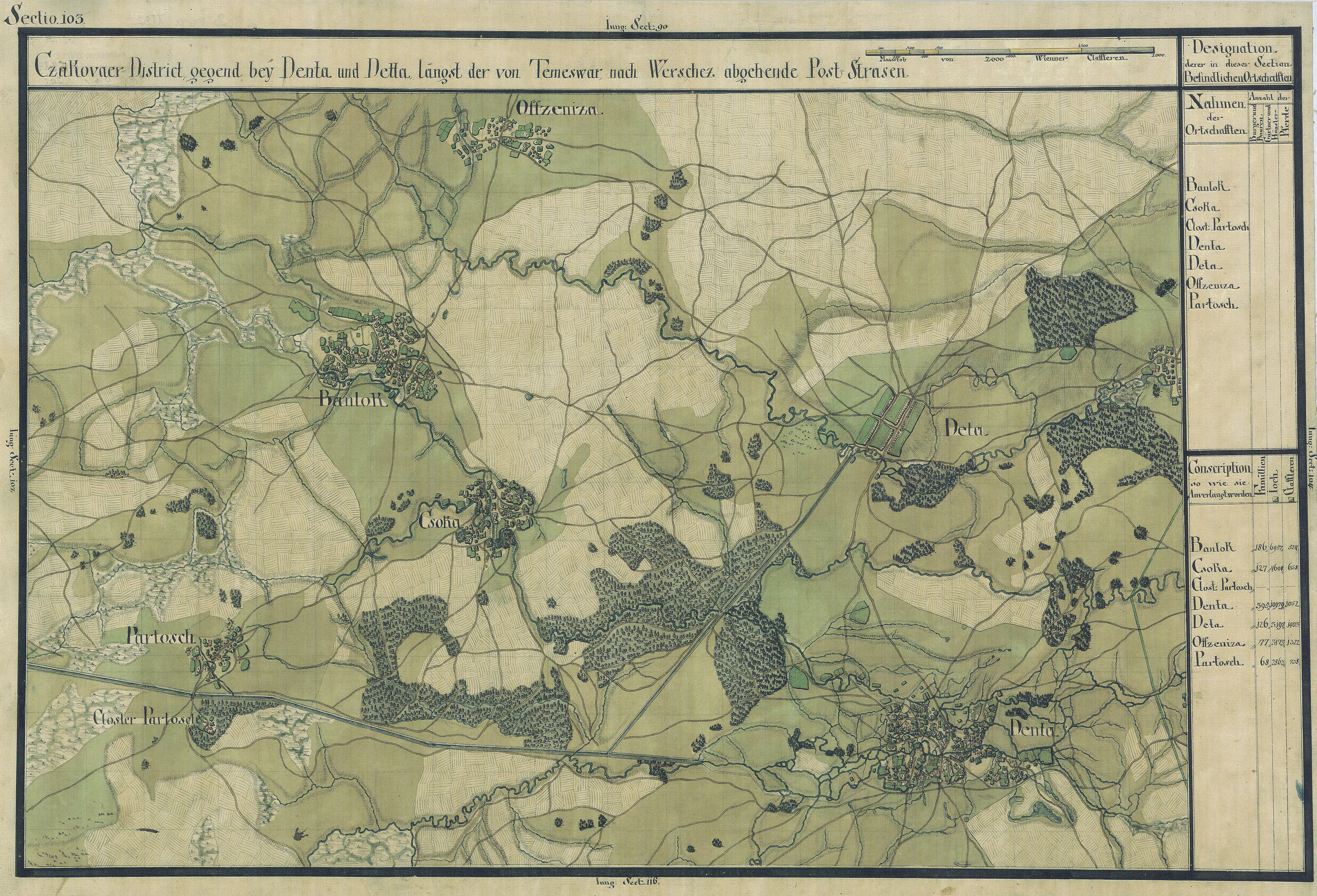
Ciacova District with the village of Denta in the Josephinische Landesaufnahme of 1769–1772

Denta was first mentioned in 1322 (Dench), when it belonged to Krassó County. The settlement is however much older. It is assumed that between Deta and Denta there was the Roman castrum of Potula, through which passed the Roman road connecting Canonia (Vršac) to Zurobara (probably Timișoara). Several Roman vestiges were discovered here, including a border stone. Béla IV of Hungary would have built a fortress here in 1241. Thus, after the retreat of the Tatars, there were several fortresses in the area, including Denta. In the 16th century, when Banat was a Turkish eyalet, Denta was an Ottoman fortress that belonged to the Eyalet of Temeşvar. The plague epidemics of the 17th century also affected Denta. Turkish scholar Evliya Çelebi recalls the Denta Fortress in 1660. He says that it is "placed on the bank of Timiș River with reinforcements in four corners. The fortress is guarded by a captain with 50 soldiers. It has a military depot, a mosque, a restaurant and a few small shops" and that "there are many fruitful gardens in the fortress". The Ottoman rule ends in 1716, when Prince Eugene of Savoy enters Timișoara. Consequently the Turkish troops withdraw from the Denta Fortress, which thus comes under the rule of the Austrian Empire. At that time, Denta had about 100 houses. In 1720, the first colonizations with Germans began. In order to ensure their religious service, the Roman Catholic parish was established in 1724. Thus, until the outbreak of the Austro-Turkish War of 1737, 37 German families lived in Denta. In 1745 the first Bulgarian families moved here. In the same year, the construction of the Bârzava Canal begins. On 15 February 1796, Denta received the right to hold weekly fairs.

Breștea was founded in 1842 by around 110 families of Roman Catholic Banat Bulgarians from Dudeștii Vechi. Each head of household received a lot of house and 11 jugers of arable land. After 1880 part of the Bulgarian population returned to Bulgaria, where they founded the village of Bardarski Geran. The Bulgarians built a Roman Catholic church in 1902 and an oratory around the same year.

The first recorded mention of Rovinița Mare dates from 1288, under the name Humur. The census of 1717 recorded it with 60 houses and as part of the district of Ciacova. Rovinița Mare became the property of the Austrian Aerarium, and in 1779 German settlers were brought here. At the same time, rice cultivation begins in the village. Later, Hungarian settlers are brought here. Towards the end of the 19th century, they outnumbered the Romanians, while the Germans remained a smaller community. South of Rovinița Mare, 80 families of German settlers founded Rovinița Mică in 1895. The land was made available to them by the Aerarium. The villages were originally known as Omor and Omoru Mic, the Romanianized versions of the Hungarian Omor and Kisomor, respectively. These names were changed by Decree no. 799/1964, since the communist authorities deemed them strange (in Romanian, omor means "murder").

== Demographics ==
Ethnic composition (2021)
1. Romanians (64.0%)
2. Bulgarians (13.2%)
3. Hungarians (6.00%)
4. Serbs (3.35%)
5. Roma (2.96%)
6. Unknown (8.82%)
7. Others (1.66%)
Religious composition (2021)
1. Orthodox (58.1%)
2. Roman Catholics (22.5%)
3. Pentecostals (4.25%)
4. Serbian Orthodox (3.21%)
5. Baptists (2.14%)
6. Unknown (9.28%)
7. Others (0.38%)
8. Irreligious, atheists and agnostics (0.14%)

Denta had a population of 2,800 inhabitants at the 2021 census, down 6.1% from the 2011 census. Most inhabitants are Romanians (64%), larger minorities being represented by Bulgarians (13.21%), Hungarians (6%), Serbs (3.35%) and Roma (2.96%). For 8.82% of the population, ethnicity is unknown. By religion, most inhabitants are Orthodox (58.1%), but there are also minorities of Roman Catholics (22.5%), Pentecostals (4.25%), Serbian Orthodox (3.21%) and Baptists (2.14%). For 9.28% of the population, religious affiliation is unknown.

Census		Ethnic composition
Year	Population	Romanians	Hungarians	Germans	Roma	Serbs	Bulgarians
1880	4,906	1,396	708	432	–	815	–
1890	5,374	1,437	872	777	–	839	–
1900	5,631	1,559	889	1,129	–	857	–
1910	5,991	1,623	1,048	1,205	–	835	–
1920	5,353	1,567	733	1,133	–	–	–
1930	5,116	1,446	769	1,025	80	651	1,127
1941	5,217	1,717	719	960	–	–	–
1956	4,330	1,653	656	395	–	542	1,081
1966	4,206	1,738	582	303	10	458	1,112
1977	3,899	1,820	521	94	26	368	949
1992	3,187	1,723	389	42	79	207	709
2002	3,187	1,940	314	25	83	172	605
2011	2,982	1,885	257	30	71	127	479
2021	2,800	1,792	168	24	83	94	370

== Politics and administration ==
The commune of Denta is administered by a mayor and a local council composed of 13 councilors. The mayor, Petru Tapanov, from the Social Democratic Party, has been in office since 2021. As from the 2024 local elections, the local council has the following composition by political parties:

Party	Seats	Composition
Social Democratic Party	6	
National Liberal Party	4	
Bulgarian Union of Banat–Romania	1	
Romanian Ecologist Party	1	
Greater Romania Party	1	
