= Berzovia =

- Commune
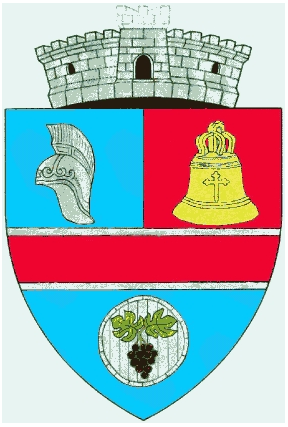
- Coat of arms

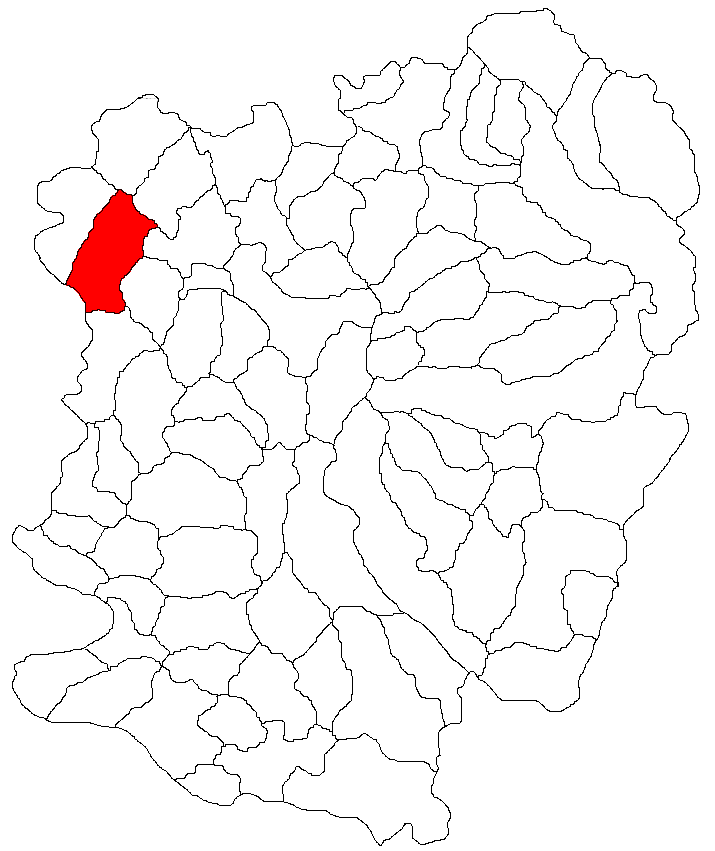
- Location in Caraș-Severin County

- Location in Romania
- Coordinates: 45°26′N 21°38′E
- Country: Romania
- County: Caraș-Severin

Government
  - Mayor (2024–2028): Robert Nosal (PNL)
- Area: 128.27 km^{2} (49.53 sq mi)
- Elevation: 136 m (446 ft)
- Population (2021-12-01): 3,247
  - Density: 25.31/km^{2} (65.56/sq mi)
- Time zone: UTC+02:00 (EET)
  - Summer (DST): UTC+03:00 (EEST)
- Postal code: 327030
- Area code: +(40) 02 55
- Vehicle reg.: CS
- Website: primaria-berzovia.ro

Berzovia (Hungarian: Zsidovin) is a commune in Caraș-Severin County, Banat, Romania with a population of 3,247 as of 2021. It is composed of three villages: Berzovia, Fizeș (Krassófűzes), and Gherteniș (Gertenyes).

The commune is located in the west of Caraș-Severin County, 29 km (18 mi) from Reșița and 74 km (46 mi) from Timișoara. It is crossed by he DN58B national road, which connects Timișoara with Bocșa and Gătaia.

The locality is mentioned on the Tabula Peutingeriana as Berzobia. The Roman fort of Bersobis is located in Berzovia.

Historical population
| Year | Pop. | ±% |
|---|---|---|
| 1880 | 4,839 | — |
| 1910 | 5,449 | +12.6% |
| 1930 | 4,906 | −10.0% |
| 1977 | 5,108 | +4.1% |
| 2002 | 4,165 | −18.5% |
| 2011 | 3,891 | −6.6% |
| 2021 | 3,247 | −16.6% |
Source: Census data

== Notable people ==
- Kornélia Hollósy (1827–1890), soprano
