= Reșița Synagogue =

Neolog synagogue in Reșița, Romania

- Romanian: Sinagoga din Reșița
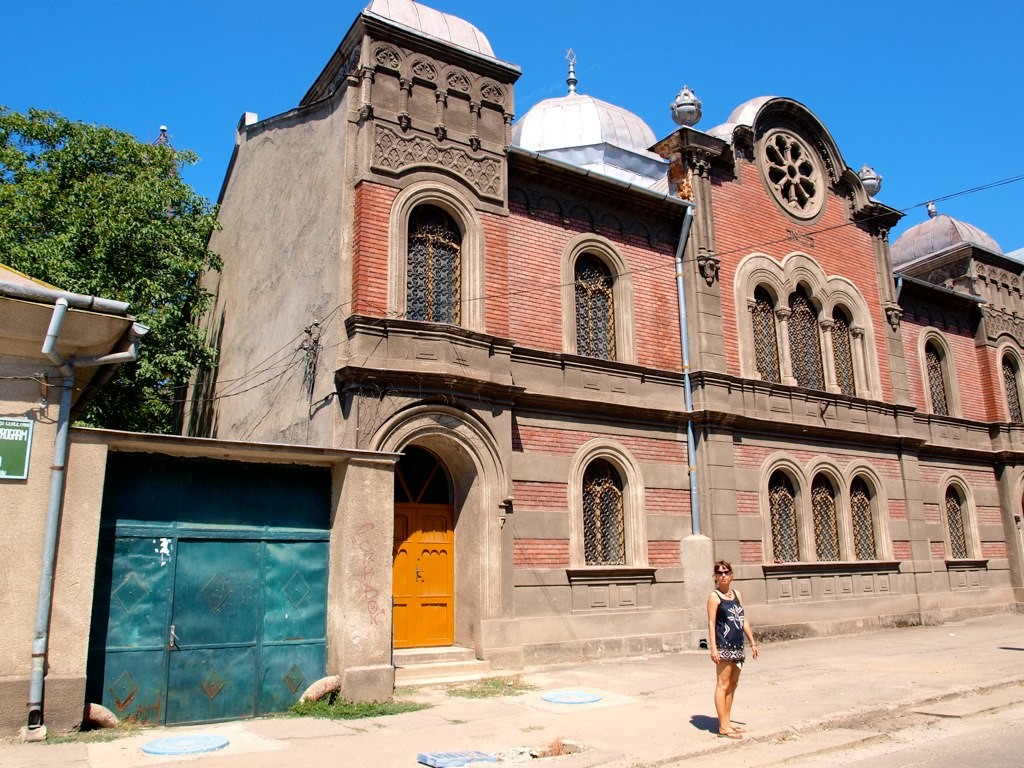
- The synagogue façade, in 2012

- Location of the synagogue in Caraș-Severin County

Religion
- Affiliation: Neolog Judaism
- Rite: Nusach Ashkenaz
- Ecclesiastical or organizational status: Synagogue
- Status: Active

Location
- Location: 8 Mihai Viteazu Street, Reșița, Caraș-Severin County
- Country: Romania
- Interactive map of Reșița Synagogue
- Coordinates: 45°17′34″N 21°53′56″E

Architecture
- Type: Synagogue architecture
- Style: Romanesque Revival
- Groundbreaking: 1878
- Completed: 1880

Specifications
- Dome: Three
- Materials: Brick

Monument istoric
- Official name: Reșița: Sinagogă
- Type: Monumente de arhitectură
- Reference no.: CS-II-m-B-10938

The Reșița Synagogue (Romanian: Sinagoga din Reșița) is a Neolog Jewish congregation and synagogue, located at 8 Mihai Viteazu Street in Reșița, in the Caraș-Severin County of Romania. Designed in the Romanesque Revival style, the synagogue was completed in 1880.

The synagogue is included on the National Register of Historic Monuments in Romania.

== History ==
The synagogue was built in the central part of Reșița, near the Reșița Works, between 1878 and 1880. Restorations were carried out around 1907. In 1940, the Nazi-allied government of dictator Ion Antonescu confiscated the building; it was returned to the local Jewish community in 1947. During the period of communism, it was able to continue functioning without interruption, in its original function. It underwent further renovations in the 1970s. It is still used today, but there are only 68 members of the community.

== Architecture ==
The synagogue was built in the Romanesque Revival style. It is characterized by alternating plaster strips on the facade with brick surfaces. Smaller decorative columns (relief columns) were created on the plastered part. Internal lighting is provided by semi-circular windows and a small rose window in the middle of the facade. (Only one facade of the building is visible from the street.) One smaller dome was placed on each side of the building, and one larger dome was placed in the middle. After 2020, during the new repairs of the monuments financed by public funds, the roof and external facades were targeted.

== See also ==
- History of the Jews in Romania
- List of synagogues in Romania
