= Reșița =

- Municipality
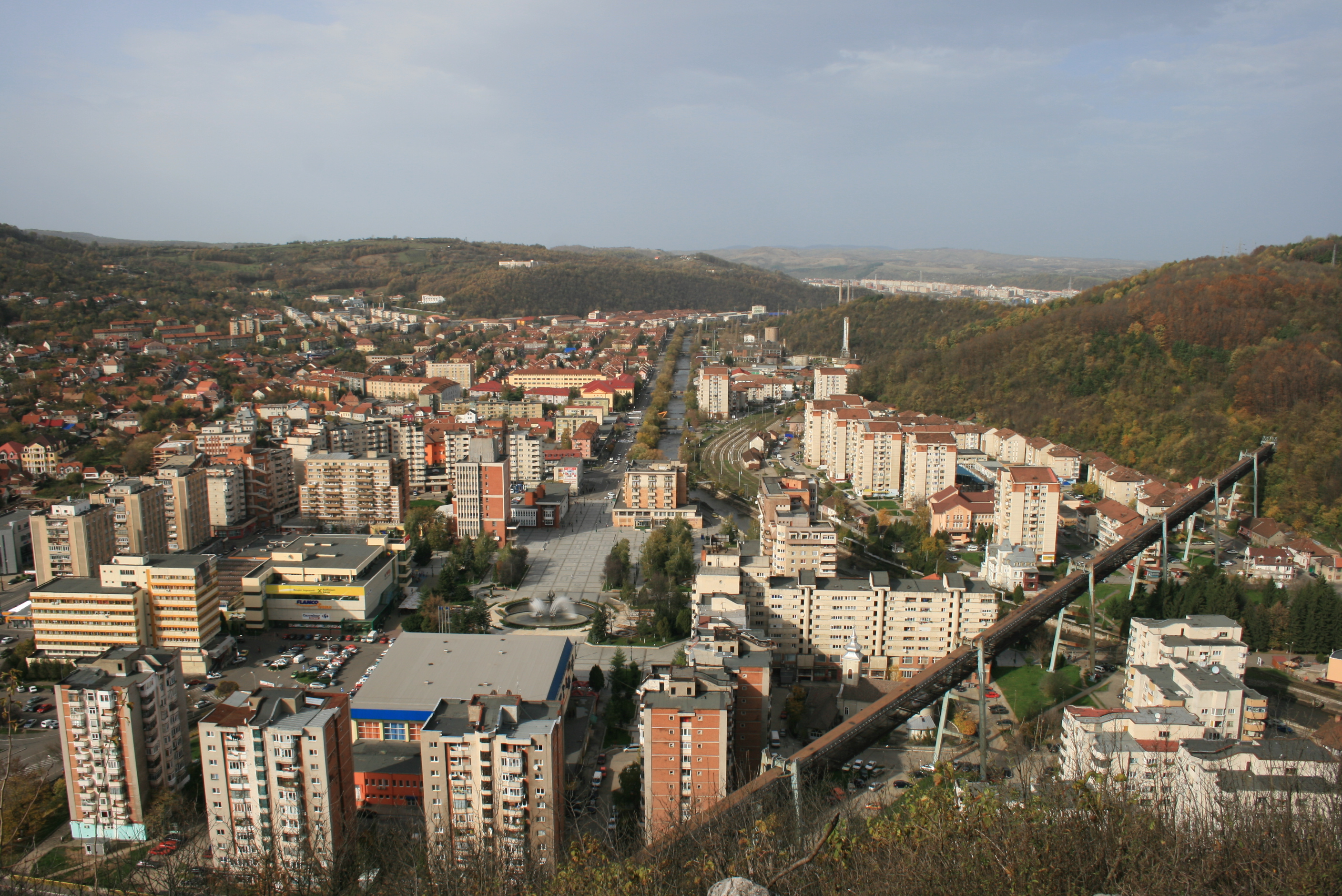
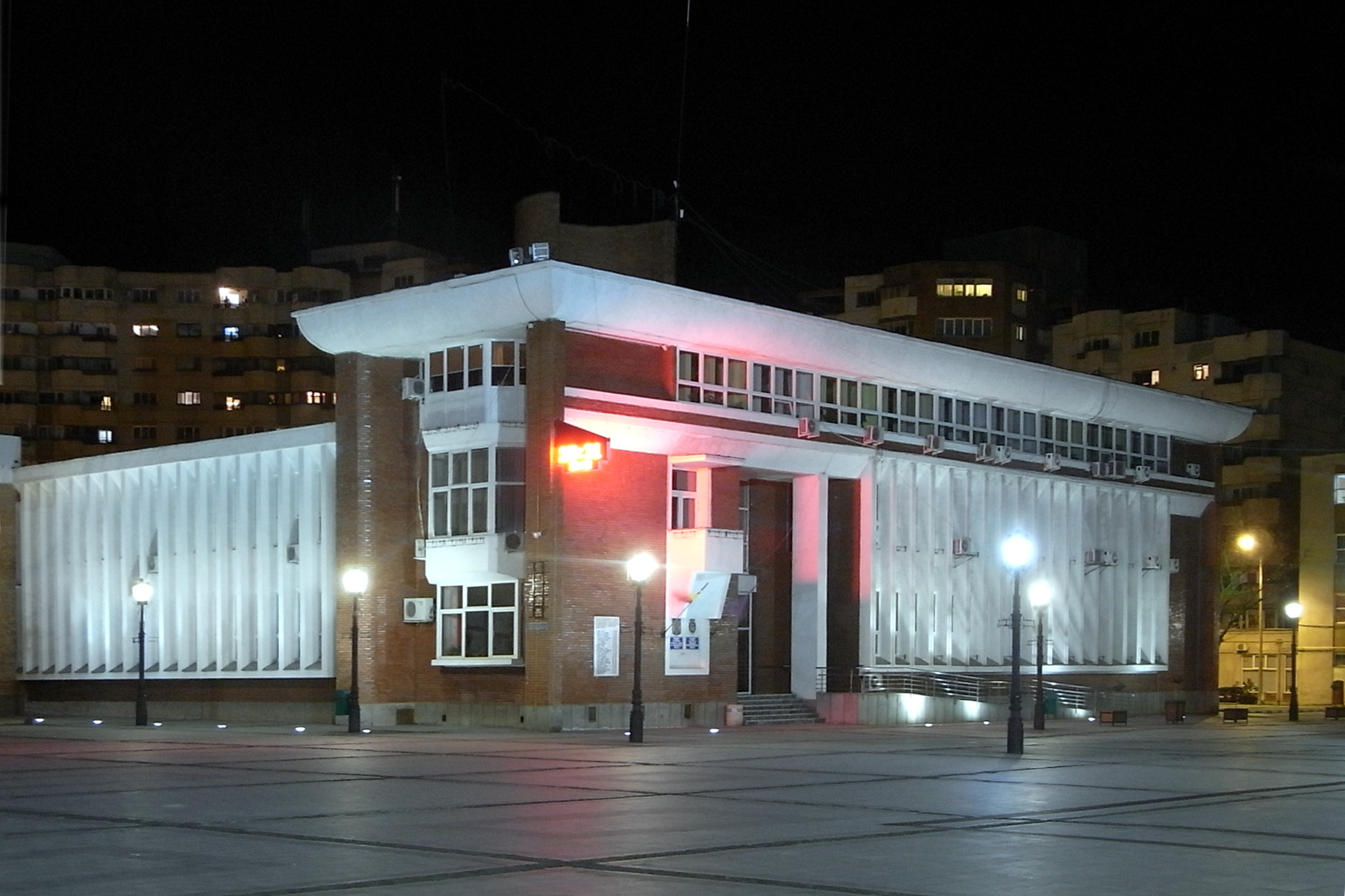
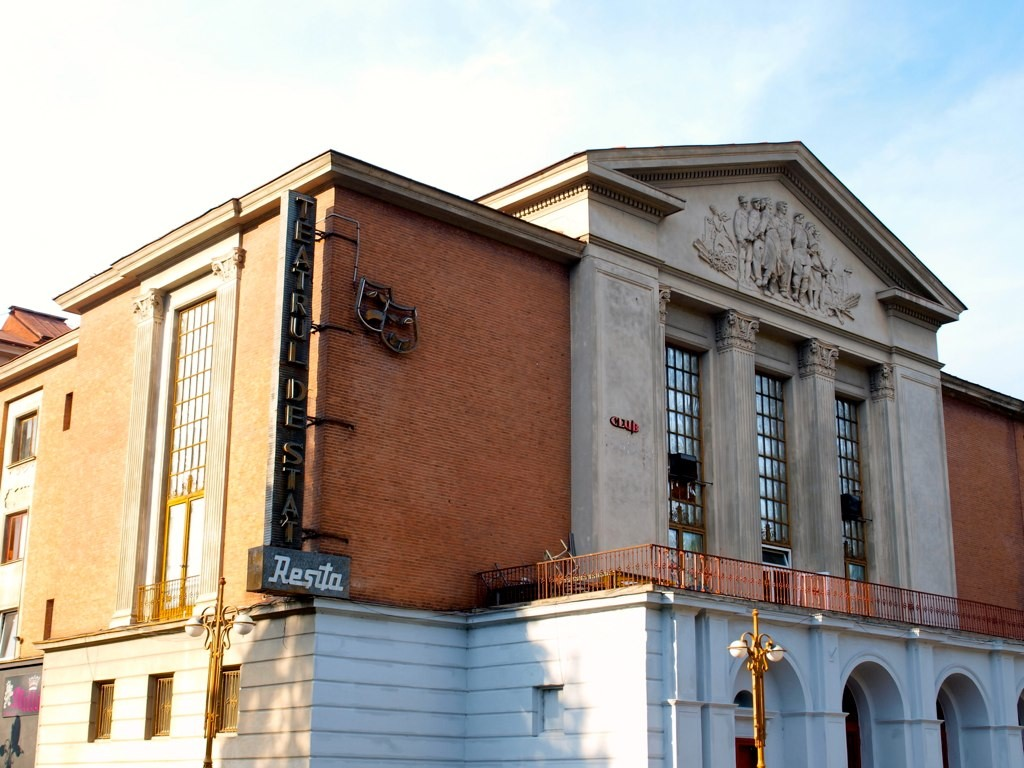
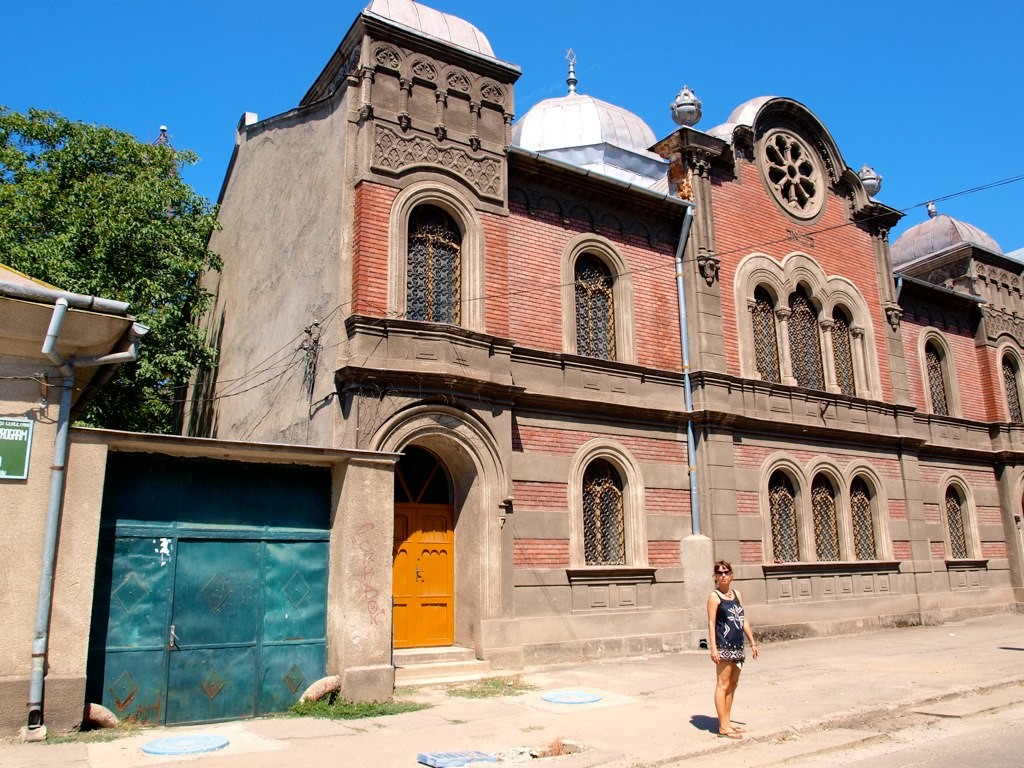
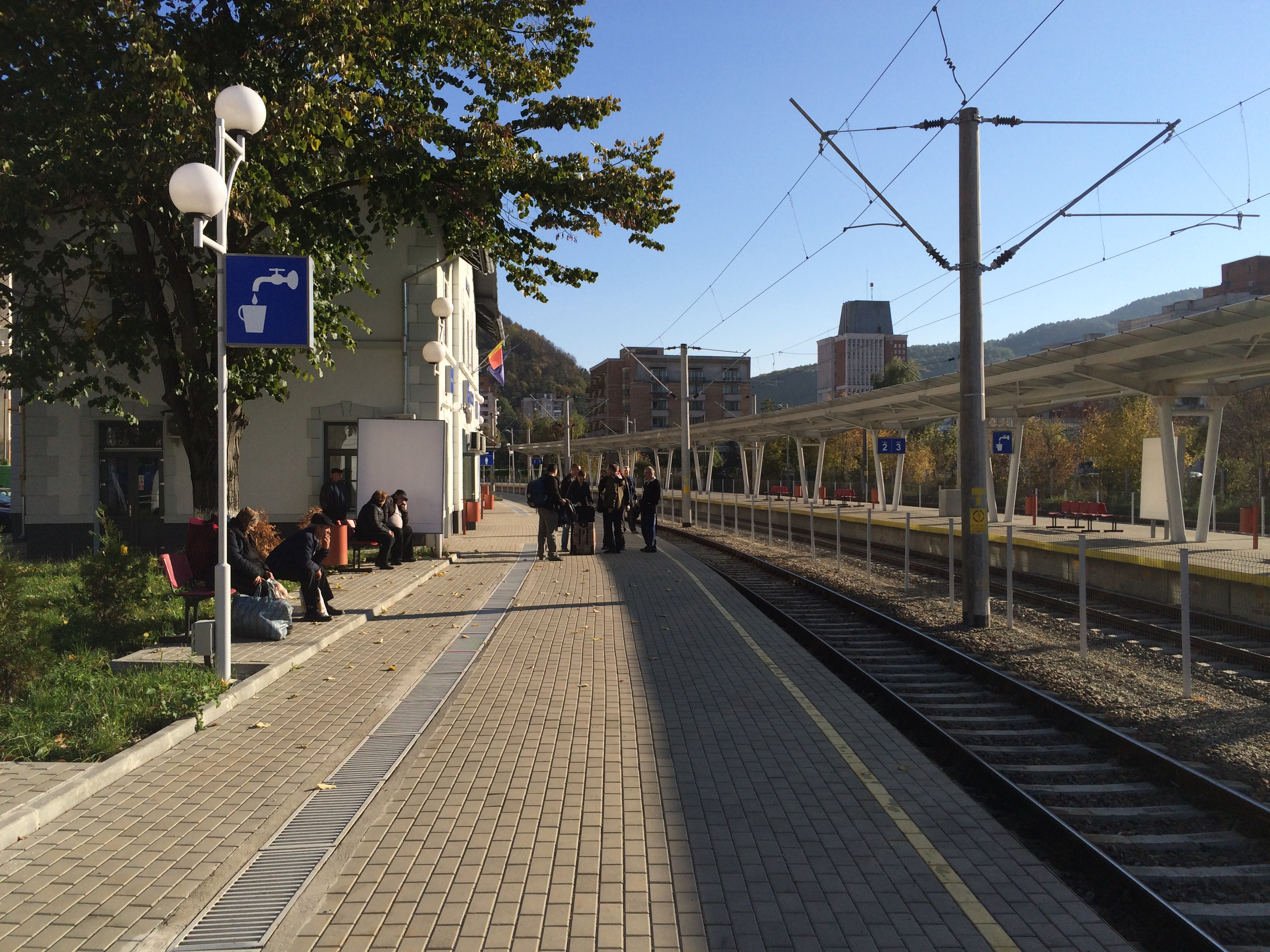
- Reșița downtown and distant view of Govândari neighborhood Town Hall Community center Synagogue Railway station

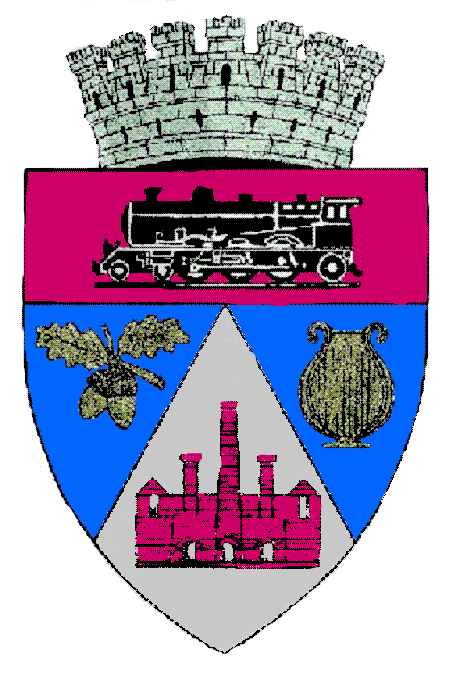
- Coat of arms

- Location in Caraș-Severin County

- Location in Romania
- Coordinates: 45°18′0″N 21°53′25″E
- Country: Romania
- County: Caraș-Severin

Government
  - Mayor (2024–2028): Ioan Popa (PNL)
- Area: 197.65 km^{2} (76.31 sq mi)
- Elevation: 208 m (682 ft)
- Population (2021-12-01): 58,393
  - Density: 295.44/km^{2} (765.18/sq mi)
- Time zone: UTC+02:00 (EET)
  - Summer (DST): UTC+03:00 (EEST)
- Postal code: 320011–320236
- Area code: (+40) 02 55
- Vehicle reg.: CS
- Website: www.primariaresita.ro

Reșița (pronounced [ˈreʃit͡sa]; German: Reschitz; Hungarian: Resicabánya; Croatian: Ričica; Czech: Rešice; Serbian: Решица/Rešica; Turkish: Reşçe) is a city in western Romania and the capital of Caraș-Severin County. It is located in the Banat region. The city had a population of 58,393 in 2021. It administers six villages: Câlnic (Kölnök), Cuptoare (Kuptore), Doman (Domány), Moniom (Monyó), Secu (Székul; Sekul), and Țerova (Krassócser).

== Etymology ==
The name of Reșița might come from the Latin recitia, meaning "cold spring", as the historian Nicolae Iorga once suggested, presuming that the Romans gave this name to Reșița, from a water spring on the Doman valley. A much more plausible version, according to Iorgu Iordan, would be that the name is actually coming from a Slavic word: people living in the neighbouring village of Carașova 15 km (9.3 mi) away, referring to this place, that in those days was a similar village to theirs, as being "u rečice" (at the creek). It can also be noted that almost all Slavic countries have places with the name of Rečice (pronounced Recițe in Romanian).

== History ==
Historically, the town has its origins in the 15th century under the name of Rechyoka and Rechycha. Archaeological research found traces of habitation going back to the Neolithic, Dacian, and Roman eras. In the Middle Ages, the area was part of the Kingdom of Hungary. Following the death of the Jagiellon King of Hungary Louis II at the Battle of Mohács in 1526, the Hungarian crown would be inherited by the Habsburg monarchy, but this was contested by much of the Hungarian nobility, resulting in the formation of the Eastern Hungarian Kingdom, encompassing much of Transylvania and the Banat. In 1553, the area was incorporated into Temeşvar Eyalet of the Ottoman Empire. The town is mentioned in 1673 under the name of Reszinitza, whose citizens paid taxes to the Ottoman bey (governor) in Timișoara (Turkish: Temeşvar; Hungarian: Temesvár).

Following the Battle of Vienna in 1683, Ottoman influence north of the Danube would contract. and the Habsburg and by the years 1690–1700, it was mentioned as being part of the District of Bocșa together with other towns in the Bârzava Valley. In the Habsburg-Ottoman War of 1716–1718, Prince Eugene of Savoy would conquer the region for the Habsburgs. The Habsburgs established the Banat of Temeswar and began fortifying the region as a Military Frontier. The town was referenced in the conscription acts of 1717 under the name of Retziza. Under Empress Maria Theresa, in 1751 Reșița and much of the northern Banat was detached from the Banat Military Frontier and transferred from military to civil administration. On 3 July 1771, it became an important metal-manufacturing center in the region. The foundation of the industrial Reșița was laid with the establishment of factories near the villages of Reșița Română (Reschiza Kamerală or Oláh Resitza) and Reșița Montană (Eisenwerk Reschitza, Német(h) Reschitza or Resiczbánya). Reșița Montană was at first inhabited by Romanians..

Even before Hungary fell under Habsburg Rule, the old kings of Hungary had encouraged Germans to settle in Transylvania and the Banat. In 1224, King Andrew II of Hungary issued the Diploma Andreanum, granting provisional autonomy to the Transylvania Saxons and their fortified towns in Northeastern and Southeastern Transylvania (German: Siebenbürgen). For much of the Early modern period the Banat had become a dangerous border region caught between two waring Empires and would experience periods of devastation and depopulation. However, in the 18th century, the expansion of Habsburg authority, its efforts to fortify the region, and the movement of the frontier southward greatly increased regional security, making the Banat once again suitable for civilian settlement. Besides the installation of a civil administration, the Theresian period (1740–1780) would see large-scale efforts to recruit settlers and repopulate the region, resulting in a large influx of German settlers, especially from Swabia. In 1776, 70 German families settled Reșița (German: Reschitz). In 1880, Germans represented the majority of the city's population.

Following the First World War, the collapse of the Habsburg Monarchy in 1918 and the subsequent Treaty of Trianon in 1920 would result in Reșița and much of the Banat being annexed by the Kingdom of Romania. However, in the Interwar period, Germans would continue to constitute the majority of the population. In 1941, Reșița had 12,096 Germans residents, 9,453 Romanian residents, and 1,861 Hungarian residents. Between 1910 and 1925, Reșița had the status of a rural area, and in 1925, it was declared a town thanks to its development into a powerful industrial location in modern Romania. In 1968, it became a municipality.

After the Romanian Revolution of 1989, Reșița lost most of its importance and its economy faced a recession, along with the Romanian economy. The population also declined, dropping from 110,000 in 1989 to 86,000 in 2006. After the fall of communism, the Reșița Steelworks (Combinatul Siderurgic Reșița, CSR) was bought by an American investor who brought the factory just one step away from bankruptcy. Today the steelworks are run by TMK Europe GmbH, a German subsidiary of OAO TMK, Moscow, which has projects of modernization for the CSR.

In 2022 it was inducted into UNESCO's Global Network of Learning Cities (GNLC).

== The city ==
The city is situated along the Bârzava River, which meets the Doman River in the centre of town. Most of the urban area is concentrated along the Bârzava, with some development—mostly residential—in the surrounding hills.

It is made of three main areas, two former villages that were very close: Romanian Reșița (Romanian: Reșița Română or Olah Resitza) and Highland Reșița (Romanian: Reșița Montană, Eisenwerk Reschitza or Nemet Reschitza); a new area, recently built, made of tower blocks on a wide opened meadow, called Bârzava's Meadow.

Neighbourhoods of Reșița
Neighbourhood name	Official name	Former name	Occasional name	Additional name
New City	Bârzava's Meadow	New Reșița	North Reșița	Govândari
entirely built after 1965, under the Socialist Romania, it contains 4 zone areas around a main boulevard, called microraions, a legacy term of the former Soviet Union: Micro I; Micro II; Micro III; Micro IV
Downtown	City Centre	Romanian Reșița	South Reșița	N/A
rebuilt after the installment of the Socialist Romania in 1947, it contains the following zone areas: Centre – Civic center, rarely City centre; Doman – The Doman's Valley (Romanian: Valea Domanului); Luncă – The Pomost's Meadow (Romanian: Lunca Pomostului); Moroasa made of Moroasa I and II; Romanian Reșița (Romanian: Reșița Română); The Clear Glade Hill or The Clear Glade Colony (Romanian: Colonia Poiana Golului)
Old City	Commuter belt (Romanian: Muncitoresc)	Highland Reșița	Old Reșița	N/A
it has the oldest buildings of the city, mostly houses, and it contains the following zone areas: New Driglovăț (Romanian: Driglovățul Nou); Old Driglovăț (Romanian: Driglovățul Vechi); Weir (Romanian: Stăvila); Minda; Bașovăț; Lend, Marginea Lend or just Marginea

The Civic centre of the city has been partially renovated in 2006. An important point of attraction located in the City Centre is the impressive kinetic fountain designed by Constantin Lucaci, built in the communist era.

There are also important cultural points in Reșița that have been renewed in 2006, including the Concrete School (Școala de Beton), Downtown, and the Polyvalent Hall (Sala Polivalentă).

The Reșița Steam Locomotive Museum features Romania's first locomotive built in Romania at Reșița in 1872, and is located in the open-air museum in the (Romanian: Triaj) neighborhood.

An important iron and steel center, Reșița is the site of blast furnaces, iron foundries, and plants producing electrical appliances, chemicals and machinery (see Reșița works).

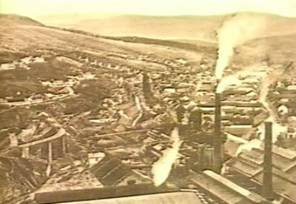
Local factory in the early 20th century

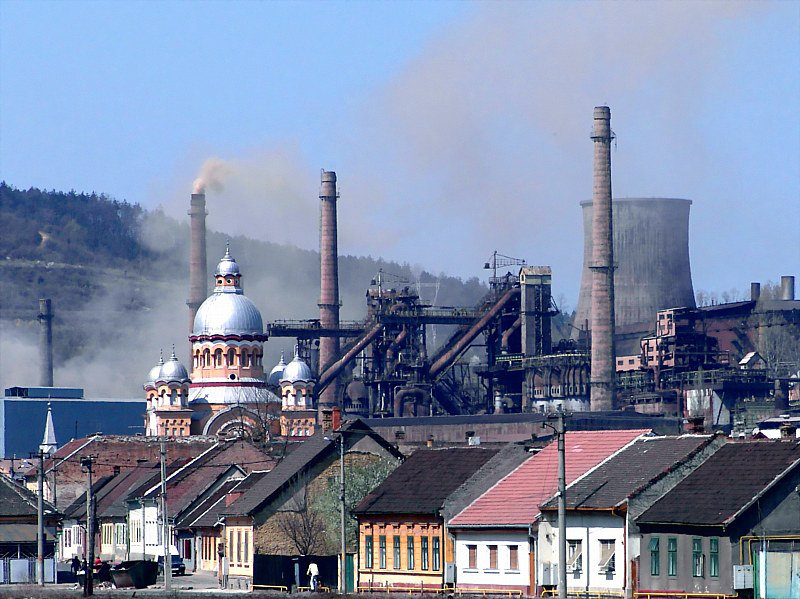
Small part of the Reșița Steelworks

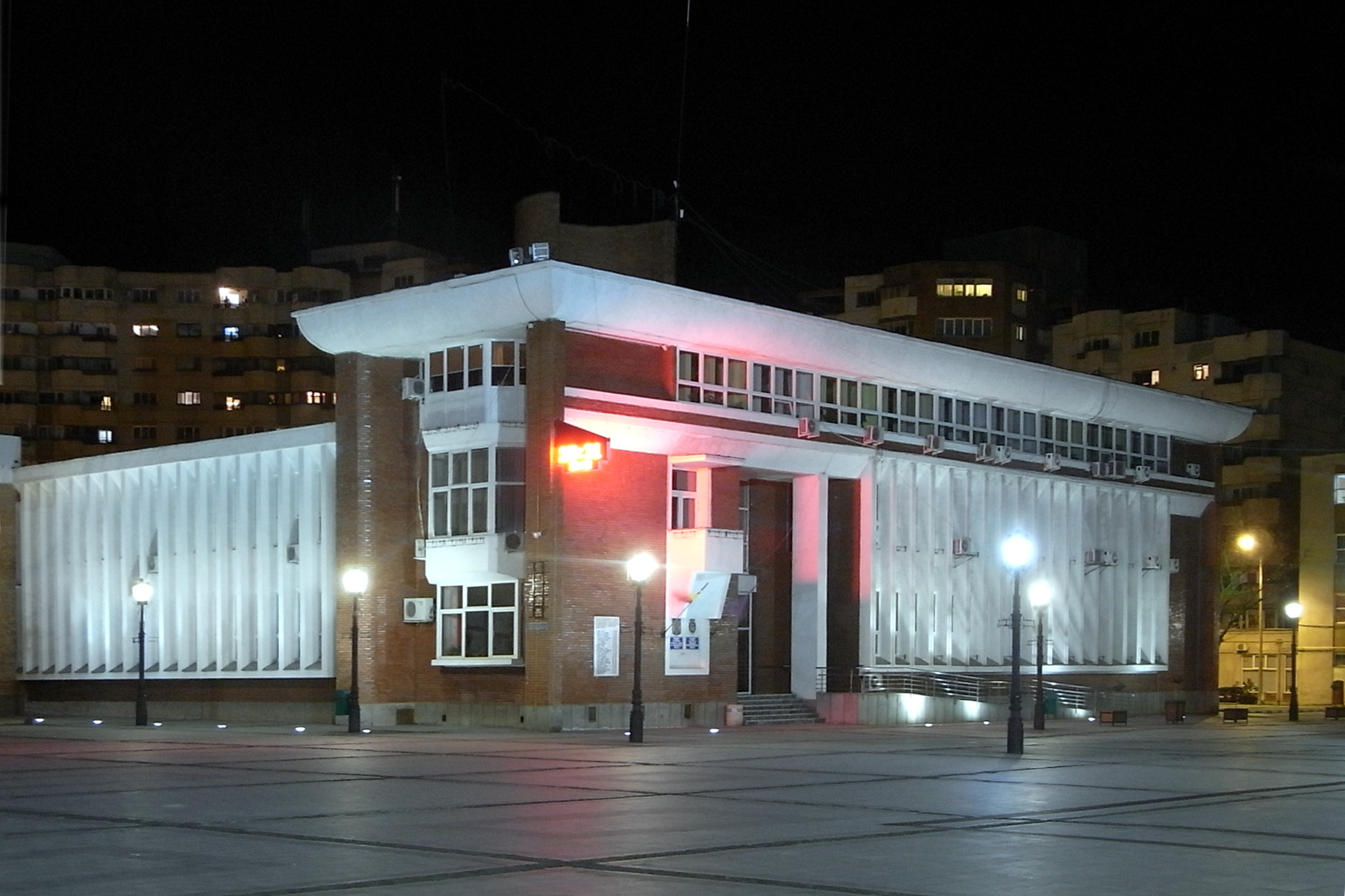
City Hall in the City Centre

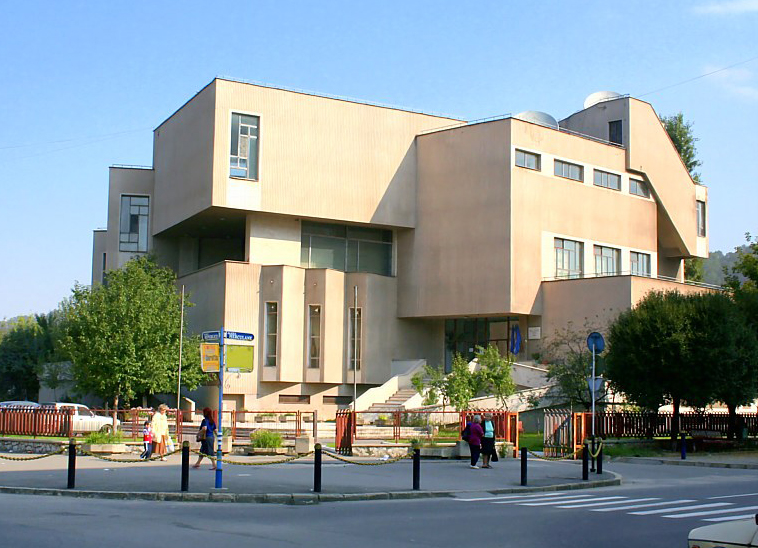
Museum of Highland Banat

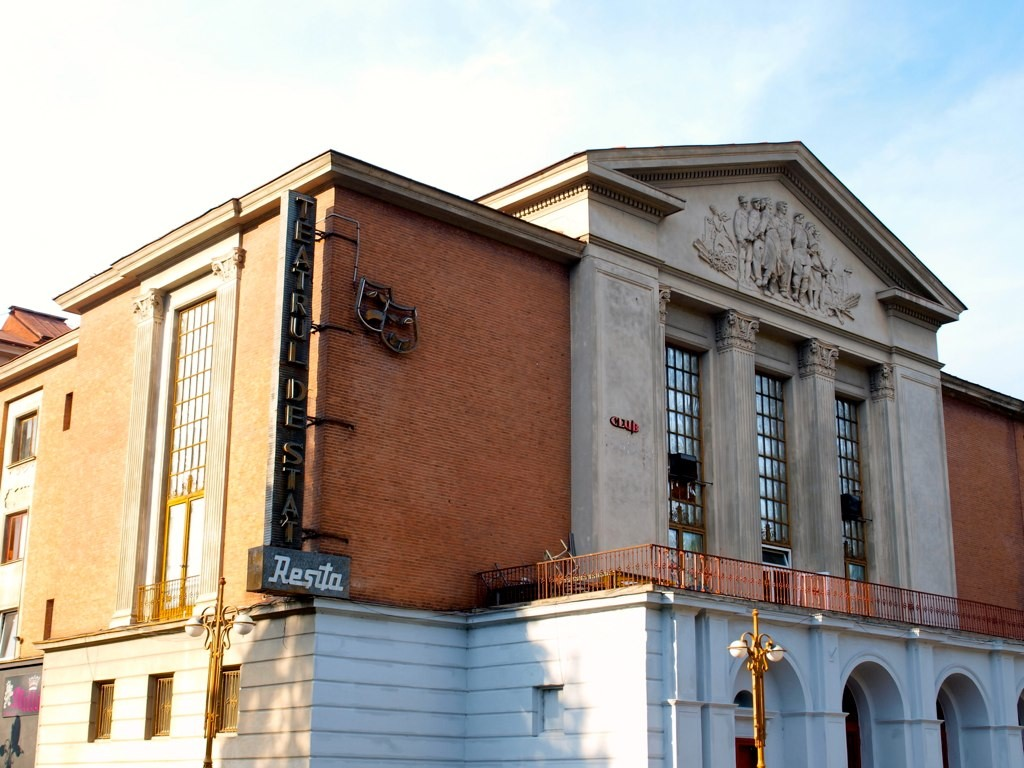
Community Centre

The city is a hub for leisure locations all around. Locations near Reșița include the ski resort at Semenic, Lake Gozna, Lake Secu, the Trei Ape Lake (Three Rivers Lake), Gărâna, Brebu, and Văliug.

== Demographics ==
Historical population

Year	Pop.	±%
1880	14,616	—
1890	18,448	+26.2%
1910	23,625	+28.1%
1930	19,868	−15.9%
1948	24,895	+25.3%
1956	41,234	+65.6%

Year	Pop.	±%
1966	56,653	+37.4%
1977	84,786	+49.7%
1992	96,918	+14.3%
2002	84,026	−13.3%
2011	73,282	−12.8%
2021	58,393	−20.3%

At the 2021 census, the city had a population of 58,393. At the 2011 census, there were 65,509 people living within the city of Reșița, making it the 29th largest city in Romania. The ethnic makeup is as follows:

Census		Ethnic Structure
Year	Population	Romanians	Germans	Hungarians	Serbians	Croatians	Slovaks	Czechs	Ukrainians	Romany	Other
1880	14,616	6,557	5,428	592							2039
1890	18,448	6,876	8,150	967							2455
1910	23,625	8,465	10,471	2,814							1875
1930	19,868	5,851	10,637	2,127	36	36	191	191			797
1935	20,085
1966	55,752	39,760	9,846	4,008	289	289	239	712			610
1992	95,216	79,518	5,045	4,009	936	296	167	205			2,340
2002	84,026	74,584	2,696	3,034	580	535	102	140			2,355
2011	65,509	59,994 (90.02%)	1,323 (1.98%)	1,682 (2.52%)	365 (0.54%)	313 (0.47%)			714	1,019 (1.53%)	698 (1.06%)

== Religion ==
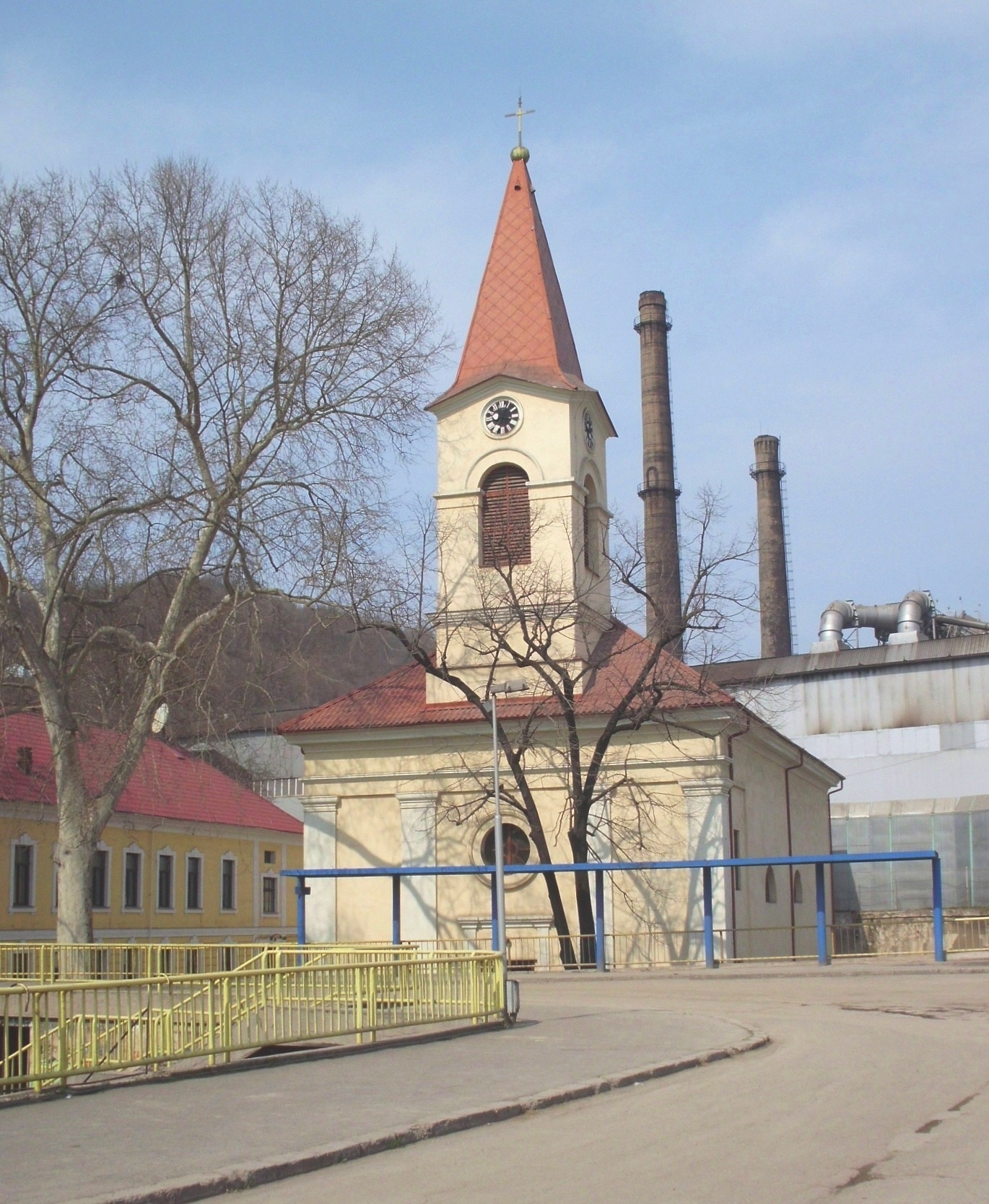
Catholic Church in Reşiţa dedicated to Our Lady of the Snows

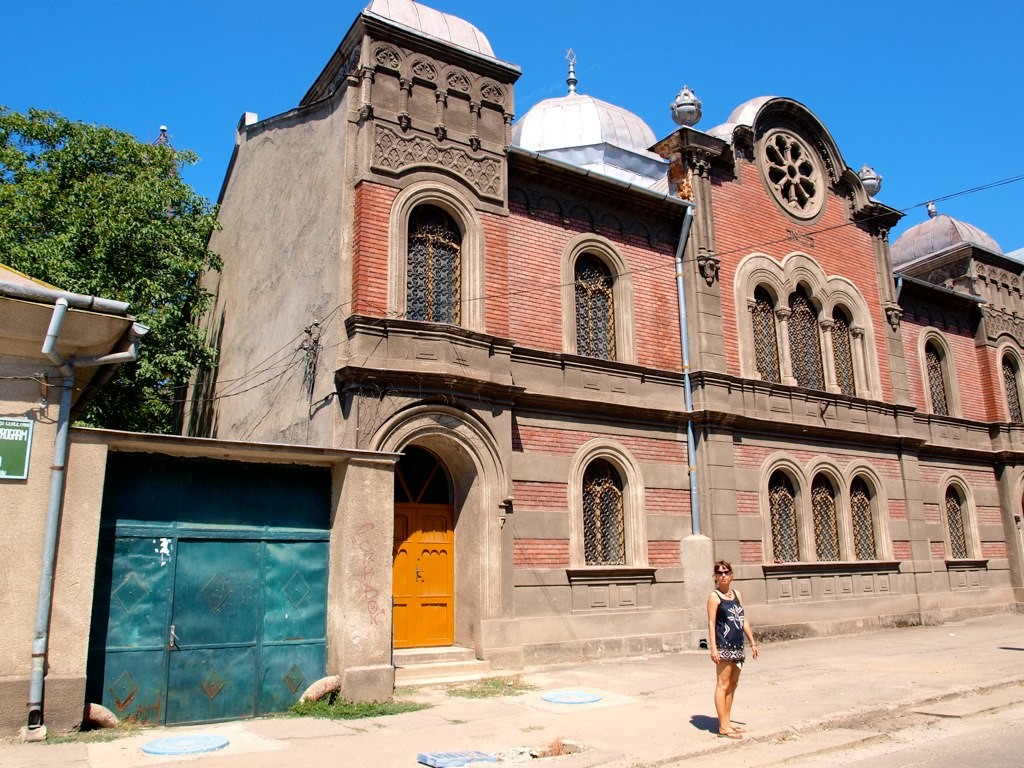
The Reșița Synagogue

According to the 1880 Austro-Hungarian census, the residents were:

- 6,569 Roman Catholics
- 2,129 Orthodox adherents
- 304 Lutherans
- 163 Eastern Catholics
- 126 Reformed adherents
- 72 Judaism adherents

Today there are many of the old churches in service and new ones:

- Roman Catholic churches
  - Saint Mary of the Snows Church (Old City) (Romanian: Biserica Maria Zăpezii)
  - Trinity Sunday Church (Govândari) (Romanian: Biserica Duminica Preasfintei Treimi)
- Orthodox churches
  - New Joseph from Partoș Church (City Center) (Romanian: Sfântul Ierarh Iosif cel Nou de la Partoș)
  - Pentecost Church (Govândari) (Romanian: Pogorârea Sfântului Duh)
  - Saints Peter and Paul Church (Govândari) (Romanian: Sfinții Apostoli Petru și Pavel)
  - Saints Peter and Paul Church (Lend) (Romanian: Sfinții Apostoli Petru și Pavel)
  - Saint Basil the Great Church (Moroasa) (Romanian: Sfântul Vasile cel Mare)
  - Church of the Holy Archangels Michael and Gabriel (Moroasa) (Romanian: Sfinții Arhangheli Mihail și Gavriil)
- Orthodox cathedral
  - Adormirea Maicii D-lui (Old City)
  - Schimbarea la Față (Govândari)
- Lutheran church (Old City) – built in the 19th century
- Reformed church (Old City)
- Eastern Catholic church (Govândari)
- Synagogue (Old City)

== Climate ==
Reșița has a humid continental climate (Cfb in the Köppen climate classification).

Climate data for Reșița
Month	Jan	Feb	Mar	Apr	May	Jun	Jul	Aug	Sep	Oct	Nov	Dec	Year
Mean daily maximum °C (°F)	2.5 (36.5)	4.4 (39.9)	9.4 (48.9)	15.1 (59.2)	19.5 (67.1)	22.8 (73.0)	24.7 (76.5)	25 (77)	20 (68)	15.1 (59.2)	9.9 (49.8)	3.8 (38.8)	14.4 (57.8)
Daily mean °C (°F)	−1.1 (30.0)	0.5 (32.9)	4.8 (40.6)	10.2 (50.4)	14.8 (58.6)	18.3 (64.9)	20.2 (68.4)	20.3 (68.5)	15.5 (59.9)	10.4 (50.7)	5.8 (42.4)	0.5 (32.9)	10.0 (50.0)
Mean daily minimum °C (°F)	−4.4 (24.1)	−3.3 (26.1)	-0 (32)	4.7 (40.5)	9.4 (48.9)	13 (55)	14.9 (58.8)	15.1 (59.2)	11 (52)	6.2 (43.2)	2.4 (36.3)	−2.4 (27.7)	5.6 (42.0)
Average precipitation mm (inches)	74 (2.9)	69 (2.7)	78 (3.1)	102 (4.0)	108 (4.3)	121 (4.8)	105 (4.1)	86 (3.4)	90 (3.5)	72 (2.8)	70 (2.8)	82 (3.2)	1,057 (41.6)
Source: https://en.climate-data.org/europe/romania/caras-severin/resita-844/

== Economy ==
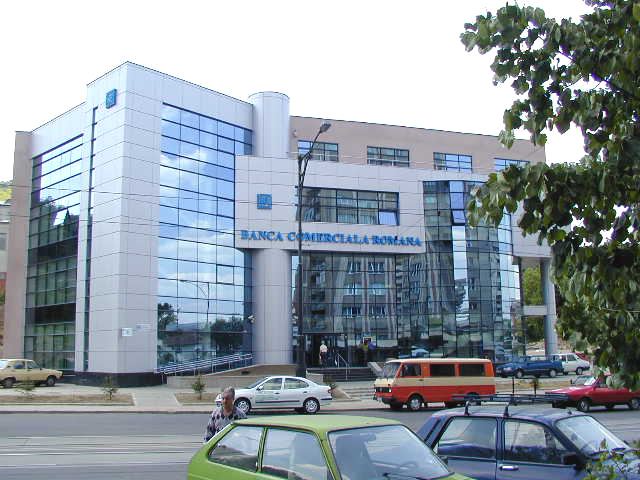
The Banca Comercială Română's building in Reșița

Reșița has long been considered as the second-largest industrial center of Romania. It is an important center in manufacturing steel and vehicle manufacturing. C.S.R. (Combinatul Siderurgic Reșița) and U.C.M.R., the first Romanian factory (Uzina Constructoare de Mașini Reșița). The two are called as Reșița works and are the factories which sustained the city's life for more than 300 years. The first factories were built in 1771, during the reign of Maria Theresa. During the 19th century, the steelworks were known as StEG. After the end of World War I, when Banat became part of Romania, they changed their name again, this time to Uzinele și Domeniile Reșița or UDR (Reșița Works and Domains). Only later, under the Communist regime, did the UDR split into CSR and UCMR.

The economy of Reșița has faced a drawback since 1989, but began recovering as a result of increasing foreign and domestic investment, largely in industry.

- Industry: Automobile industry, Iron industry, texture industry, civilian constructions.
- Agriculture: 1% of the labour force of the city works in agriculture.
- Services: public alimentation, internal and international transport.
- Tourism: 2 tourism societies (Tourist Semenic SA and BIRTA SA).

=== Shopping ===
Reșița currently has 10 supermarkets of which three Carrefour supermarkets, two in the Govândari district (one of them was previously a Billa supermarket) and one in the Nera Shopping Center, three Lidl supermarkets, two Kaufland supermarkets, one near the road entrance from Bocșa and one in Lunca Bârzăvii and two Penny supermarkets, one situated in Lunca Bârzăvii and the other one in Triaj. The Shopping Center of Reșița is called Nera Shopping Center located in the Civic Centre. There are a variety of companies operating in Reșița, offering almost everything a normal consumer would need. There are some other shopping centres currently under development such as Reșița Shopping City located on the site of the old thermal plant, or the mall of the Mociur area.

== Transport ==
=== Public transport ===
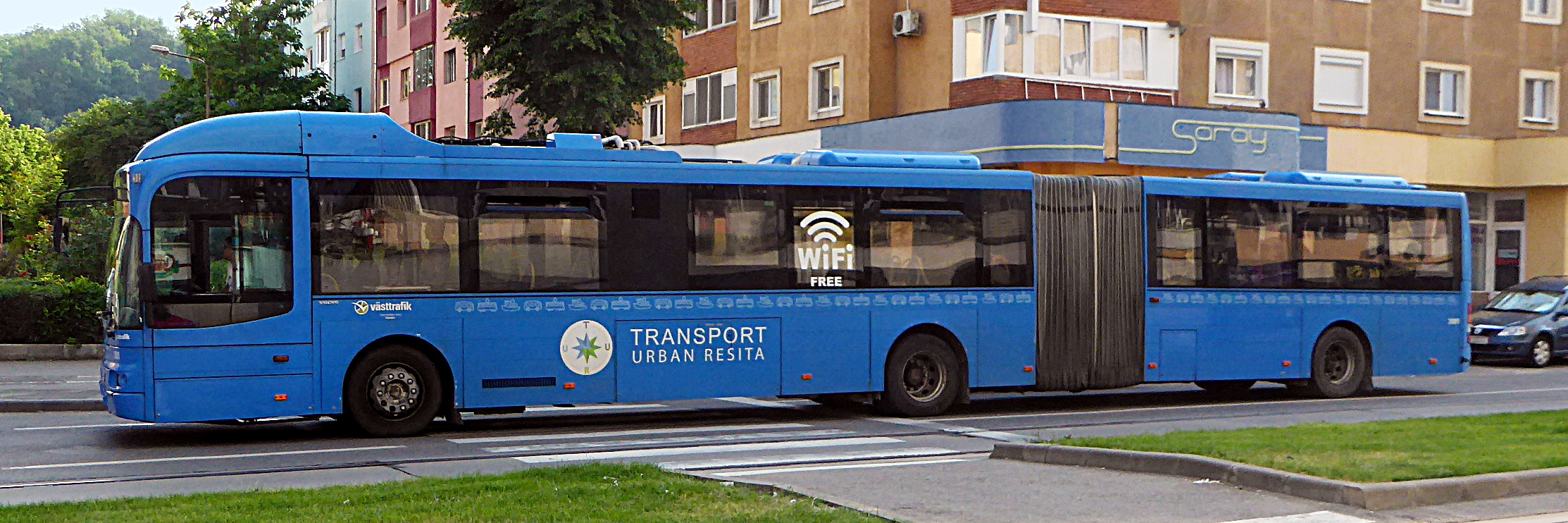
A bus in Reșița

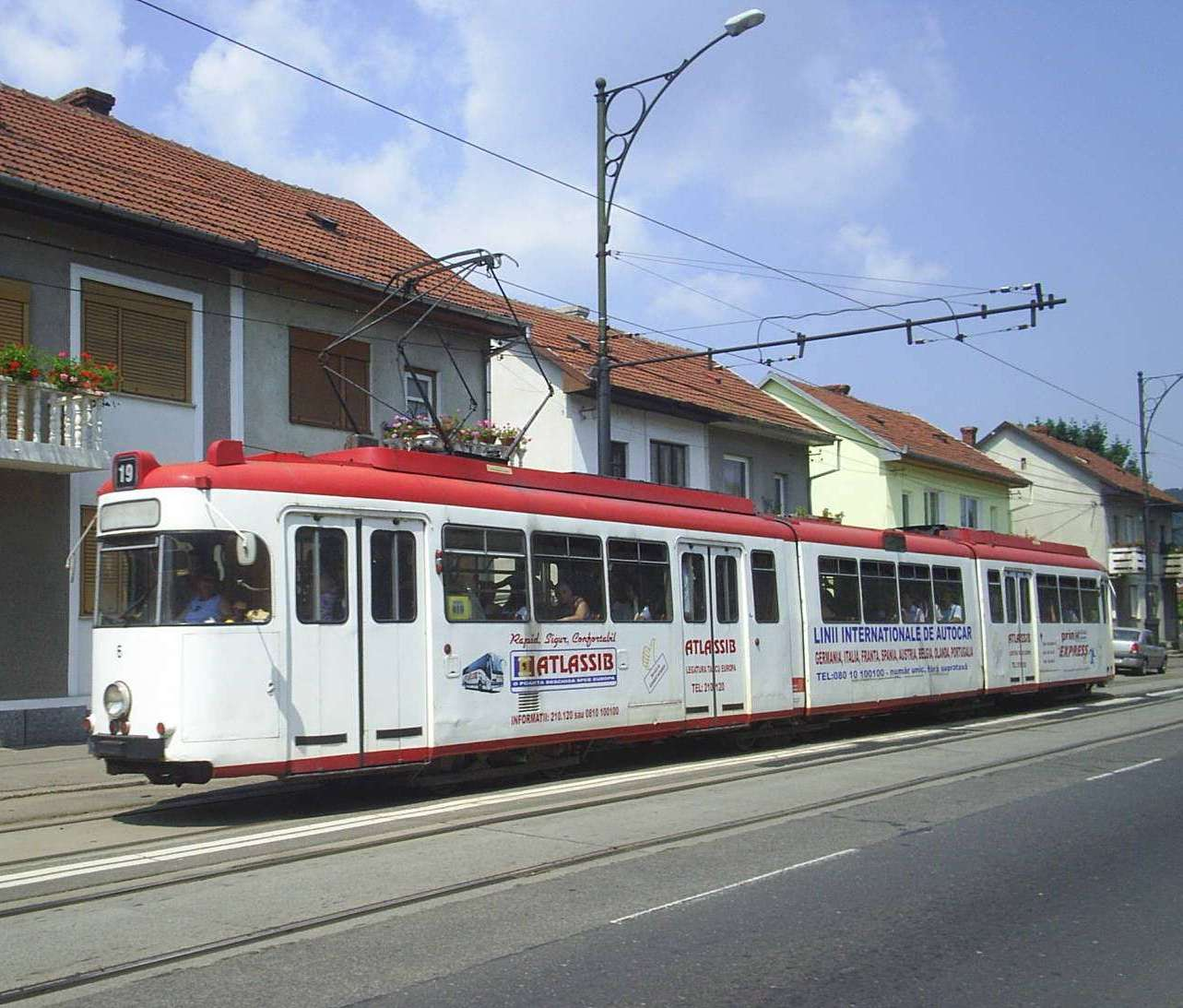
The GT8 Tram used in Reșița

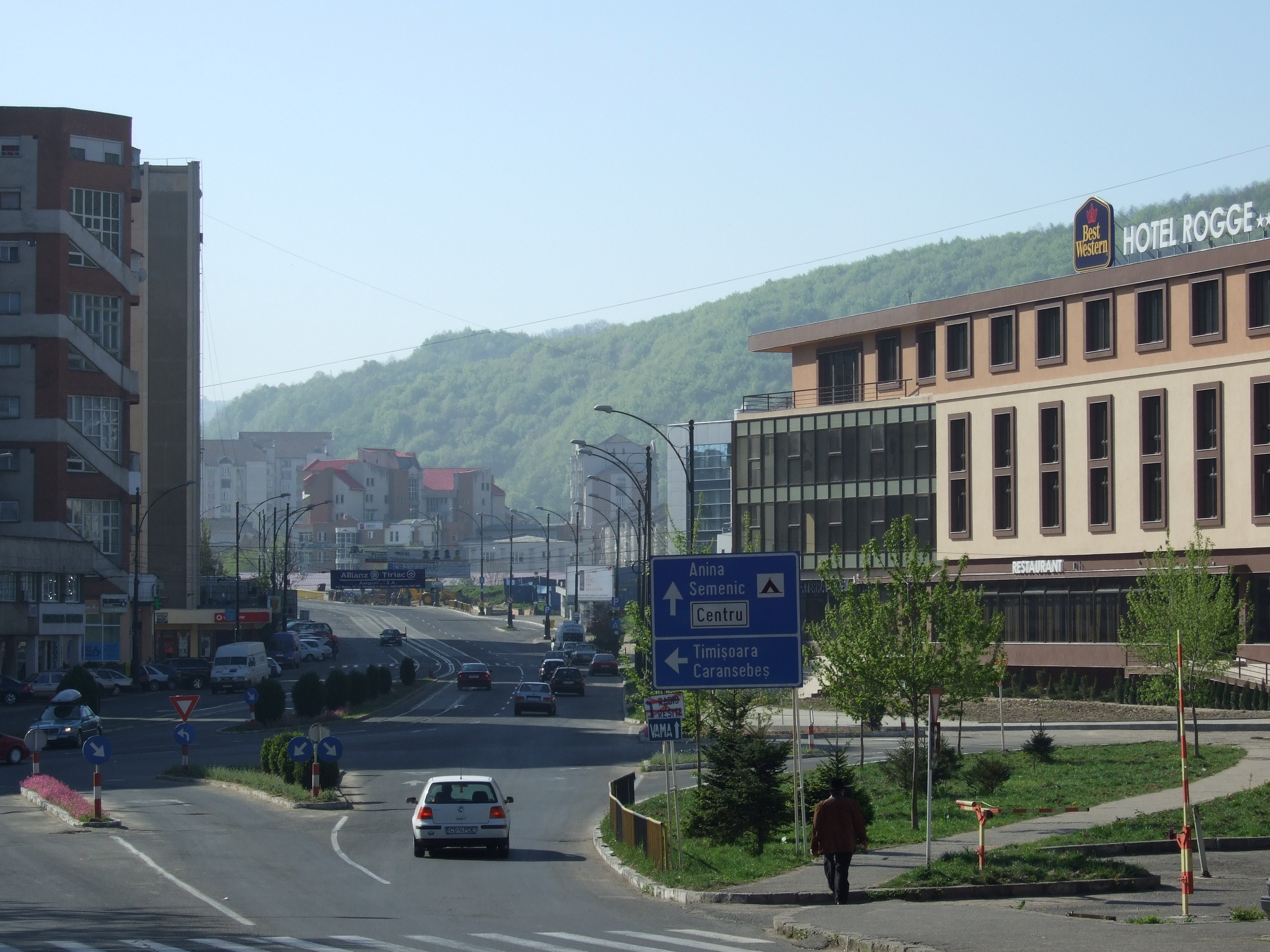
Boulevard crossing in downtown (2007).

Reșița's public transport relies on 6 bus lines and was operated by the now defunct Prescom company. It is now operated by Transport Urban Reșița (TUR).

==== Buses ====
Reșița's bus fleet consists of about 25 buses running on 6 lines:

- 1M/2: Marginea – Minda – Mol/Mopar/Molizilor
- 4: Moroasa II – Lend/Baraj (dam of Secu Lake) – CET – Molizilor – Moroasa II
- 8: Intim – Moniom – Intim
- 9: Intim – Țerova – Intim
- 10: Nera – Doman – Nera
- 11: Piața Republicii – Minda – Cuptoare – Piața Republicii

Reșița's bus fleet was to be upgraded sometime during 2009, and after in 2017 when the Resita municipality took over the management of public transport.

==== Trams ====
A tram system, consisting of two lines, operated between 1988 and 2011 and then needed to be restored. The 2 tram lines were the Renk–Muncitoresc line (0), and the Renk–Stavila line (DP) which was basically an expansion of the Renk-Muncitoresc line, but there were only 3 trams on this line. The tram fleet consisted of about 28 trams. The last trams were GT8 and N models imported from Germany (Dortmund and Frankfurt), and completely replaced the former pre-89 trams in 2002. In 2008, the new mayor announced his intention to decommission all trams and replace them with modern buses complying with EU standards.

Reintroduction of trams was announced in 2016 and the modernization and expansion of the tram system began in 2019. In 2017 it was announced that a new company, called Transport Urban Reșița (TUR), was created to manage the public transport in Reșița. In spring 2021, reopening was planned for December 2022, but was subsequently delayed. On December 20, 2024, tram services resumed in Reșița after a 13-year pause. The project, funded by the European Union, aimed to modernize public transport and improve urban mobility through a new tram line and updated infrastructure.

The revamped tram service operates along a 9 km route from Kaufland in the north to Reșița-Montana in the southeast. Although some sections of the original line remain closed, the new route offers a 30-minute end-to-end journey with trams running every 8 minutes during rush hours.

The infrastructure upgrade features modern tracks and energy-efficient power systems, improving the reliability of tram operations. Pedestrian and cycling paths built alongside the line support multimodal transport and reflect current urban mobility priorities.

=== Road transport ===
Reșița features a main 4 lane road that connects the neighbourhood Stavila to the neighbourhood of Câlnic. This main road passes through almost all important neighbourhoods in Reșița. The rest of the neighbourhoods in Reșița are accessible via 2 lane secondary roads or single-lane roads. Roads of Reșița are usually well maintained, especially the main road, but there are occasional pot-holes on secondary roads. The road signs are usually well placed and well maintained, and traffic is usually friendly and traffic jams are a myth. Accidents are very rare and almost never lethal. Externally Reșița is connected by national roads to Caransebeș (continued to Bucharest) and to Timișoara. There are also 3 county roads connecting Reșița to Oravița, Naidăș, and Anina.

== Notable people ==
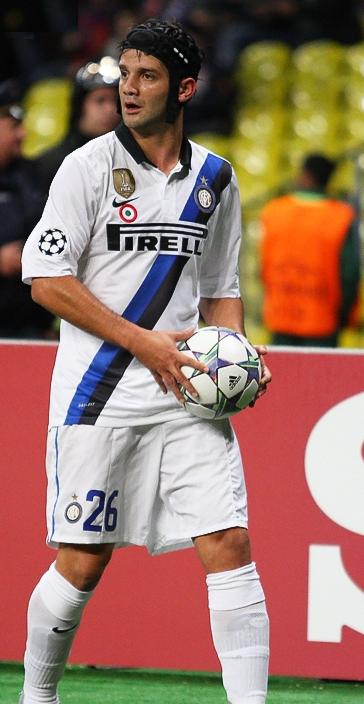
Cristian Chivu during a match in 2011

- Alexander Tietz (1896–1978), ethnographer
- Ciprian Foias (1933–2020), mathematician
- Rolf Bossert (1952–1986), poet
- Werner Stöckl (1952–), handballer
- Francisc Vaștag (1969–), boxer
- Christian Gabriel (1975–), chess grandmaster
- Cristian Chivu (1980–), football player and coach
- Flavius Koczi (1987–), artistic gymnast
- Andre Drago (born 1995), athlete, boxer and coach

== Sport ==
Association football

- CSM Reșița

Handball

- HC Adrian Petrea
- CSM Reșița

== Twin towns – sister cities ==
Reșița is twinned with:

- Baskil, Turkey
- Bihać, Bosnia and Herzegovina
- Caen, France
- Kikinda, Serbia
- Loreto, Italy
- Marijampolė, Lithuania
- Pančevo, Serbia
- Pesaro, Italy
- Požarevac, Serbia
- Veliko Gradište, Serbia
- Vrgorac, Croatia
- Vršac, Serbia
