= Reșița Steam Locomotive Museum =

- Muzeul Locomotivelor cu Abur din Reșița
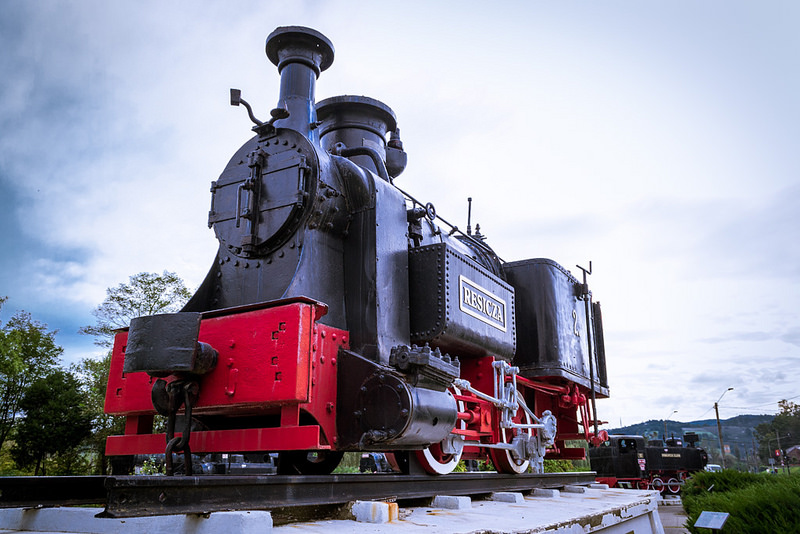
- The Resicza locomotive on display
- Location: Reșița, Romania
- Coordinates: 45.3120°N 21.8777°E
- Type: Open Air Railway Museum
- Accreditation: CFR
- Key holdings: Locomotive "RESICZA"
- Collections: Steam locomotive
- Collection size: 16 locomotives
- Founder: Engineer Mircea Popa
- Curator: Walter Fleck
- Owner: Fundația Uzinele de Fier și Domenile Reșița(UDR)
- Public transit access: Train: R-16105 and Bus: 1A & 2 at Triaj and Mociur stations
- Website: www.mlaresita.org

The Reșița Steam Locomotive Museum is an open-air railway museum located in the Triaj Park district of Reșița, Caraș-Severin County, Romania. Entry is free and there is no restriction on examining the exhibits. It claims it is the largest open-air railway museum in Europe.

The museum was founded by Engineer Mircea Popa, then director of the locomotive manufacturing plant located in Reșița. Its inauguration was meant to coincide with the centennial anniversary of locomotive manufacturing history in the city. The locomotive factory produced 1,491 steam locomotives with the last one being produced in 1964, after which production shifted to diesel and electric locomotives.

Reșița became an extremely important pillar of the railway industry in Hungary and Romania around 1867 after private companies, like the iron factories and steel works of Rimamurány-Salgótarjáni Vasmű Rt. (Rimamurány-Salgótarján Ironwork Co. - RMST), and Állami Vaspályatársaság (State Railway Company - ÁVT - Staats Eisenbahngesellschaft – StEg in German) started production in Reșița.

There are a total of 16 locomotives on display, 14 of which were produced by local factory and span over 100 years in steam locomotive history. The other two locomotives, the Bogsan and Hungaria, were acquired in 1937.

The museum and its collection was added to as a National Monument (Monument Istoric) in 2004 with an LMI code of CS-II-a-A-10905.

In 2013, the Resicza lost out to the Danube Gorge to become the regional symbol of the Romanian Banat for European Cooperation Day, which is yearly on September 21.

== Collection ==
The open-air museum hosts 16 locomotives, with 14 constructed locally:

1. "RESICZA" – First locomotive produced in Romania
2. "PRINCIPESA ELENA" – First locomotive designed in Romania
3. CFF 704.209 – Sister model of the "PRINCIPESA ELENA"
4. CFF 764.001 – Forest steam locomotive, model 764–REȘIȚA
5. CFF 764.103 – Forest steam locomotive, model 764–REȘIȚA
6. CFF 704.493 – Factory steam locomotive, model 764.4–REȘIȚA
7. CFF 704.404 – Forest steam locomotive, model "Anina II"
8. CFU 14 – Industrial steam locomotive, model "Siderurgică"
9. CFU 28 – Industrial steam locomotive, model "MÁV XIVa", later "MÁV 475"
10. CFU 29 – Industrial steam locomotive, Modell "Siderurgică"
11. CFR 50.025 – Replica of the Austrian type "KkStB 80"
12. CFR 230.128 – Replica of the "Preußischen P8"
13. CFR 142.072 – Replica of the Austrian "BBÖ 214"
14. CFR 50.378/50.115 – Replica of der German "G 10"
15. CFR 131.003 – Last Romanian self constructed steam locomotive ng
16. CFR 150.038 – Replica of the German "DRB Class 50"

=== "RESICZA" – Romania's first locomotive ===
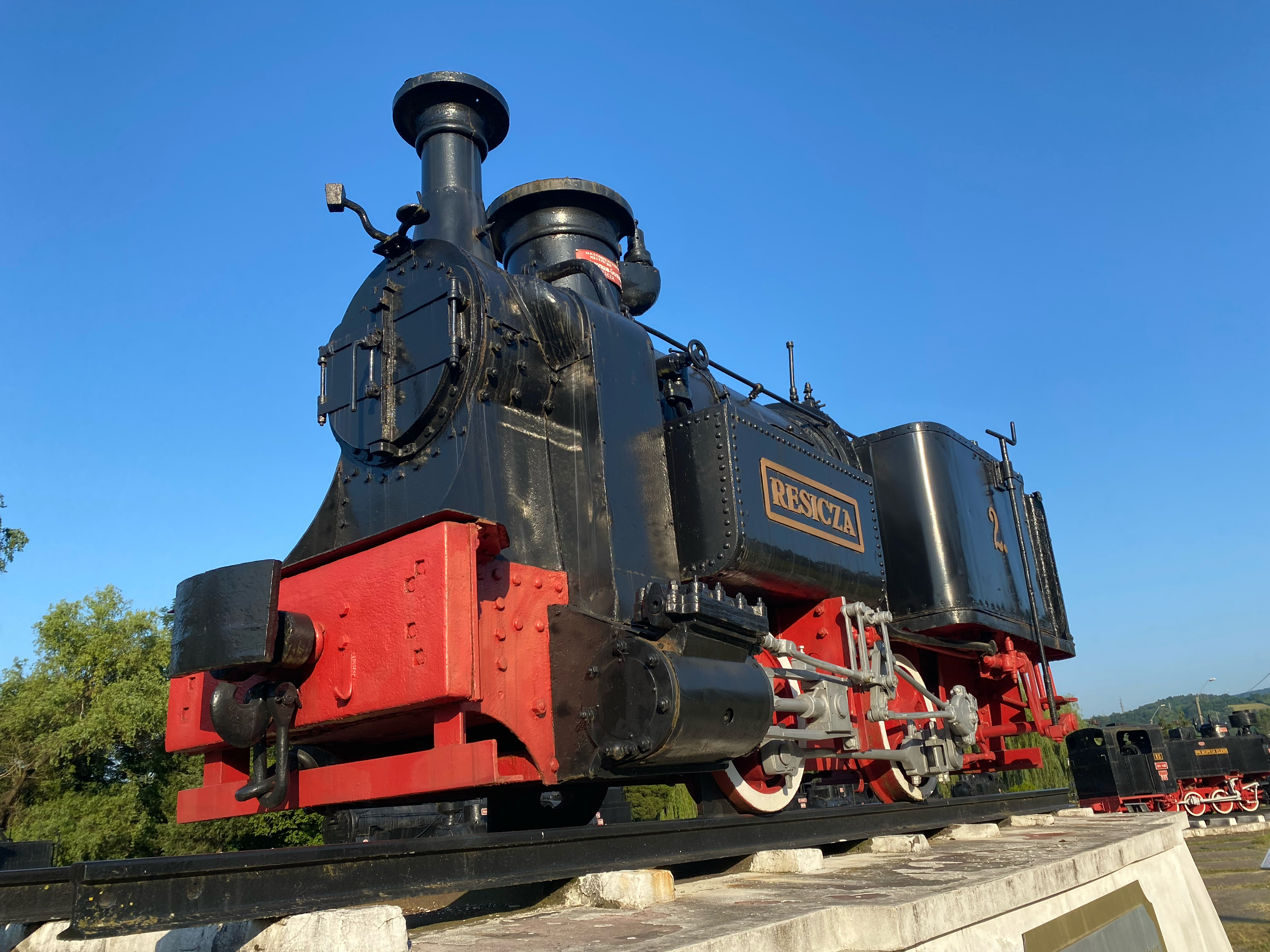
Romania's first locomotive

The main attraction is the steam locomotive "RESICZA". It was produced in Reșița in 1872 as the first Southeast European locomotive. The inscription in the museum identifies it as the first steam locomotive built in Romania. (Note: The embossed plate on the stone base in the museum reads: "Prima locomotivă cu abur fabricată în România, la Reșița, în anul 1872" (English: "The first steam locomotive manufactured in Romania, in Reșița, in 1972")) However, Reșița and the Banat region did not yet belong to Romania in 1872, but only from 1920. In this respect the "RESICZA" is strictly speacing the first "built in the territory of today's Romania" locomotive, which, however, clearly marks the beginning of Reșița's and thus of later Romania's tradition in locomotive's construction.

==== Viennese Haswell locomotive "SZEKUL" as the template ====
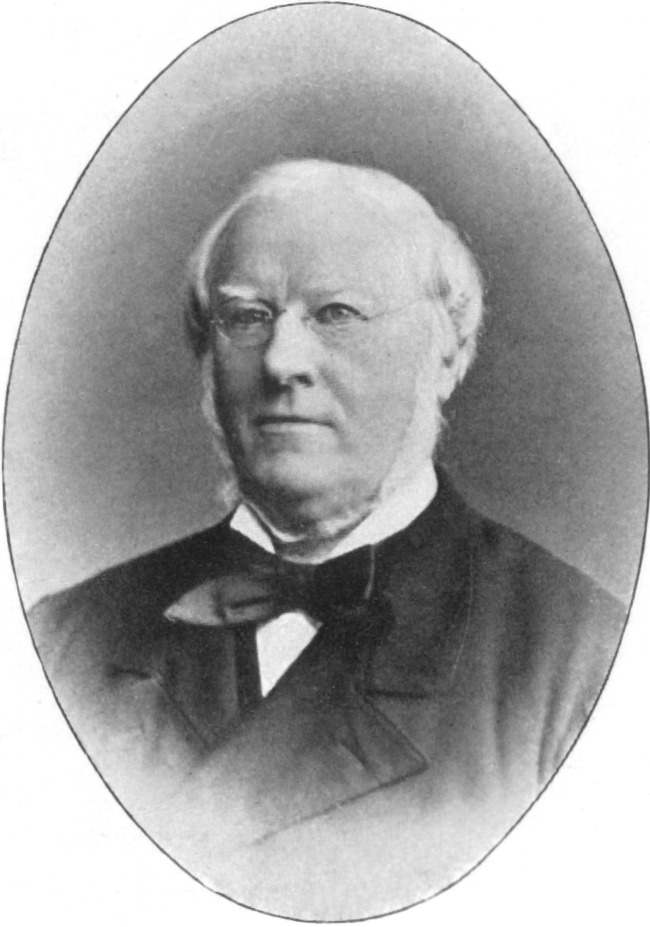
John Haswell, head of Vienna locomotive factory

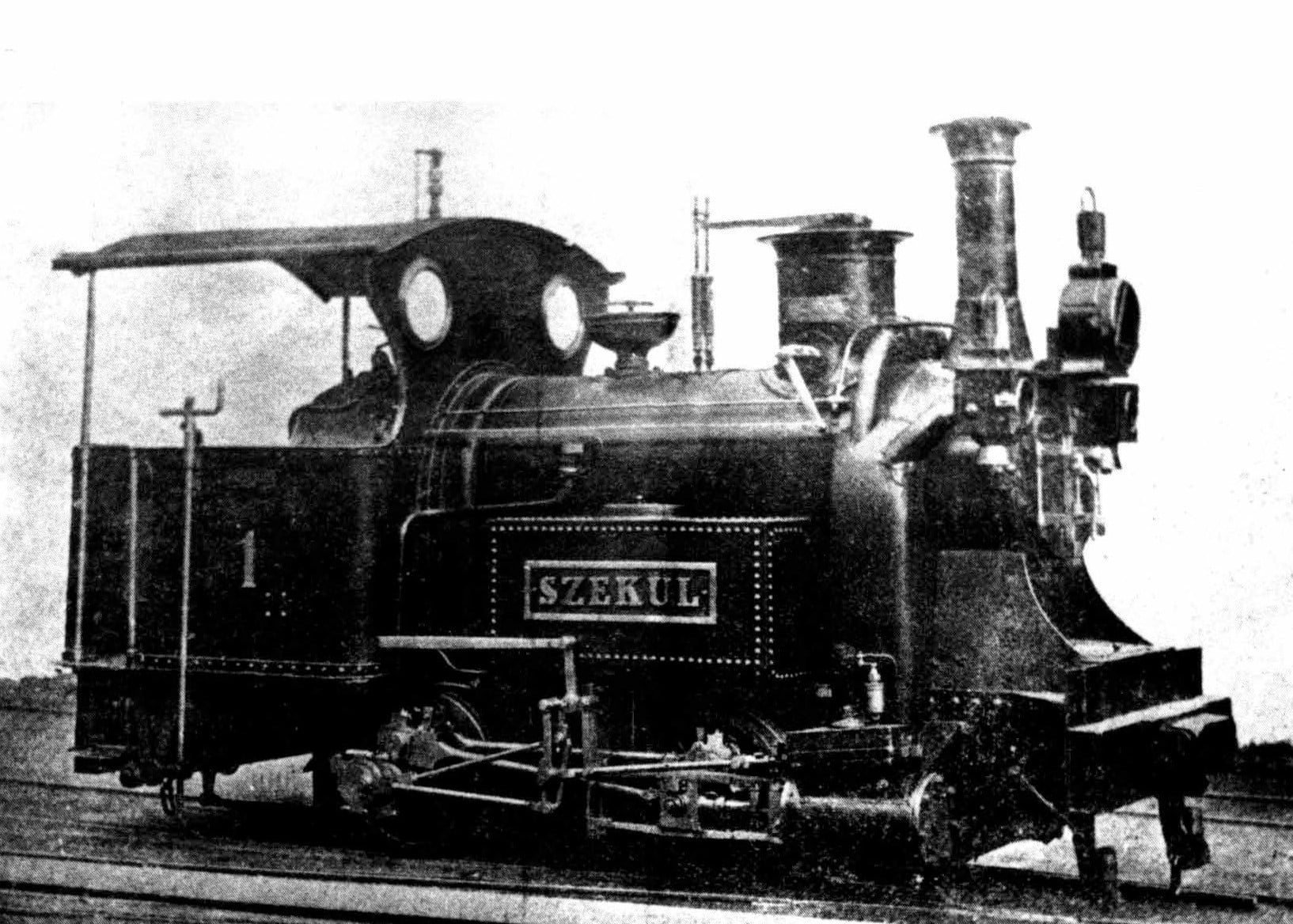
The SZEKUL – first running locomotive in Banat and template for the RESICZA

In 1871 the manager of the Vienna StEG locomotive factory, John Haswell, had designed a special locomotive for operation in valleys with narrow curve radii. This locomotive with the name "SZEKUL" was transported from Vienna to Reșița in an elaborate operation: first by ship across the Danube from Vienna to the Danube port Baziaș, then via the railway line from Baziaș to Oravița, which was completed in 1854, and finally on a pallet drawn by 36 oxen from Oravița to Reșița.

Steam locomotive operations began in Banat for the first time in 1871 with the SZEKUL. The SZEKUL also served as a model for the Bt-n2 type production in locally in Reșița. The first locomotive build was the "RESICZA" in 1872 followed by the sister models "BOCSAN" and "HUNGARIA" in 1873. The HUNGARIA was brought to Vienna in 1873 and presented at the 1873 World Exhibition there. It was later presented at the Budapest Millennium Exhibition 1896 as the first "steam locomotive ever built in Hungary with Hungarian raw materials".

The other six locomotives manufactured in Reșița until 1918 were not given names and were of different types: four of the type D-n2 (model StEG 54 Orient) in 1884, 1894 and 1898 and two of the type Ct-n2 (model StEG 123) in 1894 and 1898.

==== Operation of the "RESICZA" ====
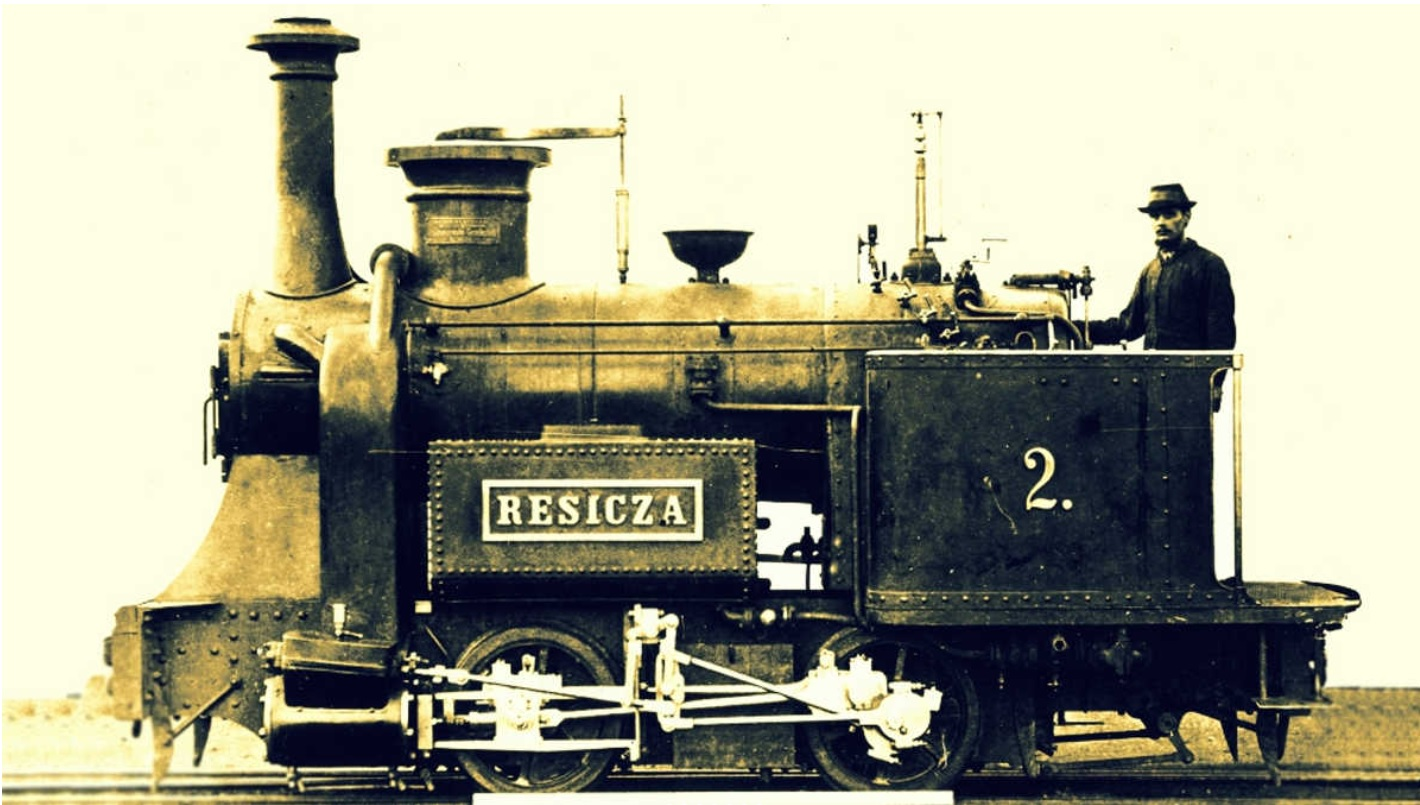
RESICZA in operation

The "RESICZA" is the second of a total of four steam locomotives of the StEG 52 series with the Bt-n2 wheel arrangement. It has a 948 mm gauge, two axles and four driven wheels with a wheel diameter of 711 mm. It is 4470 mm long. The water tank has a volume of approximately 2 m^{3} (71 cu ft). It has an empty weight of 9.5 tons and weighs 11.5 tons when ready for operation. Two cylinders with a diameter of 237 mm give it a tracting effort of 1125 kgf (historical reference "kilogram of force" for kilopond, equivalent to 11,032 Newtons). Their maximum permitted speed was 11 km/h.

After the "SZEKUL", which was imported from Vienna in 1871, the "RESICZA" became the second running locomotive from 1872 on the Reșița–Secu narrow-gauge railway and, from September 3, 1873, on the newly completed Reșița-Bocsa. It therefore bore a sign with the inscription "2", which can be seen in old photos and was lost in 1948.

As the first steam locomotive to be produced in Reșița itself, it marks the beginning of Romanian steam locomotive production, during which a total of 1,461 machines were manufactured in Reșița until 1964.

The "RESICZA" was in operation from 1872 to 1937. After decommissioning, she was used as a steam generator in Câmpia Turzii for an unknown period.

==== The "RESICZA" in the museum ====
After its use in Câmpia Turzii, the "RESICZA" was considered as lost until it was accidentally rediscovered by pupils on a disused track near the city in 1957. It was brought back to Reșița in 1961 and initially presented there on a side track next to the locomotive factory, which was still in operation. Finally, in 1972, it was brought to the Triaj district to serve as the main attraction of the open-air museum that opened in the same year.

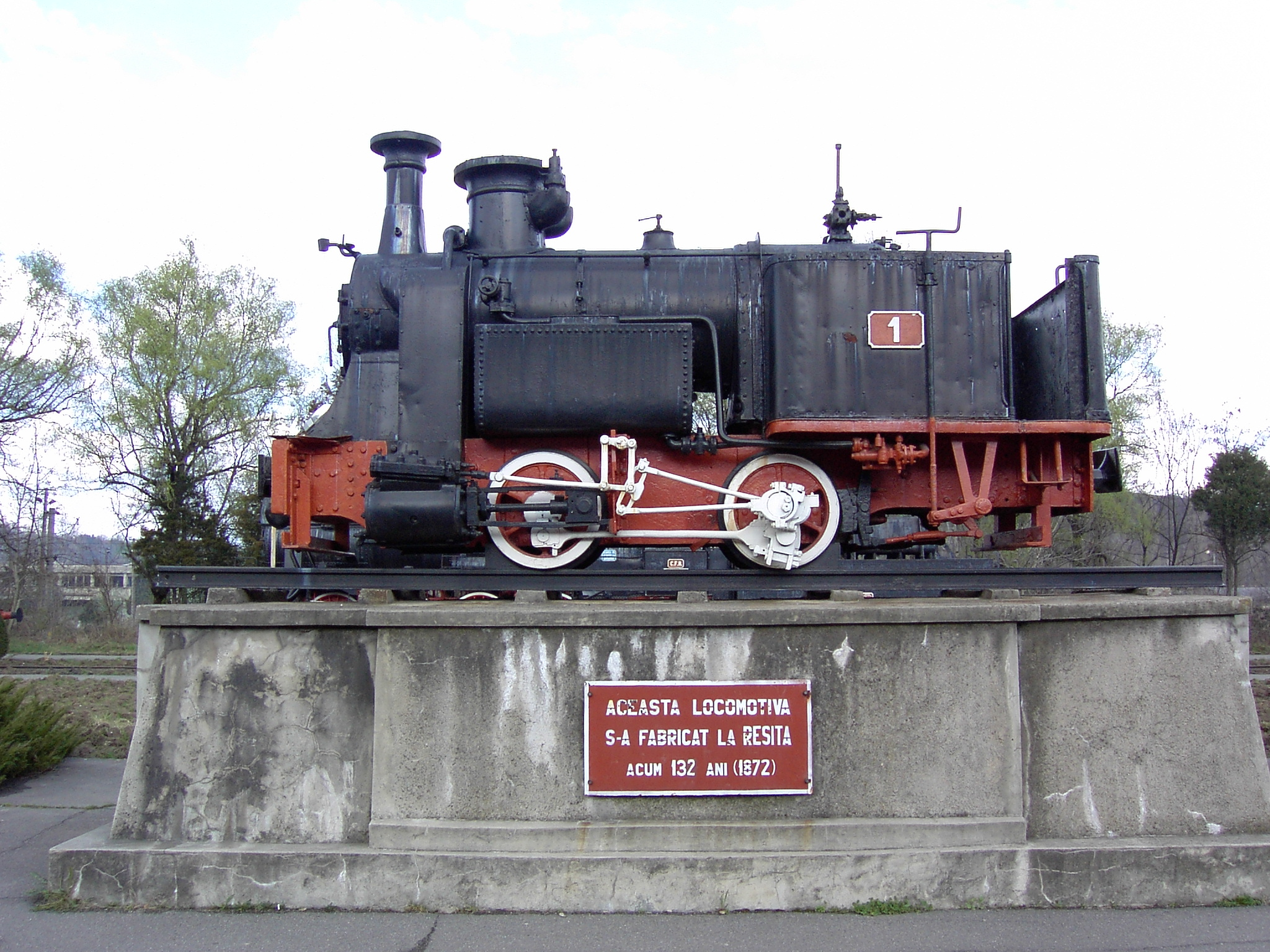
RESICZA with the wrong number "1"

Meanwhilelingly, the lost original plate with the number "2" was due to a misunderstanding incorrectly replaced by a plate with the number "1", as was worn by the "SZEKUL" as the first locomotive used in Romania. Therefore, there are early photos of the "RESICZA" exhibited in the museum with the historically incorrect sign "1". This false plate was removed and replaced in 2012 with a historically correct replica of the original with the number "2", so that the locomotive now corresponds to its original appearance.

Since the museum opened in 1972, the "RESICZA" ist presented on a stone base in the center. This originally bore a plate with the inscription "ACESTA LOCOMOTIVA S-A FABRIVAT LA RESITA IN ANUAL 1872" (English: "This locomotive here was manufactured in Resita in 1872") and supplemented the plate with the incorrect number "1" on the locomotive). The plate on the base was replaced. Now the inscription is: "Prima locomotivă cu abur fabricată in România, la Reșița, in anul 1872" (English: "The first steam locomotive manufactured in Romania, Reșița, in 1872").

== Gallery ==
Locomotive Displays

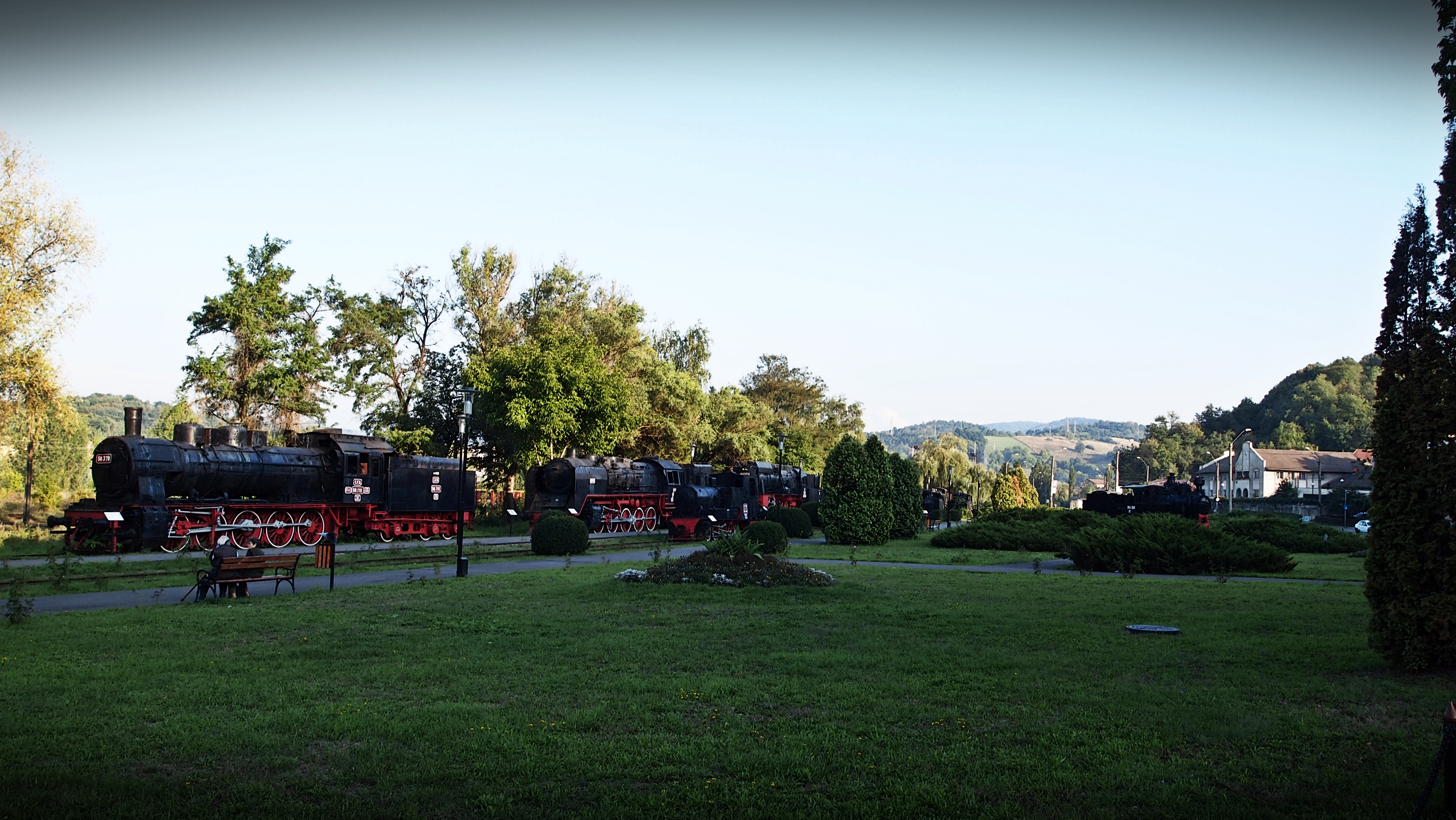
Triaj Park Museum view

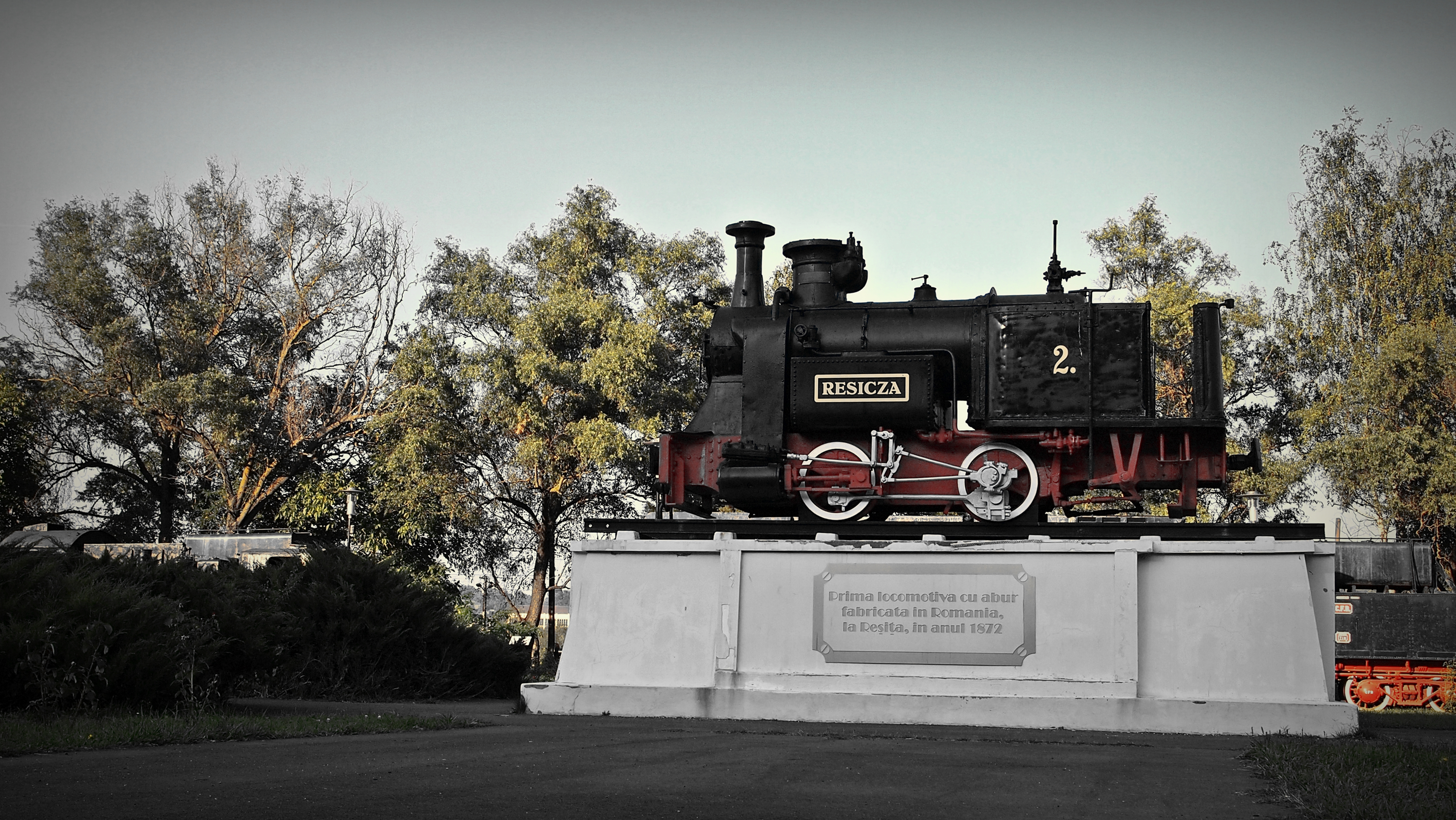
Resicza

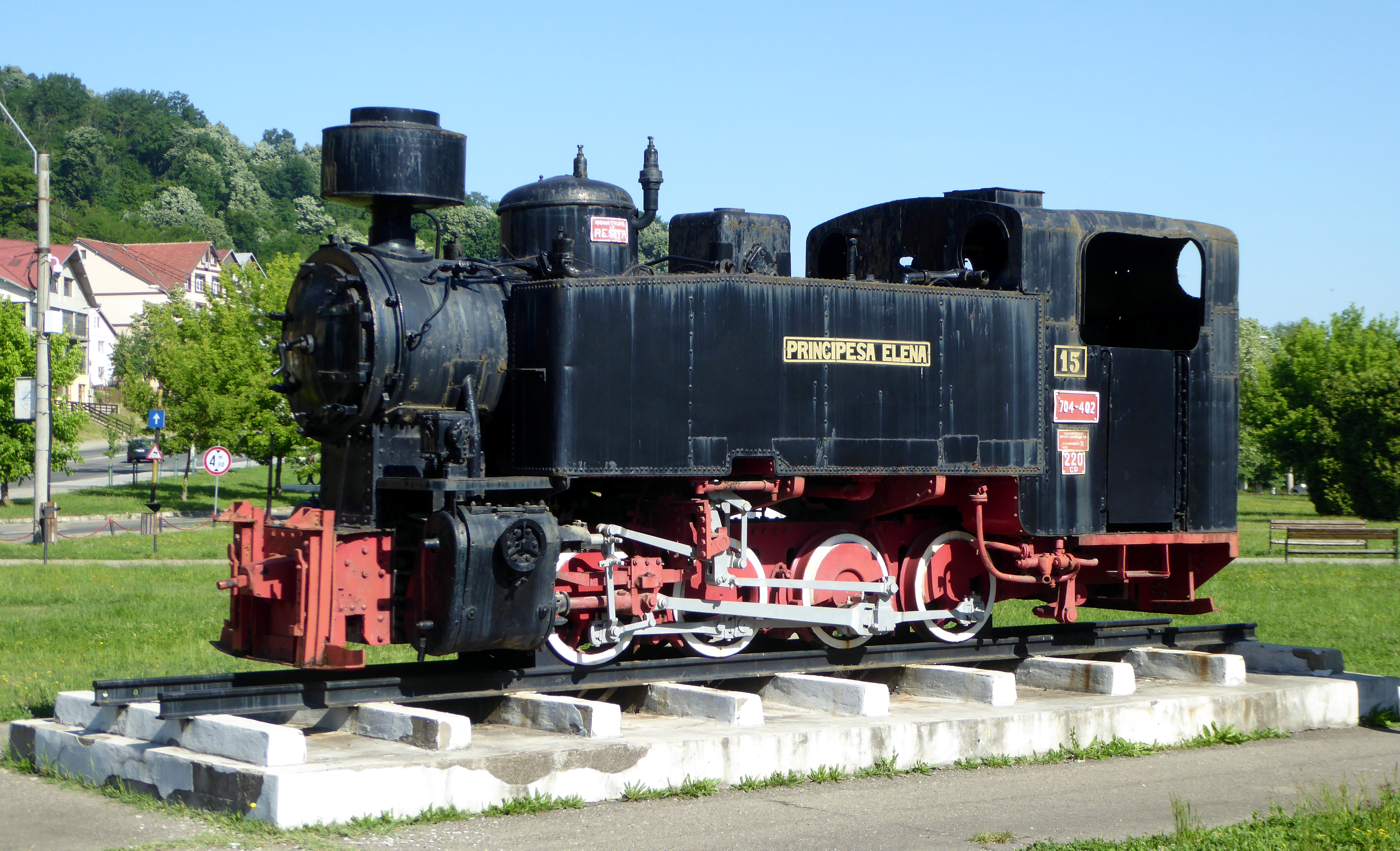
Princess Elena locomotive

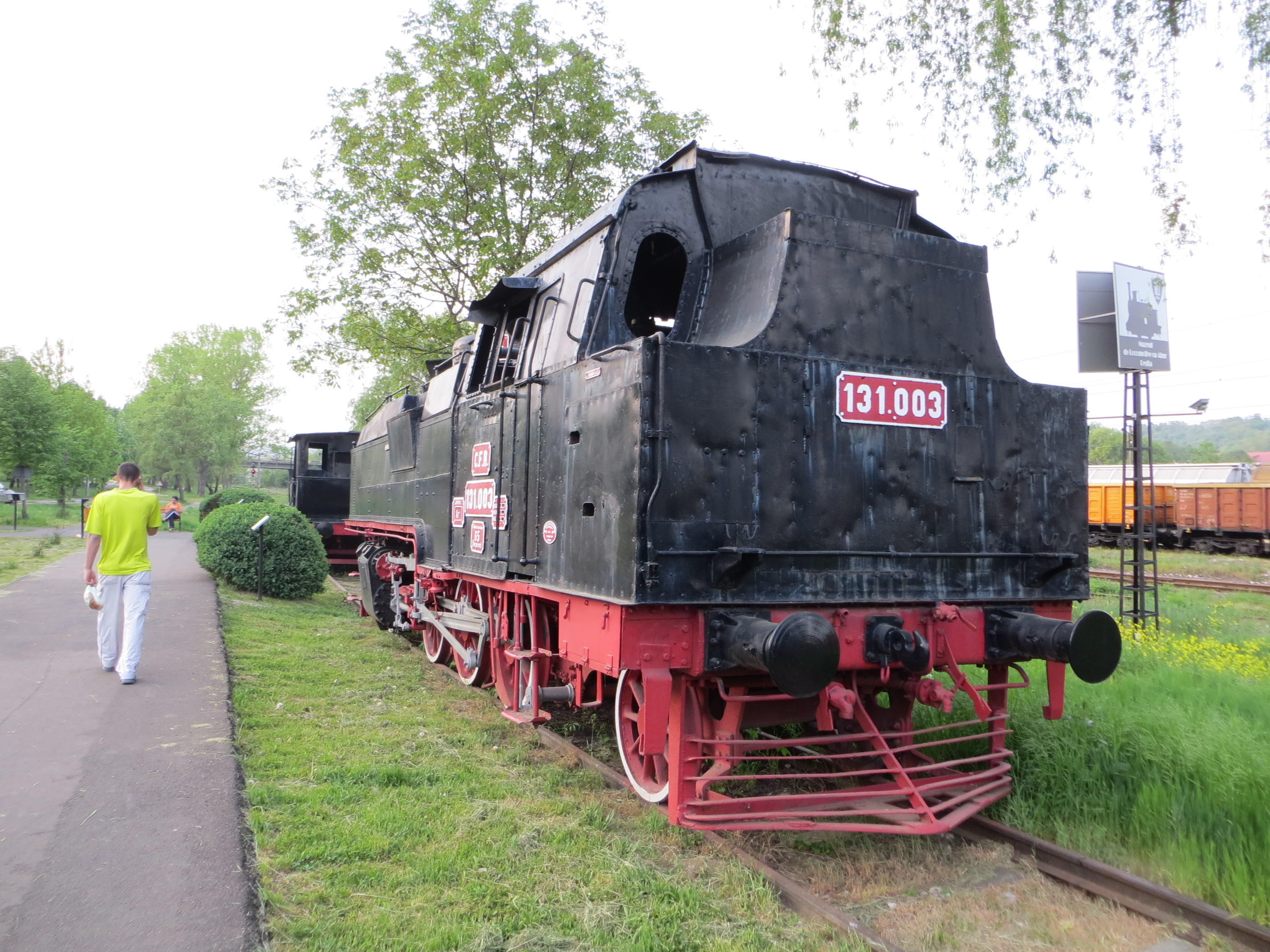
CFR 131.003 locomotive

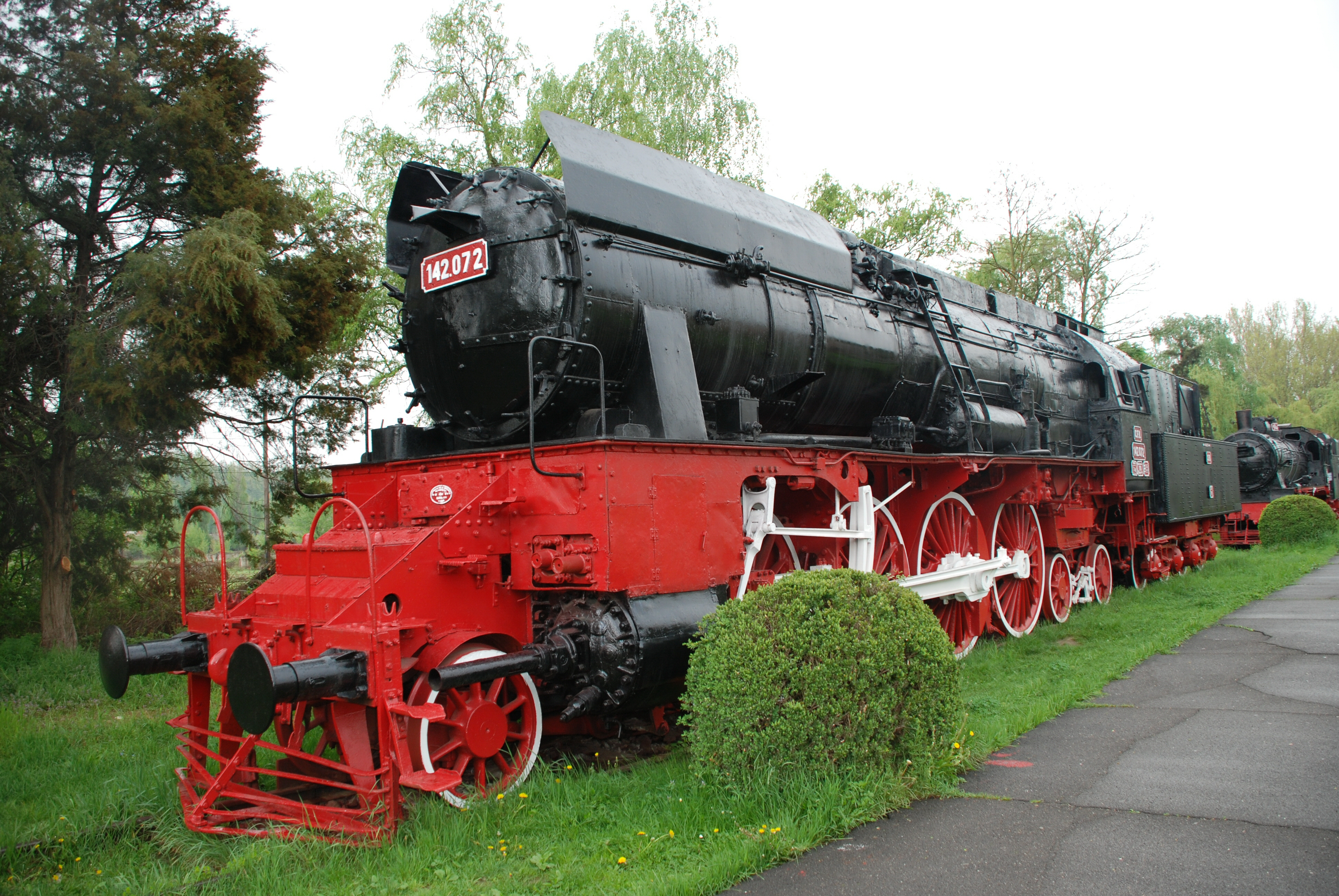
CFR 142.072 locomotive

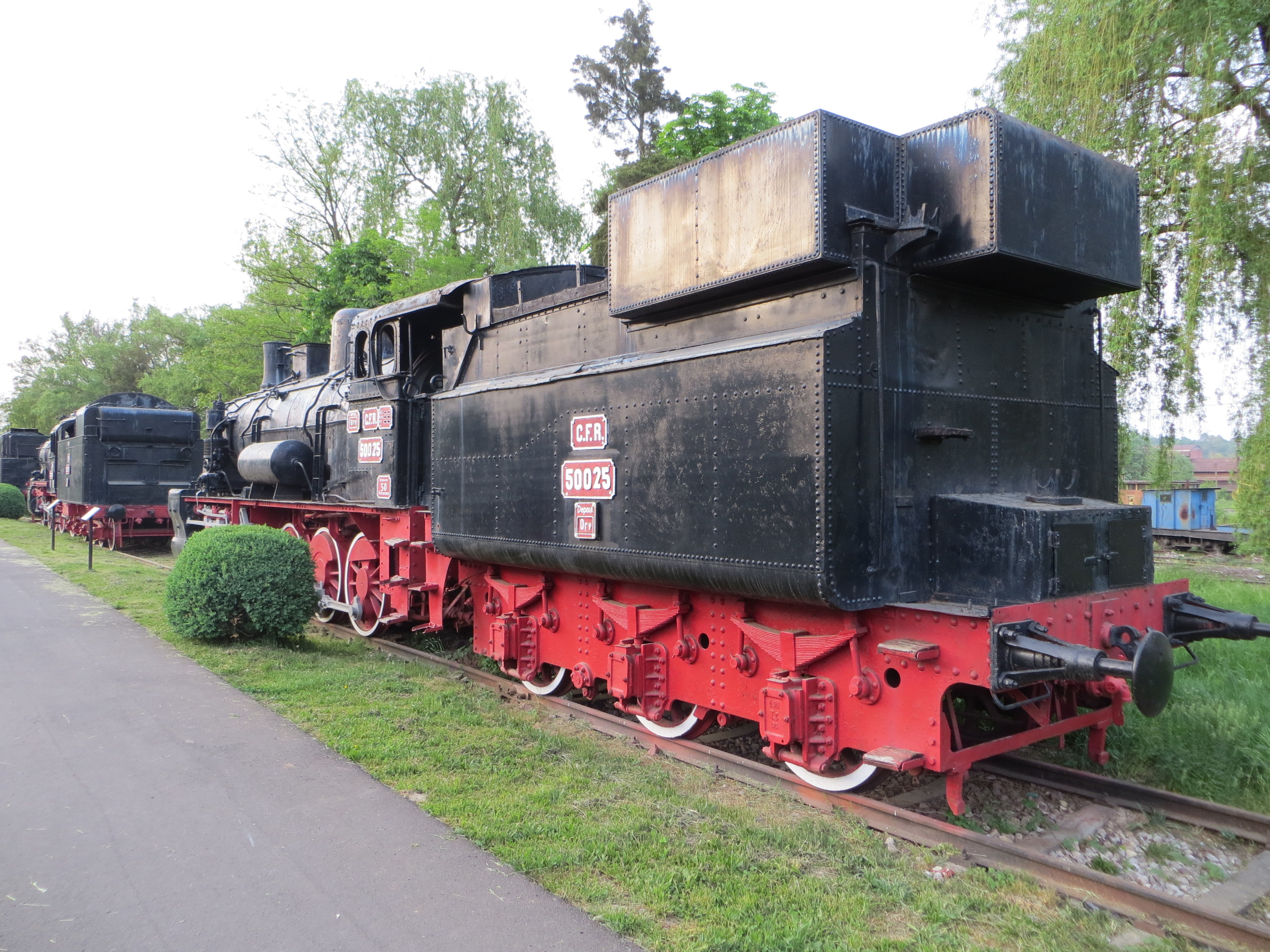
CFR 50.025 locomotive

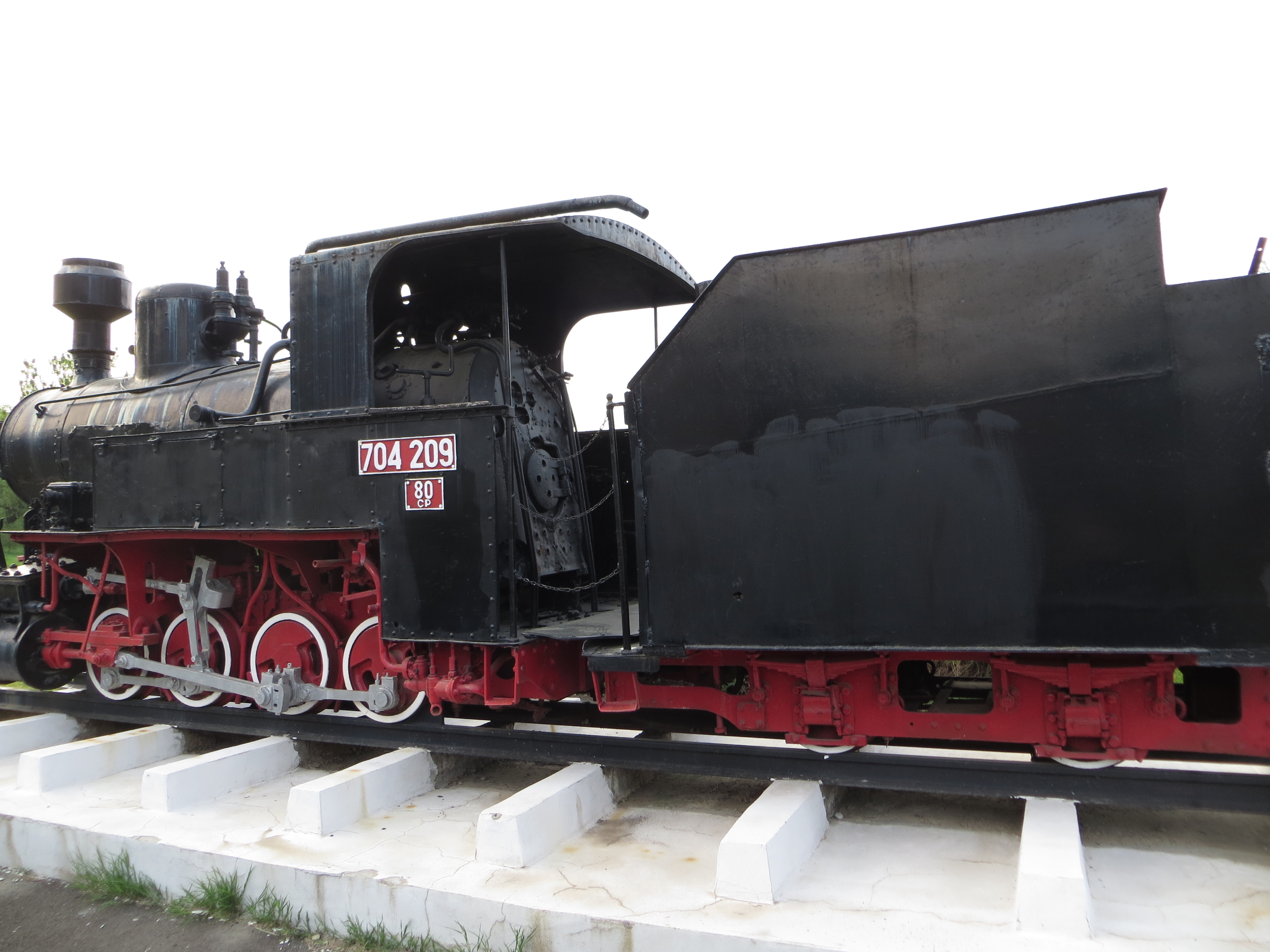
CFR 704.209 locomotive

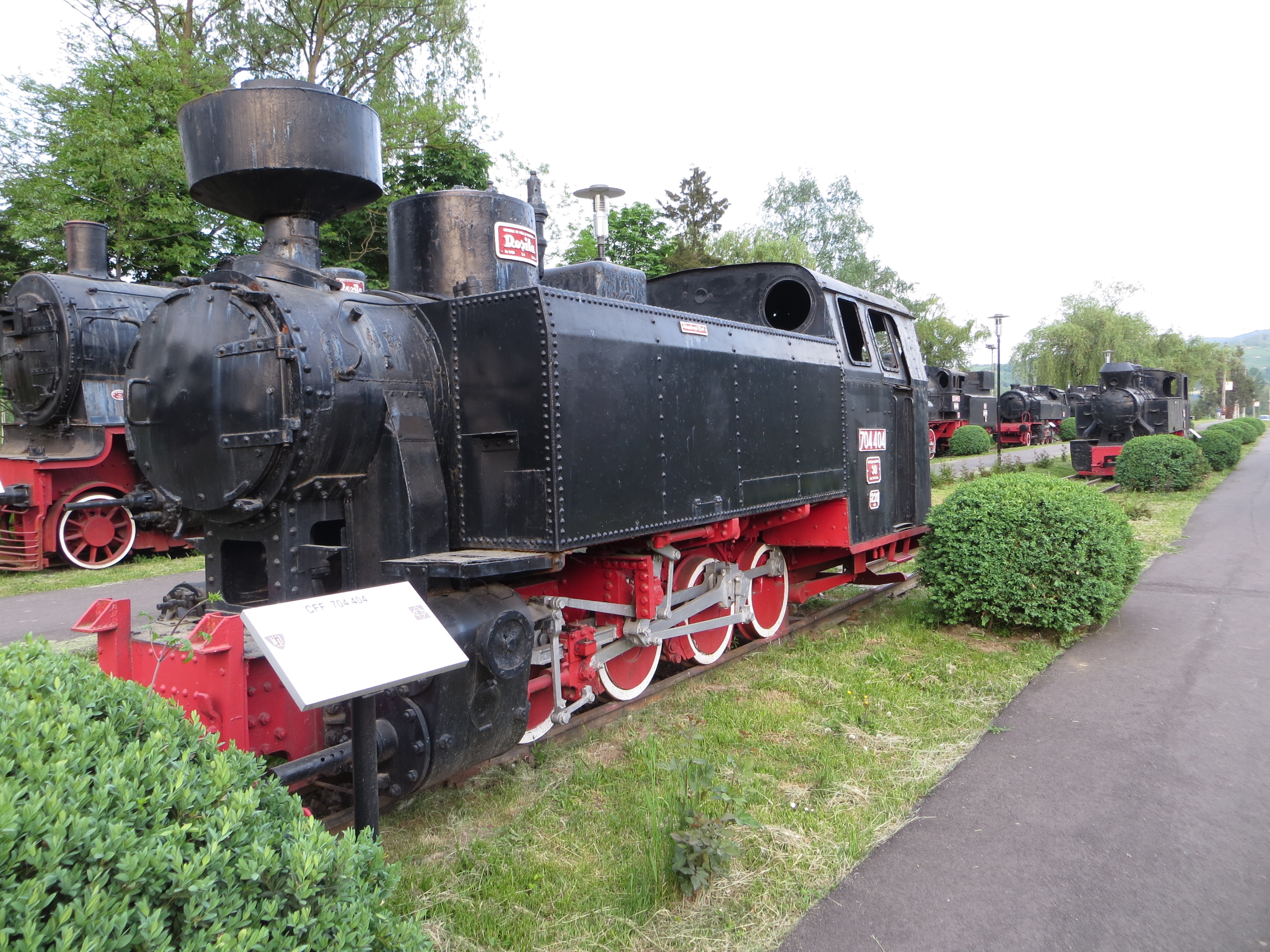
CFR 704.404 locomotive

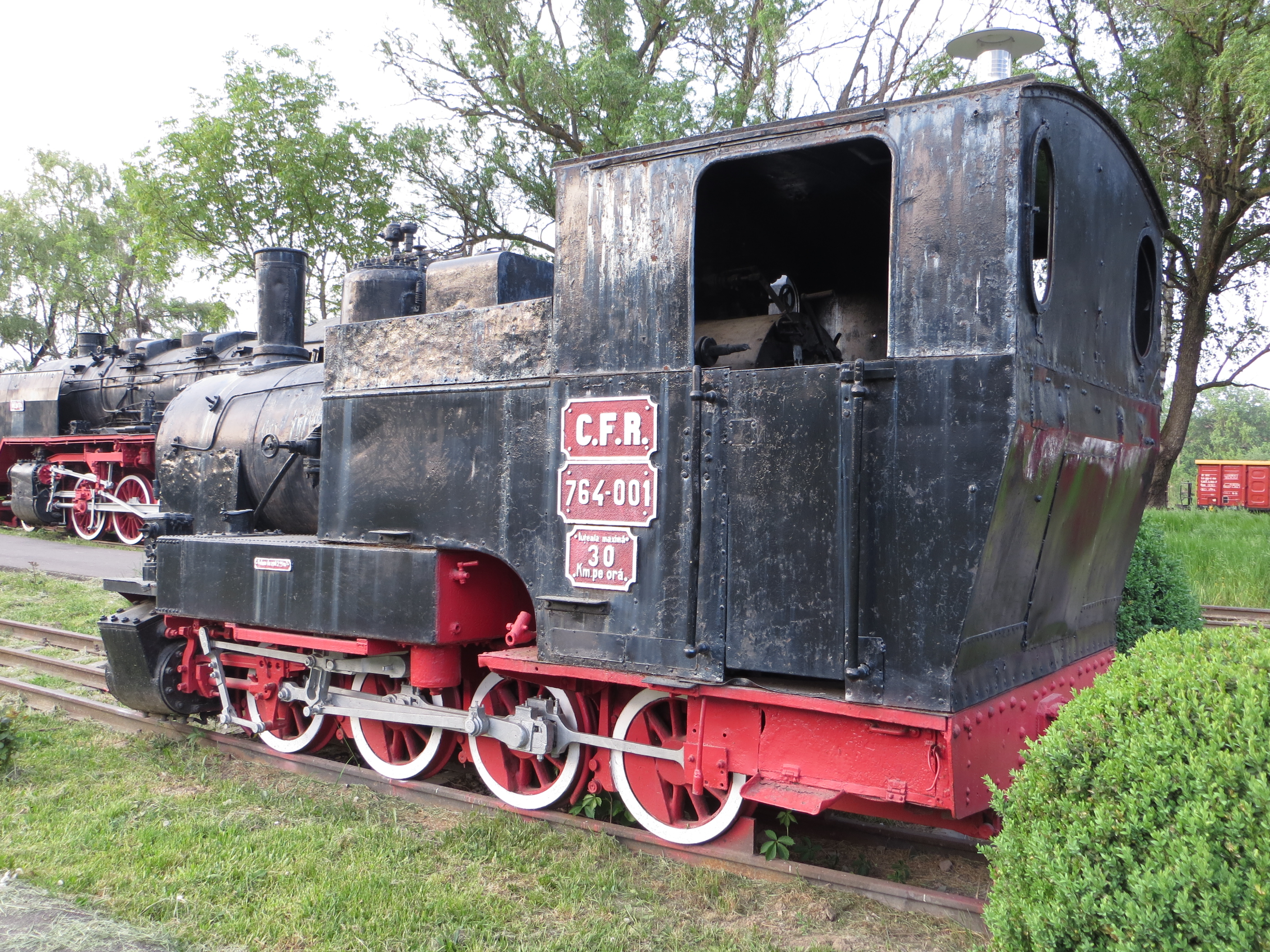
CFR 764.001 locomotive

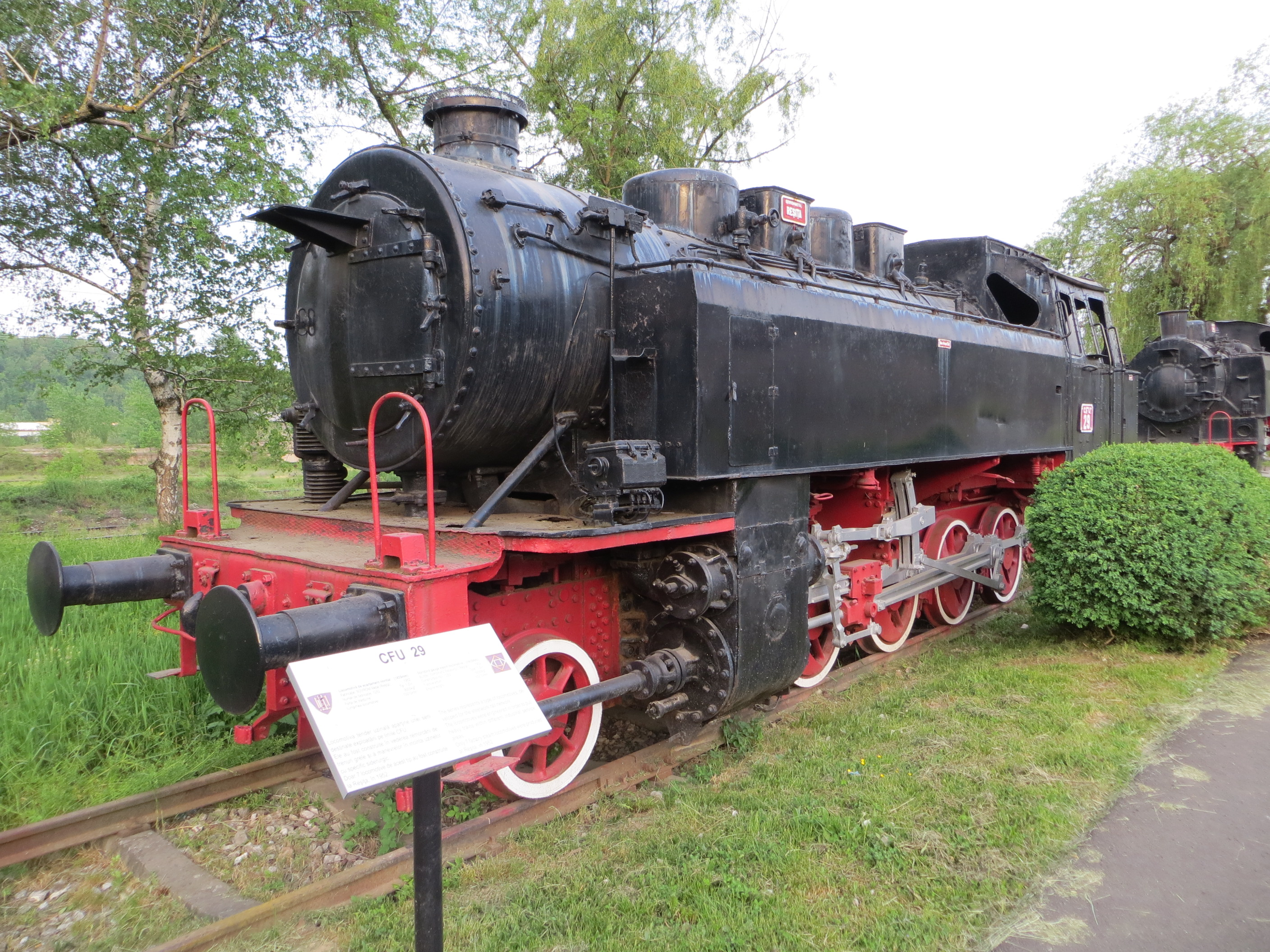
CFU 29 locomotive
