= Andre Drago =

Romanian Athlete, Boxer, Coach (born 1995)

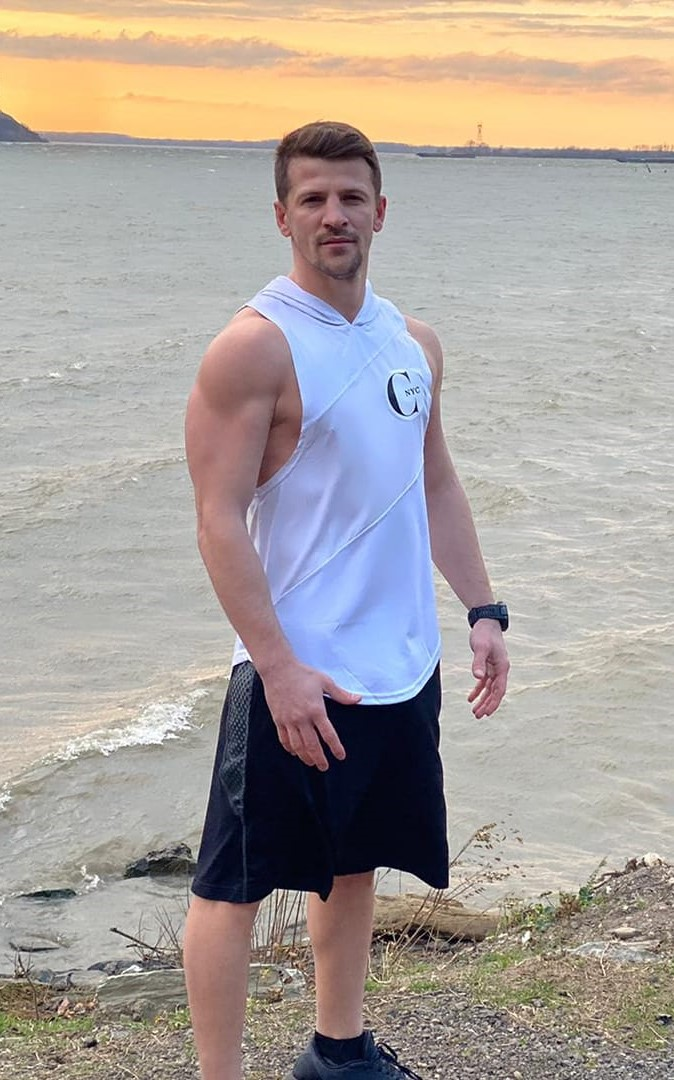
- Drago in 2020

Personal information
- Full name: Andrei Dragomir
- Nickname: Drago
- National team: Romania
- Born: 30 July 1990 (age 35)
- Occupation: Boxer
- Height: 175 cm (5 ft 9 in)

Sport
- Sport: Boxing

Andre Drago (actually Andrei Dragomir, born on 30 July 1990 in Romania), is a Romanian professional athlete, boxer living currently in Frankfurt, Germany. He is a former International and National Champion, was a part of the national and olympic team of Romania. One of is most remarkable wins, was by winning the Men's National Championship Tournament in 2013: Winning all of his 4 fights in the tournament before the 3 round by TKO. He is from Reșița.

== Biography ==
By roots, he's half Serbian and half Romanian, his mother is from Serbia and his father is from Romania. Starting his boxing career at a young age in Resita,Romania. Was trained by the remarkable former World Champion and European Champion Francisc Vastag. In the present he was also trained by a remarkable former olympian medalist and World Champion Zoltan Lunka.
