= Doman (river) =

Doman Budinic
- Location within Romania

Location
- Country: Romania
- Counties: Caraș-Severin County
- Villages: Doman

Physical characteristics
- Mouth: Bârzava
  - location: Reșița
  - coordinates: 45.2899°N 21.8882°E
- Length: 5 km (3.1 mi)
- Basin size: 16 km^{2} (6.2 sq mi)

Basin features
- Progression: Bârzava→ Timiș→ Danube→ Black Sea
- Tributaries
  - left: Stârnic

The Doman (also: Budinic) is a left tributary of the river Bârzava in Romania. It flows into the Bârzava in the city Reșița. Its length is 5 km (3.1 mi) and its basin size is 16 km^{2} (6.2 sq mi).
