= Romanian district =

A Romanian district (Latin: districtus Valachorum) was an autonomous administrative unit of the Vlachs (or Romanians) in the medieval Kingdom of Hungary.

== Origins ==
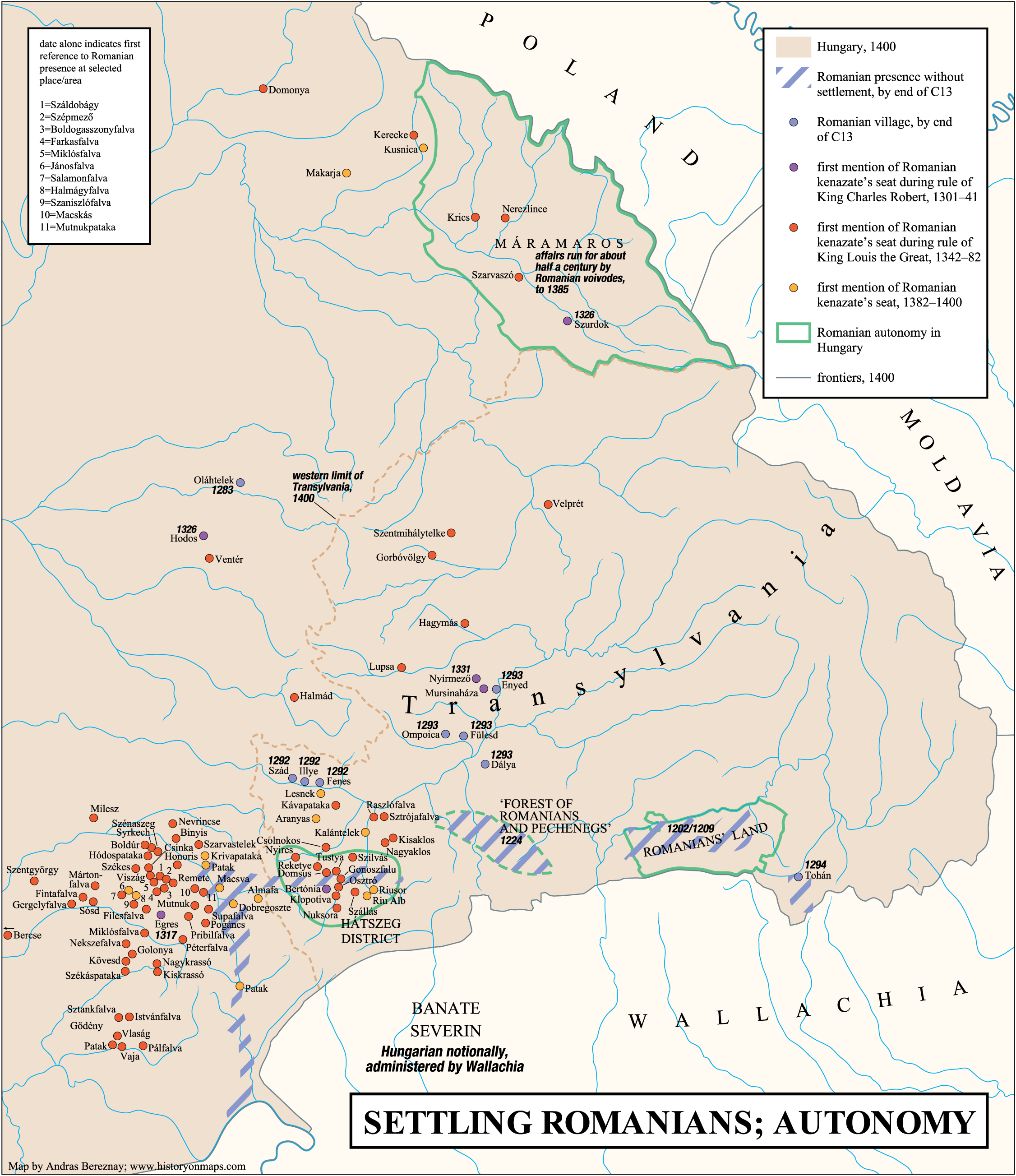
Earliest mentions of Romanian settlements in official documents in the Kingdom of Hungary (between 1200 and 1400).

According to scholars who say that the Romanians (or Vlachs) descended from the inhabitants of the Roman province of "Dacia Traiana", the Romanians' territorial organization can be traced back to Roman patterns. Their cohabitation with the Slavs, who settled in the region during the Early Middle Ages, also influenced the Romanians' local administration, as it is demonstrated by the title knez of the Romanians' leaders. However, no firm territorial structures developed before the Kingdom of Hungary incorporated Crișana, Banat, Transylvania and other regions inhabited by the Romanians. The territorial units of the Romanians were mentioned as terrae ("lands"), kneziatus ("a territory under a knez's rule"), provinciae, sedes ("seats") in medieval royal charters, but most commonly as districtus Valachorum ("district of the Romanians").

According to a concurring scholarly theory, the Romanians' districts came into existence through organized migration in the 13th-15th centuries. The knezes who organized the settlement of the pastoralist Vlachs in the mountainous regions became the hereditary leaders of the newly established villages. The knezes were responsible for the collection of the "fiftieth", which was an in kind tax (two ewes for every hundred sheep), specific to the Vlach communities. In exchange, they had a share in the tax income and they were entitled to own mills in their districts.

== Administration ==
The local administration of the districts is known from documents issued in the second half of the 14th century. The districts, with their own assemblies and officials, had a strong corporate character. For instance, in 1360, the property rights of local knezes to two villages was confirmed at the assembly of "all the knezes and men of other status" in the Hațeg district. The assembly was presided by the castellan of the royal castle of Hațeg, and the ruling was made by a jury, made up of twelve knezes, six priests and six communers.

== List of Romanian districts ==
=== Districts in Banat ===
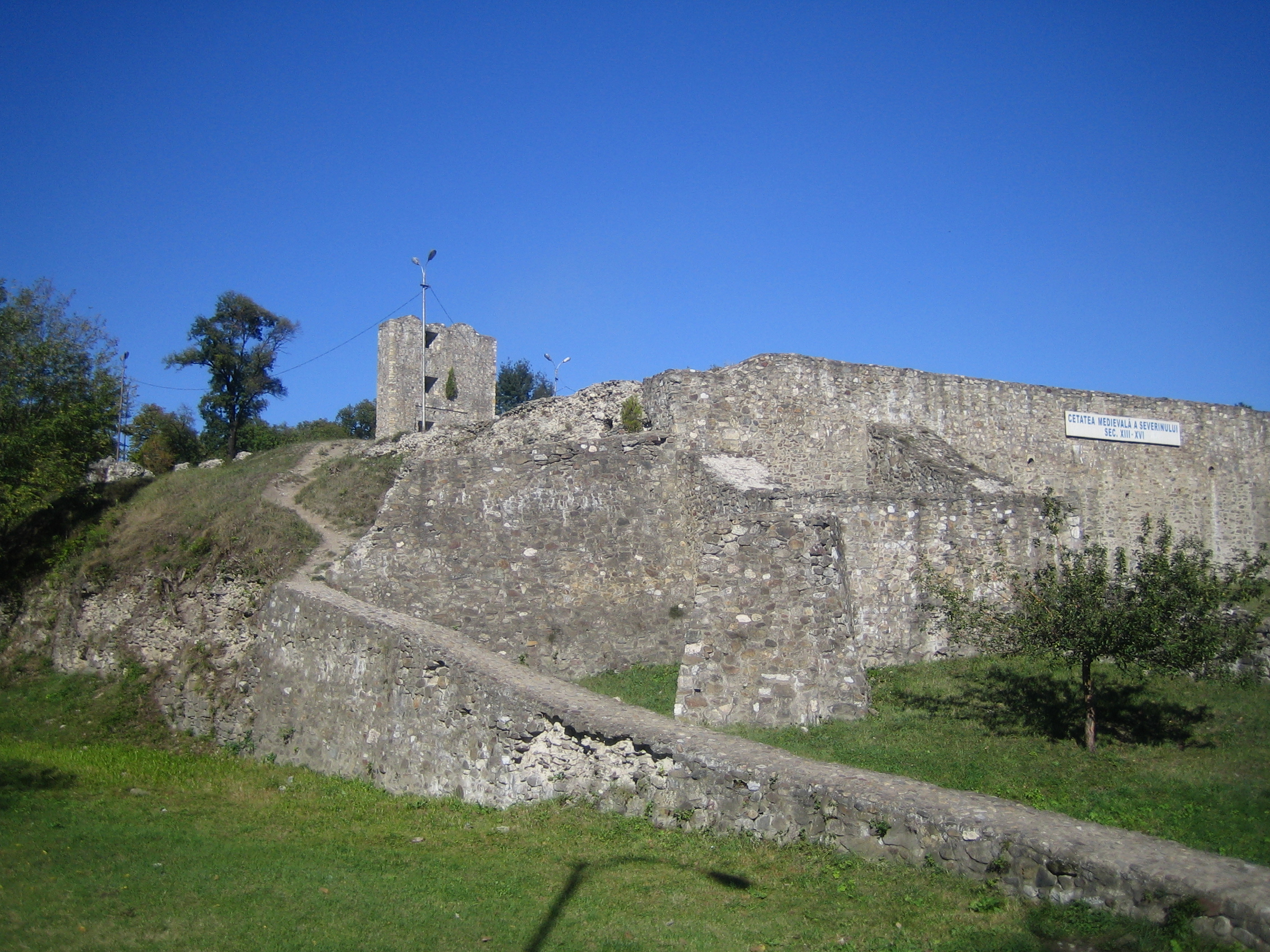
Ruins of the royal castle of Severin (now Drobeta-Turnu Severin in Romania): several Romanian districts in Banat were administered by the Bans of Severin

==== Almăj ====
The Almăj district was located along the upper course of the Nera River between the Semenic Mountains and the Anina Mountains. Royal charters and other documents from the 15th and 16th centuries show that at least fourteen villages (including Rudăria, Gârliște, Prilipeț, Prigor, Lăpușnicu Mare and Bozovici) were situated in the district. In a letter written on 21 August 1430, Nicolaus of Radawitz, the local commander of the Teutonic Knights, who was also Ban of Severin, referred to the knezes and nobles of Almăj, implying that the district had already come to existence. According to the letter, the knezes and nobles refused to accept the Ban's judgement in their conflict with Emeric Himfy. Almăj district (or pertinencis Halmas) was first mentioned when its representatives (Ioan of Săliște, Blasiu of Gârliște and Ioan, Dragomir's son) were present at the joint meeting of seven Romanian districts in 1452.

==== Bârzava ====
The Bârzava (or Borzafeu) district was located along the uppermost course of the Bârzava River. At least thirteen villages (including Câlnic, Vasiova and Bratova) were situated in the district, according to documents from the 14th and 15th centuries. The district was first mentioned in 1370 in a royal charter referring to one Peter's village "in pertinencibus Borzafeu".

==== Caraș ====
The Caraș (or Crasofeu) district was located between the Dognecea Mountains and the Anina Mountains at the headwaters of the river Karaš. A charter mentioned the domains attached to the royal fortress of Carașova ("castro Crasofeu") in 1358. Documents from the 14th-16th centuries show that at least seventeen villages were located in the district (including Goruia and Agadici).

==== Comiat ====
The Comiat (or Comyath) district was situated along the upper course of the Pogăniș River. It was first mentioned as provincia Comyath in a charter, issued on 13 March 1369, describing the boundaries of a neighboring domain. At least fifteen villages were located in the district (including Delinești, Ohabița and Apadia). The "nobles and knezes" of the district attended at a meeting which was presided by the Ban of Severin in 1391. Between 1435 and 1437, Sigismund of Luxemburg, King of Hungary, pledged the district to John Hunyadi. The local inhabitants paid the debt and the pledge was cancelled in 1457, showing that the local Romanians were willing to protect their autonomy.

==== Cuiești ====
The Cuiești (or Kuesd) district was located along the Bârzava River in the western slopes of the Dognecea Mountains. The district was first mentioned in a royal charter of grant, which was issued on 4 July 1349.

=== Maramureș ===
In Maramureș was present the Romanian Voivodeship of Maramureș.

== Sources ==
- Makkai, László (1994). "The Emergence of the Estates (1172–1526)". In Köpeczi, Béla; Barta, Gábor; Bóna, István; Makkai, László; Szász, Zoltán; Borus, Judit (eds.). History of Transylvania. Akadémiai Kiadó. pp. 178–243. ISBN 963-05-6703-2.
- Pop, Ioan-Aurel (2005). "Romanians in the 14th–16th centuries: From the "Christian Republic" to the "Restoration of Dacia"". In Pop, Ioan-Aurel; Bolovan, Ioan (eds.). History of Romania: Compendium. Romanian Cultural Institute (Center for Transylvanian Studies). pp. 209–314. ISBN 978-973-7784-12-4.
- Rady, Martyn (2000). Nobility, Land and Service in Medieval Hungary. Palgrave. ISBN 0-333-80085-0.
- Țeicu, Dumitru (2002). Mountainous Banat in the Middle Ages. University Press Cluj. ISBN 973-610-141-X.
