= Duka de Kádár family =

Duka de Kádár
- Nobility
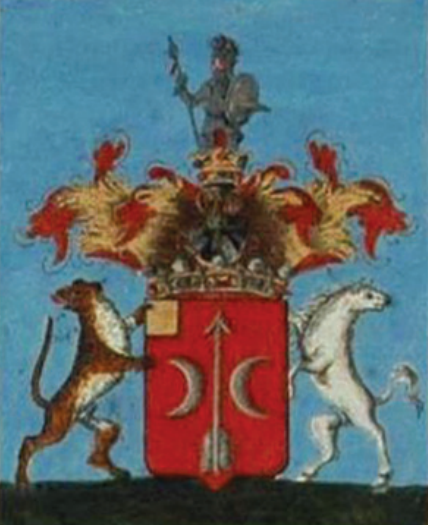
- Coat of arms of the Baronial House of Duka de Kádár (1816)
- Country: Initially the Kingdom of Slavonia, then Kingdom of Hungary, Austrian Empire, Austria-Hungary
- Current region: Banat
- Founder: Mihai Duka
- Titles: Baron (1816), Noble (1792)
- Estates: Kádár, Sipet, Delényes, Ernőháza

The Duka de Kádár family (also spelled Duka von Kádár or Duka de Kadar) was a noble family in the Kingdom of Hungary and the Habsburg Monarchy, of Aromanian and Serb descent. Originating from Moscopole, the family rose to prominence through commerce and distinguished military and diplomatic service to the House of Habsburg, eventually acquiring vast landholdings in the Banat region and being elevated to the rank of Baron.

== Origins and ennoblement ==
The family traces its roots to Moscopole (in present-day Albania), a major Aromanian cultural and commercial center in the 18th century. Due to repeated Ottoman invasions and persecution, the merchant Mihai Duka (Michael Duka) emigrated during his childhood with his family through the Balkan Peninsula and settled in Osijek (Eszék), Slavonia.

In Osijek, Mihai Duka established a successful merchant business trading in silk and luxury goods between the Ottoman Empire and Central Europe. On 26 July 1792, Emperor Francis II granted Mihai Duka, his wife Julia Lallos, their children, and their descendants a diploma of nobility along with a family coat of arms in recognition of their contributions to the imperial economy and the military valor of Mihai's son, Peter Duka, in campaigns against the Ottoman forces.

Over the time, the family was partially Serbianized culturally, due to the power dynamics within the Orthodox Church in Banat.

In their 1799 Hungarian patent of nobility, the Dukas were described as being descendants of the Byzantine Doukas family. However, as Austrian historian Max Demeter Peyfuss explained, there is little evidence to link the Duka family directly to the Byzantine rulers.

== Baronial status and landholdings ==
Peter Duka von Kádár received the baronial title in 1815

The family achieved high status through Mihai's second son, Peter Duka von Kadar (1756–1822). Starting his military career in the 13th Wallachian-Illyrian Border Regiment in Caransebeș, he rose to the rank of Feldzeugmeister (field marshal) and served as General Commander of the Banat. In 1806, he purchased the estate of Kádár (now Cadăr, Timiș County, Romania) for 98,630 florins, constructing a manor house there in 1810.

On 17 July 1816, Emperor Francis I elevated Petru Duka to the rank of Hungarian Baron, extending the baronial title to his brothers Ilie and Nicolae, and to Nicolae's male descendants. On 26 July 1816, the estate of Kádár was conferred as a formal royal donation, granting the family the predicate de Kádár (or von Kádár). Previously, Petru was ganted baronial title in the Kingdom of Bohemia on 22 April 1815. Petru Duka subsequently acquired additional domains, including Sipet (1818).

As Field Marshal Petru Duka had no direct issue, the family estates were divided among the sons of his brother Nicolae:

- Peter II Duka (1787–1863) inherited the estate of Sipet.
- Baron Istvan/Ștefan Duka de Kádár (1801–1867) inherited the primary seat at Kádár.

The estate at Kádár later passed to Ștefan's son, Baron Emil Duka (1835–1885), who married Katarina von Karátsonyi de Beodra in 1866. Their only child, Baron Géza Duka de Kádár (1867–1913), expanded the family's landholdings to include holdings in Ernőháza, Delényes, and Sasca Montană, spanning thousands of acres across Timiș County, Torontál County, and Caraș-Severin County.

== Heraldry ==
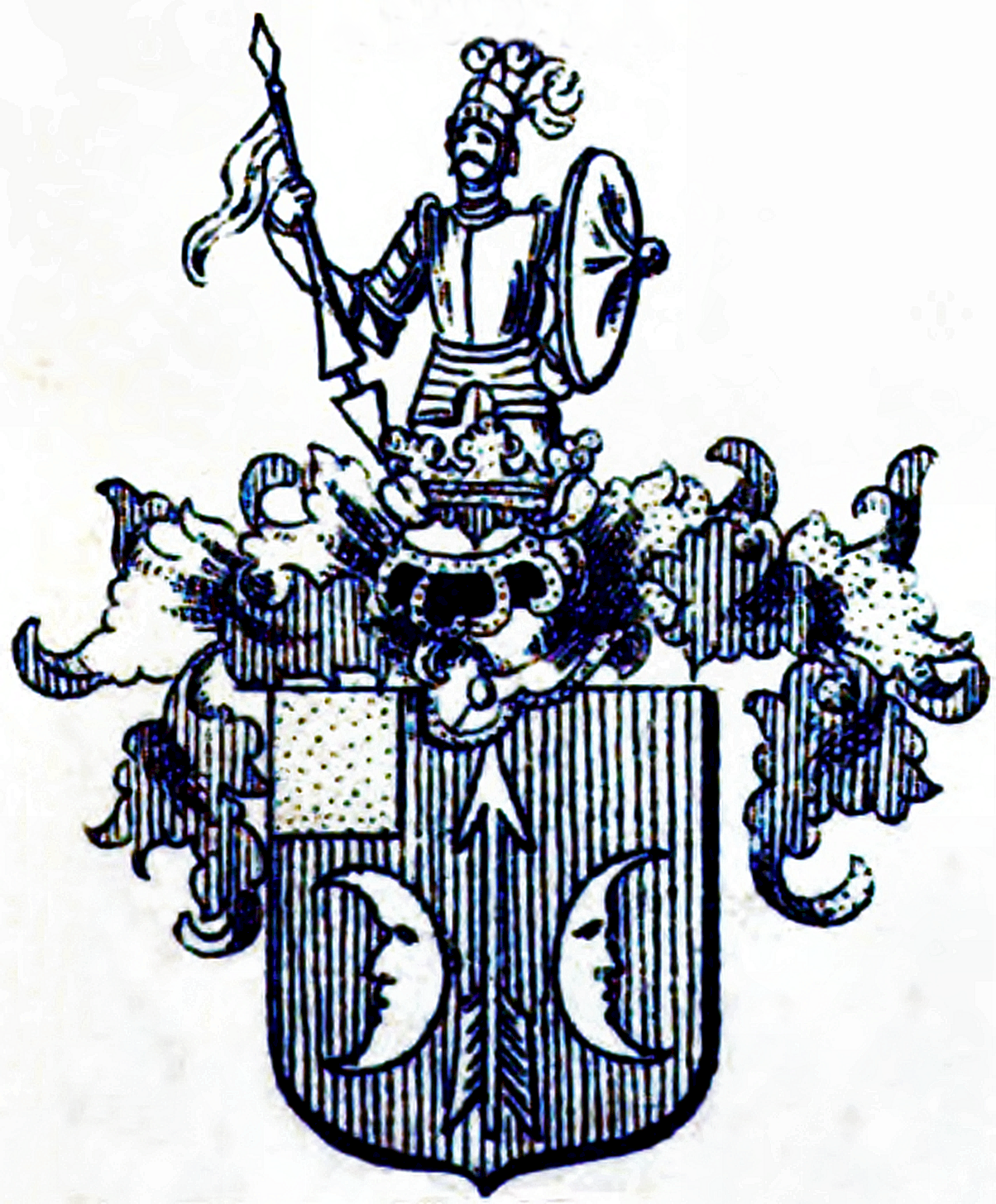
The 1792 Hungarian Coat of Arms

The family was granted two official coats of arms:

- 1792 Noble Coat of Arms: A French shield, red (gules), featuring a silver arrow in pale flanked by two silver crescents (the dexter inverted, the sinister contourné), with a gold canton in the dexter chief. The shield is crowned with a helmet surmounting a crown, from which emerges an armored soldier holding a spear in his right hand and a round shield in his left.
- 1816 Baronial Coat of Arms: Retains the core red shield, silver arrow, crescents, and gold canton. The shield is surmounted by a baronial crown with five visible pearls and flanked by two heraldic supporters: a rampant leopard on the dexter side and a cabochon white horse on the sinister side.

== Notable family members ==
- Baron Petru Duka de Kádár (1756–1822), Feldzeugmeister in the Imperial Austrian Army, State Councilor, General Commander of the Banat, and recipient of the Knight's Cross of the Military Order of Maria Theresa
- Baron Ilya Mikhailovich Duka (1768–1830), General of the Cavalry of the Russian Imperial Army
- Baron Géza Duka de Kádár (1867–1913), diplomat, member of the House of Magnates and the House of Representatives.

== Philanthropy, downfall, and legacy ==
The Duka de Kádár family were prominent benefactors of the Serb, Aromanian and Romanian Orthodox communities in the Banat. In 1903–1904, Baron Géza Duka and his wife, Baroness Johanna Nikolics de Rudna, constructed a new Orthodox church in Cadăr and established a family vault beneath the altar. In September 1907, the remains of Feldzeugmeister Peter Duka were exhumed from Vienna and reinterred in the family crypt in Cadăr. The family also funded local schools and paid teacher salaries in the region.

The male line of the family came to an end with the sudden death of Baron Géza Duka de Kádár in Vienna on 21 February 1913, leaving no children. The family's era effectively concluded in May 1917, when his widow, Baroness Johanna, was murdered at the Cadăr manor. Following legal disputes among collateral heirs and the aftermath of World War I, the family estate in Cadăr fell into disrepair and the main manor house was demolished in 1929.
