= Pogăniș =

Pogăniș Pogănici
- Location within Romania

Location
- Country: Romania
- Counties: Caraș-Severin, Timiș

Physical characteristics
- Source: Semenic Mountains
- Mouth: Timiș
  - location: Uliuc
  - coordinates: 45.6826°N 21.3513°E
- Length: 97 km (60 mi)
- Basin size: 667 km^{2} (258 sq mi)

Basin features
- Progression: Timiș→ Danube→ Black Sea

The Pogăniș or Pogănici is a left tributary of the river Timiș in Romania. It discharges into the Timiș in Uliuc. It flows through the villages Ohabița, Delinești, Brebu, Zorlențu Mare, Dezești, Remetea-Pogănici, Duleu, Valeapai, Vermeș, Cadăr, Blajova, Otvești, Icloda and Uliuc.

== Tributaries ==
The following rivers are tributaries to the river Pogăniș:

- Left: Străjești, Igăzău, Valea Popii, Tău, Secu
- Right: Valea Calului, Valea Ștefii, Tramnic, Valea Satului
