= Peter Duka von Kadar =

Austrian officer (1756–1822)

Petar Freiherr Duka von Kadar
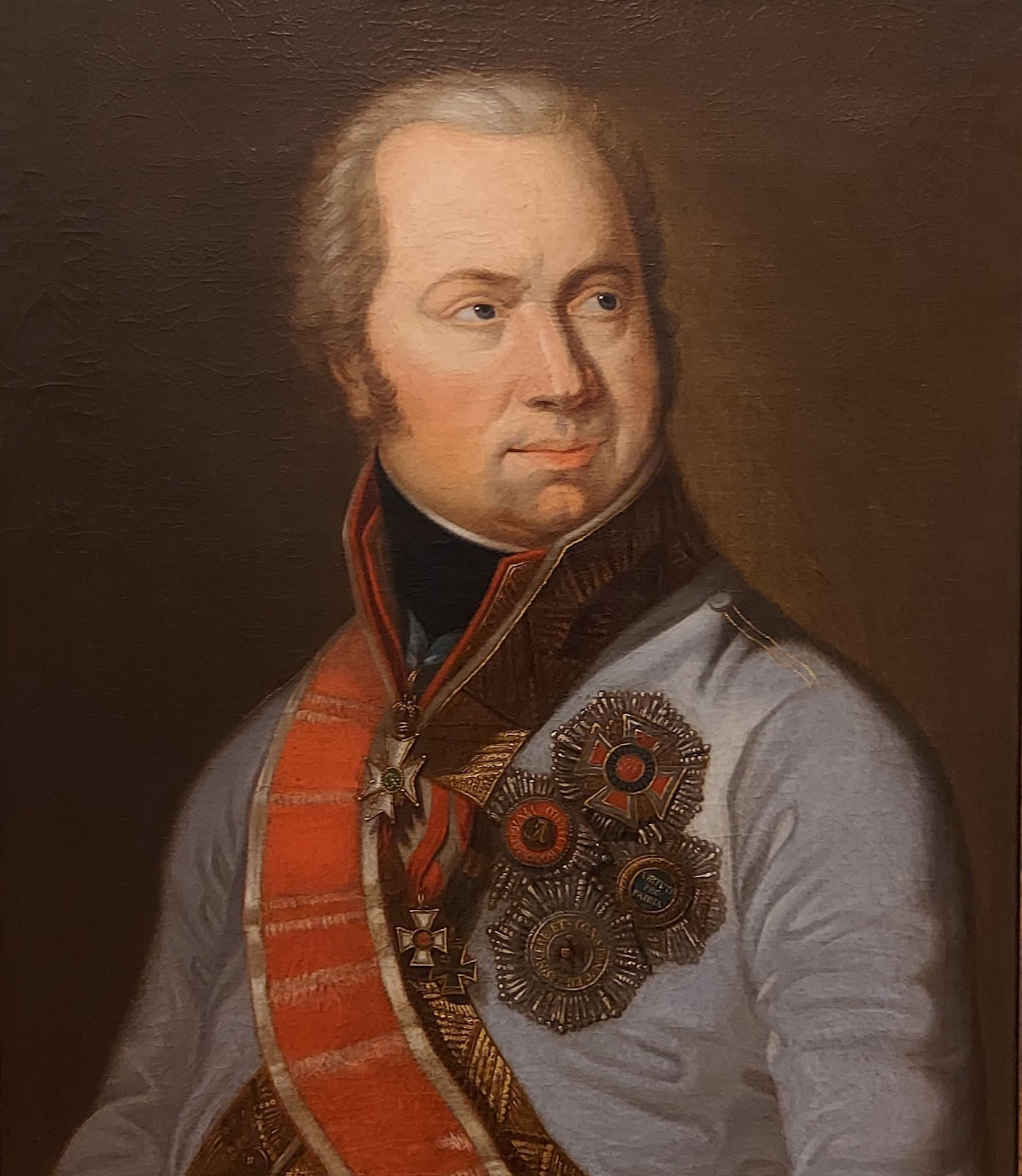
- Portrait of Field Marshal Duka by Arsenije Teodorović, 1821 (National Museum of Serbia)
- Born: 1756; Esseg, Kingdom of Slavonia, Austrian Empire
- Died: 29 December 1822 (aged 65–66); Vienna, Austrian Empire
- Military career
- Allegiance: Habsburg Monarchy; Austrian Empire
- Branch: Army
- Service years: 1773–1822
- Rank: Feldzeugmeister
- Wars: Napoleonic Wars

Peter Freiherr Duka von Kádár (Serbian Cyrillic: Петар Дука, Romanian: Petru Duca; 1756 - 29 December 1822) was an Austrian officer (Feldzeugmeister), Inhaber of the Hungarian Infantry Regiment No. 39 as well as a Geheimer Rat (privy councillor), he was a recipient of the Knight's Cross of the Military Order of Maria Theresa. He is remembered as a great adversary of Napoleon and to have negotiated an armistice with the French Emperor at Lusigny-sur-Barse.

== Biography ==
Duka was born in Osijek in 1756, into an Aromanian family integrated into the Serbian Orthodox Church. The Dukas were Aromanians from Voskopoje. Peter's father, Michael, was born there and later settled in Osijek. In their 1799 Hungarian patent of nobility, the Dukas were described as being descendants of the Byzantine Doukas family. However, as Austrian historian Max Demeter Peyfuss explained, there is little evidence to link the Duka family directly to the Byzantine rulers. He has also been described as of Croatian Serb or Greek origin. His younger brother, Ilya, was also a general, but in the service of the Russian Empire.

He enrolled in a military college in late 1773. In 1776, Duka joined the 13th Wallach-Illyrian (Romanian/Serbian) Regiment in Caransebeş as a cadet, but two years later, he was transferred to the General Staff as a Leutnant lieutenant for his obvious abilities. In 1787, he was promoted to Hauptmann captain.

Promoted to Major on 1 December 1789, he was assigned to the army under Prince Josias of Saxe-Coburg-Saalfeld in the Austrian Netherlands in 1793. After having reconnoitered the area extensively for three days before the Battle of Famars on 23 May 1793, he led the decisive attack from the main column in four divisions (small columns), each led by a Cavalry artillery battery. He was able to communicate the main objectives to the Director of Artillery Oberstleutnant (Lieutenant Colonel) Karl Freiherr von Rouvroy and led the fourth division himself. After further distinguished conduct at Wattignies on 15–16 October, followed by the battles of Berlaimont and Maubeuge, together with the sieges of Landrecies in April and Charleroi, he was rewarded on 1 May 1794 with promotion to Oberstleutnant (Lieutenant Colonel). On 7 July 1794, he received the Knight's Cross of the Military Order of Maria Theresa.

In 1795, Duka was appointed Generalquartiermeister (Chief of Staff) to General Wurmser's Army of the Upper Rhine and he planned the successful attack on Mannheim, which was held by Pichegru's Armée de la Rhin-et-la Moselle on 22 November. On 24 February 1796, Duka was promoted to Oberst colonel and accompanied Wurmser in his attempts to relieve the French siege of Mantua. However, his plan was defeated by the victory of Napoleon at the Battle of Castiglione on 5 August 1796. On 31 May 1798, he was promoted to Generalmajor major general and was assigned to Archduke Charles's military staff in Prague, staying with the Archduke to join the Army general staff in Germany a year later. There he directed Feldmarschalleutnant (Lieutenant-General) Joseph Staader von Adelsheim's left-wing in the successful defensive actions during the victory at the Battle of Stockach on 25 March 1799.

In 1800, Duka was appointed as fortress commander of Temesvar until December, when he returned to Vienna to be Chief of the General Staff of the Army of Germany. On 20 March 1801, Duka was appointed Chief of the General Staff by Archduke Charles, the first peacetime Chief in the world, where he was regarded as old school and rather cautious. This was followed by promotion to Feldmarschalleutnant Lieutenant-General on 20 May 1801 and on 7 October 1803, he became Inhaber (honorary colonel) the Hungarian Infantry Regiment No. 39. After power struggles in the Austrian military leadership and government, in April 1805, Duka was banished from Vienna as General Commanding the Banat Military Frontier. He held this office until his death. In 1808 the emperor granted him the rank of Freiherr (Baron) with the Predikat 'von Kádár' for himself and his legitimate descendants.

On 2 September 1813, Duka was promoted to Feldzeugmeister (General) and Adjutant General of Emperor Francis II as well as his confidante in military matters. In these capacities, he was sent to Lusigny-sur-Barse to negotiate an armistice with Napoleon.

In Vienna, the Emperor elevated Duka to the Bohemian nobility with the rank of Freiherr/Inkolat on 22 April 1815. On 26 July 1816, he was also ennobled into the Hungarian nobility class and appointed a Real Geheimrat, as well as state and conference council. He died on 29 December 1822 in Vienna.

== Awards ==
General Peter Duka was a recipient of numerous decorations, including:

- Knight's Cross of the Military Order of Maria Theresa (1794)
- Grand Cross of the Order of Leopold (1813)
- Army cross for 1813-1814
- Grand Cross of the Royal Bavarian Max Joseph Order (1814)
- Grand Cross of the Ordre royal et militaire de Saint-Louis (1816)
- Royal Prussian Order of the Red Eagle, 1st Class (1813)
- Imperial Russian Order of St. Anne, 1st Class (1813)
- Order of Alexander Nevsky (1813)
- Royal Neapolitan-Sicilian Order of January (1819)

== Family ==
Peter Duka von Kádár

In 1806, Duka bought the community of Cadăr (pronounced "Kadar"), which is located near the river Pogăniș in Timiș County, three miles south of Timiș Castle. The predicate Kádár in the nobility letter of 1815 refers to this estate. The 748 inhabitants, spread over 134 houses, were predominantly Romanian speakers and of the Eastern Orthodox denomination under the jurisdiction of the Eparchy of Timișoara at the time. His sons Stephan, Emil, Eugen, and Peter inherited the village after his death. His granddaughter Anastasia (born 31 October 1828 in Belatincz, Zala County, Hungary; died 27 March 1907 in Graz) married Count Vincenz von Logothetti (1824–1886).

== See also ==
- Duka, surname
- Géza Duka de Kádár

== Sources ==
- Jaromir Hirtenfeld: The Military Maria Theresa Order and its members. Volume 1, K. K. Hof- und Staatsdruckerei, Vienna 1857
- Constantin von Wurzbach: Duka, Peter Freiherr von. In: Biographisches Lexikon des Kaiserthums Oesterreich. 3rd part. Typogr.-literar.-artist publishing house. Establishment (L. C. Zamarski, C. Dittmarsch & Comp.), Vienna 1858, p. 389 f. (Digitized version).
- Wilhelm Edler von Janko: Duka, Peter Freiherr von. In: Allgemeine Deutsche Biographie (ADB). Volume 5, Duncker & Humblot, Leipzig 1877, p. 455.
- Duka von Kadar, Friedrich (Peter) Frh .. In: Austrian Biographical Lexicon 1815–1950 (ÖBL). Volume 1, Verlag der Österreichischen Akademie der Wissenschaften, Vienna 1957, p. 203.
- David Hollins: Austrian Commanders of the Napoleonic Wars 1792-1815. Osprey Publishing, Oxford 2004, ISBN 1-84176-664-X.
- Antonio Schmidt-Brentano: Imperial and k. k. Generals (1618-1815). Austrian State Archives / A. Schmidt-Brentano 2006.
- Tötösy de Zepetnek, Steven, ed. Nobilitashungariae: List of Historical Names of the Hungarian Nobility / A magyar történelmi nemesség családneveinek listája. West Lafayette: Purdue University Press, 2010-. nobilitashungariae: List of Historical Surnames of the Hungarian Nobility.
