= Pogăniș Meadow =

Protected area in Romania

- IUCN category IV (habitat/species management area)
- Location within Romania
- Location: Timiș County, Romania
- Coordinates: 45°33′45″N 21°29′31″E
- Area: 75.5 ha (187 acres)
- Established: 1974, 2000

Pogăniș Meadow (Romanian: Lunca Pogănișului) is a nationally protected area, classified as an IUCN Category IV botanical nature reserve, located in Timiș County, within the administrative boundaries of the Sacoșu Turcesc and Tormac communes. Initially established in 1974, it was officially designated as a protected area in 2000.

The reserve aims to conserve the habitat of the snake's head (Fritillaria meleagris), a Mediterranean species belonging to the Liliaceae family and protected under the Bern Convention. In Romania, it occurs in wetland areas across the counties of Timiș, Bistrița-Năsăud, Gorj, Brașov, and Suceava.

== Location ==
The 75.5-hectare natural area is situated in the central region of Timiș County, within the Pogăniș Valley basin (a left tributary of the Timiș River), close to the county road (DJ592A) linking Tormac and Stamora Română.

The Pogăniș is one of the few southeastern tributaries of the Timiș River, draining a significant portion of the hilly terrain south of Buziaș. Essentially a stream, it tends to nearly dry up during the summer months. Its generally well-defined channel, extending from Cadăr to Otvești over approximately 8 kilometers, divides into multiple branches that can be up to 1.5 kilometers apart, creating an area prone to flooding with consistently high moisture levels. Due to the area's limited suitability for agriculture, numerous forest clusters have been preserved, predominantly composed of oak, ash, acacia, and poplar, which contribute to a distinctive mosaic landscape.

== Description ==
The nature reserve was designated as a protected area by Law No. 5 of March 6, 2000, and encompasses a region within the Pogăniș River basin characterized by tree clusters including pedunculate oak (Quercus robur), field maple (Acer campestre), ash (Fraxinus excelsior), field elm (Ulmus minor), hornbeam (Carpinus betulus), wild pear (Pyrus pyraster), and crab apple (Malus sylvestris), alongside shrub species such as dogwood (Cornus sanguinea), blackthorn (Prunus spinosa), hawthorn (Crataegus monogyna), and Tatar maple (Acer tataricum). Two species declared natural monuments grow there, Fritillaria meleagris and Ruscus aculeatus.
