= Géza Duka de Kádár =

Baron Géza Duka de Kádár
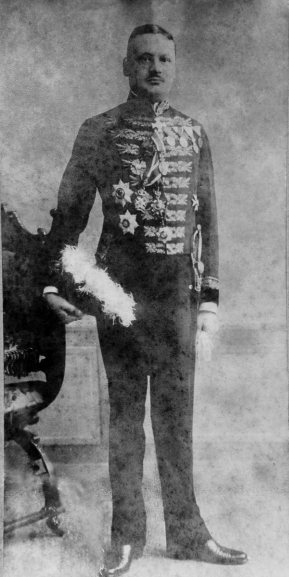

Austro-Hungarian Legation Attaché to the Kingdom of Greece
- In office 1895–1897

Austro-Hungarian Legation Secretary to the Kingdom of Serbia
- In office 1898–1901

Austro-Hungarian Principal Legation Secretary and Consul to the Kingdom of Württemberg
- In office 1901–1905

Austro-Hungarian Principal Legation Secretary to the Ottoman Empire
- In office 1905–1906

Austro-Hungarian First Secretary and Chargé d'Affaires to the Kingdom of the Netherlands
- In office 1907–1908

Member of the House of Magnates
- In office 18 December 1893 – 4 August 1910

Member of the National Assembly
- In office 23 June 1910 – 21 January 1913

Personal details
- Born: January 2, 1867 Kádár, Austrian Empire (present-day Cadăr, Timiș County, Romania)
- Died: February 21, 1913 (aged 46) Vienna, Austria-Hungary
- Party: National Party of Work
- Spouse: Baroness Johanna Nikolics de Rudna (m. 1892–1913)
- Education: Consular Academy of Vienna
- Occupation: Diplomat, politician, businessman

Baron Géza István Duka de Kádár (2 January 1867 – 21 February 1913) was an Austro-Hungarian diplomat, politician, and landowner of Aromanian and Serb origin. A member of the noble Duka de Kádár family, he served in Austro-Hungarian diplomatic missions in Athens, Belgrade, Stuttgart, Constantinople, and The Hague. He later became a member of the Hungarian House of Magnates and served in the Hungarian House of Representatives as a deputy for Sasca Montană.

== Early life and lineage ==
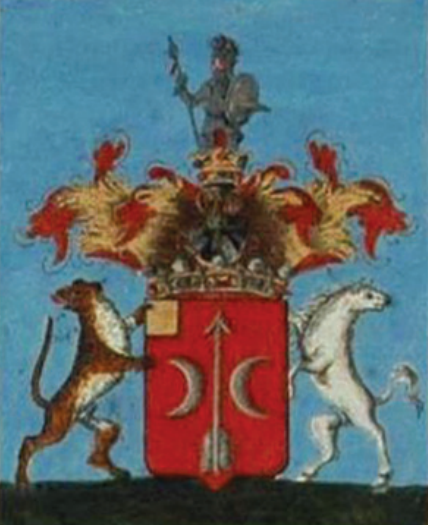
The Coat of Arms of the Duka de Kádár family, granted in 1816

Géza Duka was born on 2 January 1867 in Kádár (now Cadăr, Romania) into a prominent Aromanian family originating from Moscopole. His ancestor, Mihai Duka, a merchant from Osijek, was ennobled by Emperor Francis II in 1792. The family gained higher prominence through Géza's grand-uncle, Feldzeugmeister Baron Peter Duka de Kádár, a distinguished military officer who was raised to the rank of baron in 1816 and granted the estate of Kádár in the Banat.

Géza was the only child of Baron Emil Duka (1835–1885) and Katarina von Karátsonyi de Beodra (d. 1891), of noble Armenian ancestry. Raised in the Eastern Orthodox faith, he was polyglot who spoke 12 languages, including native European languages, ancient languages, and Oriental languages.

== Education and early career ==
Duka entered the Consular Academy of Vienna on 8 October 1885 and graduated with a diplomatic title on 30 September 1890. Following a brief internship at the Austro-Hungarian General Consulate in Bucharest under Consul General Alexander de Sussara, he was recommended for the diplomatic service with the support of Hungarian Prime Minister Dezső Bánffy and Foreign Minister Count Gustav Kálnoky.

== Diplomatic career ==
In 1895, Duka began his diplomatic career as an attaché at the Austro-Hungarian legation in Athens under Baron Gustav Karl von Kosjek. His appointment coincided with heightened geopolitical tensions in the eastern Mediterranean, including the Cretan crisis and the Greco-Turkish War (1897). In recognition of his service, he was awarded the Gold Cross of the Greek Order of the Redeemer.

In 1898, Duka was promoted to Legation Secretary at the Austro-Hungarian embassy in Belgrade, serving under Minister Franz Schießl von Perstorff. His familial ties to the Obrenović dynasty through his wife's family facilitated his diplomatic role at the Serbian court. During his tenure in Serbia, he received the Order of the White Eagle (Commander) and the Grand Cross of the Order of the Cross of Takovo. In February 1901, following the death of former King Milan I in Vienna, Duka was among the few official representatives permitted to accompany the royal funeral procession to the Krušedol Monastery.

Later in 1901, Duka was transferred to the legation in Stuttgart as First Legation Secretary, serving for nearly five years until 1905. During his posting in the Kingdom of Württemberg, he was awarded the Cross of Honor of the Order of the Crown (Württemberg), the Knight's Cross First Class of the Order of the Zähringer Lion (Baden), and the Cross of Honor of the Order of Philip the Magnanimous (Hesse).

In late 1905, he was posted as First Legation Secretary to the Austro-Hungarian embassy in Constantinople under Ambassador Johann von Pallavicini, where he was decorated with the Ottoman Order of Osmanieh. In 1907, he was appointed First Legation Secretary and chargé d'affaires at the embassy in The Hague.

== Political and economic activities ==
Duka stepped down from active diplomatic service in 1908 to focus on politics and managing his extensive family estates, which included holdings in Kádár, Ernőháza (now Ernestinovo), and Delényes (now Delinești). As an hereditary member of the House of Magnates, he acted as a mediator between the Hungarian government and the Romanian national movement in Banat and Transylvania.

In 1910, Duka successfully ran as a government-backed candidate for the Hungarian House of Representatives, winning the electoral district of Sasca Montană in Caraș-Severin County. He maintained close relations with Romanian political leaders, including Valeriu Braniște and future Patriarch Miron Cristea, supporting Romanian political representation and cultural initiatives, such as the Romanian-language newspaper Drapelul in Lugoj, with a strong Romanian nationalist orientation.

Duka was also active in commerce and industry. In 1910, he co-founded the South Hungarian Credit Institute and served on its board of directors. In January 1913, he established the Banat Mining Society with Belgian and French capital investment to extract iron and ferromanganese ores on his estate in Delinești.

== Philanthropy and local legacy ==
In 1903, Duka and his wife funded the construction of a new Romanian Orthodox church in his home village of Kádár, donating 19,000 crowns. The church was consecrated in October 1904. Under the central apse of the altar, he built a family crypt where the remains of his ancestors were reinterred.

In September 1907, Duka arranged for the exhumation of his grand-uncle, Feldzeugmeister Petru Duka, from his burial site in Vienna and had his remains solemnly transferred to the family crypt in Kádár. Duka was also a benefactor of local education, championing Romanian-language education for ethnic Romanians, covering the salary of the village schoolteacher and providing financial assistance to local students.

== Personal life and death ==
On 16 June 1892, Duka married Baroness Johanna (Jeanna) Nikolics de Rudna (1870–1917) at the Serbian church in Budapest. She was the daughter of Baron Fedor Nikolics de Rudna, civil governor of Bosnia and Herzegovina, and the granddaughter of Princess Jelisaveta Savka Obrenović of Serbia. The couple had no children.

In January 1913, while in Paris on business related to his mining venture, Duka fell ill. After returning to Vienna, he suffered acute appendicitis and underwent surgery at the Löw Sanatorium. Following post-operative complications, he died of an embolism on 21 February 1913 at the age of 46. His funeral was conducted by Bishop Miron Cristea, and he was buried in the family crypt at Cadăr.

Following his death, his widow Johanna managed the family estates until May 1917, when she was murdered at the estate in Cadăr by a former employee following a dispute over draft exemption documents. The family mansion was later demolished in 1929.

== Honors and awards ==
- (Kingdom of Greece) Order of the Redeemer (Gold Cross)
- (Kingdom of Romania) Order of the Crown of Romania (Knight)
- (Kingdom of Serbia) Order of the White Eagle (3rd Class / Commander)
- (Kingdom of Serbia) Order of the Cross of Takovo (Grand Cross)
- (Kingdom of Württemberg) Order of the Crown (Württemberg) (Cross of Honor)
- (Grand Duchy of Baden) Order of the Zähringer Lion (Knight First Class)
- (Grand Duchy of Hesse) Order of Philip the Magnanimous (Cross of Honor)
- (Luxembourg) Order of the Oak Crown
- (Ottoman Empire) Order of Osmanieh
- (Ottoman Empire) Order of Medjidie
- Orthodox Order of the Holy Sepulchre
