= Tău (river) =

- Location within Romania

Location
- Country: Romania
- Counties: Caraș-Severin County
- Villages: Soceni, Ezeriș, Fârliug

Physical characteristics
- Mouth: Pogăniș
  - coordinates: 45.4955°N 21.8847°E
- Length: 27 km (17 mi)
- Basin size: 117 km^{2} (45 sq mi)

Basin features
- Progression: Pogăniș→ Timiș→ Danube→ Black Sea
- Tributaries
  - left: Valea Satului

The Tău is a left tributary of the river Pogăniș in Romania. It discharges into the Pogăniș near Fârliug. Its length is 27 km (17 mi) and its basin size is 117 km^{2} (45 sq mi).
