= Stamora =

Stamora may refer to one of two places in Timiș County, Romania:

- Stamora Germană, a village in Moravița Commune
- Stamora Română, a village in Sacoșu Turcesc Commune
