= Daruvár =

Daruvár may refer to:

- Daruvar, a city in Croatia
- Daruvár, the Hungarian name for Darova Commune, Timiș County, Romania
