= Perlo =

Perlo may refer to:

== Places ==
- Perlo, Piedmont, a comune in the Province of Cuneo, Italy
- Perlő, the Hungarian name for Brebu Commune, Caraş-Severin County, Romania

== People ==
- Phil Perlo, American football player
- Victor Perlo, an American economist

== Other uses ==
- Perlo group, an American network of Soviet espionage agents
