= Igăzău =

- Location within Romania

Location
- Country: Romania
- Counties: Caraș-Severin County

Physical characteristics
- Mouth: Pogăniș
  - location: Valeadeni
  - coordinates: 45.4168°N 22.0267°E
- Length: 18 km (11 mi)
- Basin size: 36 km^{2} (14 sq mi)

Basin features
- Progression: Pogăniș→ Timiș→ Danube→ Black Sea

The Igăzău is a left tributary of the river Pogăniș in Romania. It flows into the Pogăniș near Valeadeni. Its length is 18 km (11 mi) and its basin size is 36 km^{2} (14 sq mi).
