= Caput Bubali (castra) =

Fort in the Roman province of Dacia

- *Castra of Cornuțel; Castra of Delinești; Castra of Păltiniș; Gubali (Ravenna Cosmography)
- Location within Romania
- 45.422004°N 22.085281°E
- Location: Delinești, Caraș-Severin, Romania

History
- Founded: not specified (after 106 AD)
- Abandoned: not specified (around 270 AD)

Site notes
- Elevation: 295 m (968 ft)
- Condition: Ruined

Castrum Caput Bubali was a fort in the Roman province of Dacia. It is located in Delinești (commune Păltiniș, Romania).

== See also ==
- List of castra
