= Fedor Nikolić =

Baron Fedor Nikolić de Rudna
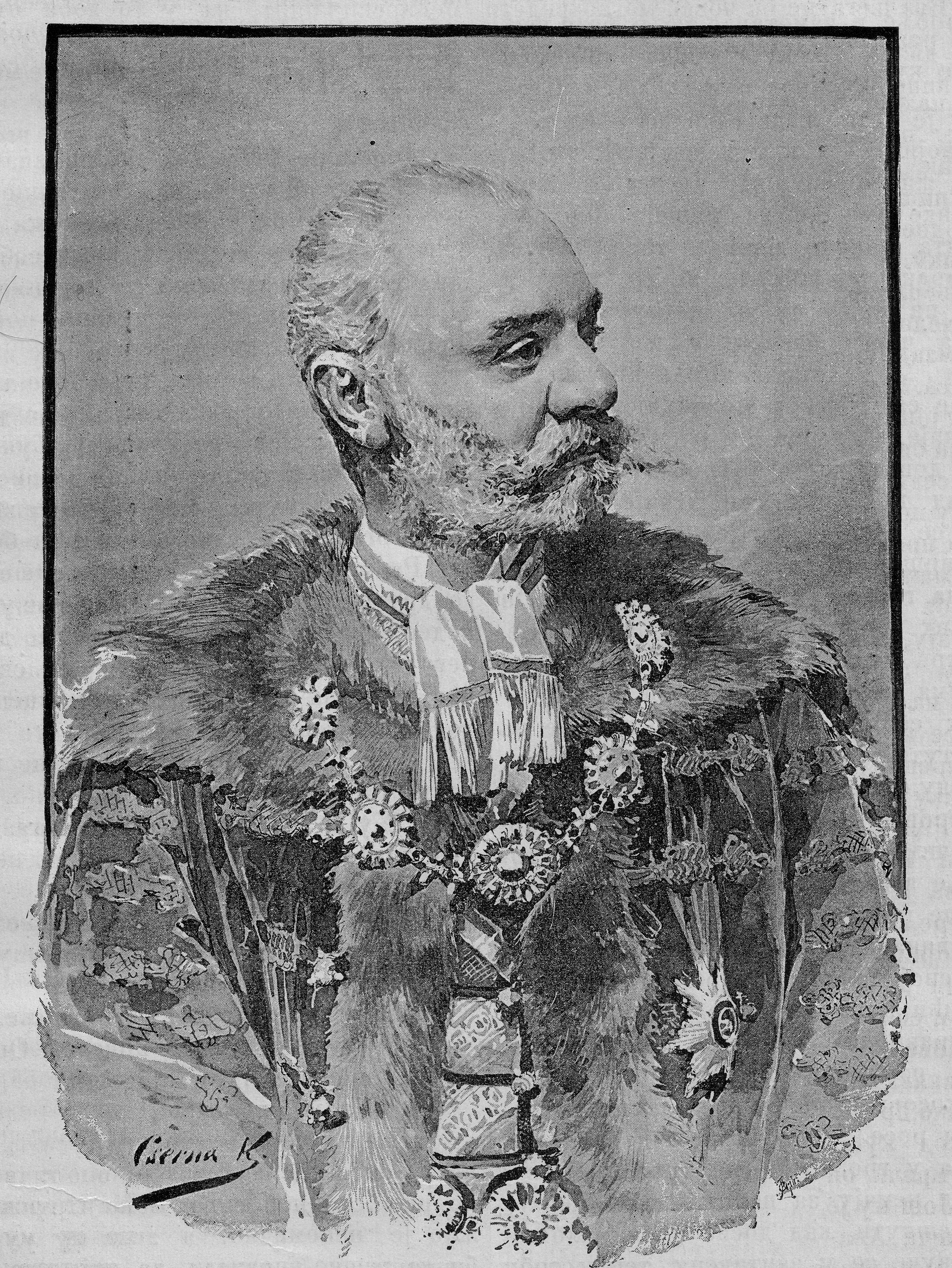

Civil Adlatus of Bosnia and Herzegovina
- In office 1 August 1882 – November 1886

Member of the House of Magnates
- In office 8 March 1886 – 27 February 1903

Member of the National Assembly of Hungary
- In office 6 April 1861 – 22 August 1861
- In office 10 January 1866 – 19 November 1866
- In office 28 September 1887 – 3 October 1896

Personal details
- Born: Fedor Nikolics; June 7, 1836 Temesvár, Kingdom of Hungary, Austrian Empire (present-day Romania)
- Died: February 27, 1903 (aged 66) Rudna, Torontál County, Kingdom of Hungary, Austria-Hungary (present-day Romania)
- Party: Address Party, Deák Party, Liberal Party
- Spouse: Wilhelmina Hirsch (1879)
- Children: 5 (including Fedor II, Jeanne, Elisabeth)
- Parent(s): János Nikolics de Rudna; Princess Elisabeta (Eliza) Obrenović
- Relatives: Miloš Obrenović (grandfather); Mihailo Obrenović (uncle); Géza Duka de Kádár (son-in-law)
- Education: University of Graz
- Known for: Civil Adlatus (civil governor) of Bosnia and Herzegovina, Hungarian MP, Royal Commissioner to the Serbian Orthodox Church Congress

Baron Fedor Nikolić de Rudna (Hungarian: rudnai báró Nikolics Fedor; Serbian: Федор Николић од Рудне; German: Teodor Freiherr Nicolics von Rudna; 7 June 1836 – 27 February 1903) was an Austro-Hungarian nobleman, landowner, politician, diplomat, and imperial official of Serbian descent.

A grandson of Miloš Obrenović, Prince of Serbia, Nikolić played an important role in the public and political life of the Kingdom of Hungary and the Austro-Hungarian Empire. He served as a member of the Diet of Hungary, Imperial and Royal Privy Councillor, Főispán, Civil Adlatus (civil governor) of the Condominium of Bosnia and Herzegovina, and Royal Commissioner to the Serbian Orthodox Church Congress. He was also one of the largest landowners and financiers in Vojvodina and Banat and he was considered the second wealthiest Serb in Austria-Hungary, after Lazar Dunđerski.

== Early life and family ==
Fedor Nikolić was born on 7 June 1836 in Temesvár (now Timișoara, Romania). He was the second son of Baron János Nikolics de Rudna (1810–1880), a prominent landowner of the Macedonia estate in Torontál County, and Princess Elisabeta "Eliza" Obrenović (1814–1848), daughter of the reigning Prince of Serbia, Miloš Obrenović. His mother died while he was still young. Austrian historian Max Demeter Peyfuss described the Nikolics family as being of Aromanian origin.

On 18 November 1854, the Austrian baronial title was conferred upon his father János and extended to his sons Miloš, Fedor, and Mihály. Fedor received confirmation of the Hungarian baronial dignity with hereditary membership in the House of Magnates on 10 February 1886.

Nikolić attended gymnasium in Temesvár and Vienna before studying law at the University of Graz, completing his studies in 1858. Following his graduation, he served as an administrative trainee at the imperial governorship in Temesvár under Count Johann Baptist Coronini-Cronberg until the issuance of the October Diploma in 1860. On 27 June 1862, he passed the bar examination and briefly practiced law under the guidance of attorney von Sulnok in Temesvár.

== Political and diplomatic career ==
=== Early parliamentary career ===
Nikolić in 1865

Nikolić entered political life in 1861 when he was elected to the Diet of Hungary as a representative for the Párdány district (now Međa) in Torontál County. Aligning himself with the Deák Party, he acted as the assembly's recording secretary (korjegyző). In the 1865 parliament, he represented the Zsombolya (Jimbolia) district, though he resigned his mandate in 1867.

Between 1867 and 1868, Nikolić traveled extensively across Western Europe, spending significant time in London and Brussels studying public administration, economics, and civil institutions.

=== Obrenović inheritance and cultural patron ===
Following the assassination of his maternal uncle, Prince Mihailo Obrenović of Serbia, in Belgrade on 10 June 1868, Nikolić and his father traveled to Serbia. Together with other heirs, he reached a settlement with Prince Mihailo's widow, Princess Júlia Hunyady de Kéthely. Under the final inheritance agreement signed in Bucharest on 8 June 1873, Nikolić inherited substantial estates in the Kingdom of Romania, including Mavrodin and Buzescu in Teleorman County, Tămădaea-Tămășești in Ilfov County, and a portion of Andrășești.

During the late 1870s, Nikolić engaged actively in Serbian cultural life. In December 1878, he was elected to the executive committee of the Serbian National Theatre in Novi Sad. On 18 September 1880, he became an official member of the cultural society Matica Srpska, which awarded him one of its highest distinctions for a successful diplomatic mission carried out in Romania. In 1880, the Austro-Hungarian Ministry of Foreign Affairs also entrusted him with diplomatic missions to the Baltic governorates of the Russian Empire. He was a founder of the patriotic newspaper Srpski Dnevnik and later served as president of the Serbian Orthodox religious community in Budapest.

=== Civil Adlatus of Bosnia and Herzegovina (1882–1886) ===
Following the pacification of Bosnia and Herzegovina following the 1878 occupation, Common Finance Minister Béni Kállay appointed Nikolić to the newly created office of Civil Adlatus (head of the civilian administration) under the military government of Hermann Freiherr Dahlen von Orlaburg on 1 August 1882.

Nikolić established his residence in Sarajevo at the former Austro-Hungarian consulate building (known locally as the "Nikolić House"), which became the central gathering point for high society. Leveraging his dynastic ties to the Serbian royal family, Nikolić fostered open social relations between Austro-Hungarian military and civil officials and the local Bosnian patriciate and elite.

For his administrative contributions, he was created an Imperial and Royal Privy Councillor (valóságos belső titkos tanácsos) on 15 July 1882, and was decorated with the 1st Class of the Order of the Iron Crown on 4 May 1884. In October 1882, King Milan I of Serbia bestowed upon him the Grand Cross of the Order of Takovo, reaffirming warm ties between the Obrenović dynasty and Austria-Hungary. Nikolić retired from his post in November 1886 due to family obligations, upon which Sarajevo and several other Bosnian cities conferred upon him honorary citizenship.

=== Church Commissioner and House of Magnates ===
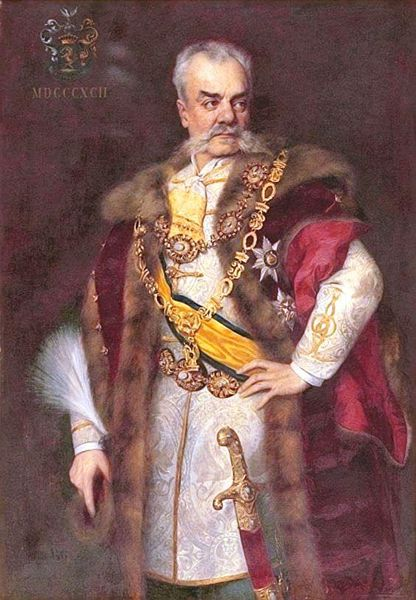
1892 Painting of Baron Fedor Nikolić

From 1886 to 1896 (winning unanimous re-election in 1887 and 1892), Nikolić served as Member of Parliament for Nagykikinda (Kikinda) as a supporter of the Liberal Party.

In 1890, he was appointed Royal Commissioner to the Serbian Orthodox Church Congress and Synod, a post he held until 1901. In this role, he mediated relations between the Hungarian state and the Orthodox hierarchy, working to preserve ecclesiastical autonomy and reduce ethnic tensions. On 6 May 1890, he laid the foundation stone for the new gymnasium and theological seminary in Sremski Karlovci.

Nikolić did not seek re-election to the House of Representatives in 1896, choosing instead to sit in the House of Magnates as an hereditary peer, where he served on both the Address and Financial committees. He was also granted the title of Főispán (Lord-Lieutenant).

== Business, civic, and philanthropic activities ==
Nikolić was one of the wealthiest landowners in the region, holding approximately 6,360 holds (iugăre) of land by the late 19th century, ranking second only to Lazar Dunđerski among ethnic Serbs in Hungary.

In autumn 1890, alongside Serbian Patriarch Georgije Branković and Dunđerski, he co-founded a credit bank in Novi Sad to provide low-interest loans to regional farmers and entrepreneurs.

Throughout his life, Nikolić was a prominent civic and corporate leader in the Banat region and Budapest:

- President of the Temesvár Agrar-Sparkassa (Agricultural Savings Bank) from its founding in 1869
- President of the Timișoara Lloyd Society (from 1878)
- President of the Ungarische Handels A.G. in Budapest
- President of the Military Service Insurance Institute (Militär-Dienst-Versicherungsanstalt)
- President of the Kikinda Steam Mill A.G. and the Temesvár Match Factory
- Board member of the First Hungarian General Insurance Company, the Hungarian Land Credit Institute, the Tisza Valley Society, and the Timiș–Bega Water Regulation Directorate

A staunch advocate for his native Temesvár, Nikolić championed the establishment of higher education institutions in the city, the regularization of the Bega River, and the construction of a navigational canal linking the Danube and Tisza rivers through Temesvár.

In November 1894, Nikolić and his brother Mihály donated a significant numismatic collection to the South Hungary Historical and Archaeological Museum Society (now the National Museum of Banat), consisting of 29 gold, 297 silver, and approximately 190 bronze coins. An avid horologist, Nikolić was also known for assembling one of Central Europe's finest private collections of antique watches.

== Personal life ==
On 18 May 1879, Nikolić married the opera singer Wilhelmina Hirsch. The couple had five children:

- Baroness Jeanne Nikolić de Rudna, who married Baron Géza Duka de Kádár, a diplomat of Aromanian descent and member of the House of Magnates
- Baron Fedor II Nikolić de Rudna, an attaché in the Austro-Hungarian Ministry of Foreign Affairs and universal heir to the baronial estate
- Countess Elisabeth Nikolić de Rudna, who married Count Eugen Hardegg, a lieutenant-colonel of hussars in the Austro-Hungarian Army
- János Nikolić de Rudna (died in infancy, 1877)
- Micheline Nikolić de Rudna (died in 1901)

== Illness and death ==
In early 1902, Nikolić suffered declining health due to heart complications, asthma, and severe rheumatism, seeking medical treatment in Vienna and Baden. He spent his final months bedridden at his estate in Rudna under the care of prominent physicians, including Professor Hawas from Budapest and Dr. Sternfeld from Temesvár.

Nikolić died at Rudna Castle on the evening of 27 February 1903 at the age of 66. Black mourning flags were flown across public institutions in Temesvár and throughout the village of Rudna. He was embalmed by legal medical examiner Dr. Heinrich Szigeti and laid in state in the Serbian Orthodox Church of Rudna.

His funeral took place on 4 March 1903, officiated by Lukijan Bogdanović, Serbian Orthodox Bishop of Buda and administrator of the Eparchy of Timișoara, assisted by Archimandrite Georgije Letić and 14 priests. Special trains were organized from Temesvár and Módos (Jaša Tomić) to transport mourners, with approximately 4,000 people attending the burial at the Nikolić family chapel in Rudna.

Condolences were extended by King Alexander I of Serbia, King Carol I of Romania, Archduke Franz Ferdinand of Austria, Archduke Ludwig Viktor of Austria, Hungarian Prime Minister Kálmán Széll, Speaker of the House Albert Apponyi, Count Agenor Maria Gołuchowski, and Patriarch Georgije Branković.

== Honours and awards ==
- (Austrian Empire) Austria-Hungary:
  - Imperial and Royal Privy Councillor (1882)
  - Knight 1st Class of the Order of the Iron Crown (1884)
- Kingdom of Serbia:
  - Grand Cross of the Order of Takovo (1882)
- Kingdom of Romania:
  - Grand Officer of the Order of the Star of Romania
- Honorary citizenship:
  - Honorary Citizen of Sarajevo (1886)
