= Șipet =

- village
- Interactive map of Șipet
- Coordinates: 45°24′N 21°24′E

Population (2002)
  - Total: 856
- Time zone: UTC+2 (EET)
  - Summer (DST): UTC+3 (EEST)
- Postal code: RO 307432

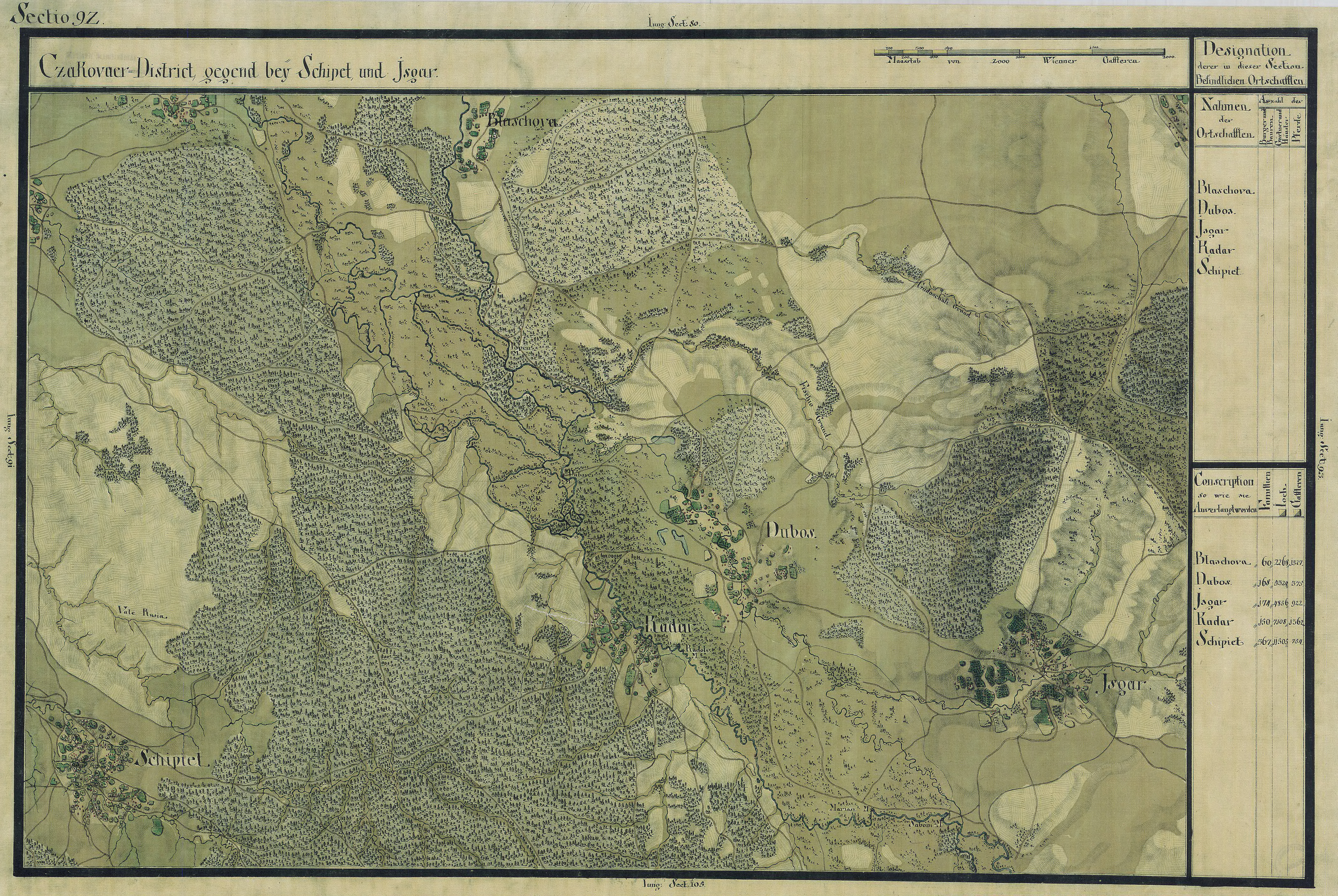
Map of Șipet (1769-1772)

Șipet is a village in Timiș County, in the Romanian part of Banat. Administratively it is one of the villages included in the commune of Tormac.

In 2002 the population of 856 people was ethnically split between Romanians (90%), Slovaks (7%), Magyars (<1%), Germans (<1%) and others (2%).

== History ==
The oldest surviving record of Șipet dates from 1462, when it was known as Magyarzebenth. In the period of Ottoman occupation it was one of the most populous settlements in Banat. Hungarian historians believe that the original inhabitants were Hungarians and Slovaks, but by the modern period the population was largely Romanian in terms of ethnicity.

By the time of the 1717 census the place is recorded as Schipeth. Early in the nineteenth century Șipet came into the hands of the Duca family when it was awarded to Field Marshal Petre Duca (1755–1822) because of his success in the wars against Napoleon. In 1873 a cholera epidemic led to the halving of the population. During the period of Hungarian rule Șipet was known and is documented as Sebed.

With financial support from Vasile Stroiescu a church (Orthodox) school was built. The foundation stone of a new church was laid on 25 August 1935 on the presence of Bishop Vasile Lăzărescu.

== Sources and further reading ==
- Ioan Lotreanu, Monografia Banatului, Institutul de Arte Grafice „Țara”, Timișoara, 1935
- Remus Crețan, Dicționar toponimic și geografico-istoric al localităților din județul Timiș, Editura Universității de Vest, Timișoara, 2006 ISBN 973-7608-65-8
