= Delinești mine =

Manganese mine in Romania

- Location within Romania

Location
- Location: Păltiniș, Caraș-Severin County, Romania; 45°23′17.12″N 22°4′21.86″E

Production
- Products: Manganese
- Production: 20,000 tonnes

Owner
- Company: Minbucovina

The Delinești mine is a large mine in the west of Romania in Caraș-Severin County, 38 km east of Reșița and 448 km west of the capital, Bucharest. Delinești represents one of the largest manganese reserve in Romania having estimated reserves of 7.5 million tonnes of manganese ore grading 20% manganese metal.
