= Order of the Holy Sepulchre (Orthodox) =

Orthodox order of knighthood

- Τάγμα Ορθοδόξων Σταυροφόρων του Παναγίου Τάφου; Ordre du Saint-Sépulcre orthodoxe
- Formation: 1925
- Founded at: Greek Orthodox Patriarchate of Jerusalem, Church of the Holy Sepulchre
- Purpose: Support the Greek Orthodox Christian presence in the Holy Land
- Headquarters: Greek Orthodox Patriarchate of Jerusalem
- Awards: Supreme Taxiarch; Knight Grand Cross; Commander
- Website: jerusalem-patriarchate.info

The Greek Orthodox Patriarchate of Jerusalem is the patron of the Greek Orthodox "Equestrian Order of the Holy Sepulchre" (Greek: Τάγμα Ορθοδόξων Σταυροφόρων του Παναγίου Τάφου, lit. 'Orthodox Order of the Cross-Bearers of the Holy Sepulchre'), distinct from the Catholic order of the same name (Latin: Ordo Equestris Sancti Sepulcri Hierosolymitani, OESSH).

The Greek Orthodox Patriarch confers the title of Supreme Taxiarch to particularly appreciated personalities, be it Greek diplomats, military officers and Greek Orthodox clerics, or non-Greeks such as the Metropolitan of Ekaterinburg in Russia, then-Russian Prime Minister Dmitry Medvedev, or then-Franciscan Custos of the Holy Land, Pierbattista Pizzaballa. US First Lady Jacqueline Kennedy received the Grand Cross in 1961.

Bilingual (Greek and French) diplomas accompanying the insignia presented to those awarded membership are known since at least 1925, and are inscribed in French with the heading "Ordre du Saint-Sépulcre orthodoxe", lit. "Orthodox Order of the Holy Sepulchre", which is a not quite complete translation of the Greek name of the Order. The Greek winner of a gold medal at the art competitions at the 1924 Summer Olympics, Costas Dimitriadis, was awarded the title of Commander ("Commandeur de l'Ordre du Saint-Sépulcre orthodoxe") on 25 March 1925.

== See also ==
- Brotherhood of the Holy Sepulchre
- Greek Orthodox Church
- Order of the Holy Sepulchre (Catholic)
