= Ezeriș =

- Commune
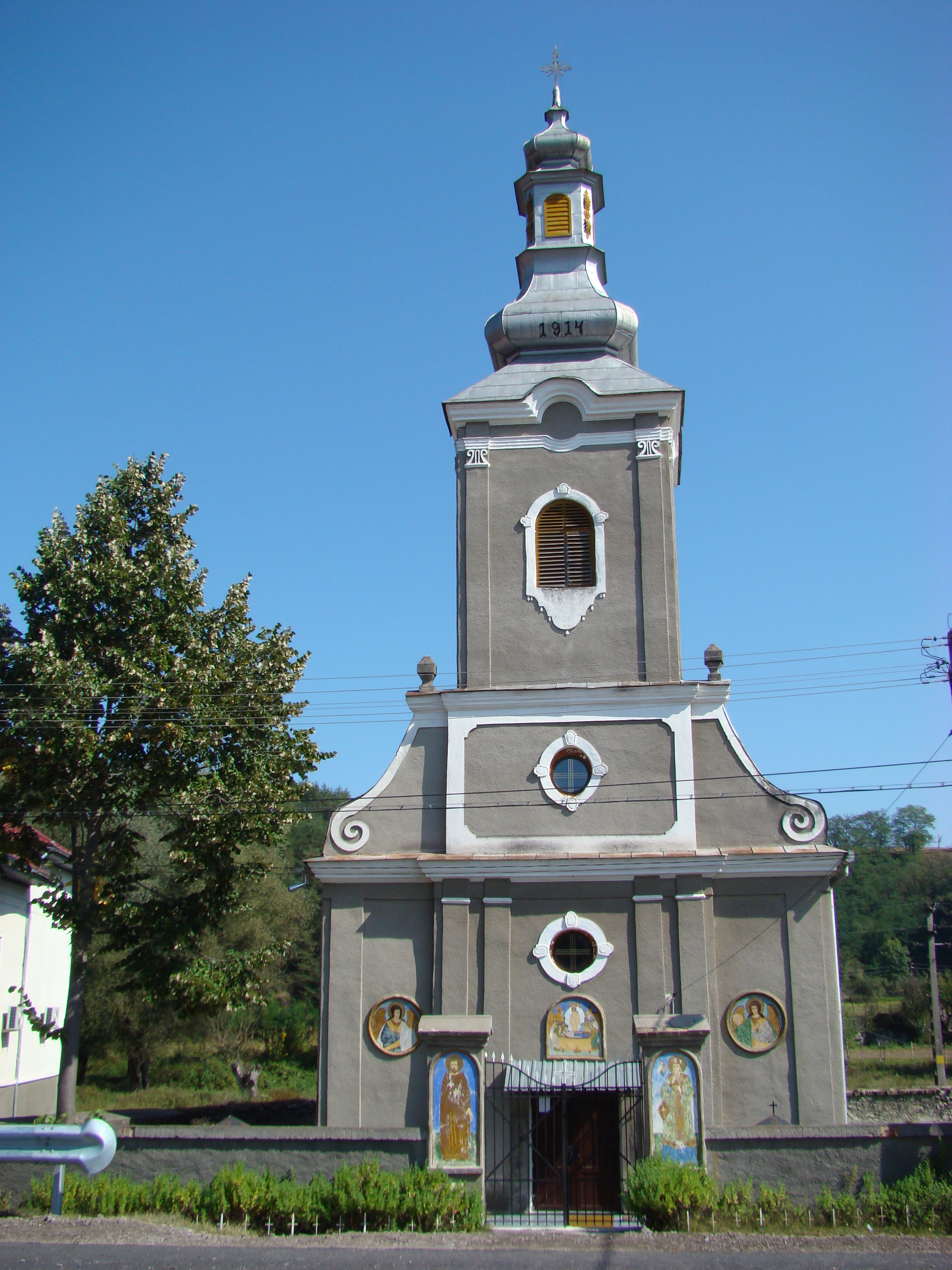
- Romanian Orthodox church in Ezeriș

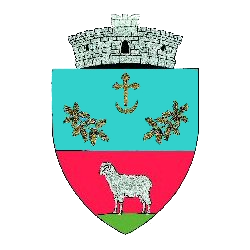
- Coat of arms

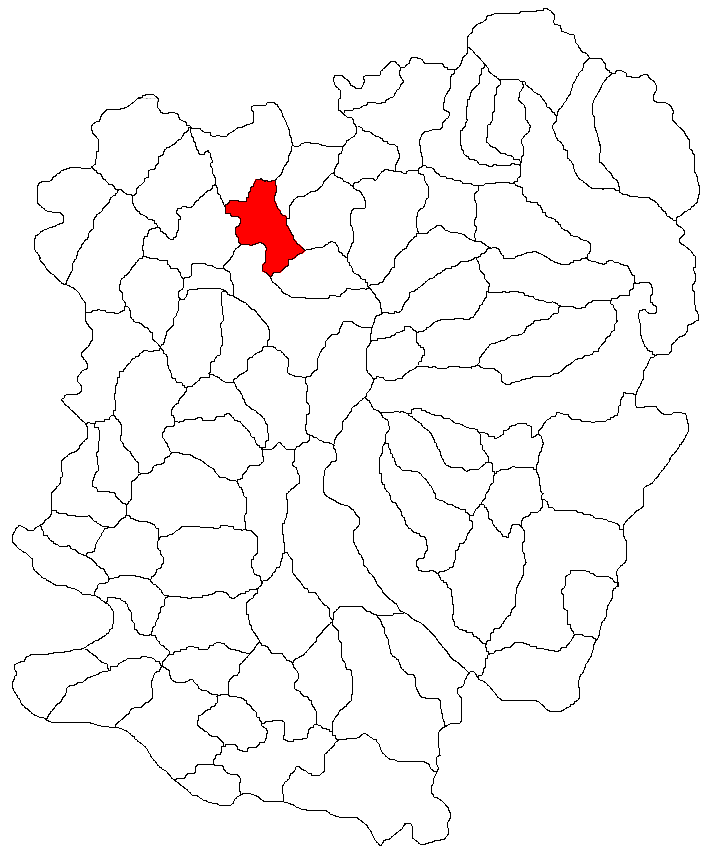
- Location in Caraș-Severin County

- Location in Romania
- Coordinates: 45°25′N 21°53′E
- Country: Romania
- County: Caraș-Severin

Government
  - Mayor (2020–2024): Ioan Rusu (PNL)
- Area: 78.23 km^{2} (30.20 sq mi)
- Elevation: 219 m (719 ft)
- Population (2021-12-01): 1,505
  - Density: 19.24/km^{2} (49.83/sq mi)
- Time zone: UTC+02:00 (EET)
  - Summer (DST): UTC+03:00 (EEST)
- Postal code: 327195
- Area code: +(40) 255
- Vehicle reg.: CS
- Website: primariaezeris.ro

Ezeriș (Hungarian: Ezeres) is a commune in Caraș-Severin County, western Romania with a population of 1,505 people as of 2021. It is composed of two villages, Ezeriș and Soceni (Szocsán).

The commune is home to the football club Progresul Ezeriș.

Historical population
Year	Pop.	±%
1880	2,693	—
1910	2,733	+1.5%
1930	2,309	−15.5%
1977	1,983	−14.1%
2002	1,410	−28.9%
2011	1,255	−11.0%
2021	1,505	+19.9%
Source: Census data
