= Darova =

- Commune
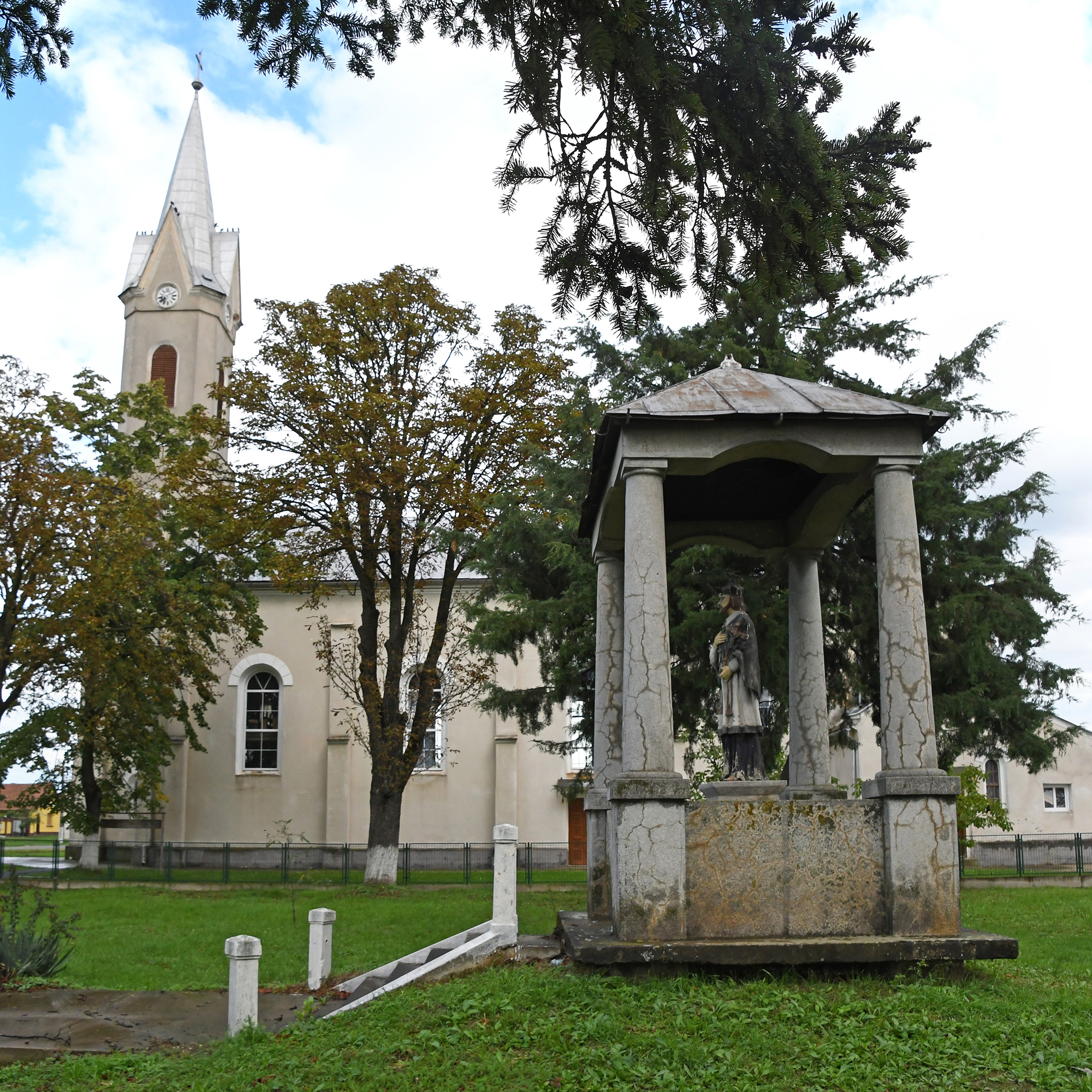
- The Roman Catholic church with the statue of John of Nepomuk

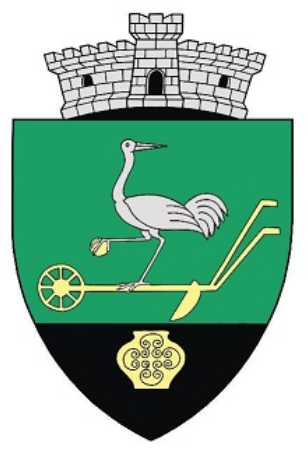
- Coat of arms

- Location in Timiș County

- Location in Romania
- Coordinates: 45°38′17″N 21°46′00″E
- Country: Romania
- County: Timiș
- Established: 1786
- Subdivisions: Darova, Hodoș, Sacoșu Mare

Government
  - Mayor (2024–): Viorel-Aurel Cherciu (PSD)
- Area: 104.59 km^{2} (40.38 sq mi)
- Population (2021-12-01): 3,074
  - Density: 29.39/km^{2} (76.12/sq mi)
- Time zone: UTC+02:00 (EET)
  - Summer (DST): UTC+03:00 (EEST)
- Postal code: 307140–307142
- Vehicle reg.: TM
- Website: primariadarova.ro

Darova (German: Kranichstätten or Darowa; Hungarian: Daruvár) is a commune in Timiș County, Romania. It is composed of three villages: Darova (commune seat), Hodoș and Sacoșu Mare. Ștefănești existed as a separate hamlet from 1885 to 1930, when it was merged into Darova, with Darova Nouă similarly absorbed in 1956.

== History ==
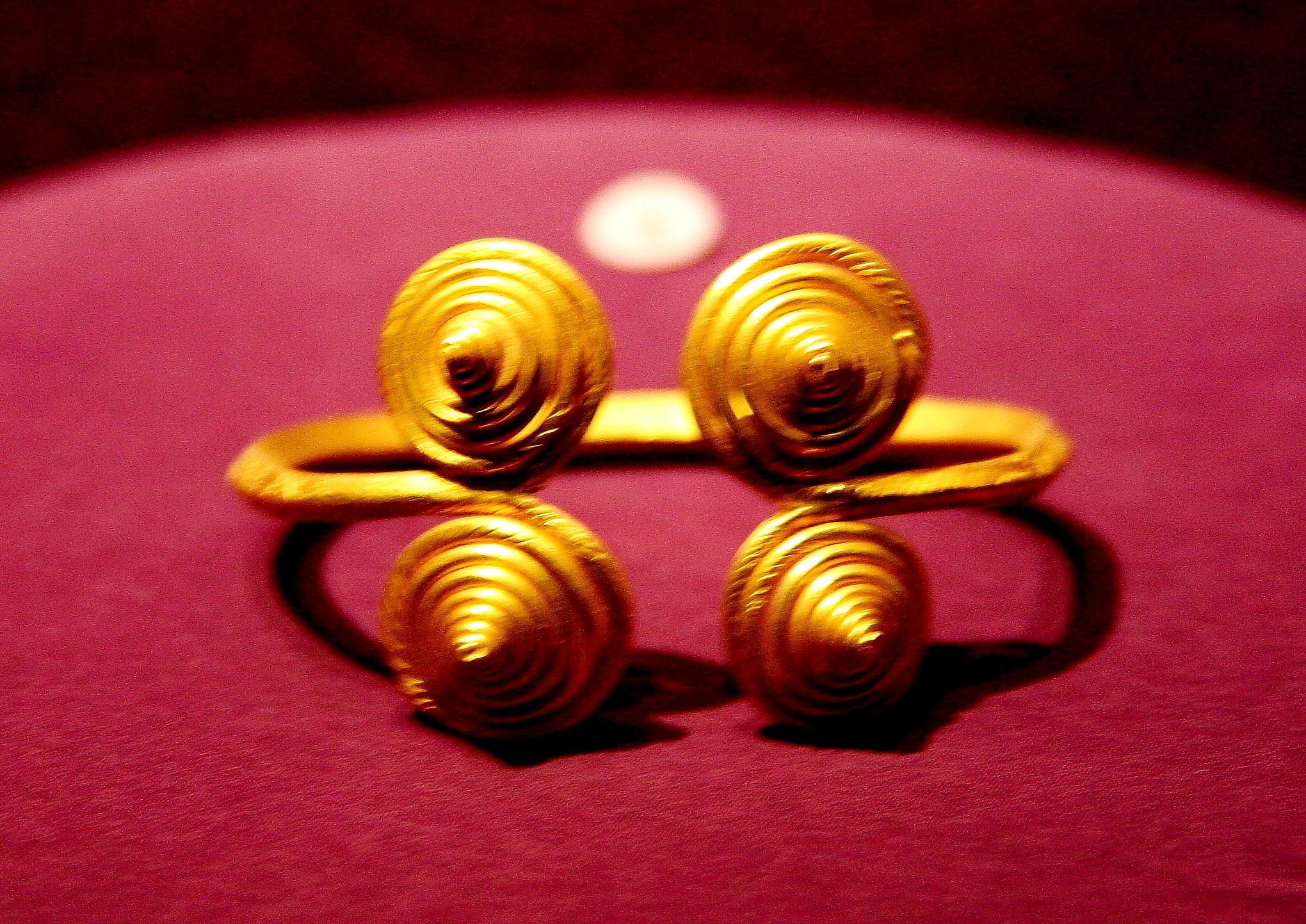
Bracelets of Sacoșu Mare treasure on display at the National History Museum of Romania

In the autumn of 1960, in the Sacoșu Mare area, a local resident accidentally unearthed an Iron Age hoard, attributed to the Hallstatt period (the First Iron Age) and contemporaneous with the presence of the Dacians on the territory of present-day Romania. The hoard comprises 25 gold ingots, jewelry, and wire-ingots, and is currently housed at the National Museum of History in Bucharest.

Darova was founded in 1786 by 57 families of German settlers from Silesia and Württemberg. It happened during the third wave of colonizations in Banat, under the reign of Emperor Joseph II. The name was given in honor of the government commissioner of Temes County, Count Johann Jankovits von Daruwar. Only two years after its founding, in the autumn of 1788, Darova was invaded by the Turks. Most of the younger settlers fled Darova and only a few returned after the Turks were driven out. In 1791, some of the German inhabitants of the village of Tormac settled in Darova.

In 1885, on the northern edge of the village hearth, a new settlement was established, Istvánfalva (Ștefănești) or Darova Mică, where 72 families from Novo Selo, Torontál County, Serbian Banat were colonized. Historian Remus Crețan claims that this locality was Romanian. Many of these colonists left and were replaced by people from different localities in the area. Until 1930 Darova Mică was independent, after which it was incorporated into present-day Darova, being a neighborhood of it.

Population movements continued in the years that followed. In 1892, Lutheran Slovaks from Békéscsaba and Nyitra were brought to David Kuhner's estate. On this occasion, a new short-lived hamlet was set up, called Imrefalva. In 1906 the hamlet was abolished and the Slovaks were assimilated to the Germans. In 1954 there was another hamlet, this time Romanian, called Darova Nouă. It was, however, absorbed by Darova.

== Demographics ==
Ethnic composition (2021)
1. Romanians (89.7%)
2. Unknown (9.72%)
3. Others (0.56%)
Religious composition (2021)
1. Orthodox (72.4%)
2. Pentecostals (9.79%)
3. Baptists (2.60%)
4. Adventists (1.62%)
5. Plymouth Brethren (1.10%)
6. Unknown (9.95%)
7. Others (2.37%)
8. Irreligious, atheists and agnostics (0.16%)

Darova had a population of 3,074 inhabitants at the 2021 census, up 0.82% from the 2011 census. Most inhabitants are Romanians (89.72%). For 9.72% of the population, ethnicity is unknown. By religion, most inhabitants are Orthodox (72.41%), but there are also minorities of Pentecostals (9.79%), Baptists (2.6%), Adventists (1.62%) and Plymouth Brethren (1.1%). For 9.95% of the population, religious affiliation is unknown.

Census		Ethnic composition
Year	Population	Romanians	Hungarians	Germans	Ukrainians
1880	4,977	3,470	108	1,329	–
1890	5,338	3,517	80	1,690	–
1900	5,759	3,642	205	1,838	–
1910	5,898	3,887	68	1,930	–
1920	5,614	3,630	15	1,897	–
1930	5,230	3,263	39	1,911	–
1941	5,157	3,174	20	1,932	–
1956	4,567	2,721	8	1,835	–
1966	4,221	2,485	13	1,720	–
1977	3,791	2,191	9	1,584	–
1992	3,031	2,763	20	213	204
2002	3,208	2,800	31	12	350
2011	3,049	2,574	6	7	329
2021	3,074	2,758	3	–	11

== Politics and administration ==
The commune of Darova is administered by a mayor and a local council composed of 13 councilors. The mayor, Viorel-Aurel Cherciu, from the Social Democratic Party, has been in office since 2024. As from the 2024 local elections, the local council has the following composition by political parties:

Party	Seats	Composition
Social Democratic Party	5	
Save Romania Union–People's Movement Party–Force of the Right	3	
National Liberal Party	2	
Alliance for the Union of Romanians	1	
Renewing Romania's European Project	1	
Ind.	1	

== Notable people ==
- Pavel Roșu (1931–1999), Banat folk music soloist and instrumentalist
- Gheorghe Luchescu (1937–2011), literary historian
- Zeno Maghețiu (1940–2022), philologist, sociologist, actor and director of the Lugoj Municipal Library
