= Sacoșu Turcesc =

- Commune
- Location in Timiș County

- Location in Romania
- Coordinates: 45°39′N 21°26′E
- Country: Romania
- County: Timiș

Government
  - Mayor (2024–): Iulian-Petru Brocia (PSD)
- Area: 124.53 km^{2} (48.08 sq mi)
- Population (2021-12-01): 3,392
  - Density: 27.24/km^{2} (70.55/sq mi)
- Time zone: UTC+02:00 (EET)
  - Summer (DST): UTC+03:00 (EEST)
- Postal code: 307355–307362
- Vehicle reg.: TM
- Website: primariasacos.ro

Sacoșu Turcesc (Hungarian: Törökszákos; German: Türkisch Sakosch; Serbian: Турски Сакош, romanized: Turski Sakoš) is a commune in Timiș County, Romania. It is composed of seven villages: Berini, Icloda, Otvești, Sacoșu Turcesc (commune seat), Stamora Română, Uliuc and Unip.

== History ==
The first recorded mention of Sacoșu Turcesc dates from 1321, when, in a Hungarian noble diploma, the village of Zekes, belonging to Szörény County, is mentioned. Also here is attested from 1440 a castle, which belonged to the Hungarian noble family Kórógyi. In 1459 the castle came into the possession of the Hungarian king Matthias Corvinus, and then he ceded it to the Hungarian noble family Kanizsai. In 1473 the castle was owned by Ioan Ungur of Nădăștia and the Szobi family. From 1507, the ownership of the castle is taken over by István Werbőczy.

The word Turcesc ("Turkish") in the name of the locality does not indicate, as it seemed at first sight, the ethnicity of the villagers, but the Ottoman suzerainty under which the locality was at one time. This is to distinguish it from Sacoșu Mare, which was also called Sacoșu Unguresc, because it was in the part of Banat attached to Transylvania during the time of Temeşvar Eyalet.

The Franciscan monastery here, founded by King Charles Robert in 1366, was destroyed during the Ottoman occupation.

== Demographics ==
Ethnic composition (2021)
1. Romanians (75.2%)
2. Roma (7.45%)
3. Hungarians (4.80%)
4. Unknown (12.2%)
5. Others (0.35%)
Religious composition (2021)
1. Orthodox (74.5%)
2. Roman Catholics (4.68%)
3. Pentecostals (2.18%)
4. Baptists (2.03%)
5. Reformed (1.26%)
6. Unknown (13.3%)
7. Others (1.54%)
8. Irreligious, atheists and agnostics (0.47%)

Sacoșu Turcesc had a population of 3,392 inhabitants at the 2021 census, up 2.57% from the 2011 census. Most inhabitants are Romanians (75.23%), larger minorities being represented by Roma (7.45%) and Hungarians (4.8%). For 12.17% of the population, ethnicity is unknown. By religion, most inhabitants are Orthodox (74.49%), but there are also minorities of Roman Catholics (4.68%), Pentecostals (2.18%), Baptists (2.03%) and Reformed (1.26%). For 13.35% of the population, religious affiliation is unknown.

Census		Ethnic composition
Year	Population	Romanians	Hungarians	Germans	Roma	Serbs
1880	5,301	4,675	451	148	–	13
1890	6,003	5,106	675	186	–	21
1900	6,611	5,437	872	240	–	40
1910	6,739	5,331	1,131	191	–	24
1920	5,832	4,838	763	166	–	–
1930	5,771	4,859	676	158	38	12
1941	5,554	4,607	637	174	–	–
1956	5,229	4,424	615	88	76	6
1966	4,781	4,040	455	47	37	191
1977	4,658	3,984	436	44	185	–
1992	3,037	2,626	230	30	144	2
2002	3,156	2,686	215	21	223	2
2011	3,307	2,632	242	12	163	–
2021	3,392	2,552	163	3	253	–

== Politics and administration ==
The commune of Sacoșu Turcesc is administered by a mayor and a local council composed of 13 councilors. The mayor, Iulian-Petru Brocia, from the Social Democratic Party, has been in office since 2024. As from the 2024 local elections, the local council has the following composition by political parties:

Party	Seats	Composition
Social Democratic Party	7	
National Liberal Party–Social Liberal Humanist Party	3	
Alliance for the Union of Romanians	2	
Save Romania Union–People's Movement Party–Force of the Right	1	
