= Păltiniș, Caraș-Severin =

Păltiniș Пелтініш
- Commune
- Coat of arms

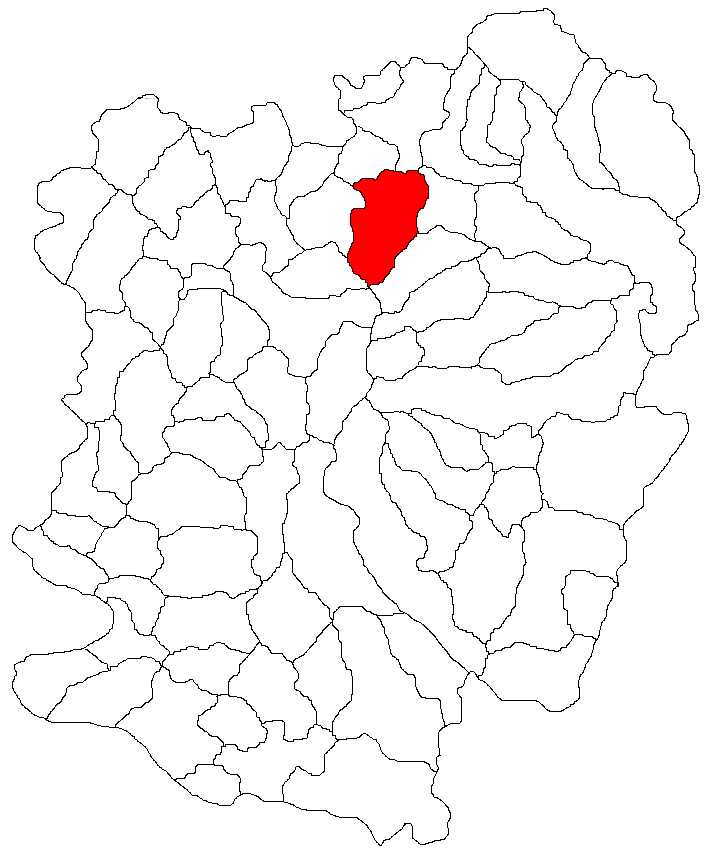
- Location in Caraș-Severin County

- Location in Romania
- Coordinates: 45°26′N 22°9′E
- Country: Romania
- County: Caraș-Severin

Government
  - Mayor (2024–2028): Ioan Popovici (PSD)
- Area: 99.97 km^{2} (38.60 sq mi)
- Elevation: 266 m (873 ft)
- Population (2021-12-01): 2,145
  - Density: 21.46/km^{2} (55.57/sq mi)
- Time zone: UTC+02:00 (EET)
  - Summer (DST): UTC+03:00 (EEST)
- Postal code: 327295
- Area code: +(40) 0255
- Vehicle reg.: CS
- Website: www.primariapaltiniscs.ro

Păltiniș (until 1960 Valea Boului) is a commune in Caraș-Severin County, western Romania with a population of 2,145 as of 2021. It is composed of five villages: Cornuțel, Delinești, Ohabița, Păltiniș, and Rugi. It is located in the historical region of Banat.

The earliest surviving mention of Păltiniș is in a document of 1585. The Roman fort of Caput Bubali is located in present-day Delinești village.

In Romanian	In Hungarian	In Ukrainian
Cornuțel		Корнуцел
Delinești	Delényes	Делінешть
Ohabița	Kisszabadi	Охебіца
Păltiniș	Ökörpatak	Пелтініш
Rugi	Ruzs	Руджі

== Demographics ==
Historical population
Year	Pop.	±%
1880	3,000	—
1910	3,321	+10.7%
1930	2,878	−13.3%
1977	3,460	+20.2%
2002	2,683	−22.5%
2011	2,408	−10.2%
2021	2,145	−10.9%
Source: Census data

At the 2021 census, the commune had 2,145 inhabitants; of those, 70.72% were Romanians and 22.38% Ukrainians.

== Landmarks ==
The Town Hall is in Păltiniș village, which is about 4.5 km (2.8 mi) away from the town of Caransebeș and about 40 km (25 mi) away from Reșița. Păltiniș has also a medical centre, veterinary centre, and a school which has pupils from the 1st to the 8th grade. The Delinești mine is also located in the commune.
