= Tormac =

Tormac Végvár
- Commune
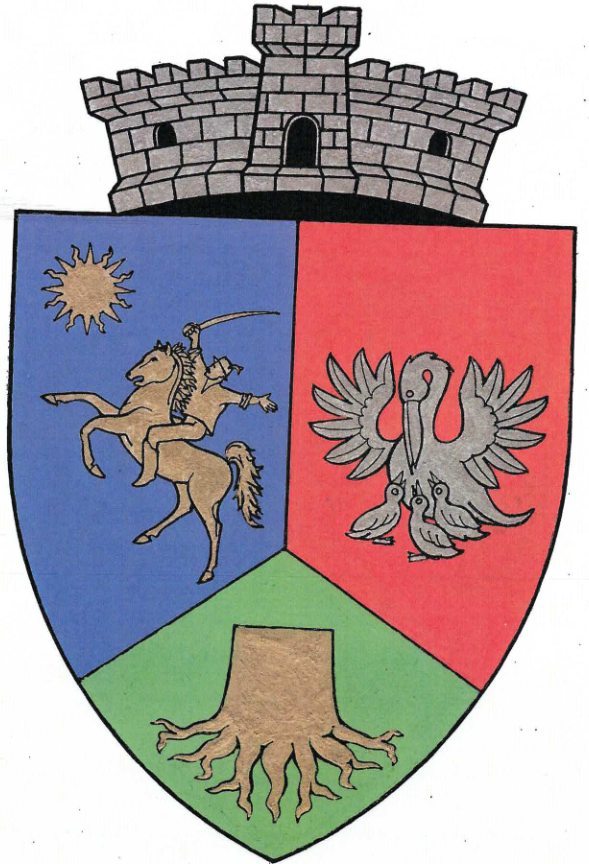
- Coat of arms

- Location in Timiș County

- Location in Romania
- Coordinates: 45°31′N 21°30′E
- Country: Romania
- County: Timiș
- Established: 1780 (Rittberg)

Government
  - Mayor (2024–): Dănuț-Gruia Pop (PNL)
- Area: 121.03 km^{2} (46.73 sq mi)
- Elevation: 135 m (443 ft)
- Population (2021-12-01): 2,852
  - Density: 23.56/km^{2} (61.03/sq mi)
- Time zone: UTC+02:00 (EET)
  - Summer (DST): UTC+03:00 (EEST)
- Postal code: 307430–307432
- Vehicle reg.: TM
- Website: tormac.ro

Tormac (Hungarian: Végvár; German: Rittberg) is a commune in Timiș County, Romania. It is composed of three villages: Cadăr, Șipet and Tormac (commune seat).

== Geography ==
Tormac is located in the southeast of Timiș County. It borders Nițchidorf and Sacoșu Turcesc to the north, Gătaia to the south, Voiteg and Liebling to the west and Caraș-Severin County to the east. Morphologically, the territory of the commune falls within the sub-hilly plain of Șipet and the Pogonici Plain.

The hydrology of the area is dominated at the northern limit by the Pogonici River, the only tributary of the Timiș River that never dries. Due to a lack of unevenness separating the meadows from the interfluves, during the spring freshets, the river floods the areas along the valley.

The location of the commune in the middle of a plain ensures a continental climate, influenced by warm Mediterranean air currents. The average annual temperature is 10.6 °C (51.1 °F).

== History ==
Like many other surrounding settlements, Tormac was established in 1780, in the third wave of colonization of Banat, by Germans (Swabians). At first it was called Rittberg, after an Austrian general. The village did not manage to become Germanized because around 1790 German families were forced to leave their homes and settle in neighboring villages, such as Bacova or Darova.

Thus, between 1790–1794, the place of the Germans was taken by 78 families of Hungarian settlers, so that the village can be considered one of the first Reformed Hungarian colonies in Banat. They came from Csanád, Csongrád, Békés and Heves counties. The story goes that when the first Hungarians arrived, they found the village completely lit by candles left by the Germans in their homes.

Due to the complete transformation of the village into a Hungarian community, in 1806 the communal council decided to change its name from Rittberg to Végvár. Being surrounded by Romanian villages, during the revolution of 1848, bloody conflicts arose between the Hungarians from Tormac and the Romanians from Șipet, Berini, Cadăr or Sacoș. After this moment, the waters calmed down and Tormac developed and became one of the largest and most compact Hungarian communes in Banat.

== Demographics ==
Ethnic composition (2021)
1. Romanians (61.1%)
2. Hungarians (31.6%)
3. Unknown (5.22%)
4. Others (2.09%)
Religious composition (2021)
1. Orthodox (56.8%)
2. Reformed (26.9%)
3. Roman Catholics (5.11%)
4. Pentecostals (3.57%)
5. Unknown (5.39%)
6. Others (2.11%)
7. Irreligious, atheists and agnostics (0.17%)

Tormac had a population of 2,852 inhabitants at the 2021 census, up 5.08% from the 2011 census. Most inhabitants are Romanians (61.07%), with a minority of Hungarians (31.62%). For 5.22% of the population, ethnicity is unknown. By religion, most inhabitants are Orthodox (56.76%), but there are also minorities of Reformed (26.89%), Roman Catholics (5.11%) and Pentecostals (3.57%). For 5.39% of the population, religious affiliation is unknown.

Census		Ethnic composition
Year	Population	Romanians	Hungarians	Germans	Roma	Slovaks
1880	4,906	2,520	2,169	177	–	7
1890	5,660	2,787	2,637	128	–	46
1900	6,112	3,104	2,650	290	–	10
1910	6,227	2,947	2,812	360	–	24
1920	5,599	2,597	2,580	340	–	–
1930	5,438	2,720	2,387	252	54	12
1941	5,378	2,652	2,341	302	–	–
1956	4,634	2,319	2,173	113	25	2
1966	4,160	2,120	1,925	77	27	3
1977	3,515	1,777	1,612	39	48	24
1992	2,705	1,388	1,221	16	14	54
2002	2,737	1,480	1,158	8	13	63
2011	2,714	1,547	973	7	7	32
2021	2,852	1,742	902	4	20	23

== Politics and administration ==
The commune of Tormac is administered by a mayor and a local council composed of 11 councilors. The mayor, Dănuț-Gruia Pop, from the National Liberal Party, has been in office since 2024. As from the 2024 local elections, the local council has the following composition by political parties:

Party	Seats	Composition
National Liberal Party	4	
Democratic Alliance of Hungarians in Romania	3	
Social Democratic Party	2	
S.O.S. Romania	2	

== Notable people ==
- Géza Duka de Kádár (1867–1913), diplomat, politician and landowner
- Alexandru Jebeleanu (1923–1996), poet
- János Graur (b. 1938), editor and journalist
- István Eszteró (b. 1941), poet
