= Brebu, Caraș-Severin =

Brebu
- Commune
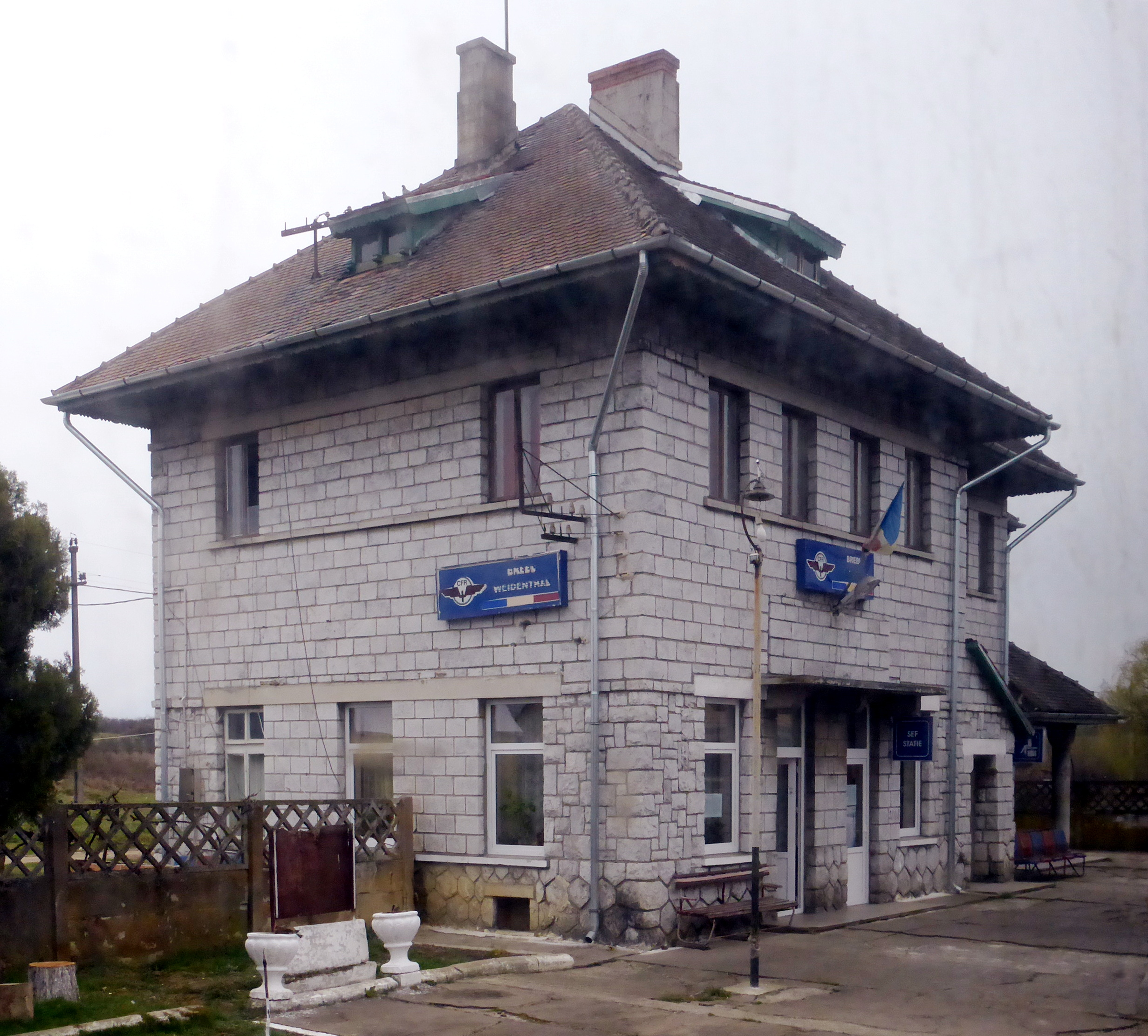
- Brebu train station

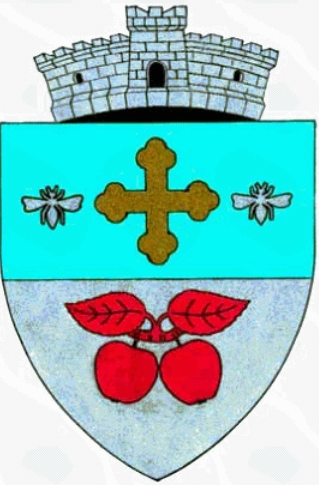
- Coat of arms

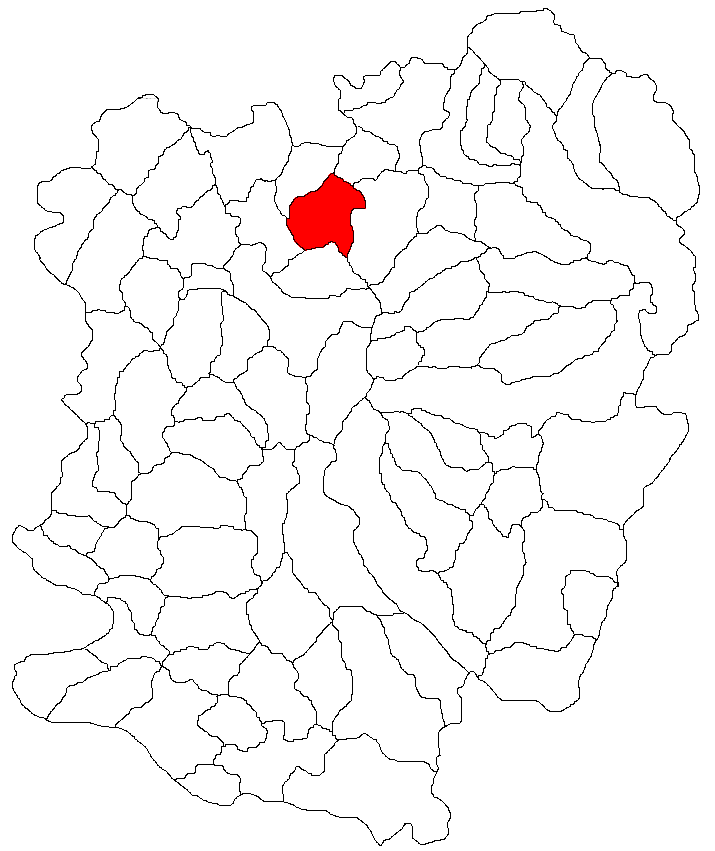
- Location in Caraș-Severin County

- Location in Romania
- Coordinates: 45°25′13″N 21°59′33″E
- Country: Romania
- County: Caraș-Severin

Government
  - Mayor (2024–2028): Ion Țicheriu (PSD)
- Area: 76.89 km^{2} (29.69 sq mi)
- Elevation: 210 m (690 ft)
- Population (2021-12-01): 999
  - Density: 13.0/km^{2} (33.7/sq mi)
- Time zone: UTC+02:00 (EET)
  - Summer (DST): UTC+03:00 (EEST)
- Postal code: 327045
- Area code: +(40) x55
- Vehicle reg.: CS
- Website: primaria-brebu.ro

Brebu (Hungarian: Perlő) is a commune in Caraș-Severin County, Banat, western Romania with a population of 999 people as of 2021. It is composed of three villages: Apadia (Apádia), Brebu, and Valeadeni (Váldény).

Historical population
Year	Pop.	±%
1880	2,840	—
1910	3,338	+17.5%
1930	3,166	−5.2%
1977	2,449	−22.6%
2002	1,340	−45.3%
2011	1,164	−13.1%
2021	999	−14.2%
Source: Census data
