= Klisura =

Klisura, a South Slavic word of Greek origin (kleisoúra), for "pass", "gorge" or "canyon", may refer to:

== Albania ==
- Këlcyrë, a Byzantine town, now in Albania

== Bosnia and Herzegovina ==
- Klisura (Višegrad), a village in the municipality of Višegrad
- Klisura, Fojnica, a village in the municipality of Fojnica

== Bulgaria ==
- Klisura, Blagoevgrad Province, a village
- Klisura, Plovdiv Province, a town
- Klisura, Sofia City Province, a village in Bankya District, Sofia City Province
- Klisura, Sofia Province, a village in Samokov Municipality, Sofia Province
- Klisurski Monastery, a Bulgarian Orthodox monastery

== North Macedonia ==
- Klisura, North Macedonia, a village in Demir Kapija Municipality

== Serbia ==
- Klisura (Doljevac), Nišava
- Klisura (Bela Palanka), Pirot
- Klisura (Surdulica), Pčinja District
- Klisura Monastery (Serbia), a Serbian Orthodox monastery

== People ==
- Sara Klisura (born 1992), Serbian professional volleyball player

== See also ==
- Clisura Dunării, Romania
- Kleisoura (disambiguation)
