= Bazjaš monastery =

Serbian Orthodox monastery in Socol, Romania

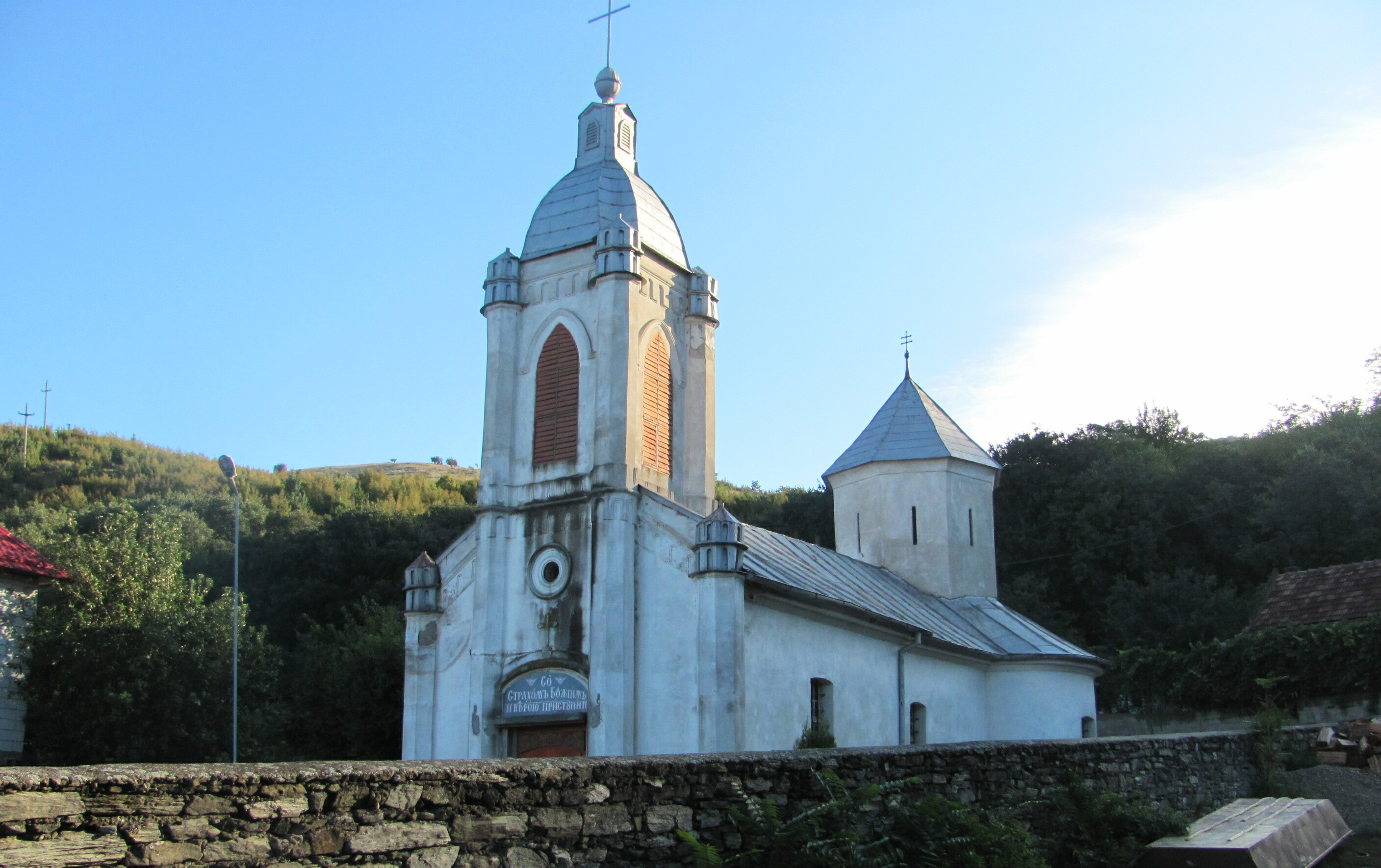

Religion
- Affiliation: Serbian Orthodox Church

Location
- Location: Baziaș, Caraș-Severin County, Romania
- Interactive map of Bazjaš monastery
- Coordinates: 44.816150°N 21.390040°E

Architecture
- Groundbreaking: 1225

The Bazjaš or Baziaș monastery (Serbian: Манастир Базјаш, Romanian: Mănăstirea Baziaș) is a medieval Serbian Orthodox monastery located in the Baziaș village, Socol Commune, Caraș-Severin County, Romania. It was established in 1225. The monastery lies in the Clisura Dunării-region.

== Gallery ==
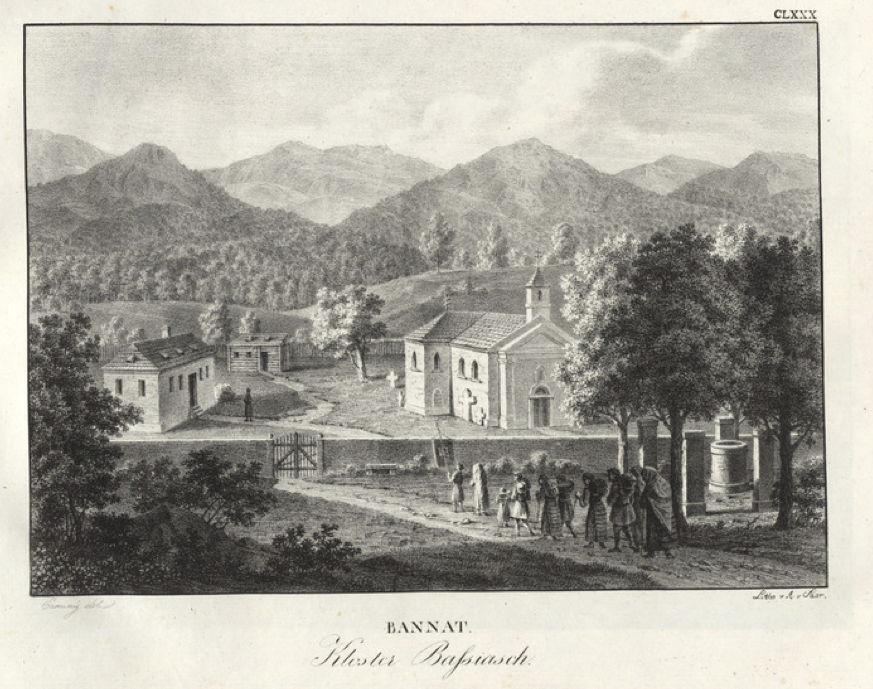
Monastery in 1826

== See also ==
- List of Serbian Orthodox monasteries
- Eparchy of Timișoara
- Serbs of Romania
