= Union of Serbs of Romania =

Тhе Union of Serbs in Romania Uniunea Sârbilor din România Савез Срба у Румунији
- President: Ognean Crîstici
- Chamber leader: Ognean Crîstici
- Founded: 29 December 1989
- Headquarters: Mangalia 29, Timișoara
- Ideology: Serb minority interests
- Political position: Centre
- National affiliation: National Minorities Parliamentary Group

Website
- savezsrba.ro/cir/

The Union of Serbs in Romania (Serbian: Савез Срба у Румунији, SSR; Romanian: Uniunea Sârbilor din România, USR) is "a public and apolitical association with a social, cultural-artistic, literary and educational character, having legal personality" (according to the Statute), and which represents the Serbian minority in Romania. Its president and deputy is Ognean Crîstici/ Ognjan Krstić, who is also part of the group of national minorities in the Chamber of Deputies of the Romanian Parliament.

== History ==
The founding meeting of the Democratic Front of Serbs and Croats in Romania took place on 27 December 1989 in Timișoara. The founding meeting was held on 29 December 1989, on which occasion the organization was established under the name Democratic Union of Serbs in Romania. The founding general assembly of 19 February 1990 approved the Statute of the Union and elected the leadership. The Timișoara Court validated the UDSR as a legal entity on 26 February 1990. In 1992 the organization was renamed the Democratic Union of Serbs and Croats in Romania. At the general assembly of the Union on 12 April 1997 it was decided to change the name to Union of Serbs in Romania. It has approximately 30 local branches and approximately 5,500 active members. It represents the Serbian minority; at the 2021 Romanian census, there were 18,524 ethnic Serbs throughout Romania, concentrated mainly in the counties of Timiș, Caraș-Severin, Arad and Mehedinți

== Activities ==
=== Culture ===
USR annually organizes, among others, the traditional "Saint Sava Ball" (in January), a "Marathon" of Serbian dance and song, a choral festival of church music, the "Days of Serbian Culture" (in November)...

=== Folk groups ===
USR supports and sponsors almost 30 groups and ensembles in Romania, of which the most significant are the Academic Ensemble „Mladost" Timișoara, the Timișoara Tambura School, the „Thalia" Timișoara Theater Studio, the Serbian Orthodox Cathedral Choir in Timișoara, the „Kruna" Ensemble, Sînmartinu Sârbesc, etc.

=== USR Publishing House ===
The Publishing House of the Union of Serbs in Romania was founded in May 1994. Annually, USR publishes around twenty book titles, being also the publisher of the following publications: Naša reč (the only weekly of Serbs in Romania), Književni život (literary magazine, published biannually), Novi temišvarski vesnik (magazine, published biannually) and Banatski almanac (calendar-almanac, published biannually/annually).

In addition to regular publications, by the end of 2019. USR Publishing House has published 70 volumes of poetry and prose, 92 monographs, 33 anthologies, 23 volumes of essays and journalism, 16 children's books, 27 translations, 9 volumes "from our treasure trove", 6 dictionaries, 10 calendars-almanacs, 32 books in the field of scientific literature and 2 phototype editions.

=== Library Dimitrije Tirol ===
The Library of the Union of Serbs in Romania is a specialized library, aiming to ensure the conditions for reading books and periodicals in the Serbian language, the main target audience being the Serbian community in Timișoara. Established in 1992, the Library operated for a long time in Union Square in Timișoara. In 2018, the Library's headquarters were moved to a more suitable space at the Serbian Cultural Center in Timișoara (headquarters of the Union of Serbs in Romania, 29 Mangalia Street). At the inauguration, it was named after the writer and bibliophile "Dimitrije P. Tirol", who printed one of the first Serbian calendars-almanacs, Banatskij almanach, in 1827, in Timișoara. The library's book collection today has over 19,000 volumes, as well as numerous collections of periodicals. The collection is constantly growing. The library is not addressed exclusively to the Serbian community, but to all those who wish to know or deepen the Serbian language and culture.

=== Schools ===
USR provides assistance to local authorities and supports the operation of Serbian language schools (especially the Dositej Obradović High School in Timișoara).

== Elected members of the Chamber of Deputies ==
- 1990–1992: Milenco Luchin / Milenko Lukin
- 1992–2008: Slavomir Gvozdenovici / Slavomir Gvozdenović
- 2008–2012: Dușan Popov / Dušan Popov
- 2012–2016: Slavomir Gvozdenovici / Slavomir Gvozdenović
- 2016-2020: Slavoliub Adnagi / Slavoljub Adnađ
- Since 2020: Ognean Cîrstici/ Ognjan Krstić

== See also ==
- Romanian ethnic minorities parties
