= Slavomir Gvozdenovici =

Romanian and Serbian writer

PhD Slavomir Gvozdenovici
- Славомир Гвозденовић
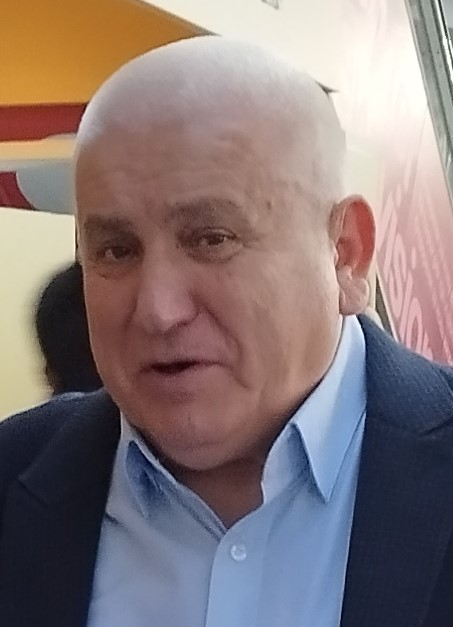
- Gvozdenovici in 2022

Member of the Chamber of Deputies of Romania
- In office 1992–2008
- In office 2012–2016

Personal details
- Born: 10 March 1953 (age 73) Belobreșca, Caraș-Severin County, Romanian People's Republic
- Party: Union of Serbs of Romania
- Education: University of Bucharest
- Occupation: Writer, poet, politician

Slavomir Gvozdenovici (Serbian: Славомир Гвозденовић / Slavomir Gvozdenović, born 10 March 1953) is a Romanian and Serbian writer, poet, politician, and a social and public worker of the Serbian minority in Romania.

== Biography ==
He was born on 10 March 1953 in Belobreșca, Caraș-Severin County, Romania. He attended middle school in Belobreșca, and later high school in the Serbian section at Lyceum No. 1 in Timisoara. In 1972, he enrolled at the Faculty of Philology, Department of Serbian Language and Literature in Bucharest at the University of Bucharest. After graduating from the university in 1976, he worked as a teacher in the elementary school in Liubcova, then in the elementary school in Belobreşca and as an editor of the Timisoara newspaper "Banatske novine" (1983–1985). Since 1996, he has been teaching Serbian literature at the Department of Serbian Language and Literature at the Western University in Timisoara. He specialized in summer courses and seminars in Zagreb, Dubrovnik, Belgrade, Priština and Novi Sad. In 2000, he defended his doctoral dissertation Language and Style in the Poetry of Vasko Popa at the University of Bucharest. He has been the editor-in-chief of the Literary Life magazine since 1985 in Timisoara. He published 30 books of poetry, prepared a dozen anthologies of Serbian literature, and his poetry is represented in dozens of Serbian, Romanian and European anthologies, as well as in Serbian textbooks. He translates Serbian and Romanian poetry, and his works have been translated into a dozen languages. He is a member of the Writers Union of Romania, the Association of Writers of Republika Srpska, the Writers' Association of Vojvodina and an honorary member of the Association of Writers of Serbia. He has been a research associate of Matica srpska since 1995 and a co-founder of "Vuk's endowment".

== Politics ==
He is one of the founders of the Union of Serbs of Romania and its president from 2004 to 2012. Thanks to his effort the Serbian Home was built in the settlement of Iosefin in Timisoara, where the premises of the Union of Serbs of Romania, the offices of the magazines "Nasa reč" and "Književni život" and the newspaper "Novi timišvarski vesnik" are located. He personally organized 5 large and 20 smaller cultural events, which became a tradition. He was a member of the Chamber of Deputies of Romania from 1992 to 2008, and was re-elected in 2012. In 2010, he was elected the first President of the Assembly of the Diaspora and the Serbs in the region.

== Awards ==
He has won several important literary awards in Romania and Serbia. At the International Meeting of Balkan Writers in Bor in 1988, he won the "Bor Grumen", the Special Jury Charter of the "Branko Miljković" Award in 1989 for the work Underlining the Line, the "Šušnjar" Award of the Serbian Writers' Association in 1995 for the House with Fire and Ice, Award of the Timisoara Branch of the Writers' Union of Romania in 1995 for the Word and Light, the Serbian Orthodox Church award at the 4th Yugoslav Children's Poetry Festival in 1997. National Award of the Writers' Union of Romania for the work And, award and cross "Arsenije Čarnojević" of the Ministry of Diaspora and the Association of Writers of Serbia, award "Poetic Success" 2012 from the Literary Society of Kosovo and Metohija at the international cultural event "Sokolica 2012" and the international award "Branko Radičević" of Branko's Circle 2013 for the overall poetic and creative opus.

On the occasion of marking the Statehood Day in the Presidency of the Republic of Serbia at a ceremony on 15 February 2016, the President of Serbia, Tomislav Nikolić, presented Slavomir Gvozdenović with the Gold Medal of Merit – decoration for outstanding contribution in public and cultural activities, as well as for developing cooperation and friendly relations. Serbia and Romania.

== Bibliography ==
- Book and a little fire, Bucharest, 1975.
- Songs before dawn, Timisoara, 1977.
- Wing Defense, Bucharest, 1978
- Lyrics, Bucharest, 1981.
- Clear Opening of the Stone, Bucharest, 1983
- Heroism with Words, Bucharest, 1986.
- Textbook on the Vidar House, Bucharest, 1988
- Underlining, Belgrade, 1988.
- Weeping Stone, Bucharest, 1990
- Serbian Prayer in Timisoara, Novi Sad, 1991.
- Word and Light, Timisoara, 1994.
- In the House with Fire and Ice, Belgrade, 1995.
- Birth of an Ancestor, Timisoara, 1997
- And, Timisoara, 1999.
- Crnjanski in Timisoara, Belgrade, 2002
- Fear in a Trap, Timisoara, 2003
- America, Chicago and Vidovdan, Timisoara, 2003.
- A Terrible Story from Klisura, Belgrade, 2005.
- Alexandrian Schools, Smederevo, 2005
- How much Kosovo in me, Timisoara, 2007

== See also ==
- Union of Serbs of Romania
- Serbs of Romania
