= Pojejena =

Pojejena Пожежена / Požežena
- Commune
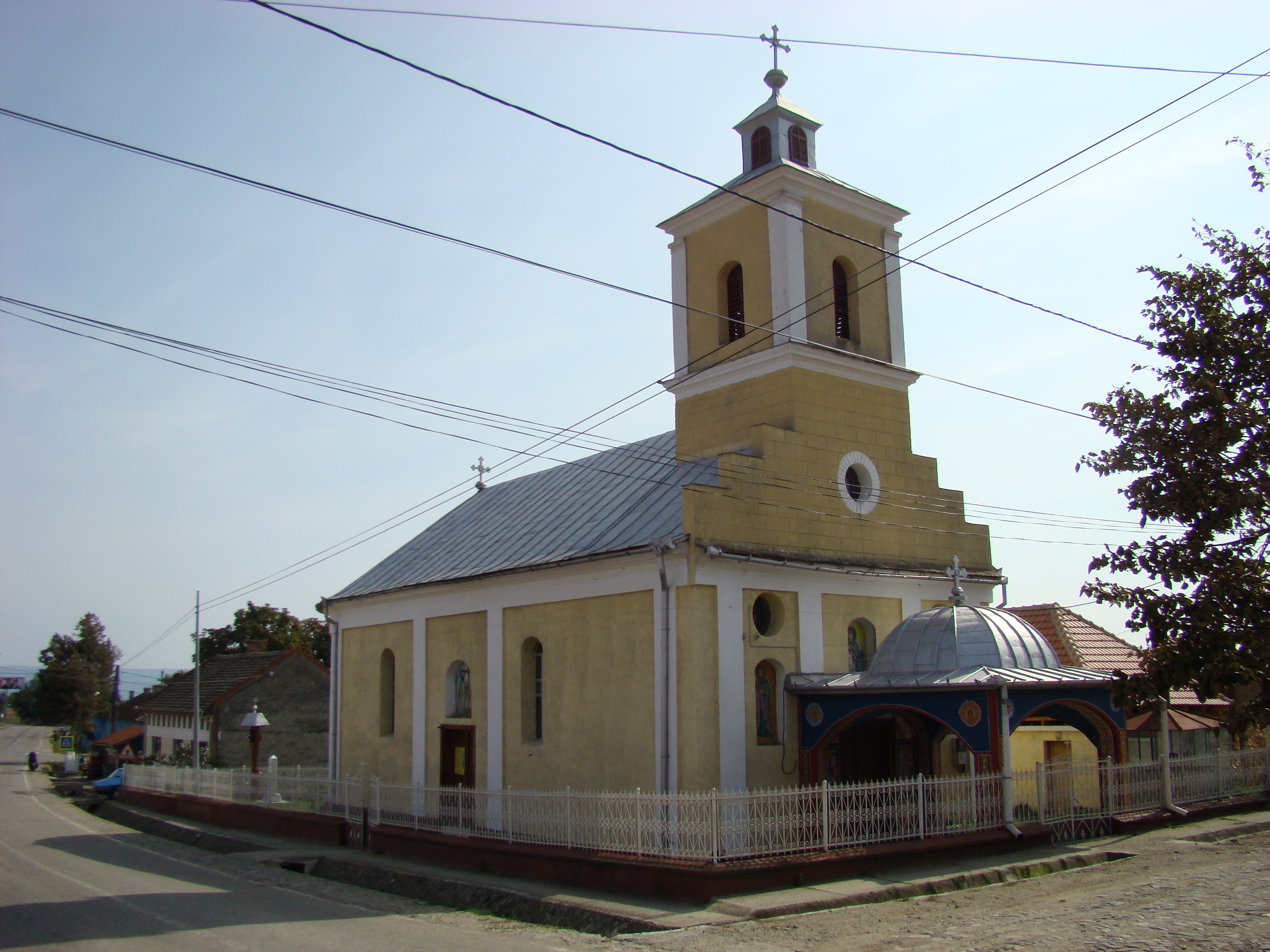
- Orthodox church in Pojejena

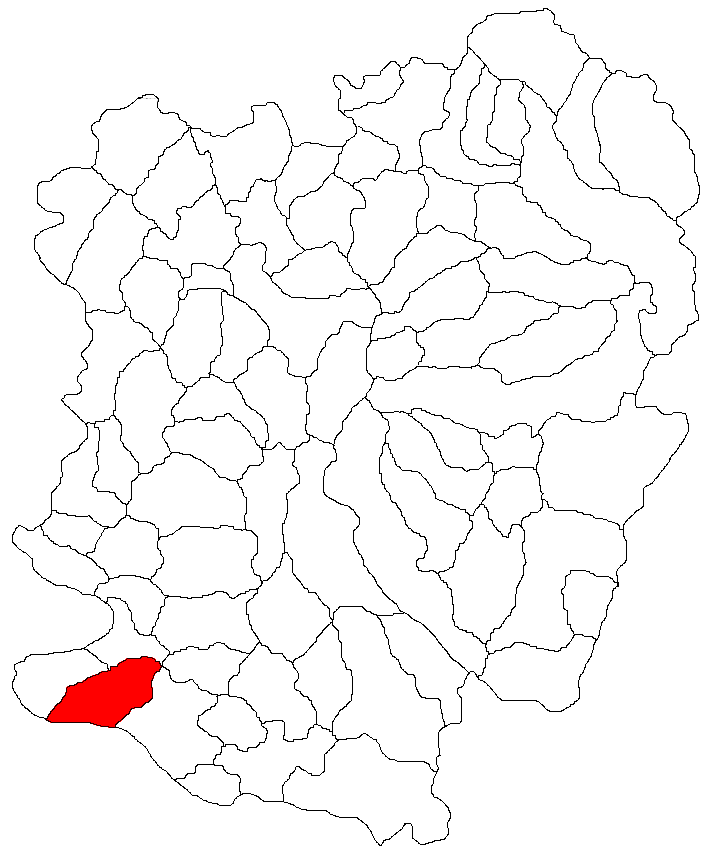
- Location in Caraș-Severin County

- Location in Romania
- Coordinates: 44°46′N 21°35′E
- Country: Romania
- County: Caraș-Severin

Government
  - Mayor (2024–2028): Mira Radovancovici (PSD)
- Area: 122.85 km^{2} (47.43 sq mi)
- Elevation: 76 m (249 ft)
- Population (2021-12-01): 2,488
  - Density: 20.25/km^{2} (52.45/sq mi)
- Time zone: UTC+02:00 (EET)
  - Summer (DST): UTC+03:00 (EEST)
- Postal code: 327300
- Area code: +(40) 255
- Vehicle reg.: CS
- Website: primariapojejena.ro

Pojejena (Romanian: Pojejena, pronounced [poʒeˈʒena]; Serbian: Пожежена or Požežena; Hungarian: Alsópozsgás) is a commune in Caraș-Severin County, Romania. The commune is located in the geographical area known as Clisura Dunării (Banatska Klisura in Serbian). It is composed of five villages: Belobreșca (Белобрешка; Fejérdomb), Divici (Дивић; Divécs), Pojejena, Radimna (Радимна; Rádonya), and Șușca (Шушка; Sisak). Since 2012, the International Pojejena Music Festival takes place there.

== Demographics ==
Historical population
Year	Pop.	±%
2002	3,300	—
2011	2,884	−12.6%
2021	2,488	−13.7%
Source: Census data

At the 2011 census, the commune had 2,884 inhabitants; of those, 52.14% were Serbs, 45.84% Romanians, and 1.12% Romani. At the 2021 census, Pojejena had a population of 2,488, of which 53.05% were Romanians and 40.31% Serbs.

== Natives ==
- Slavomir Gvozdenovici (born 1953), writer and politician

== Languages ==
The commune is officially bilingual, with both Romanian and Serbian being used as working languages on public signage and in administration, education and justice.

== Climate ==
Climate in this area has mild differences between highs and lows, and there is adequate rainfall year-round. The Köppen Climate Classification subtype for this climate is "Cfb" (Marine West Coast Climate/Oceanic climate).

Climate data for BPojejena
Month	Jan	Feb	Mar	Apr	May	Jun	Jul	Aug	Sep	Oct	Nov	Dec	Year
Mean daily maximum °C (°F)	2 (35)	4 (39)	11 (51)	17 (62)	22 (71)	24 (75)	28 (82)	28 (82)	24 (75)	17 (62)	9 (48)	3 (37)	15 (59)
Mean daily minimum °C (°F)	−2 (28)	−1 (30)	1 (33)	6 (42)	10 (50)	13 (55)	14 (57)	14 (57)	11 (51)	7 (44)	2 (35)	−1 (30)	6 (42)
Average precipitation mm (inches)	66 (2.6)	64 (2.5)	61 (2.4)	89 (3.5)	140 (5.5)	180 (7.1)	140 (5.7)	120 (4.9)	91 (3.6)	66 (2.6)	69 (2.7)	76 (3)	1,200 (46)
Source: Weatherbase

== See also ==
- Clisura Dunării
- Serbs in Romania
