= Slavoliub Adnagi =

Romanian politician

- Славољуб Аднађ

Member of the Chamber of Deputies of Romania
- Incumbent
- Assumed office 21 December 2016

Personal details
- Born: 26 December 1965 (age 60) Timișoara, Romania
- Party: Union of Serbs of Romania

Slavoliub Adnagi (Serbian Cyrillic: Славољуб Аднађ, born 26 December 1965) is a Romanian politician of Serb descent.

== Politics ==
He is a member of the Union of Serbs of Romania and has been serving as a Member of the Chamber of Deputies of Romania since 2016. He is part of the "Parliamentary Group of National Minorities" and is a member of the friendship groups with Serbia, Austria, Switzerland and Latvia. Due to his efforts, the day of Saint Sava got proclaimed a national holiday in Romania.

== See also ==
- Serbs of Romania
- Parliament of Romania
