= Clisura Dunării =

Geographical region in Romania

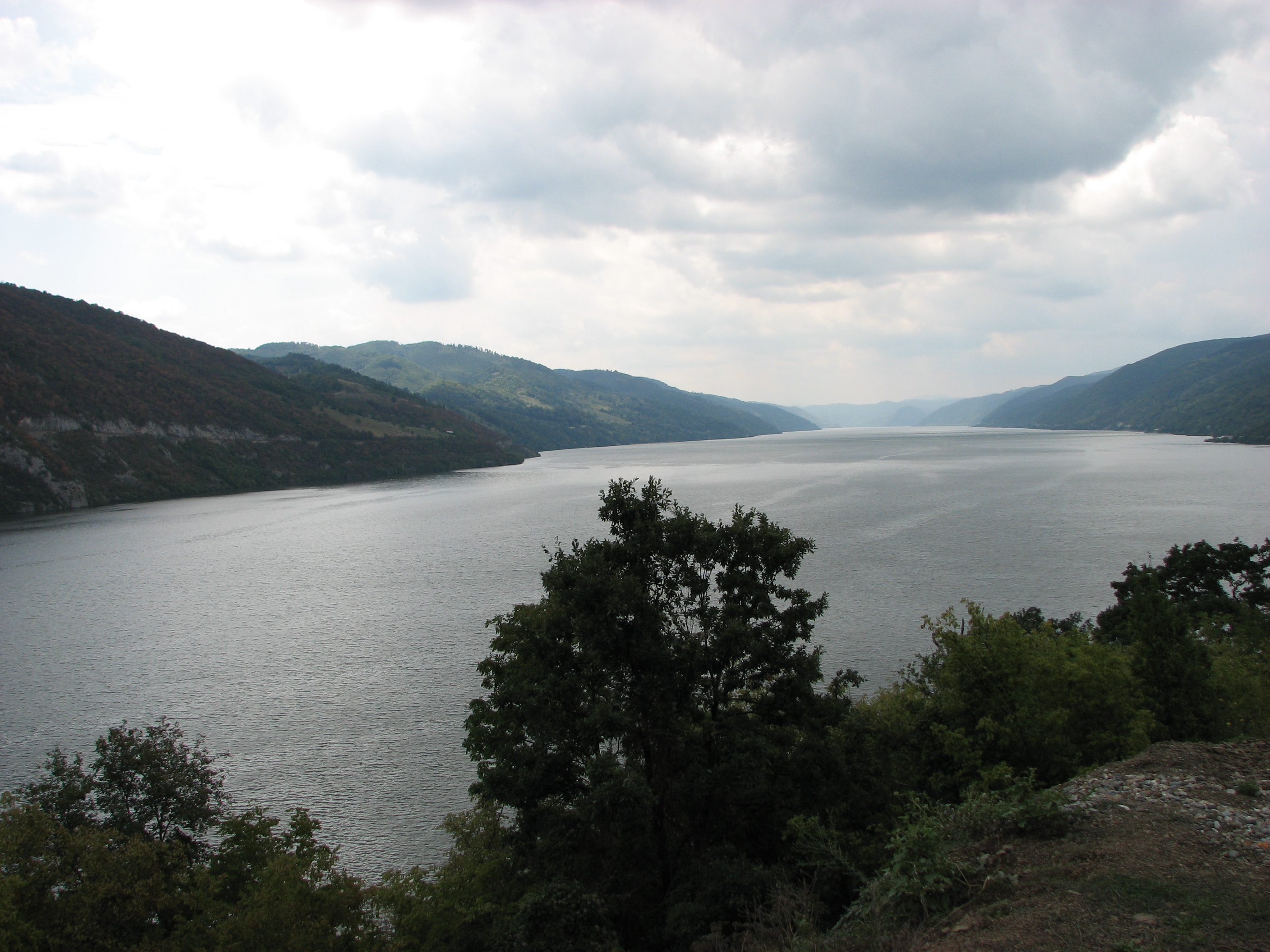
Danube gorge

Defileul Dunării, also locally known as Clisura Dunării (Serbian: Банатска Клисура / Banatska Klisura) is a geographical region in Romania. It is located in southern Banat, along the northern bank of the river Danube. Clisura Dunării is situated between river Nera in the west, and Gura Văii or Cazanele Dunării in the east.

The area includes the municipality of Orșova and the town of Moldova Nouă, as well as several communes (Socol, Pojejena, Coronini, Gârnic, Sichevița, Berzasca, Svinița, Dubova, Eșelnița, Ilovița, and Breznița-Ocol).

== Name ==
The Romanian name is Defileul Dunării. River Danube is called Dunărea in Romanian. The sometimes used local name clisura derives from Serbian; Klisura means "pass", "gorge", "gate" and "sharp rock" in Serbian. It is derived from the Greek kleisoura, which in turn derives from the Latin clausura, meaning "closed entity", ide est "monastery, castle, fort". The term was applied by the Byzantines to fortified mountain districts controlling important passes.

== Geography ==
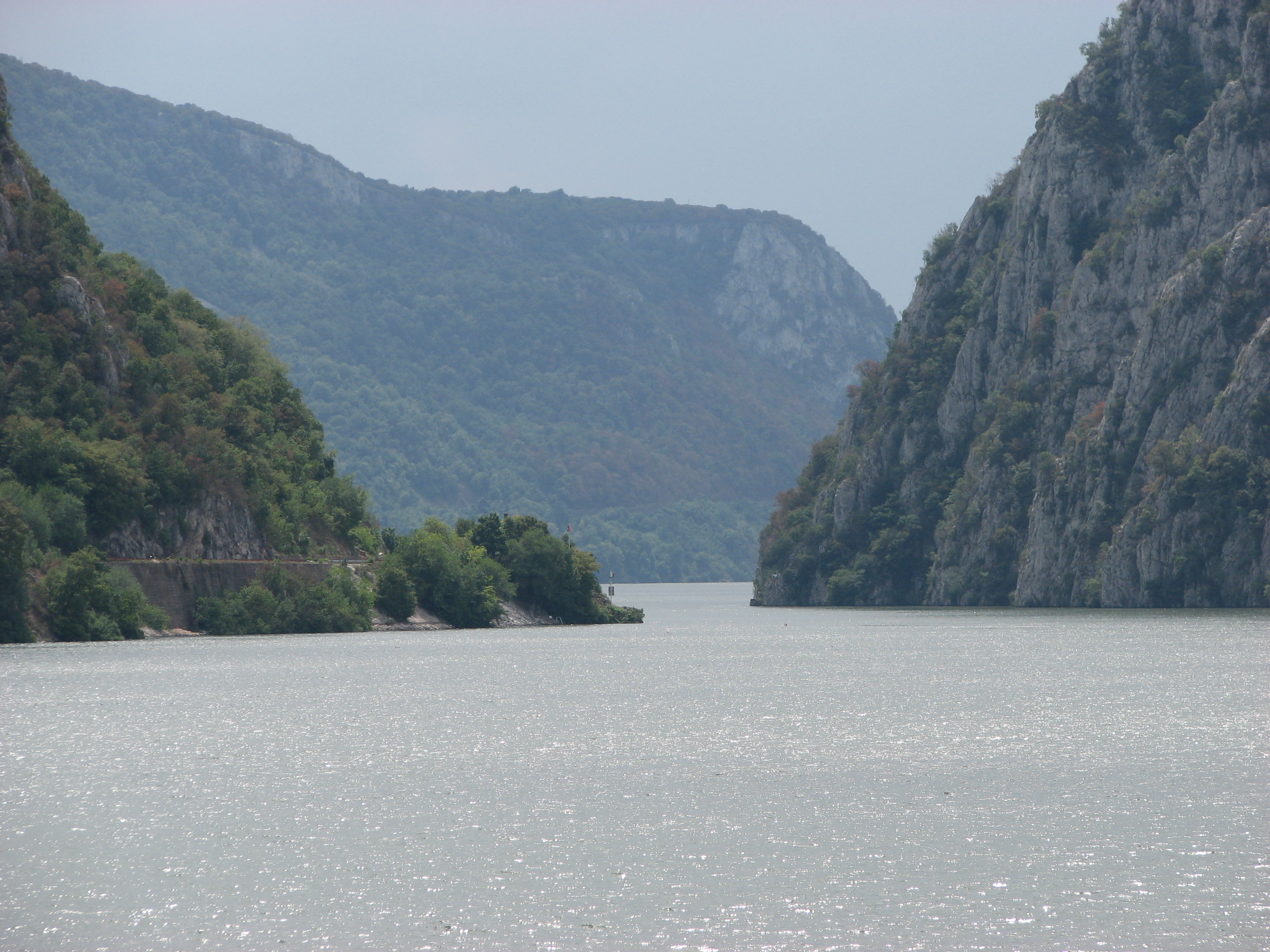
Danube gorge

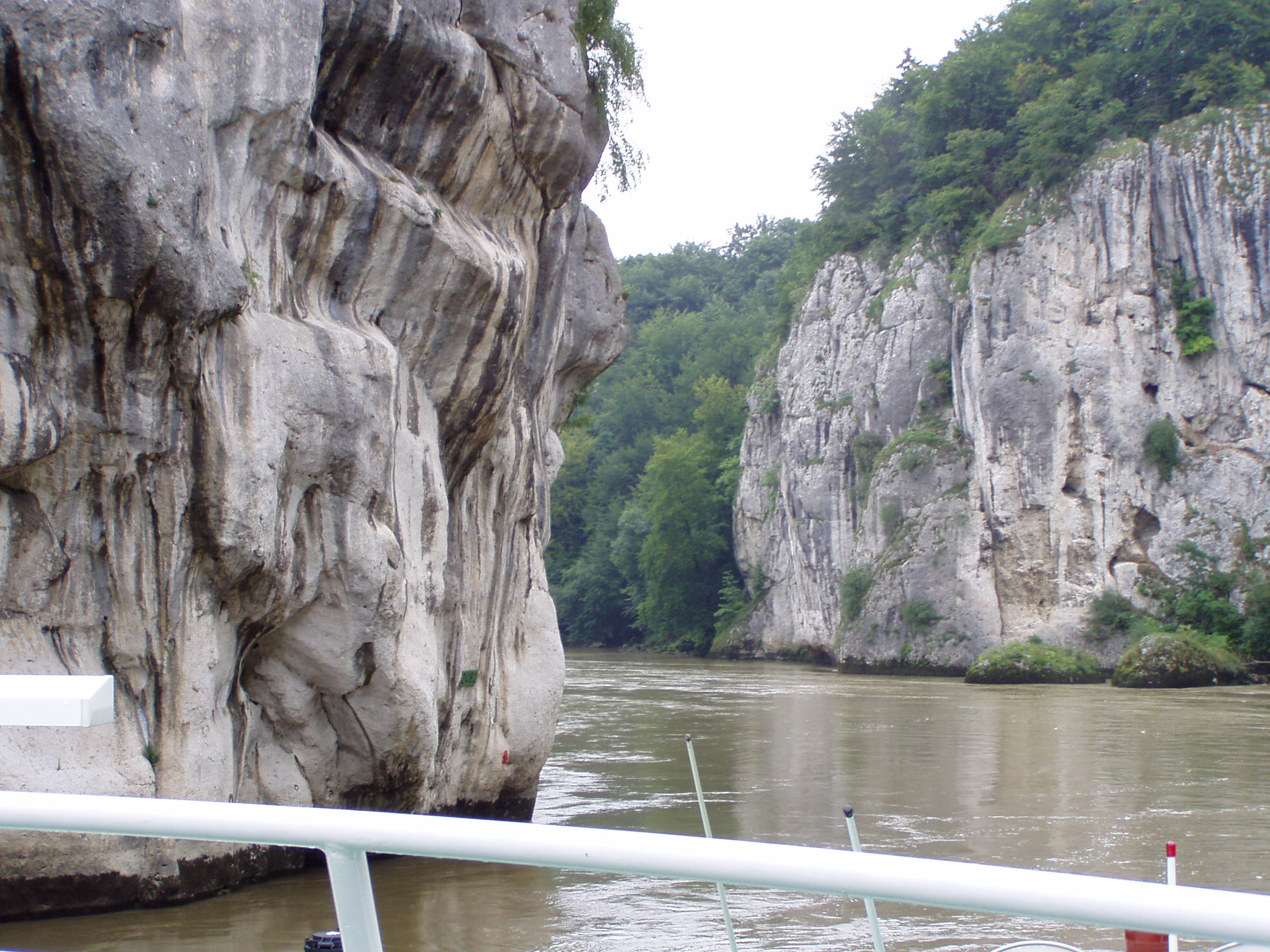
Danube gorge

The region is located in southern Romanian Banat, along the northern bank of the river Danube, at the border with Serbia. It spans from the Nera in the west, and Gura Văii or Cazanele Dunării in the east. The settlements lie in the foothills and river banks below the Banat mountains of Locva and Almăj. The Danube enters by the Baziaș village. The distance between Baziaș and Gura Văii is ca. 140 km. On the other side of the Danube, in Serbia, the municipalities are Veliko Gradište, Golubac, and Majdanpek.

== History ==
Historically, the region belonged to the Banatian Military Frontier of the Habsburg monarchy, and was divided into "Vlach" (Romanian) and Serb sections.

With the Treaty of Trianon (1920), the region was given to Romania.

During World War II, the Serbs in the region supported the Yugoslav Partisans.

== Demographics ==
The region has a trans-ethnic character owing to the co-habitation of Romanians and Serbs.

The population of the region is composed of Romanians, Czechs and Serbs. Most of the localities have a Romanian majority, while Socol, Pojejena, and Svinița are majority Serb. The Czech presence is especially in and around Gârnic.

== Notable people ==
- Radenko Almažanović (1891–1941), Serbian actor, worked in the Novi Sad theatre.
- Miodrag Belodedici (born 1964), Romanian retired footballer, won the European cup with Steaua București and Red Star Belgrade (1985, 1990).

== See also ==
- Iron Gate (Danube), Iron Gates Natural Park
