= Socol =

Socol Соколовац
- Commune
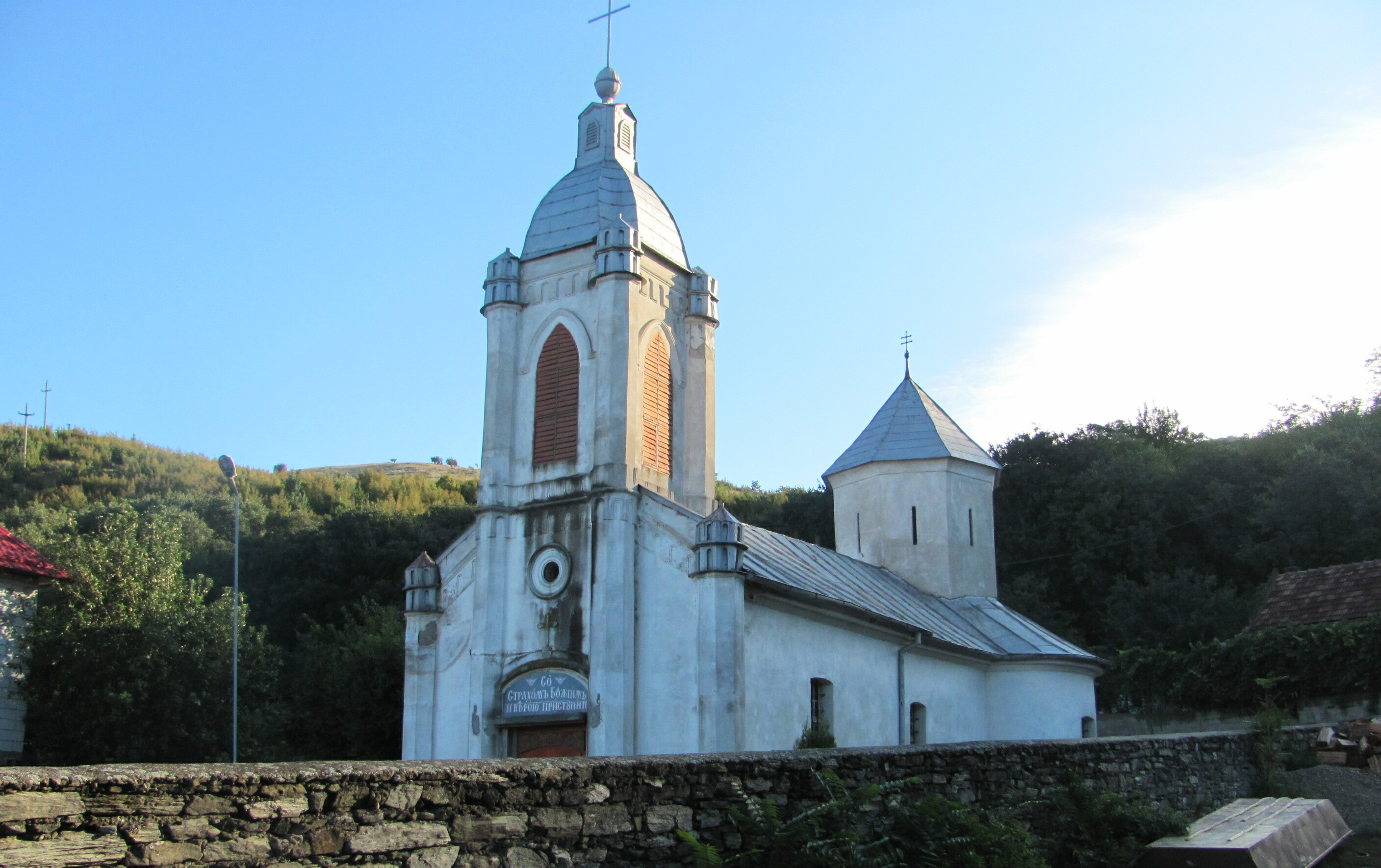
- Saint Sava Church in Baziaș

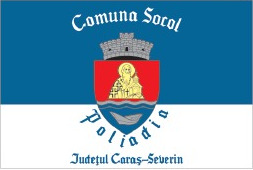
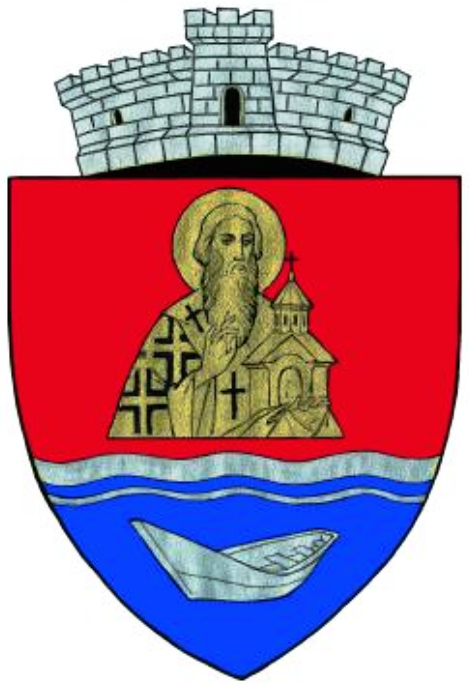
- Flag Coat of arms

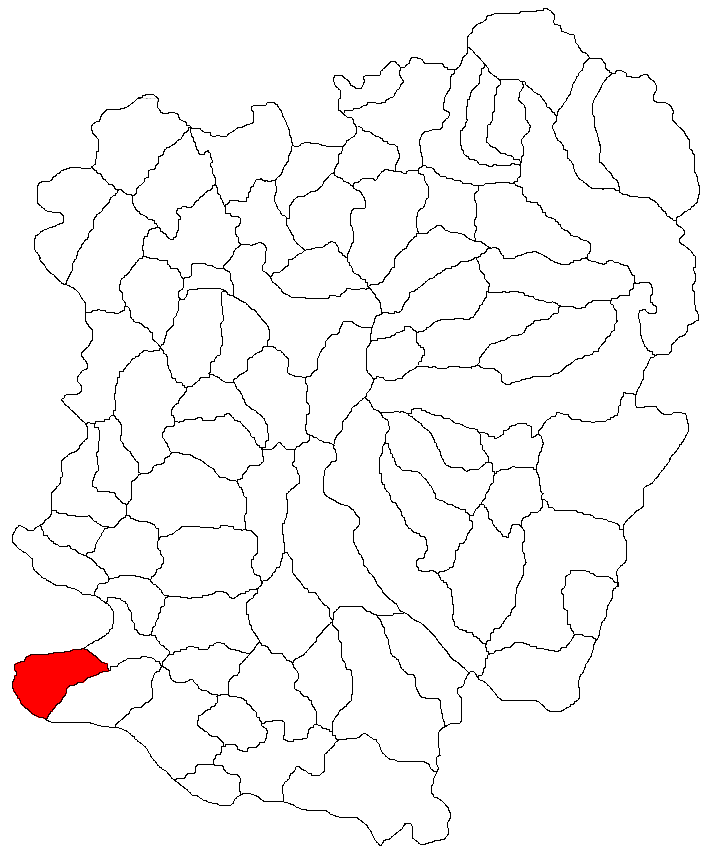
- Location in Caraș-Severin County

- Location in Romania
- Coordinates: 44°51′N 21°23′E
- Country: Romania
- County: Caraș-Severin

Government
  - Mayor (2020–2024): Olgița Ghiță (PSD)
- Area: 75.32 km^{2} (29.08 sq mi)
- Elevation: 76 m (249 ft)
- Population (2021-12-01): 1,602
  - Density: 21.27/km^{2} (55.09/sq mi)
- Time zone: UTC+02:00 (EET)
  - Summer (DST): UTC+03:00 (EEST)
- Postal code: 327365
- Area code: +(40) 255
- Vehicle reg.: CS
- Website: primariasocol.ro

Socol (Romanian: Socol, Serbian: Соколовац / Sokolovac, Hungarian: Nérasolymos) is a commune in Caraș-Severin County, Romania (in the Clisura Dunării area of Banat). It is composed of five villages: Baziaș (Базјаш, Báziás), Câmpia (Луговет, Néramező), Pârneaura (Прњавор), Socol, and Zlatița (Златица, Néraaranyos).

Sokol means "falcon" in Serbian. The commune is officially bilingual, with both Romanian and Serbian being used as working languages on public signage and in administration, education, and justice.

== Demographics ==
Historical population
Year	Pop.	±%
1880	3,759	—
1910	4,928	+31.1%
1930	4,516	−8.4%
1977	3,000	−33.6%
2002	2,301	−23.3%
2011	1,933	−16.0%
2021	1,602	−17.1%
Source: Census data

At the 2011 census, the population of the commune numbered 1,933 people and included 52.9% Serbs, 36.8% Romanians, 5.6% Roma, 3.7% Czechs, and 0.6% Hungarians. At the 2021 census, Socol had a population of 1,602; of those, 49.13% were Romanians, 38.39% Serbs, and 2.75% Czechs.

== Baziaș ==
Baziaș is a village of Socol commune, notable as the place where the Danube enters Romania, and where, in 1854, the first railway line was opened on the territory of present-day Romania—the line ran from Baziaș to Oravița, at a time when the area was under Austrian administration. The village has a significant Serbian heritage, being the site of Baziaș Monastery, said to have been founded in 1225 by Saint Sava while on a brief refuge there, and rebuilt several times. The local forest includes several protected plant species.

== Natives ==
- Miodrag Belodedici (born 1964), a former world-class soccer player
- Petru Dumitriu (1924–2002), novelist

== See also ==
- Serbs in Romania
