= Svinița =

Communes in Mehedinți County, Romania

Svinița Свињица / Svinjica
- Commune
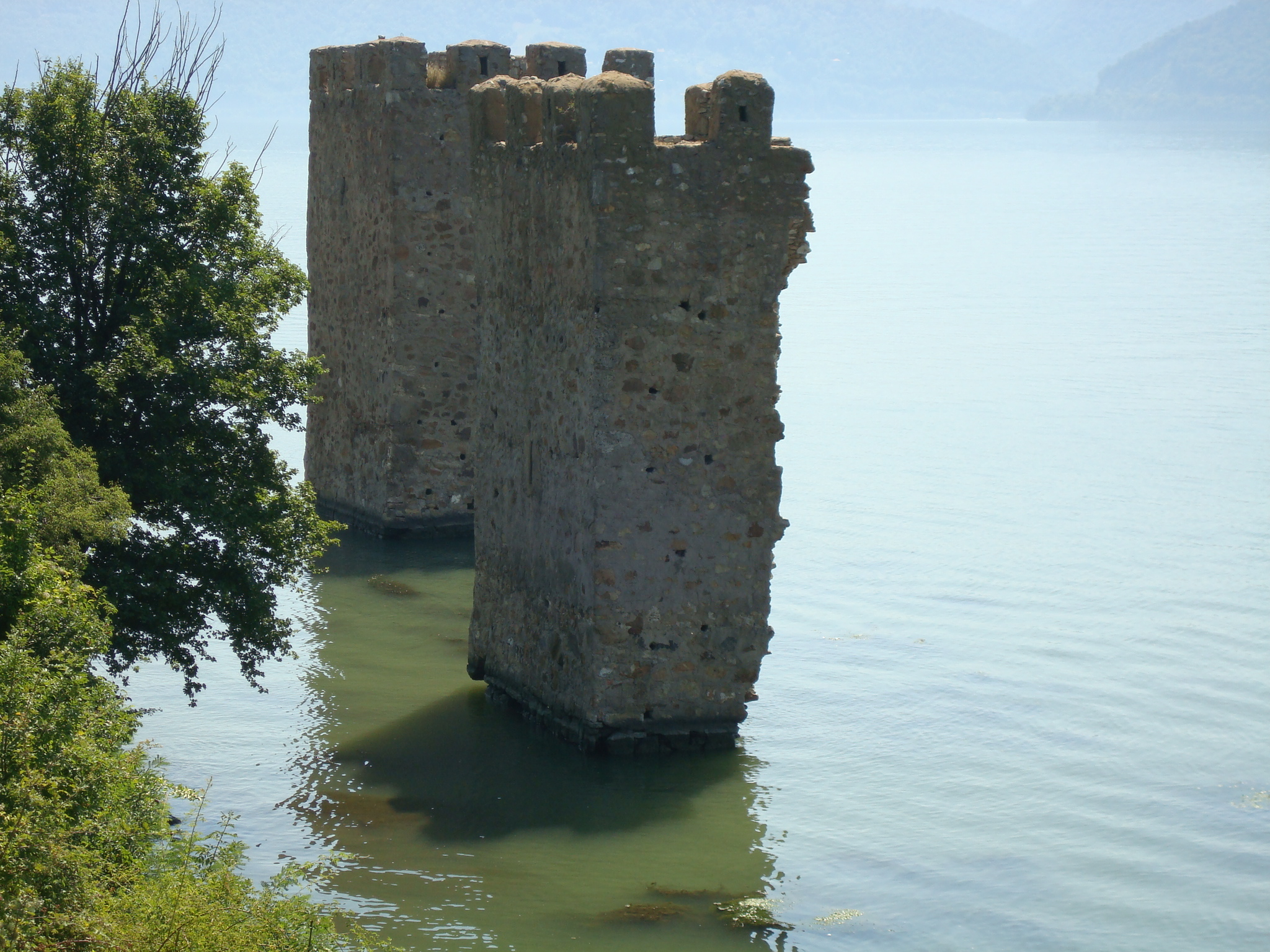
- Ruins at Tri Kule, by the Danube

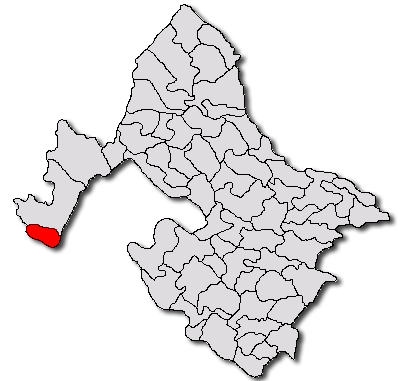
- Location in Mehedinți County

- Location in Romania
- Coordinates: 44°30′N 22°06′E
- Country: Romania
- County: Mehedinți

Government
  - Mayor (2020–2024): Nicolaie Curici (PSD)
- Area: 91.45 km^{2} (35.31 sq mi)
- Elevation: 135 m (443 ft)
- Population (2021-12-01): 741
  - Density: 8.10/km^{2} (21.0/sq mi)
- Time zone: UTC+02:00 (EET)
  - Summer (DST): UTC+03:00 (EEST)
- Postal code: 227440
- Area code: +(40) 252
- Vehicle reg.: MH
- Website: primariasvinita.ro

Svinița (Romanian: Svinița, Serbian: Свињица or Svinjica, Hungarian: Szinice) is a commune in Mehedinți County, Romania, located on the Danube (in the area of the Banat known as Clisura Dunării – Banatska Klisura in Serbian). It is composed of a single village, Svinița. It is one of four localities in the county located in the Banat.

== Name ==
The name Svinjica means "the pig place" or "little pig" in Serbian.

== History ==
In the autumn of 1848, the locality was the site of a daring escape of Wallachian revolutionaries kept in Ottoman custody. Maria Rosetti and Constantin Daniel Rosenthal called on the local mayor to demand that Ottoman guards hand in their weapons on what was at the time Austrian soil, and all persons arrested were consequently free to go.

== Demographics ==
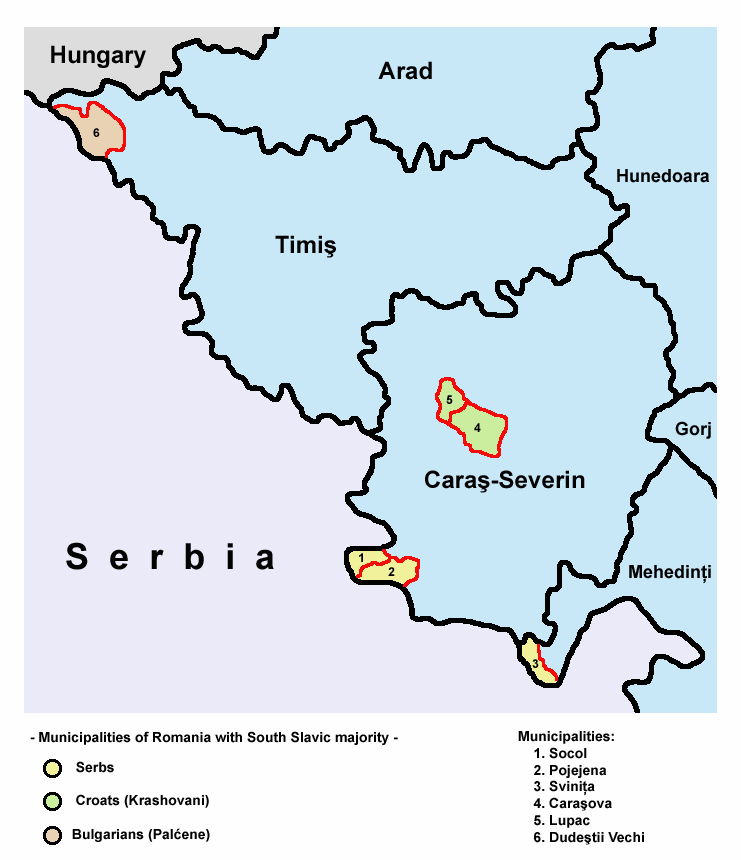
South Slavic communities in southwestern Romania

At the 2011 census, Svinița had 925 inhabitants, of which 90.3% were Serbs, 6.5% Romanians, 0.9% Roma, and 2.3% others or of unknown ethnic origin. Most of the inhabitants of the commune (90.3%) were Serbian Orthodox by religion, while most of the rest were Romanian Orthodox (6.5%). At the 2021 census, the population had decreased to 741; of those, 87.85% were Serbs and 6.61% Romanians.

== Languages ==
The commune is officially bilingual, with both Romanian and Serbian being used as working languages on public signage and in administration, education and justice.

== Notes ==
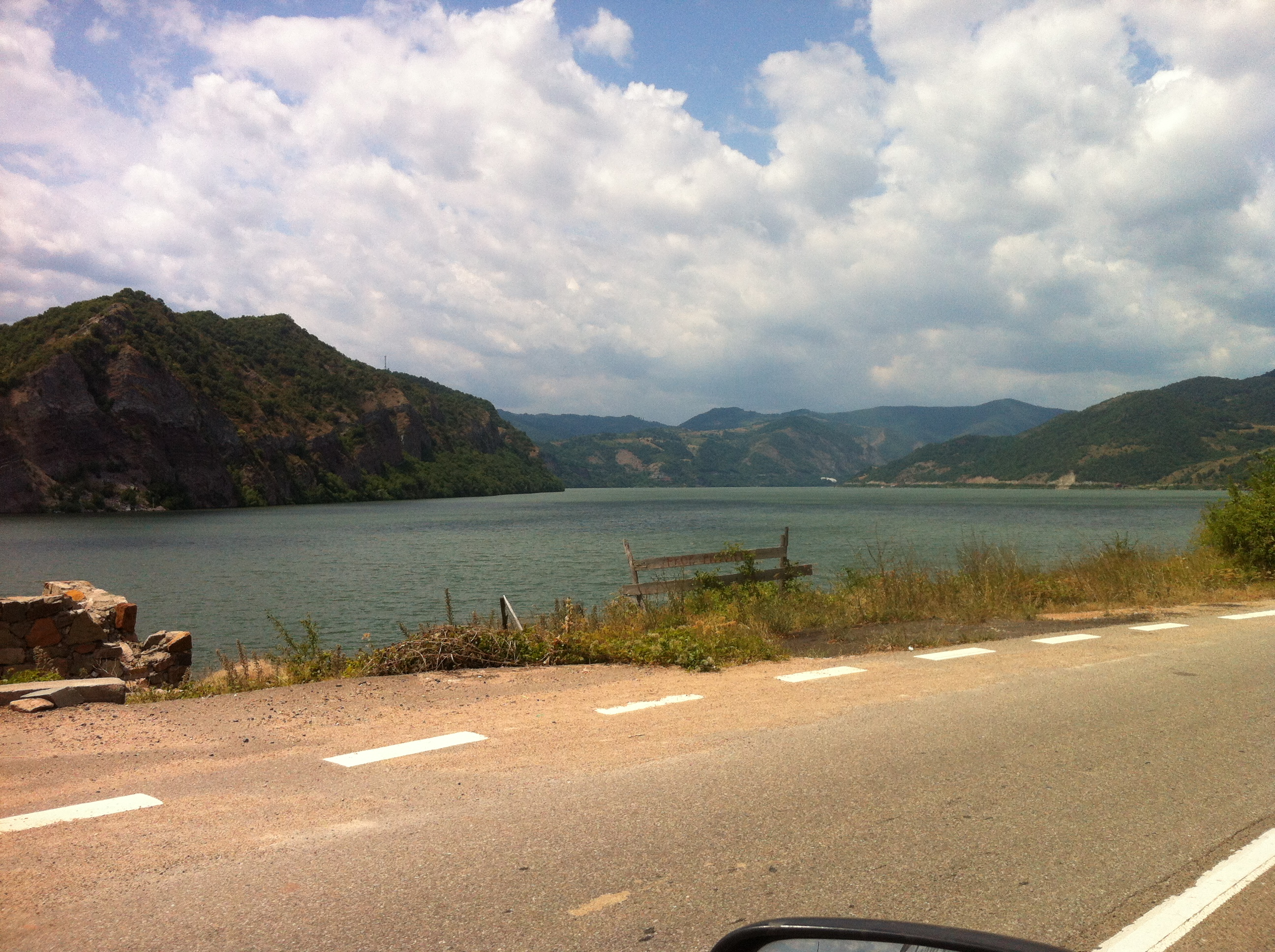
The Danube at Svinița

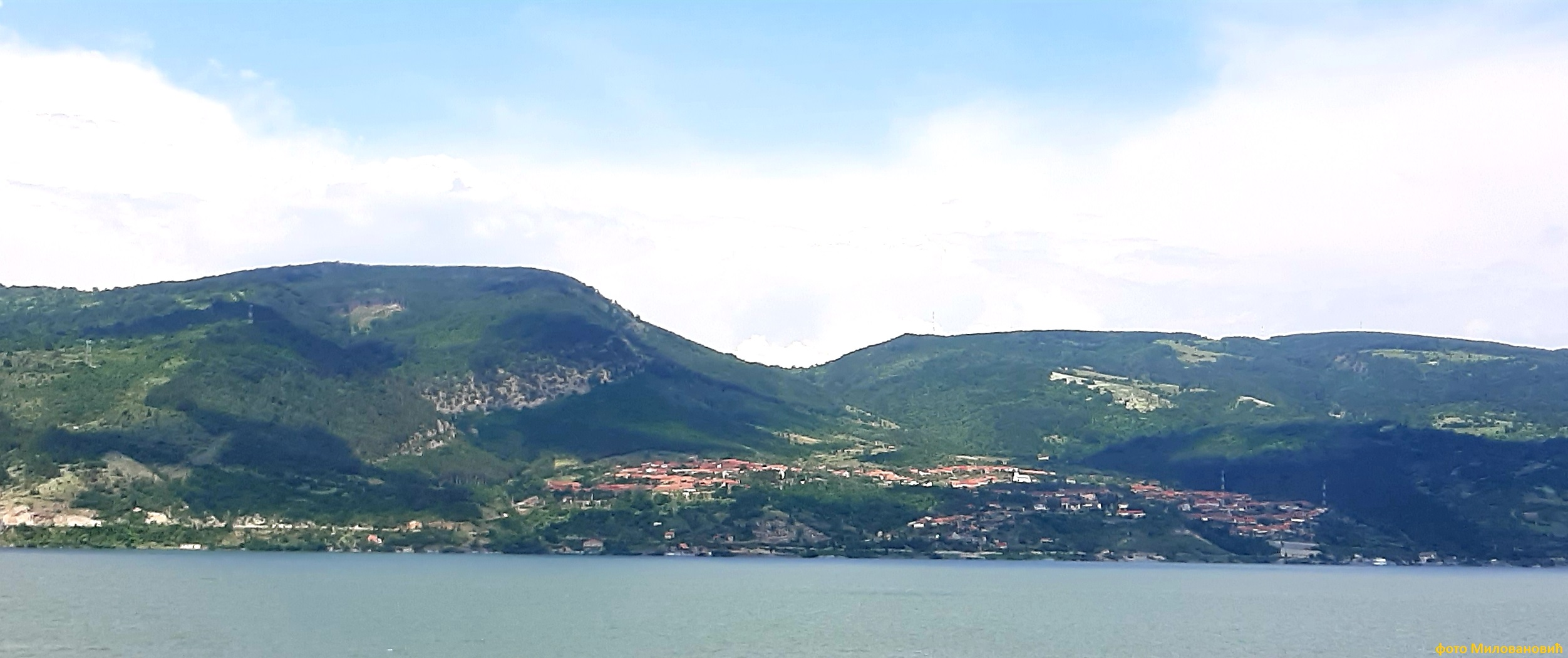
View of Svinița from across the Danube
