= Partoș Monastery =

Monastery in Banloc, Romania

- Mănăstirea Partoș
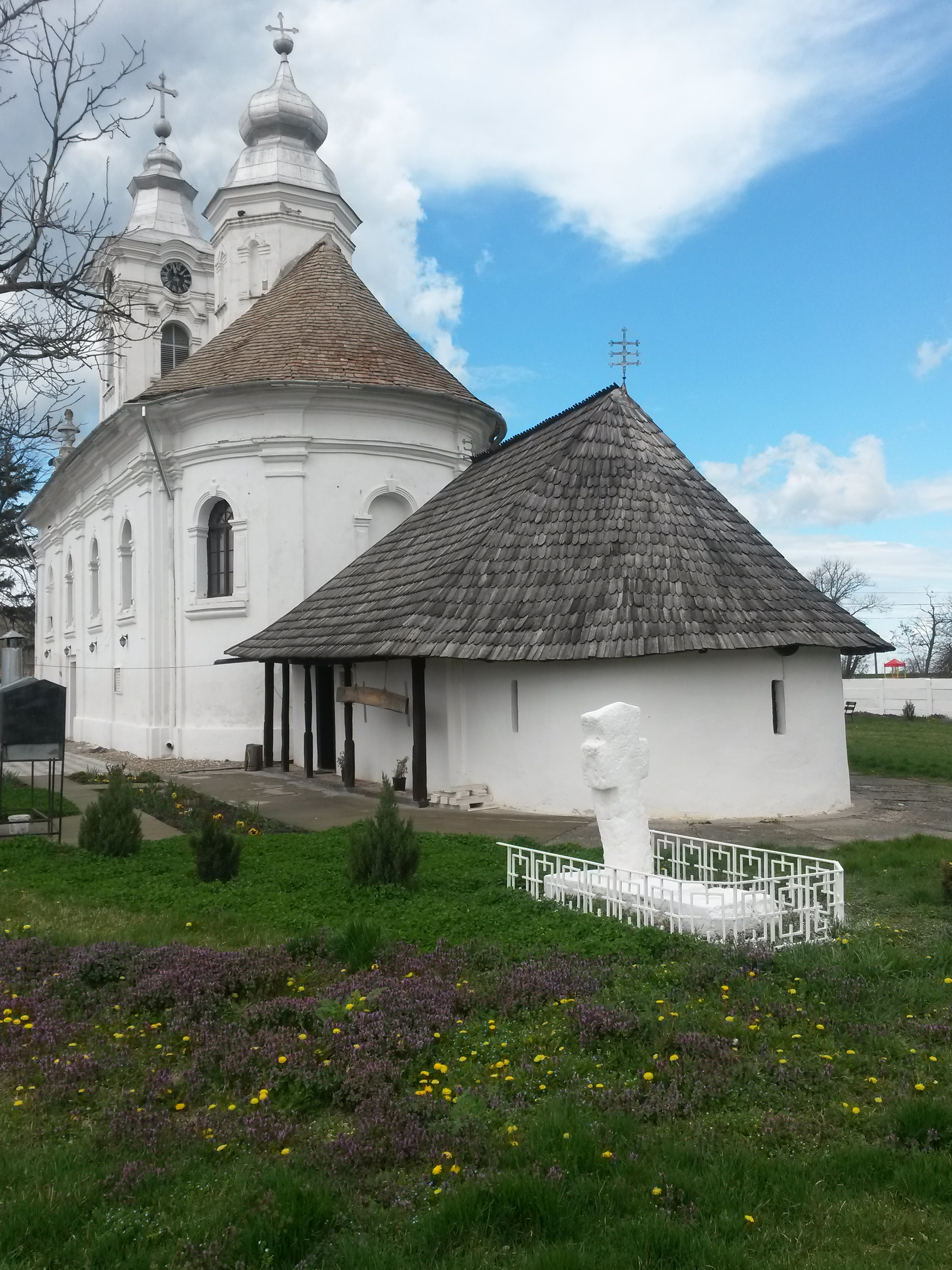
- Interactive map of Partoș Monastery

Monastery information
- Full name: St. Joseph the New from Partoș Monastery
- Denomination: Romanian Orthodox
- Established: Late 15th century
- Disestablished: 1777
- Reestablished: 2008
- Dedication: Exaltation of the Holy Cross; St. Joseph the New from Partoș
- Archdiocese: Archiepiscopate of Timișoara
- Diocese: Metropolis of Banat
- Controlled churches: 2

People
- Founder: Jovan Branković

Architecture
- Functional status: Active
- Heritage designation: TM-II-a-A-06270

Site
- Location: Partoș (Banloc), Timiș County
- Country: Romania
- Coordinates: 45°20′7″N 21°7′27″E
- Website: partos.ro

Partoș Monastery (Romanian: Mănăstirea Partoș) is a Romanian Orthodox monastery in the village of the same name, part of the commune of Banloc in Timiș County, Romania. Originally a Serbian monastery, it was abolished by imperial will in 1777 and re-established in 2008 as a Romanian monastery for monks.

== History ==
=== Old Serbian monastery ===
The oldest mention of Partoș Monastery dates from 1571, 19 years after the occupation of Banat by the Turks, when hieromonk Lavrentije Crnogorac, on his way to Brașov and Alba Iulia, stayed here and commissioned The Four Gospels printed at the Mrkšina crkva printing house in 1562. The old monastery used to lie on the right bank of today's Bârzava Canal, a few kilometers southwest of the Sveti Đurađ Monastery. According to a document from 1771, it is said that the monastery was founded by Serbian despot Jovan Branković at the end of the 15th century. The Austrian map of Banat from 1723 depicts the monastery as isolated, surrounded by extensive forests and marshes.

The monastery church was dedicated to the Holy Archangels Michael and Gabriel, and the iconostasis was painted by zographers Popović and Ranite around 1740. The church was built of brick, but even that was damaged during floods. Its renovation was already carried out in 1767, with the help of a loan of 300 fl. taken from Georgije Kapamadžija of Ciacova. The single-nave low-rise church building was given a high baroque tower on this occasion. Veliki Bečkerek icon painter Dimitrije Popović was hired in 1771 to work in the monastery church. As of 1771, the monastery treasury featured parts of the head of St. Archdeacon Stephen. Local tradition has it the large church of the monastery was built between 1750 and 1753 by Marcu Muțiu as a sign of gratitude for what he studied here (in the 18th century Partoș housed a training school for teachers and priests from Banat) and because his daughter was healed through prayer at the tomb of St. Joseph the New. From the entire monastic complex before 1750, only the chapel survived. Modest in appearance, its plan respects the configuration of the old nave-type churches, ending towards the east in a semicircle that indicates the place of the altar.

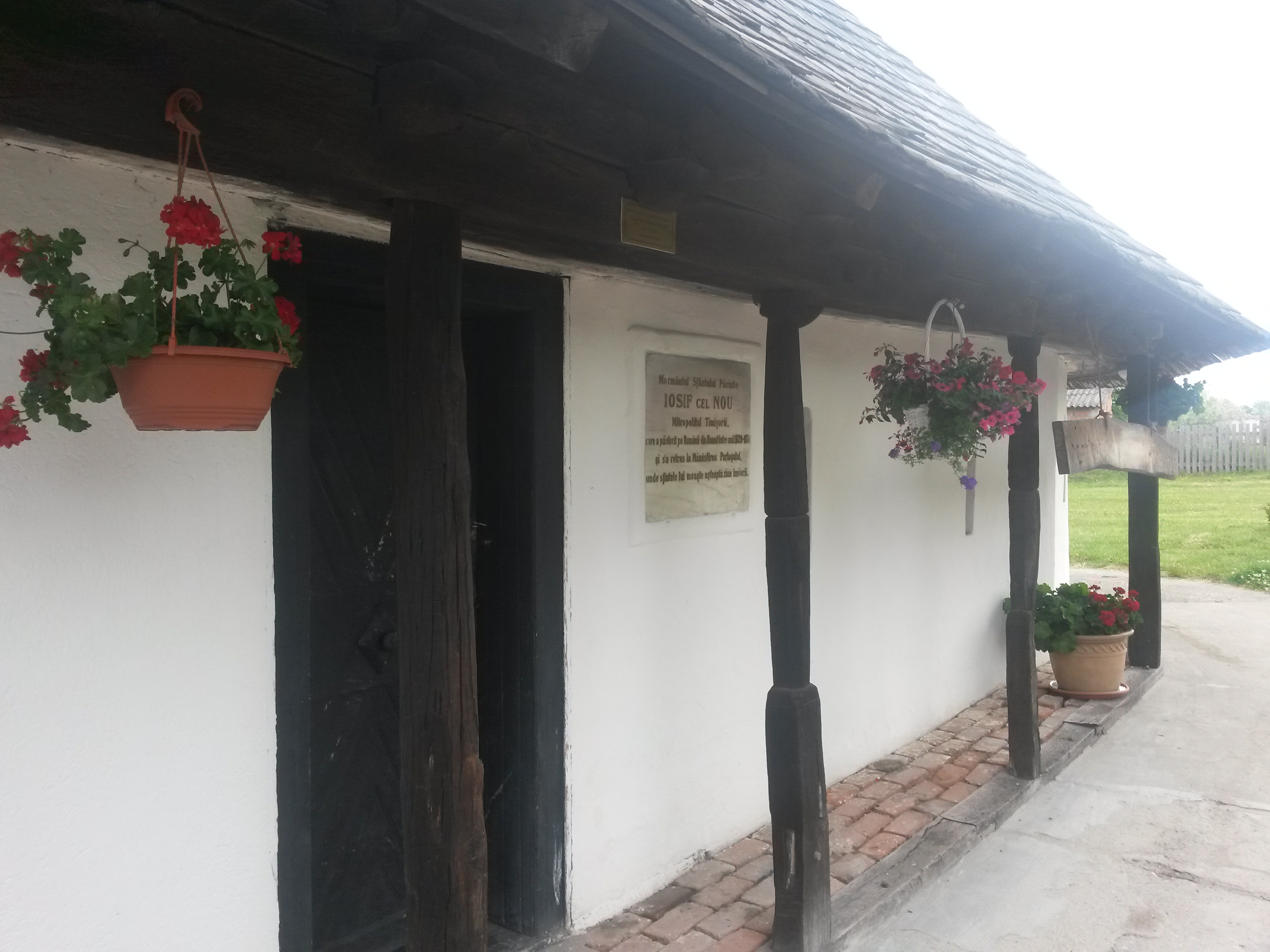
The old chapel where Metropolitan Joseph of Timișoara spent the last three years of his life is the only element left from the former Serbian medieval monastery.

In 1655, Metropolitan Joseph of Timișoara voluntarily retired to the Partoș Monastery, where he would die three years later. He was buried in the nave of the church, next to the entrance door. Metropolitan Joseph of Timișoara was canonized as St. Joseph the New, first by Romanians (1956), then by Serbs (1965). His relics were unearthed during the excavations of 1955–1956 and transferred to the Timișoara Orthodox Cathedral, where they are preserved to this day.

In 1666, the monks sent by the Patriarchate of Peć (İpek in Turkish) came to Banat for the second time for almsgiving (the first time in 1660) and met at the Partoș Monastery the abbot kyr Ștefan (who according to the appellation came from a Greek monastery or was sent by the Patriarchate of Constantinople) and the priest Bratul. The presence of an hegumen proves that the monastery had more inhabitants and that it was well organized under the Turks. The hieromonks of the monastery have always performed parish duties in the prnjavor (a 'village on a monastery's property') of the same name. According to the tax census from 1743, the inhabitants of the monastery prnjavor were Serbs. The monastery book treasury consisted mostly of church books in Serbian and Church Slavonic (32), while there were a few Romanian titles (3).

=== Abolition ===
In 1777, by the resolution of Empress Maria Theresa of 12 January, during the reorganization of Orthodox monasteries, the Partoș Monastery was closed and abolished, together with the Šemljug Monastery. Its proximity to Sveti Đurađ monastery rendered it "redundant". It was requested that the monastery be united with the Bezdin or Sveti Đurađ monasteries, and the property transferred to them. According to the unanimous decision of the commission from Timișoara, Partoș was nevertheless merged with Sveti Đurađ.

=== New Romanian monastery ===
In 1944, under the care of the Diocesan Center, the monastery was reactivated, with nuns settling here. During the communist years, the monastic life here was interrupted, its place being taken by the Partoș parish. On 6 March 2008, the Metropolitan Synod of the Metropolis of Banat, meeting under the presidency of Metropolitan Nicolae of Banat, decided, based on the proposal of the Diocesan Council, to re-establish the Partoș Monastery, intended for monks.

After the monastery was re-established, important renovation and maintenance works were carried out on the interior of the two churches and the entire premises. On 8 November 2012, the "Queen Elisabeth House" was set up in a building located right in front of the monastery, which belonged to Elisabeth of Romania, who lived at that time at Banloc Castle. It includes the Marcu Muțiu Library, with 4,000 volumes, and the Damaschin Udrea Museum Collection, made up of objects of local historical value.
