= Serbs of Romania =

Sârbii din România Срби у Румунији Srbi u Rumuniji
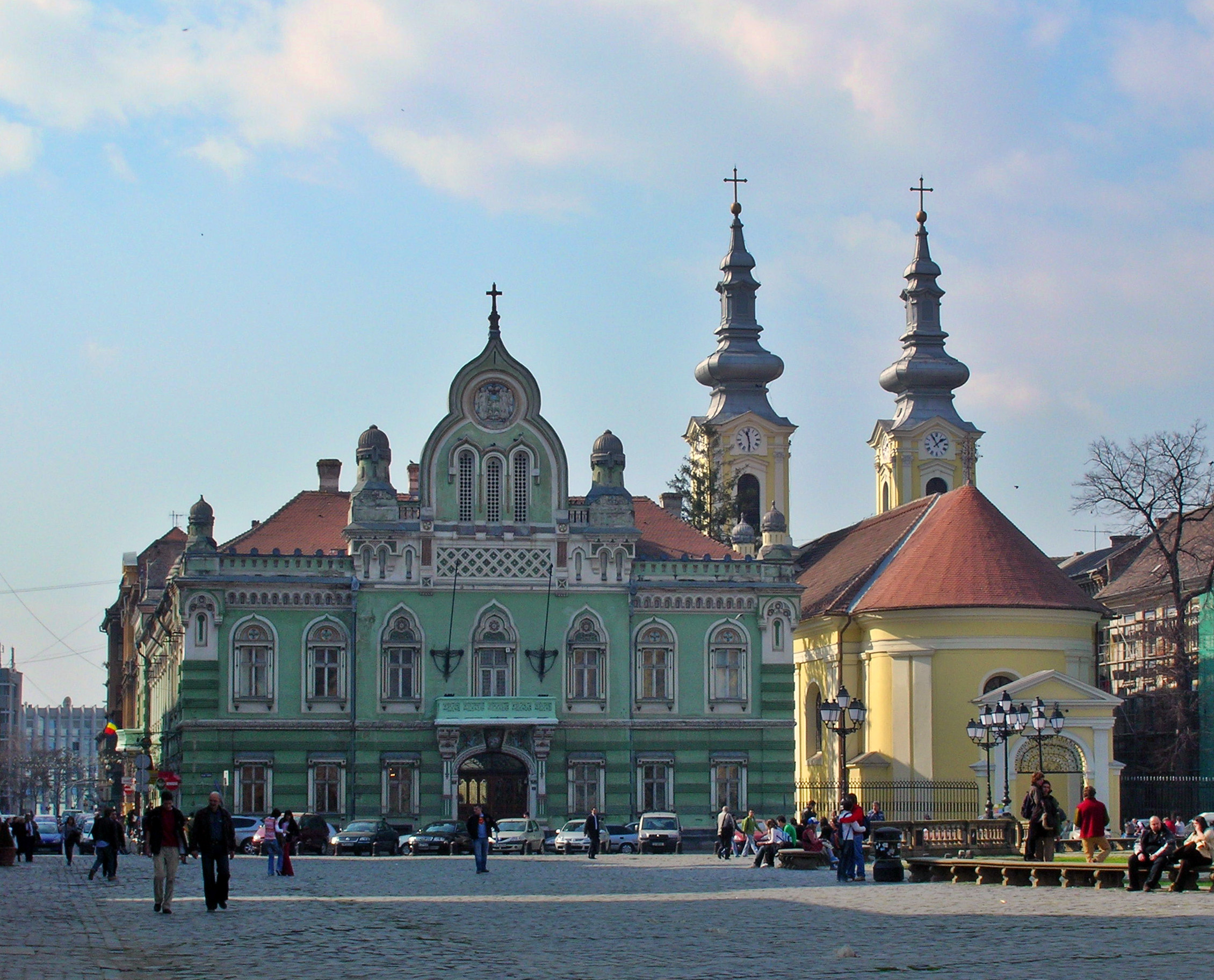
- Serbian Orthodox Bishop's Palace and Serbian Orthodox Cathedral of the Ascension of the Lord in Timișoara

Total population
- 12,026 (2021)

Regions with significant populations
- Timiș, Arad, Caraș-Severin, Mehedinți

Languages
- Romanian and Serbian

Religion
- Eastern Orthodoxy (Serbian Orthodox Church)

Serbs are a recognized ethnic minority in Romania. According to data from the 2021 census, the population of ethnic Serbs in Romania is 12,026, constituting 0.06% of the total population. They are mainly concentrated in the Romanian part of the Banat region where they have a long-standing historical presence and have had an important influence throughout its history.

== History ==
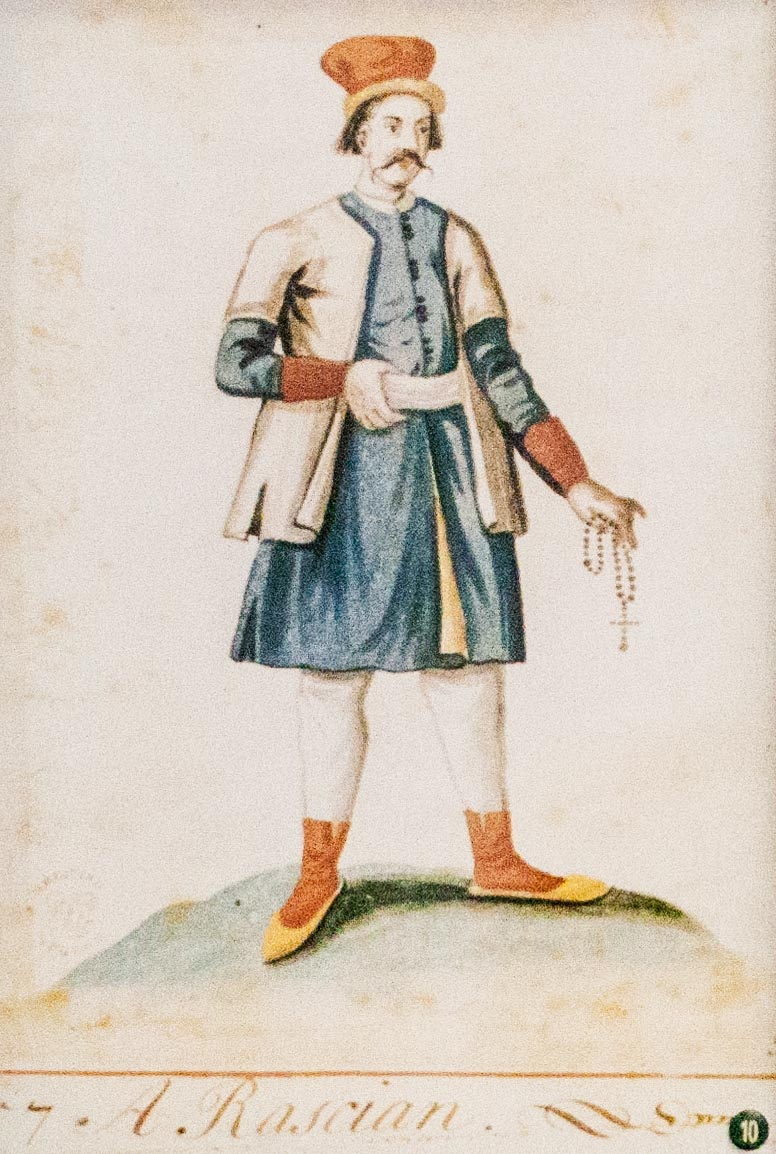
Transylvanian Serb, 18th century

From the late 14th century to the beginning of the 16th century a significant number of Serbs lived in Wallachia and Moldavia. Following Ottoman expansion in the 15th century, Serb mass migrations ensued into Pannonian Basin primarily to the territories of present-day Serbian province of Vojvodina, but also to Hungary and Romania. Serbian Orthodox monasteries began to be built in the area of today's western Romania as early as 15th century, including Kusić and Senđurađ (built by despot Jovan Branković), and in the 16th century including Bezdin and Hodoș-Bodrog Monastery (built by the Jakšić family). During the Ottoman administration of Banat, the area saw new waves of Serbs settling there and constituting a significant portion of the population. Some thirty Serbian Orthodox monasteries were built within the administrative unit Temeşvar Eyalet. In some historical sources, the Banat region during Ottoman rule was referred to as Rascia, a historical term for Serbs. Famous Ottoman historical figures from the area, such as Osman Ağa of Temeşvar was of Serbian descent.

The Serb Uprising in Banat in 1594 against the Ottomans in Temeşvar Eyalet, included territories that are part of present-day Romania. The uprising came as a result of Ottoman tax system of devshirme, where male children from Serb families were taken as part of taxes and were forcibly converted to Islam and made to serve as janissaries. There were reprisals, contemporary sources speaking of "the living envied the dead". After the crushing of the uprising in Banat, many Serbs migrated to Transylvania under the leadership of Bishop Teodor; the territory towards Ineu and Teiuș was settled, where Serbs had already lived, building churches as well as opening schools and printing houses.

Serbs probably constituted the vast majority of mercenary troops known as seimeni, given that their nucleus is attested to have been formed by "Serb seimeni" (as it was during their revolt in 1655), and that the rule of Prince Matei Basarab had witnessed the arrival of a large group of Serb refugees.

Three well-known Orthodox hierarchs came from the Branković family from Ineu: Sava I, of Lipova and Ienopole (at the beginning of the 17th century), Longin of Ienopole (1628-after 1645) and Sava II, the metropolitan of Transylvania at Alba Iulia (1656-1683). They assumed the role of leaders of the Serbian and Romanian Orthodox population and defended them against Catholics and Evangelicals, stoically enduring Catholic and Calvinist persecutions. Earlier, the despot Đorđe Branković renounced his title and domains and, being ordained as a monk with the name Maksim, moved to Wallachia at the call of the ruler and became metropolitan. In Târgovişte he opens the first printing house in Romania, where the Serbian monk Makarije worked, later also Dimitrije Ljubavić. Metropolitans Sava II and Maksim were canonized by both the Romanian and Serbian Orthodox churches.

Joseph of Timișoara was metropolitan of Timisoara in 1643, respectively between 1648-1656. Joseph was born in Ragusa, later moving to the Banat Partoș Monastery. Joseph came to Banat during Ottoman rule to shepherd Romanian and Serbian Orthodox Christians, as both groups at that time fell under the Serbian Patriarchate of Peć. Shortly after his death he was proclaimed a saint. He was canonized by the Romanian and Serbian Orthodox Churches as Saint Joseph the New from Partoş. His relics are found in the Timișoara Orthodox Cathedral.

After defeating the Ottoman Turks and ending Ottoman rule, resulting in the Treaty of Karlowitz of 1699, southern Crișana (i.e. northern Pomorišje) was ceded to the Habsburg monarchy, and, between 1702 and 1751, it was part of the Tisa-Mureș (Potisje-Pomorišje) section of the Habsburg Military Frontier. During this period, the Serb population in the region was still significant: the area between Szeged and Arad was mainly populated by Serbs, while area in the east of Arad mainly by Romanians. In 1720, the population of Arad, the main city in the region, numbered 177 Romanian, 162 Serbian, and 35 Hungarian families.

The Great Migrations of the Serbs in 1690 and 1737–39 led to additional Serb settlement in present-day Romania.

The Habsburg administrative unit of Voivodeship of Serbia and Banat of Temeschwar which existed from 1849 to 1860, had its seat in Timișoara. However, the share of Serbs (less than a third of the total population) and the marginal position of local authorities in the territory of the entire Habsburg Monarchy did not meet the aspirations of the Serb community, so its abolition did not mean anything new for the existence of Serbs in Banat. At this time, the Serbian Gymnasium in Timișoara was founded.

In the late 19th century and the beginning of 20th century, was period of a rapid economic development of Banat, including Timisoara. The development of Timisoara and the growth of its population reduced the share and importance of the Serb community in the city.

At the end of the World War I, in November 1918, the Serbian Army entered most of Banat. From November 1918 to March 1919, western and central parts of Banat were governed by Serbian administration from Novi Sad, as part of the Banat, Bačka and Baranja province of the Kingdom of Serbia and newly formed Kingdom of Serbs, Croats, and Slovenes. However, at the Paris Peace Conference, Kingdom of Serbs, Croats, and Slovenes failed to preserve the central and eastern part of Banat with Timisoara as its center, and it was handed over to Romania in 1919. A particularly difficult issue during the peace conference was the position of the Banat Gorge, inhabited mainly by Serbs. However, after the demarcation, approximately the same number of Serbs and Romanians remained on both sides of the border - about 60 thousand, respectively.

The position of Serbs in the Kingdom of Romania in the interwar period was good: Serb newspapers were founded, cultural and educational institutions were established as well. Even under Ion Antonescu's fascist dictatorship during World War II, the situation of the Serbs remained tolerable.

The post-war friendly relations between the communist states of Romania and Yugoslavia had at first a positive impact on the Serb minority. However, as a result of Tito–Stalin split in 1948, began the difficult period for Serbs in Romania, which at that time was a "satellite" of the Soviet Union. There were large-scale deportations of Serbs to the Bărăgan Plain, and the suppression of cultural and religious life. After the re-establishment of good neighborly relations in 1956, the position of the Serb minority improved somewhat, but it still remained rather difficult. The closure of Serb schools and cultural institutions as well as the "silent" assimilation, contributed to the decline of the Serb population. Numerous settlements with a Serb majority, especially around Timisoara, became majority Romanian during this period. In 1990, there were half as many Serbs as there were 50 years before. Numerous settlements with a Serbian majority, especially around Timisoara, became majority Romanian.

== Demographics ==
According to data from the 2021 census, 12,026 people in Romania identified as ethnic Serbs.

The vast majority of Serbs live in about sixty localities in the western and southwestern part of Romania, starting with the towns of Pecica and Nădlac and the city of Arad on the north-side of Mures river, all the way to the commune of Sviniţa located on the Danube along the border with Serbia. The number of Serbs is constantly decreasing, it has decreased by three times in last hundred years: according to the statistics of the Serbian Orthodox Eparchy of Timisoara, there were 44,078 Serbs in Romania in 1924.

The following municipalities had a Serb population greater than 1% according to the 2021 census (placenames in Serbian are included in brackets):

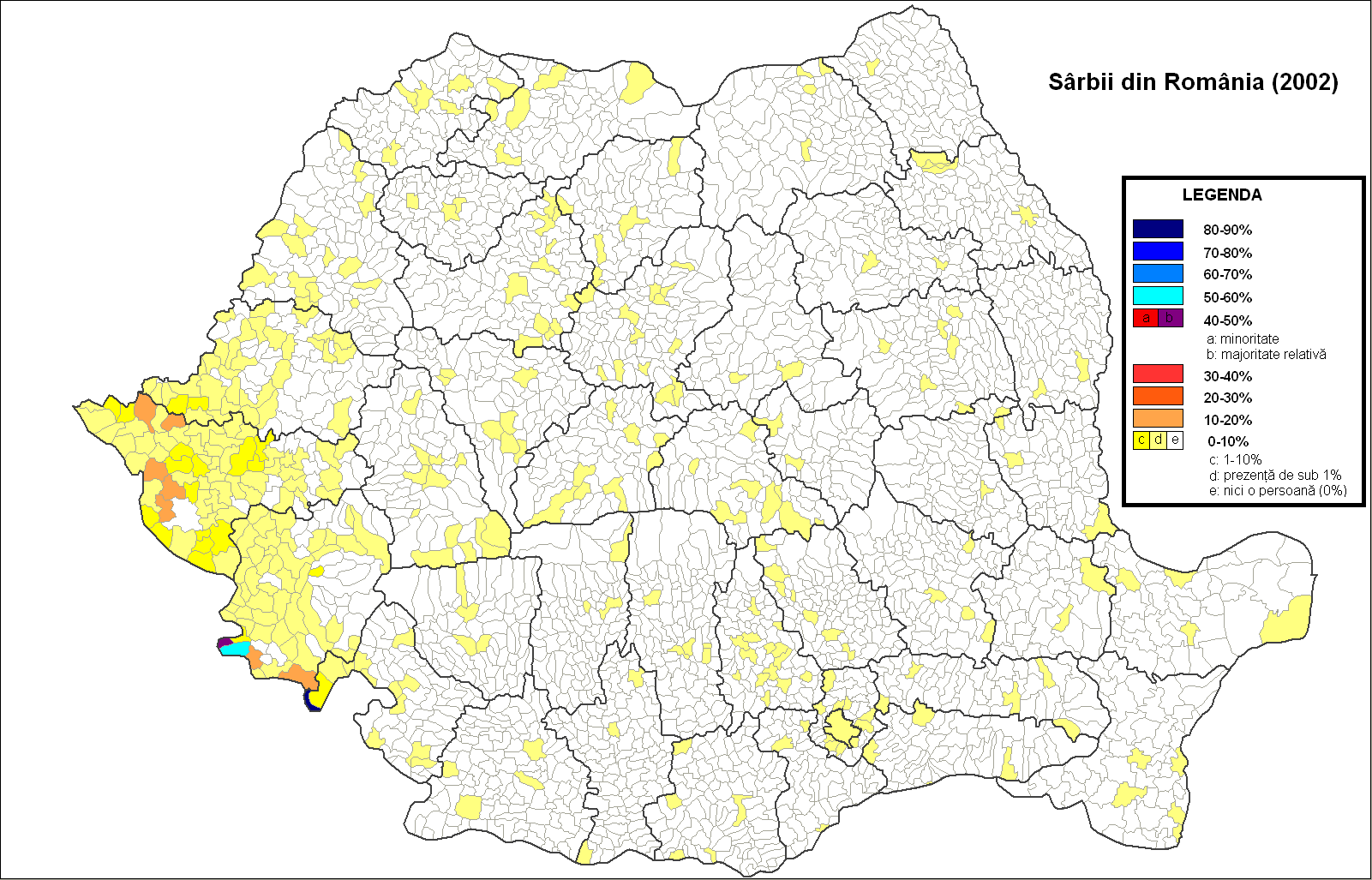
Distribution of Serbs in Romania, 2002 census

Municipality	County	Population	Share
Svinița (Свињица/Svinjica)	Mehedinți	651	87.8%
Pojejena (Пожежена/Požežena)	Caraș-Severin	1,003	40.3%
Socol (Соколовац/Sokolovac)	Caraș-Severin	615	38.4%
Berzasca (Берзаска/Berzaska)	Caraș-Severin	389	18.2%
Sânpetru Mare (Велики Семпетар/Veliki Sempetar)	Timiş	405	15.1%
Cenei (Ченеј/Čenej)	Timiş	345	12.5%
Naidăș (Најдаш/Najdaš)	Caraș-Severin	107	11.3%
Moldova Nouă (Нова Молдава/Nova Moldava)	Caraș-Severin	989	10.6%
Peciu Nou (Улбеч/Ulbeč)	Timiş	413	8.4%
Variaș (Варјаш/Varjaš)	Timiş	341	6.4%
Băleni (Baleni/Baleni)	Dâmbovița	445	5.7%
Foeni (Фењ/Fenj)	Timiş	80	5.3%
Cenad (Чанад/Čanad)	Timiş	162	4.6%
Giera (Ђир/Đir)	Timiş	46	4%
Denta (Дента/Denta)	Timiş	94	3.3%
Deta (Дета/Deta)	Timiş	190	3.3%
Saravale (Саравола/Saravola)	Timiş	86	3.3%
Giulvăz (Ђулвез/Đulvez)	Timiş	99	3.2%
Topolovățu Mare (Велики Тополовац/Veliki Topolovac)	Timiş	78	3%
Felnac (Фелнак/Felnak)	Arad	77	2.6%
Sânnicolau Mare (Велики Семиклуш/Veliki Semikluš)	Timiş	252	2.3%
Birda (Бирда/Birda)	Timiş	43	2.3%
Becicherecu Mic (Мали Бечкерек/Mali Bečkerek)	Timiş	53	1.8%
Recaș (Рекаш/Rekaš)	Timiş	147	1.7%
Secusigiu (Секусић/Sekusić)	Arad	90	1.6%
Parța (Парац/Parac)	Timiş	29	1.2%
Timișoara (Темишвар/Temišvar)	Timiş	2,776	1.1%
Săcălaz (Секелаз/Sekelaz)	Timiş	99	1%
Checea (Чека/Čeka)	Timiş	24	1%

Serbs in Romania belong to the Eastern Orthodoxy with the Serbian Orthodox Church as the traditional church (through its diocese, the Eparchy of Timișoara).

== Heritage ==
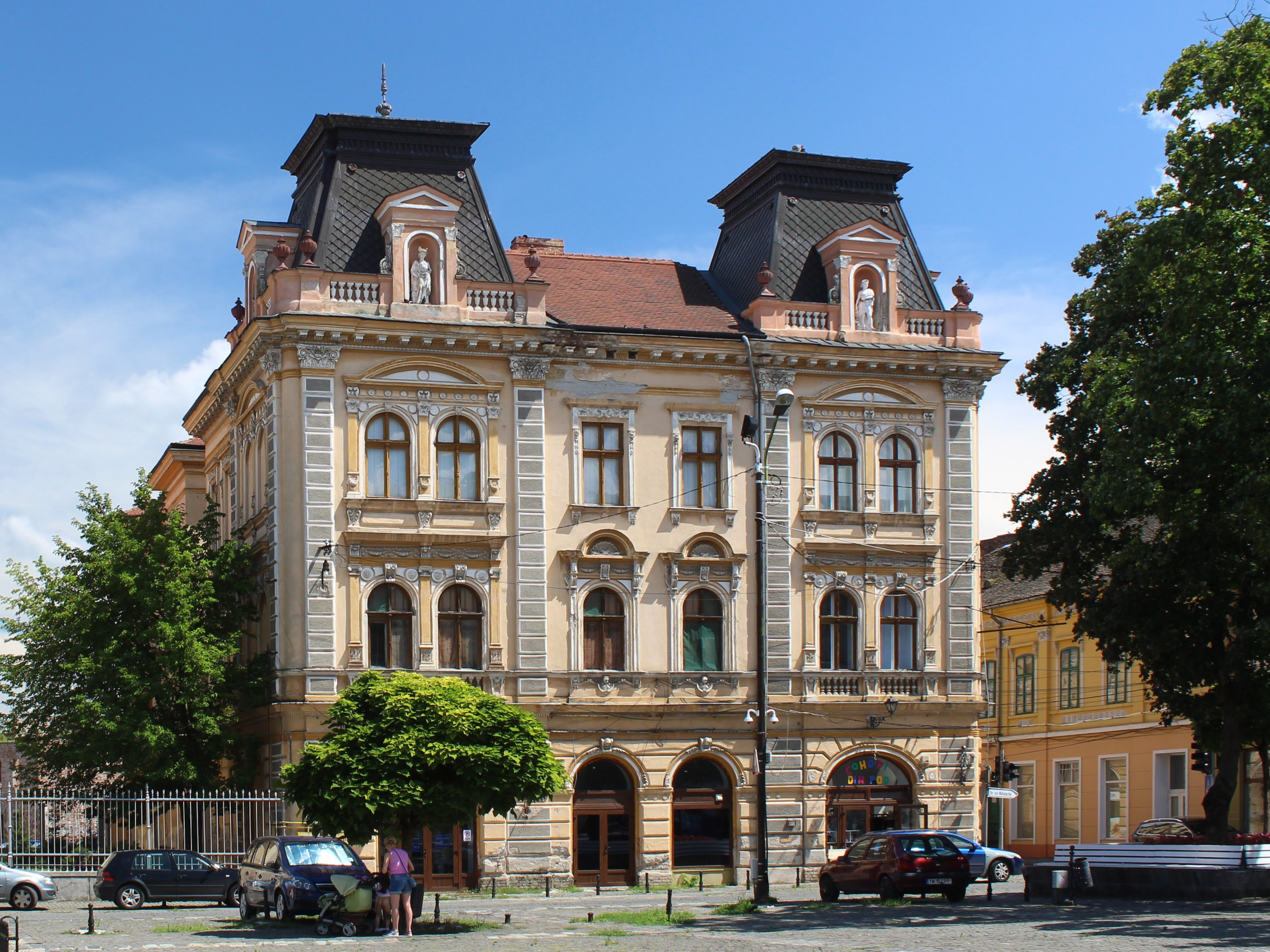
House of the Serb Community in Timișoara

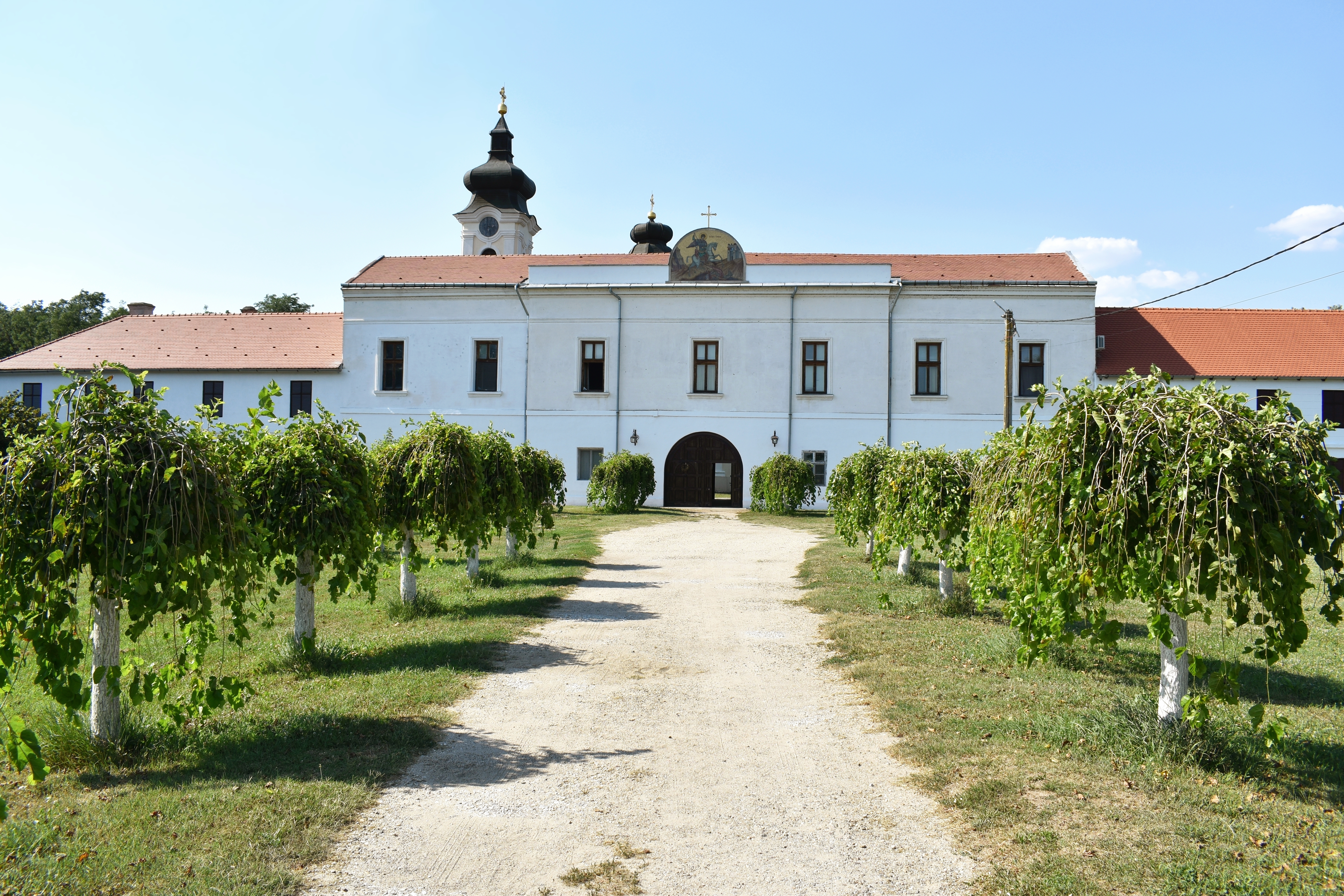
Sveti Đurađ Monastery

The Serbs has left a rich heritage, especially orthodox churches and monasteries in Banat and in southern Crișana.

Serbian Orthodox churches are to be found in following cities and towns: Timișoara (tree churches), Arad (two churches), and at least one town church in Reșița, Lugoj, Ineu, Buziaș, Sânnicolau Mare, Pecica, Nădlac, Ciacova, Jimbolia, Orșova, Moldova Nouă, Deta, and Oravița. Serbian Orthodox village churches are in Cenad (Нађчанад/Nađčanad), Variaș (Варјаш/Varjaš), Felnac (Фелнак/Felnak), Turnu (Torno/Торња), Moravița (Моравица/Moravica), Brestovăț (Брестовац/Brestovac), Sânpetru Mare (Велики Семпетар/Veliki Sempetar), Peciu Nou (Улбеч/Ulbeč), Cenei (Ченеј/Čenej), Svinița (Свињица/Svinjica), Secusigiu (Секусић/Sekusić), Moldova Veche (Стара Молдава/Stara Moldova), Denta (Дента), Saravale (Саравола/Saravola), Foeni (Фењ/Fenj), Socol (Сокол/Sokol), Baziaș, (Базјаш/Bazjaš), Zlatița (Златица/Zlatica), Pojejena (Пожежена/Požežena), Belobreșca (Белобрешка/Belobreška), Divici (Дивић/Divić), Radimna (Радимна/Radimna), Șușac (Шушка/Šuška), Berzasca (Берзаска/Berzaska), Dejan (Дејан/Dejan) and Sânmartinu Maghiar (Мађарски Семартон/Mađarski Semarton). There are seven Serbian Orthodox monasteries in Romania: Sveti Đurađ monastery, Bazjaš monastery, Bezdin monastery, Šemljug monastery, Sveti Simeon monastery, Zlatica monastery, and Kusić monastery.

== Notable people ==
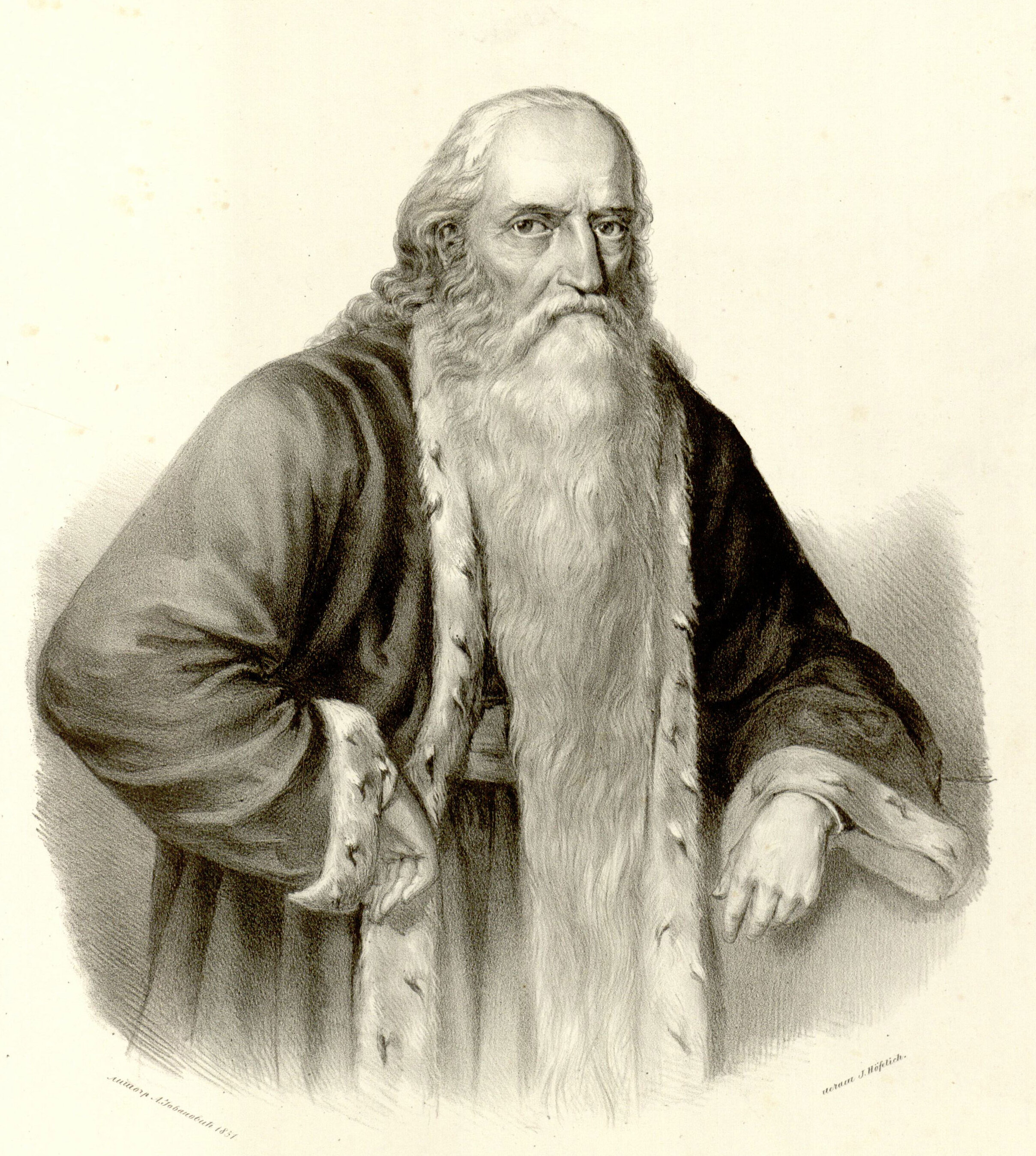
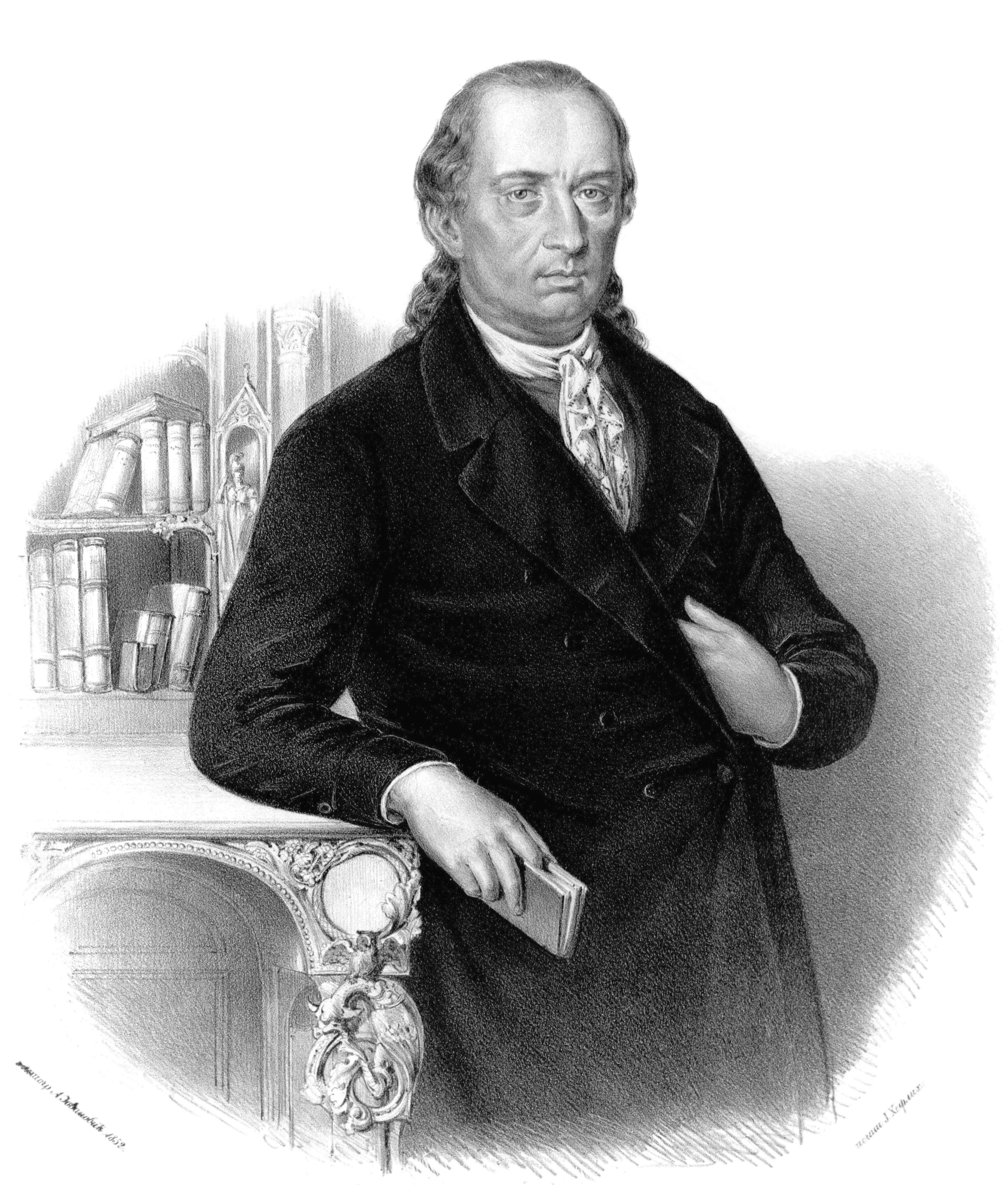
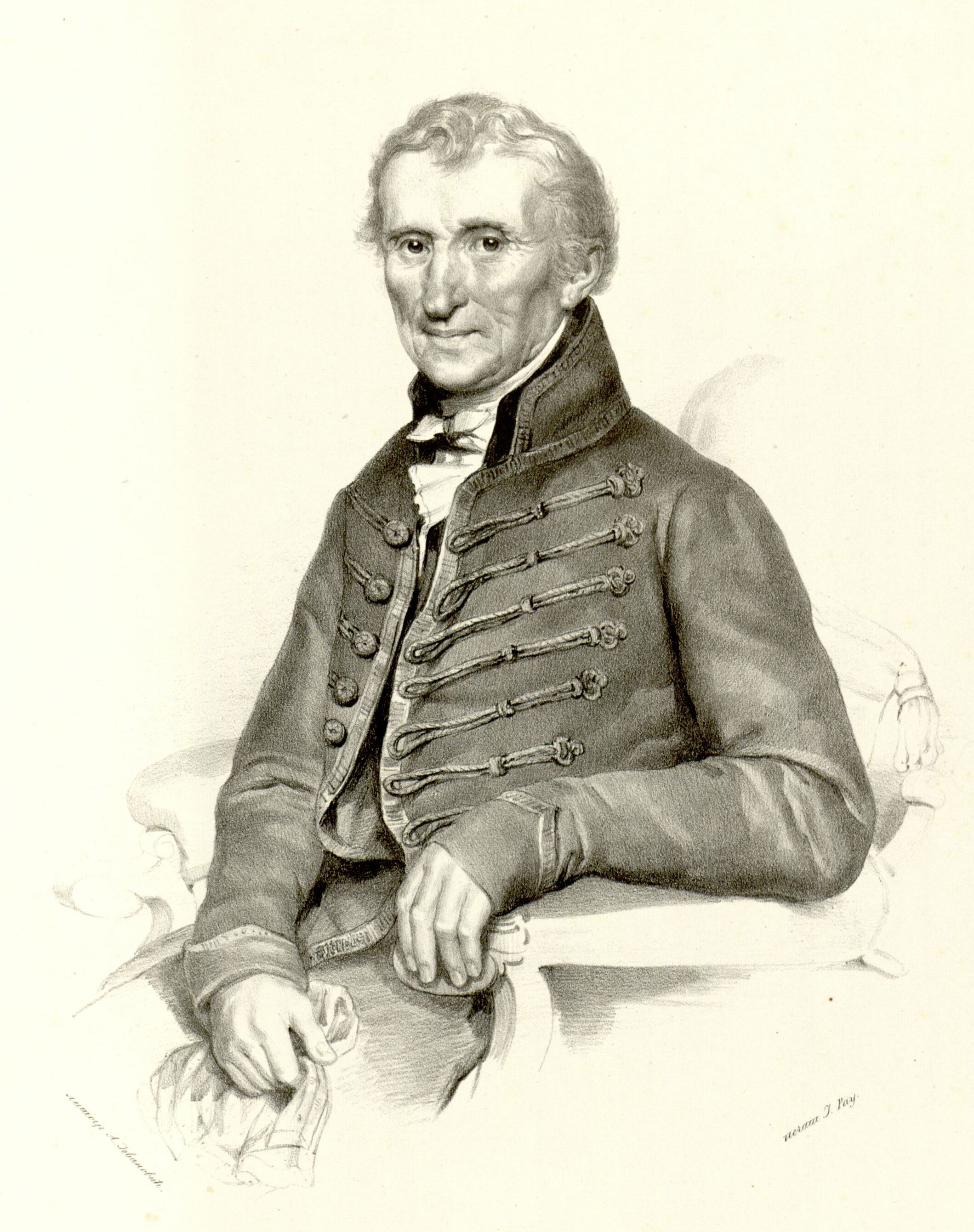
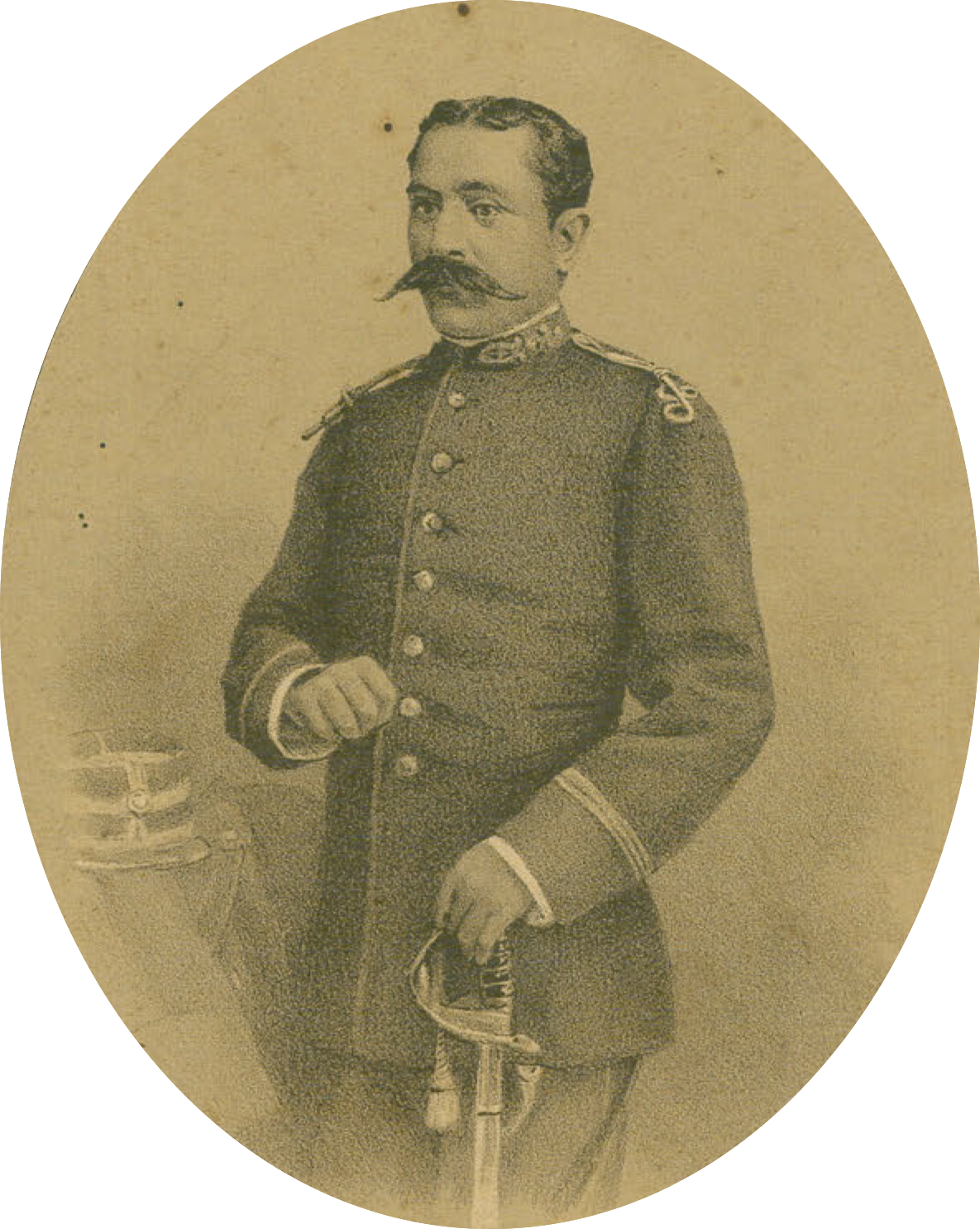
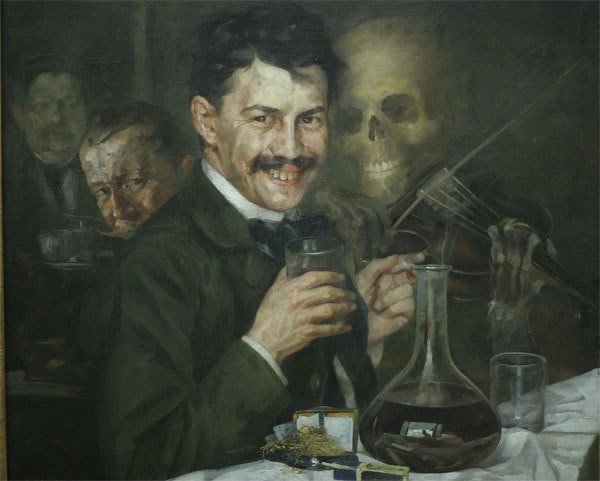
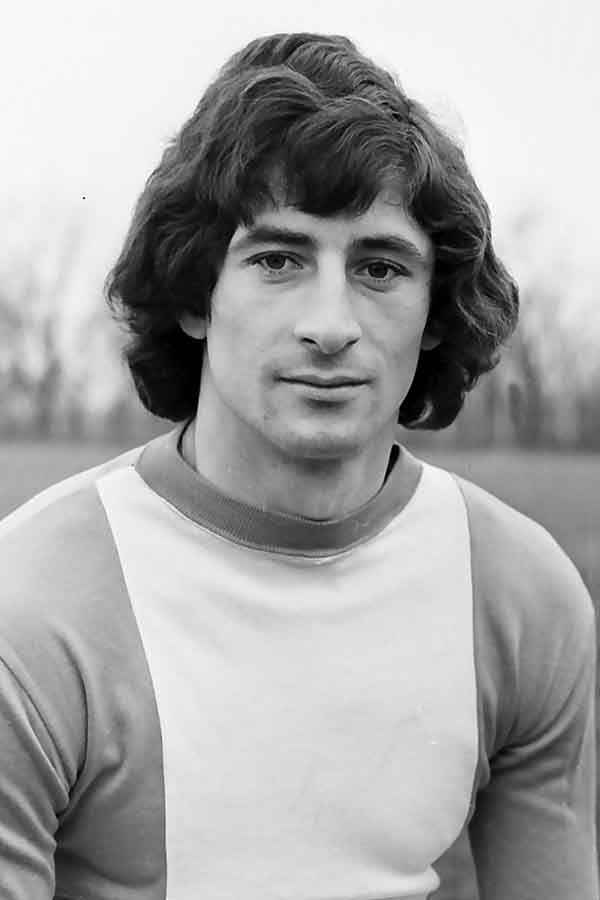
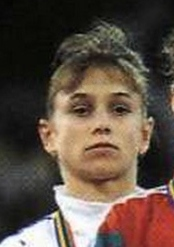
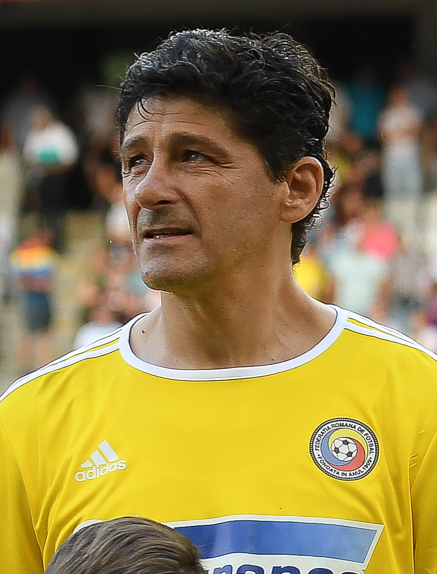
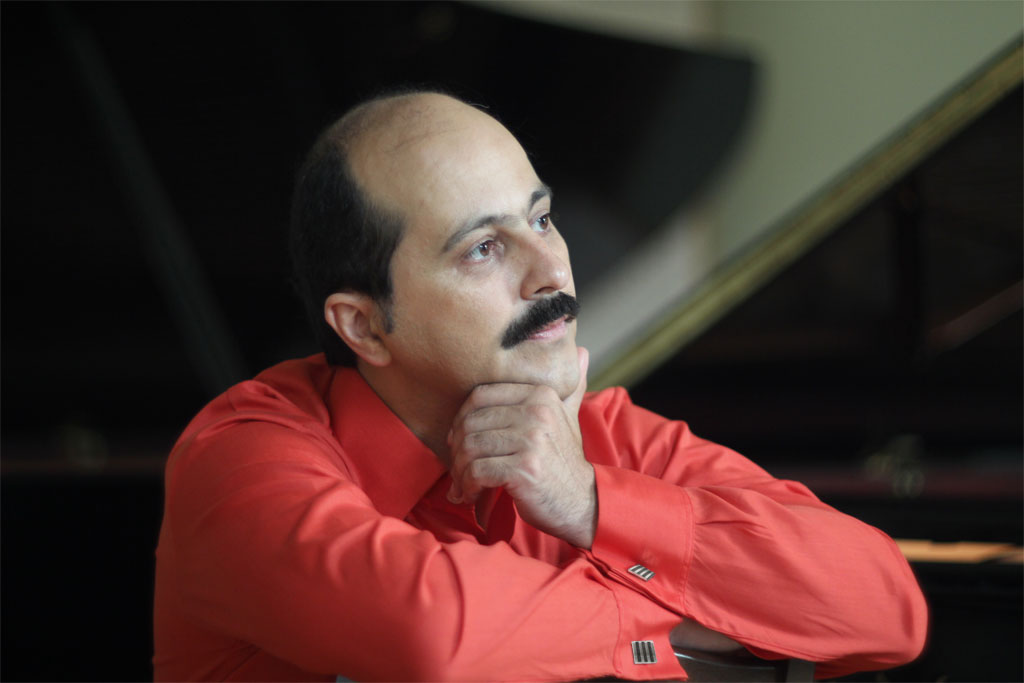
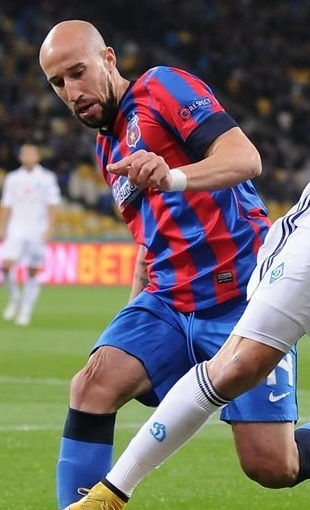
Đоrđe Branković	Dositej Obradović	Sava Tekelija	Ion Ivanovici	Stevan Aleksić	Cornel Dinu	Lavinia Miloșovici	Miodrag Belodedici	Andrei Ivanovitch	Iasmin Latovlevici

- Slavoliub Adnagi – politician
- Stevan Aleksic – painter
- Miodrag Belodedici – football player
- Đorđe Branković – diplomat
- Sava II Branković – orthodox priest and saint
- Konstantin Danil – painter
- Cornel Dinu – football player, maternal Serb descent
- Milica Despina of Wallachia – princess consort of Wallachia
- Slavomir Gvozdenovici – writer, poet, and politician
- Jovan Hadži – zoologist
- Dimitrie Eustatievici – philologist, scholar, and pedagogue
- Andrei Ivanovitch – pianist
- Ion Ivanovici – conductor and composer
- Aleksa Janković – politician, Prime Minister of Serbia
- Jovan Nenad – general and self-proclaimed "emperor"
- Iasmin Latovlevici – football player
- Srdjan Luchin – football player
- Alexandru Macedonski – poet, novelist, and literary critic, paternal Serb descent
- Lavinia Miloșovici – gymnast
- Dositej Obradović – writer and linguist
- Osman Ağa of Temeşvar – Ottoman military figure
- Pavel Petrović – painter
- Péter Petrovics – protestant noble, Ban of Lugos and Karánsebes
- Emil Petrovici – linguist
- Pera Segedinac – military figure
- Danilo Stefanović – politician, Prime Minister of Serbia
- Ivan Tabaković – painter
- Peter Tekeli – general-in-chief of the Russian Imperial Army
- Sava Tekelija – jurist and philanthropist
- Sava Temišvarac – military commander
- Stefan Tenecki – icon painter

== See also ==
- Romania–Serbia relations
- Eparchy of Timișoara
