= Klisura (Višegrad) =

- Village
- Location within Bosnia and Herzegovina
- Coordinates: 43°47′12″N 19°08′23″E
- Country: Bosnia and Herzegovina
- Entity: Republika Srpska
- Municipality: Višegrad
- Time zone: UTC+1 (CET)
  - Summer (DST): UTC+2 (CEST)

Klisura (Serbian: Клисура) is a village in the municipality of Višegrad, Bosnia and Herzegovina.
