= Sveti Đurađ monastery =

Serbian Orthodox monastery in Birda, Romania

Sveti Đurađ Monastery
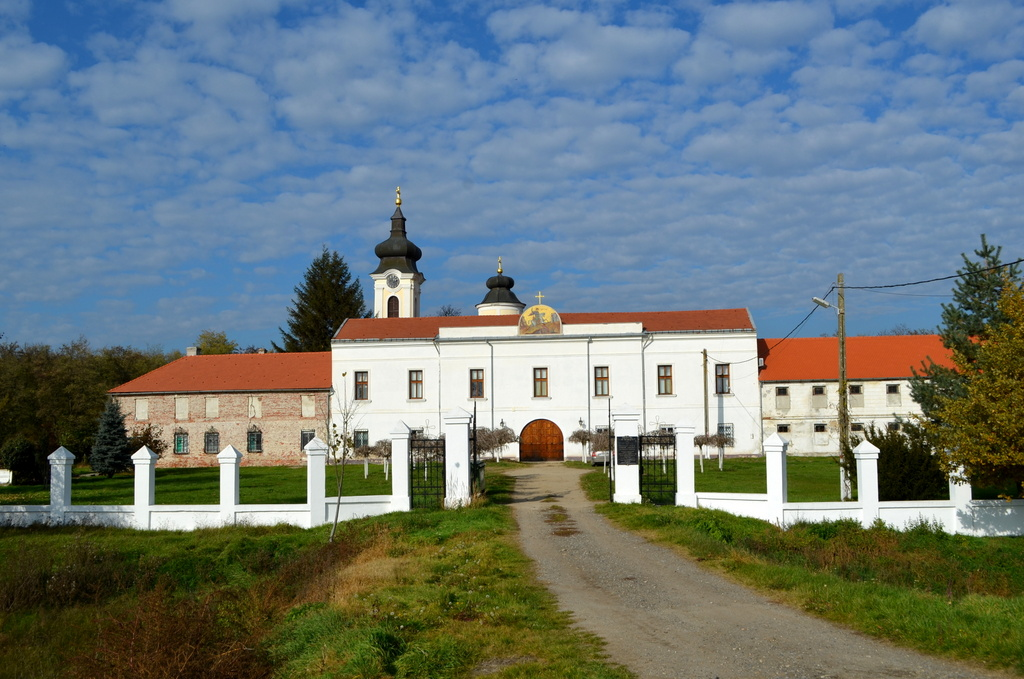
- Interactive map of Sveti Đurađ Monastery

Monastery information
- Denomination: Serbian Orthodox Church
- Established: 1485
- Dedication: Saint George
- Diocese: Eparchy of Temišvar

People
- Founder: Jovan Branković
- Abbot: Nikon Korićanac

Architecture
- Style: Serbian Baroque
- Completion date: 1794

Site
- Location: Mânăstire (Birda), Timiș County
- Country: Romania
- Coordinates: 45.4111548°N 21.3358361°E

Sveti Đurađ Monastery or Saint George Monastery (Serbian: Манастир Свети Ђурађ; Romanian: Mănăstirea Sfântul Gheorghe) is a medieval Serbian Orthodox monastery located in Mânăstire, Timiș County, Romania, 20 km from the Romanian-Serbian border. It was established in 1485 by Serbian despot Jovan Branković; the present buildings date to 1794, built by Iguman Augustin Petrović as a school and monastic church.

Services are held in Serbian and Old Church Slavonic. The last resident of the monastery, Sister Evgenija, died in 2020. Among the relics that the monastic church houses is a fragment of the skull of Saint George, brought here in the 15th century by Đorđe Branković, and a piece of the chain with which Saint Peter was bound.

The monastery is listed as a historic monument by Romania's Ministry of Culture. The monastic church and the monks' cells are given as separate entries.

== History ==
Legend has it that the monastery was founded during the Iconoclastic movement, under Empress Irene and her son Constantine, at the end of the 8th century, but it is much more likely that it was founded much later, in the medieval era.

In the second half of the 15th century, the Serbian despot Đorđe Branković asked the sovereign pontiff for permission to build 12 monasteries on the territory of the Hungarian kingdom. This monastery was built by Jovan Branković, his son.

After 1944, the monastery became a barracks for a while, then an office building for the agricultural production cooperative in the village. In the 1980s, the workers of Comtim, a local pork producer, were housed here. It was also used as a feed store. It became monastery again only after 1990.

== Architecture ==
The first church was erected in 1485. It was built of burnt brick in the Serbo-Byzantine style with a cruciform base, a dome and a separate bell tower. It lasted until 1794 when the current church was built, which preserved the foundations of the Serbo-Byzantine style to which Baroque elements were added. The iconostasis is sumptuous, gilded, the interior decoration being representative of the Serbian Baroque. It was painted by Jovan Isailović, and the painting on the walls was executed by a certain Pavle Đurđev, a resident of the monastic estates.

== Gallery ==
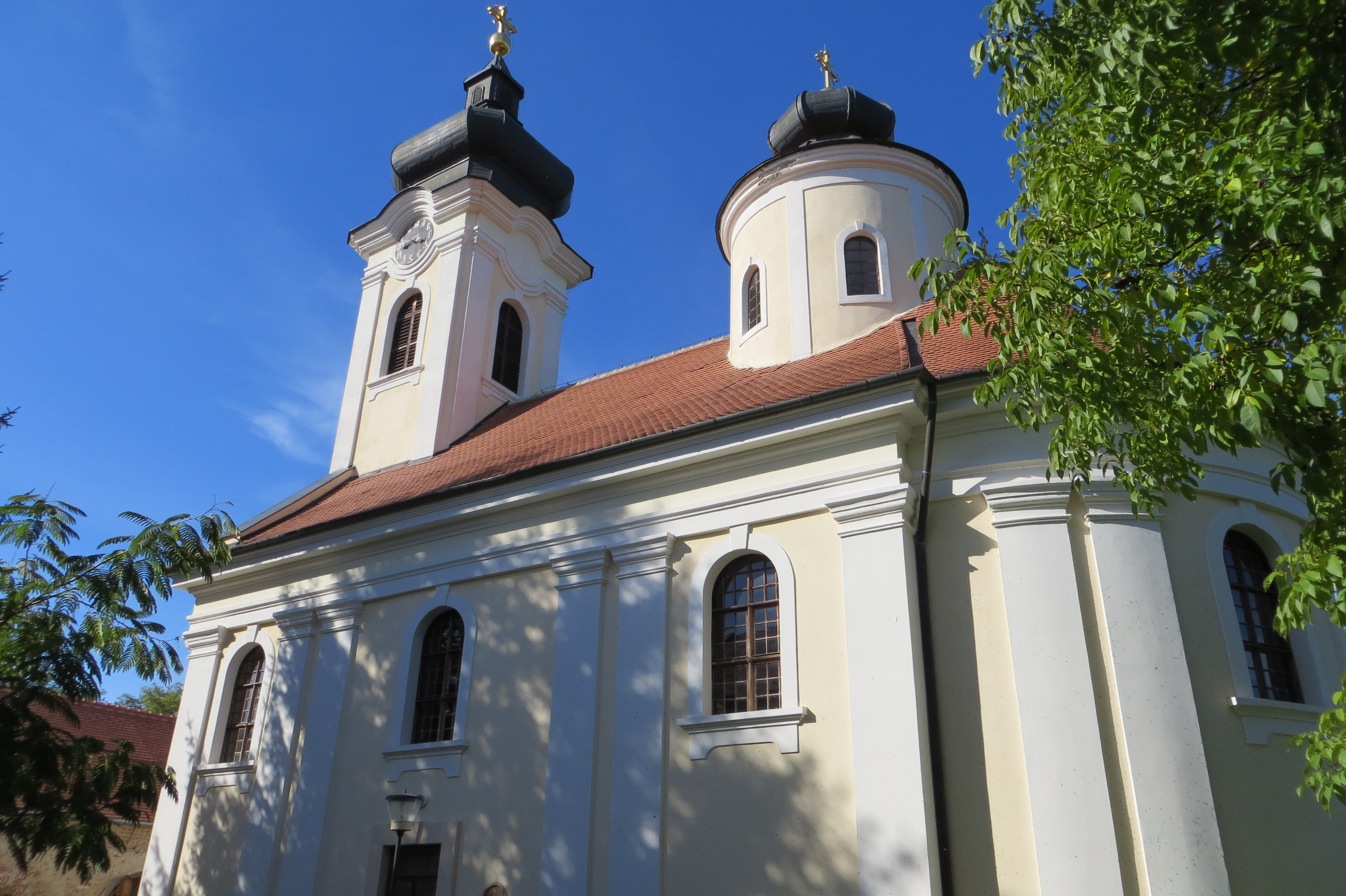
Monastery church

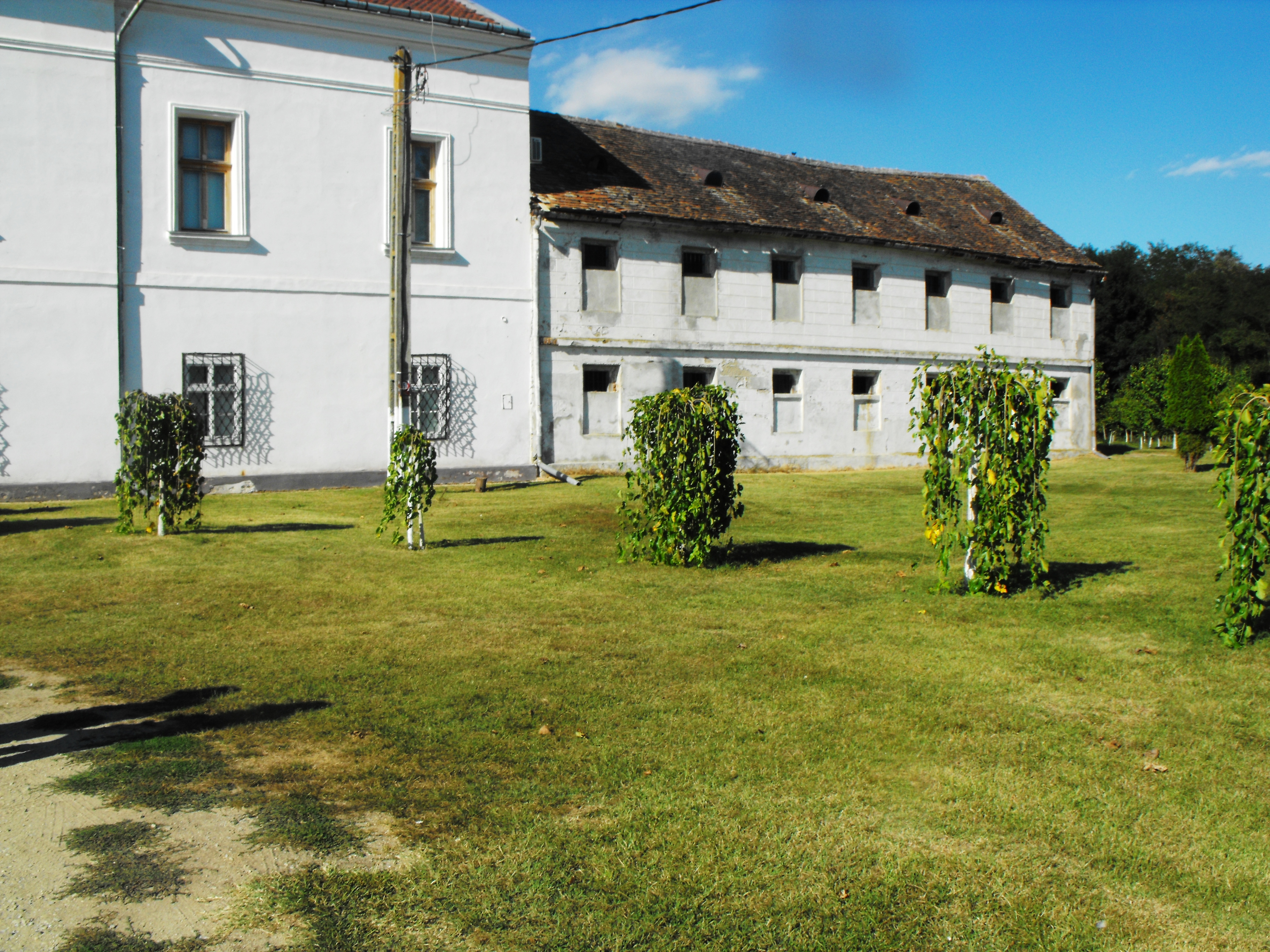
Monks' cells

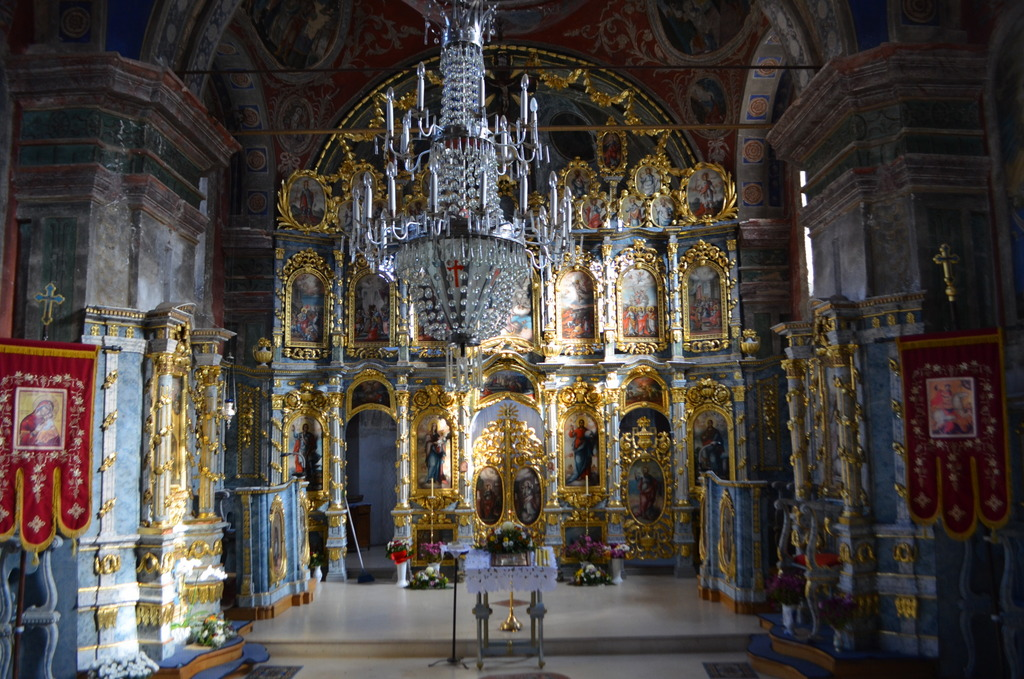
Iconostasis

== See also ==
- List of Serbian Orthodox monasteries
- Eparchy of Timișoara
- Serbs of Romania
