= Kleisoura =

Kleisoura (Greek: Κλεισούρα, "enclosure" or "pass") may refer to:

- Kleisoura (Byzantine district), a Byzantine military frontier province
- Kleisoura, Kastoria, a village and a municipality in Kastoria regional unit, Greece
  - Battle of Kleisoura Pass, April 1941
- Kleisoura, Larissa, a village and a municipality in Larissa regional unit, Greece
- Kleisoura, Preveza, a village in the municipal unit of Filippiada, Preveza regional unit, Greece
- Kleisoura, the Greek name for Këlcyrë, a town and mountain pass in southern Albania
  - Capture of Klisura Pass, January 1941

== See also ==
- Klisura (disambiguation)
