= Church of Saint Nicholas, Timișoara =

Serbian Orthodox church in Timișoara, Romania

Church of Saint Nicholas
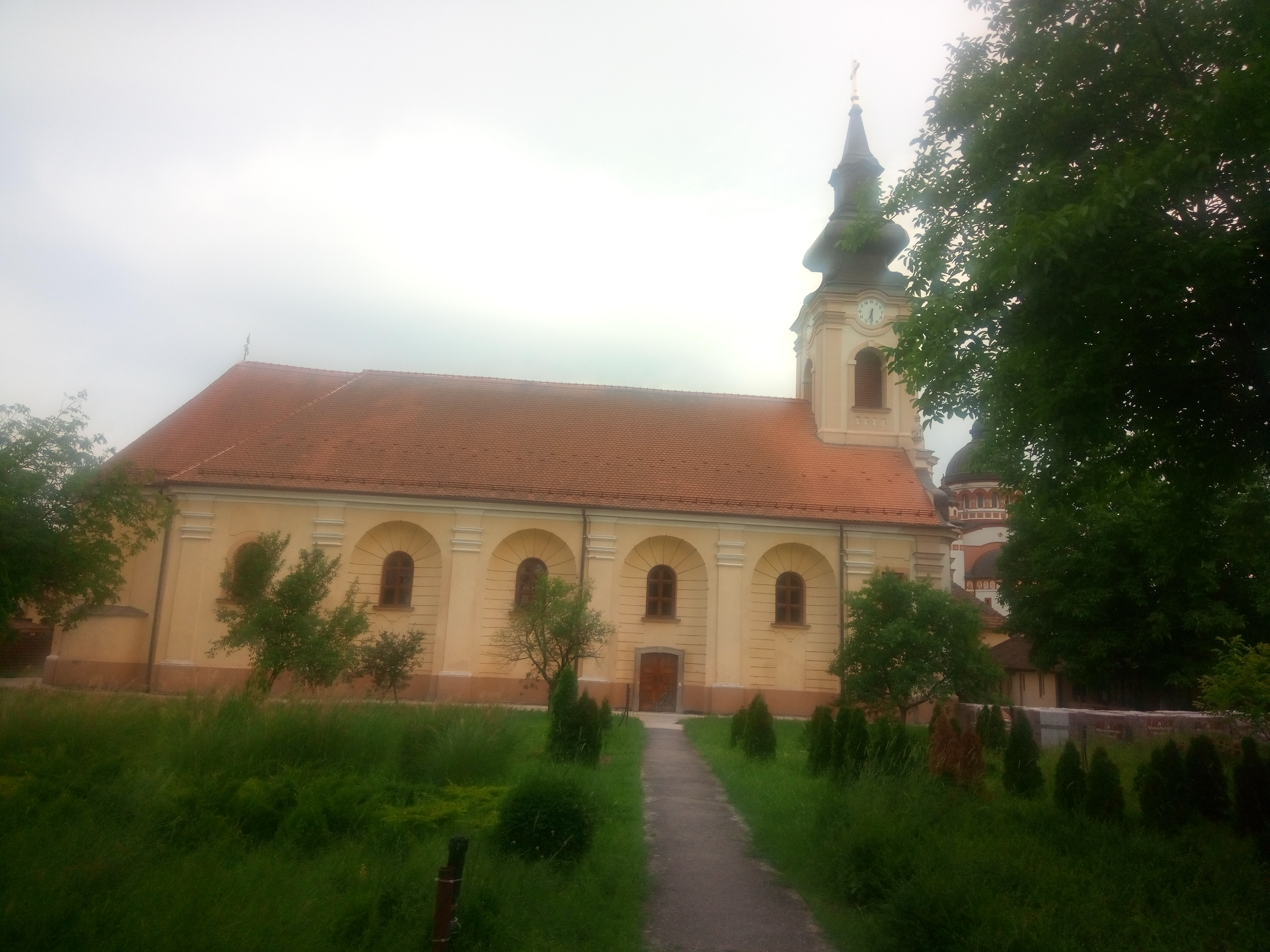

Religion
- Affiliation: Serbian Orthodox Church
- Patron: Saint Nicholas
- Status: Active

Location
- Location: 13 Avram Iancu Square, Timișoara
- Interactive map of Church of Saint Nicholas
- Coordinates: 45°45′56″N 21°12′26″E

Architecture
- Style: Baroque
- Groundbreaking: 1786
- Completed: 1793

Specifications
- Length: 37.75 m
- Width: 9.5 m
- Materials: Brick

The Church of Saint Nicholas (Romanian: Biserica sârbească „Sf. Nicolae”; Serbian: Црква Светог Николe, romanized: Crkva svetog Nikole) is an Eastern Orthodox church located in the Mehala district of Timișoara, Romania. It is under jurisdiction of the Eparchy of Timișoara of the Serbian Orthodox Church.

There are two other churches in this square, the Romanian Orthodox Church of the Ascension and the Roman Catholic Church of St. Mary. The Church of Saint Nicholas is together with the Serbian Orthodox Cathedral of the Ascension of the Lord, Timișoara in Cetate's Union Square and the Church of Saint George in Fabric's Trajan Square one of the three Serbian Orthodox churches in the city.

== History ==
The first settlers of Mehala, the Serbs, belonged to the Orthodox religious community. In 1744 they founded their then joint Serbian-Romanian parish. The St. Nicholas Church is the oldest documented building of the Mehala district and was built of brick between 1786 and 1793. Its tower houses an old clock mechanism and five bells. In the 19th century, the interior carpentry and the iconostasis were executed. The chairs were made by Gheorghe Liblaitner, the furniture of the iconostasis by Mihajlo Janić, and the icons are the work of the painter Sava Petrović. The painting of the interior walls was done by Nicolae Alexici. The church saw gun firing during the Hungarian Revolution of 1848 and was later used as an animal shelter for six months. It was rehabilitated in 1870 from donations from parishioners. In 1887 the Orthodox parish split into a Romanian and a Serbian denomination, and the church was given to the Serbian Orthodox believers. The Romanian Orthodox believers built their own church in Avram Iancu Square, which had to be replaced after 25 years due to dilapidation. At the same place, in 1925, the foundation stone was laid for the largest building of Mehala, the Romanian Orthodox Church of the Ascension.

The Church of Saint Nicholas has had a huge impact on the Serb community in the area. It once had a denominational school, a football team that played matches in Croatia and Serbia and an active choir called Zora. In the past, each member of the choir wore a special badge.

== Architecture ==
The church's architecture appears somewhat disproportionate. Its nave is unusually long, and the interior forms a cross-shaped plan, with lateral extensions near the soleia and an arched apse at the eastern end. Above the western section, over the soleia, a balcony was constructed for members of choral societies, and above this rises the bell tower, which originally housed five bells and a clock mechanism. These were removed during the Revolution of 1848, melted down for cannon production, and later replaced through the work of local craftsmen.

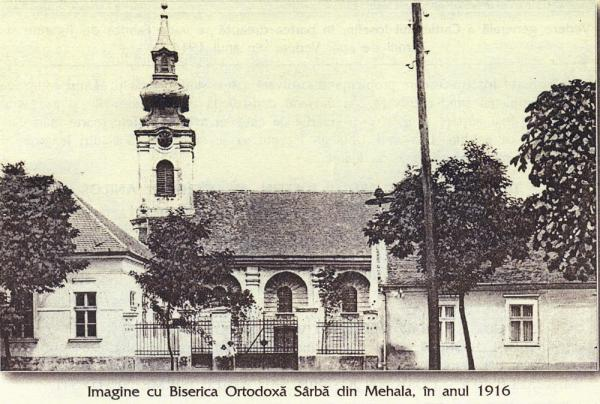
The church in 1916

The church was constructed in accordance with the provincial Baroque style of its period, using durable materials, featuring a vaulted ceiling of baked brick, and covered with roof tiles. It stands at the center of a spacious portico measuring 400 square fathoms, paved with marble and extending 20 fathoms in length, seven fathoms in width, and four fathoms in height to the roof. There is a circular damage on the church vault, which tradition claims dates back to 1848.

The facades are highly decorative, with arched niches separated by pilasters resting on substantial bases. Each pilaster is capped with a capital beneath a profiled cornice. On the northern and southern facades, the lower sections feature segmentally arched, double-leaf wooden doors, intricately carved. In the upper sections, arched windows are positioned along the axes of the niches. The niches are embellished with horizontal grooves, while the upper arched portions display grooves arranged radially. On the northern side, beneath the bell tower, there is a rectangular window framed with a profile, and directly below it lies a profiled banks.

The western facade, which houses the main entrance to the church, is framed by Doric columns supporting a triangular tympanum with profiled edges. The central portion of the bell tower is flanked by blank walls, while pilasters with profiled capitals are positioned at its corners. A double profiled cornice follows the curvature of the clock dial. On the northern side of the bell tower, a single arched window with a profiled frame is present. Beneath each window is a profiled bank, followed by a rectangular panel containing four oval recesses. Above the window zone, clock faces are situated on all four sides of the bell tower. The tower is capped with a wooden lantern covered in sheet metal, topped by a gilded cross.

== See also ==
- Cathedral of the Ascension of the Lord
- Serbian Orthodox Episcopal Palace
- Church of Saint George
- Eparchy of Timișoara
- Serbs of Romania
