= House of the Orthodox Community in Timișoara =

House of the Orthodox Community
- Casa Comunității Ortodoxe
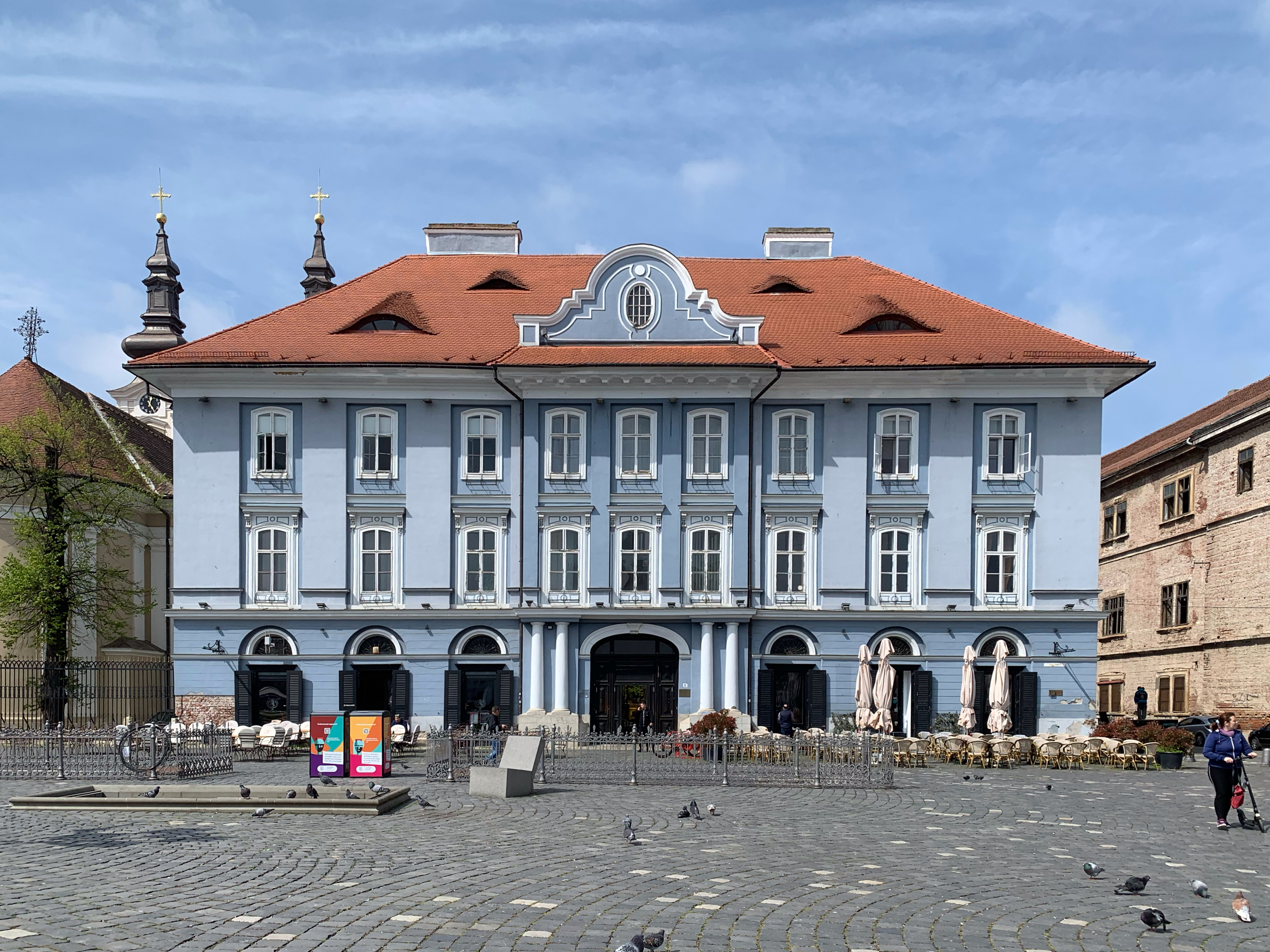
- Interactive map of the House of the Orthodox Community area
- Alternative names: House of the Serbian Community in Cetate

General information
- Architectural style: Baroque
- Location: 5 Union Square, Timișoara, Romania
- Coordinates: 45°45′29″N 21°13′40″E
- Construction started: 1821
- Completed: 1824

The House of the Orthodox Community (Romanian: Casa Comunității Ortodoxe) is a historical building in the Cetate district of Timișoara, Romania.

== History ==
Part of the Serbian complex, along with the Serbian Episcopal Church and the Palace of the Serbian Orthodox Bishopric, the House of the Orthodox Community was built in the first half of the 19th century, between 1821 and 1824. On the site of the current building, there was, according to the plan of the Timișoara fortress from 1752, a building that served the Orthodox community, both Romanian and Serbian. In that area there was also a marshy land, remaining from the former moats of the Turkish fortress. The detailed plan of that building was documented between 1786 and 1788. However, the old building was demolished in 1812, and the current building was built on its site in 1828.

The new two-story building was built in a barracks style, with an interior courtyard, and had apartments for rent. Among the building's famous residents were the Macedo-Romanian baron Duca, the jurist Alexandru Bugarschi, and the Swabian politician Kaspar Muth. Most of the tenants were Orthodox Christians. The ground floor spaces were rented to important companies, with no fewer than nine shops known in 1853. When the Romanian Orthodox Church separated from the Serbian one, the building remained the property of the latter.

== Architecture ==
The building, with a U-shaped plan and the main facade facing Union Square, has a basement, ground floor, and two floors. It is an example of late Baroque architecture, combined with classical influences, typical of urban ensembles from the Habsburg era.

The building's facade is well-proportioned and symmetrically organized, accented by a curved central pediment, decorated with geometric motifs and elements specific to the late Baroque style. The ornaments are intricate yet not overly ornate, highlighting elegance and sophistication. The building's focal point is the curved pediment, which introduces a sense of movement and vertical emphasis. At the center of the pediment is an oculus (circular window), providing a unique decorative touch.
