= Cathedral of the Ascension of the Lord, Timișoara =

Serbian Orthodox cathedral in Timișoara, Romania

Cathedral of the Ascension of the Lord
- Cathedral of the Ascension of the Lord, pictured in 2023
- Cathedral of the Ascension of the Lord
- 45°45′28″N 21°13′39″E
- Location: Timișoara
- Country: Romania
- Denomination: Serbian Orthodox Church

History
- Status: Church
- Dedication: Ascension of the Lord

Architecture
- Functional status: Active
- Style: Baroque

Administration
- Archdiocese: Eparchy of Timișoara

The Cathedral of the Ascension of the Lord (Serbian: Саборна црква Вазнесења Господњег, romanized: Saborna crkva Vaznesenja Gospodnjeg), commonly known as the Serbian Orthodox Cathedral (Romanian: Catedrala Ortodoxă Sârbă), is an Eastern Orthodox church located in Timișoara, Romania. It is under jurisdiction of the Eparchy of Timișoara of the Serbian Orthodox Church and serves as its cathedral church.

Located in the Union Square of Cetate district, right by the Serbian Orthodox Bishop's Palace and the House of the Serb Community, the building is one of the three Serbian Orthodox churches in the city together with the Church of Saint George in Fabric district and the Church of Saint Nicholas in the Avram Iancu Square of Mehala district.

== History ==
In 1737 (according to other sources 1728), during the plague epidemic in the city, the Serbian Orthodox Cathedral that originally stood on this site burned down. The present church was built in Baroque style between 1744 and 1748 by order of the Serbian Orthodox Bishop Georgije Popović. The church was built from the donations of the churchgoers, being made of stone and brick. In order to gain space for the larger church, a Turkish rampart that had existed since the 16th century was demolished in 1742. In 1791, when the church was restored under Bishop Petar Petrović, it was completed with two towers, in which there are five bells, one of which weighs 800 kg.

Initially, the church was equipped with a small iconostasis by Serbian painter Stefan Tenecki. After its disposal, a new wooden iconostasis was carved by Mihajlo Janić between 1833 and 1836 and fitted with six icons, which were painted by Konstantin Danil between 1838 and 1843. Alexander Tepferer gilded the wood carvings in 1839. The outer wall facing Union Square was built in 1822, while the wrought-iron gate facing Emanoil Ungureanu Street was constructed in 1886. The Pantocrator and the Four Evangelists were created in 1903 as the work of the painter Stevan Aleksić. The ornaments of the church were designed by Josef Habinger.

Seven bishops are buried in the church, and several dignitaries who donated their fortune to the church also rest in the nave. Initially, the church hosted Orthodox religious services for both the Serb and Romanian communities, but since 1864, following the separation of the two churches, the building belongs to the Serb community. Members of both the Serbian Orthodox Church and the Romanian Orthodox Church are equally welcome to church services today.

== Gallery ==
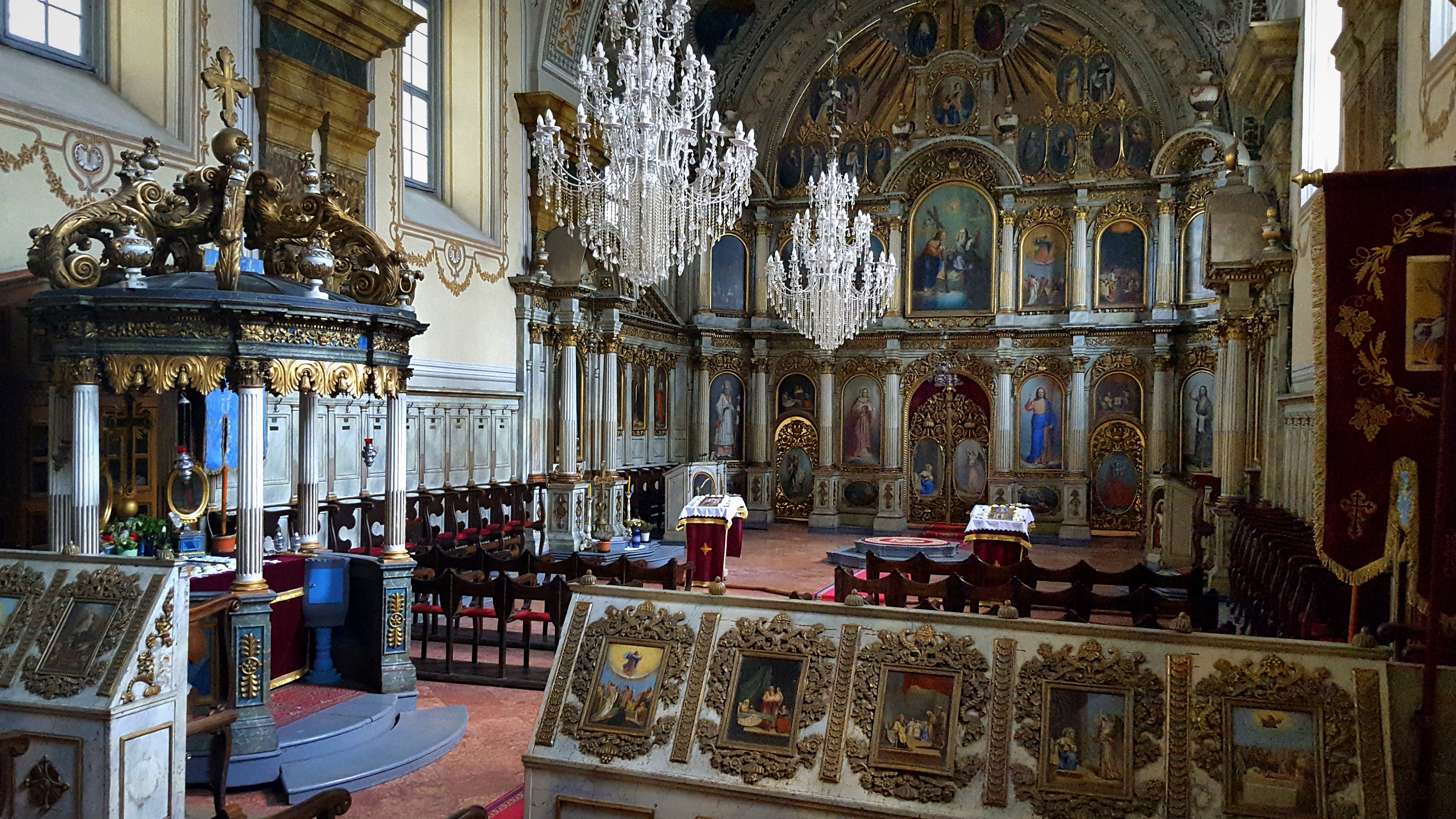
Iconostasis

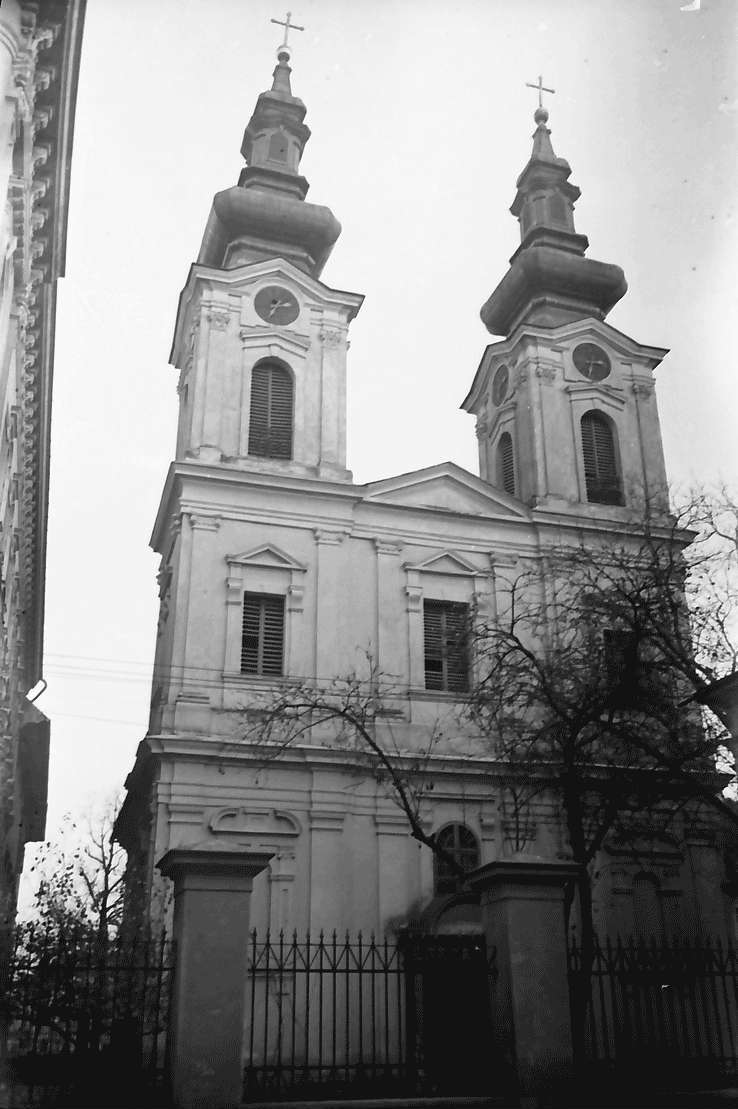
Cathedral in 1937

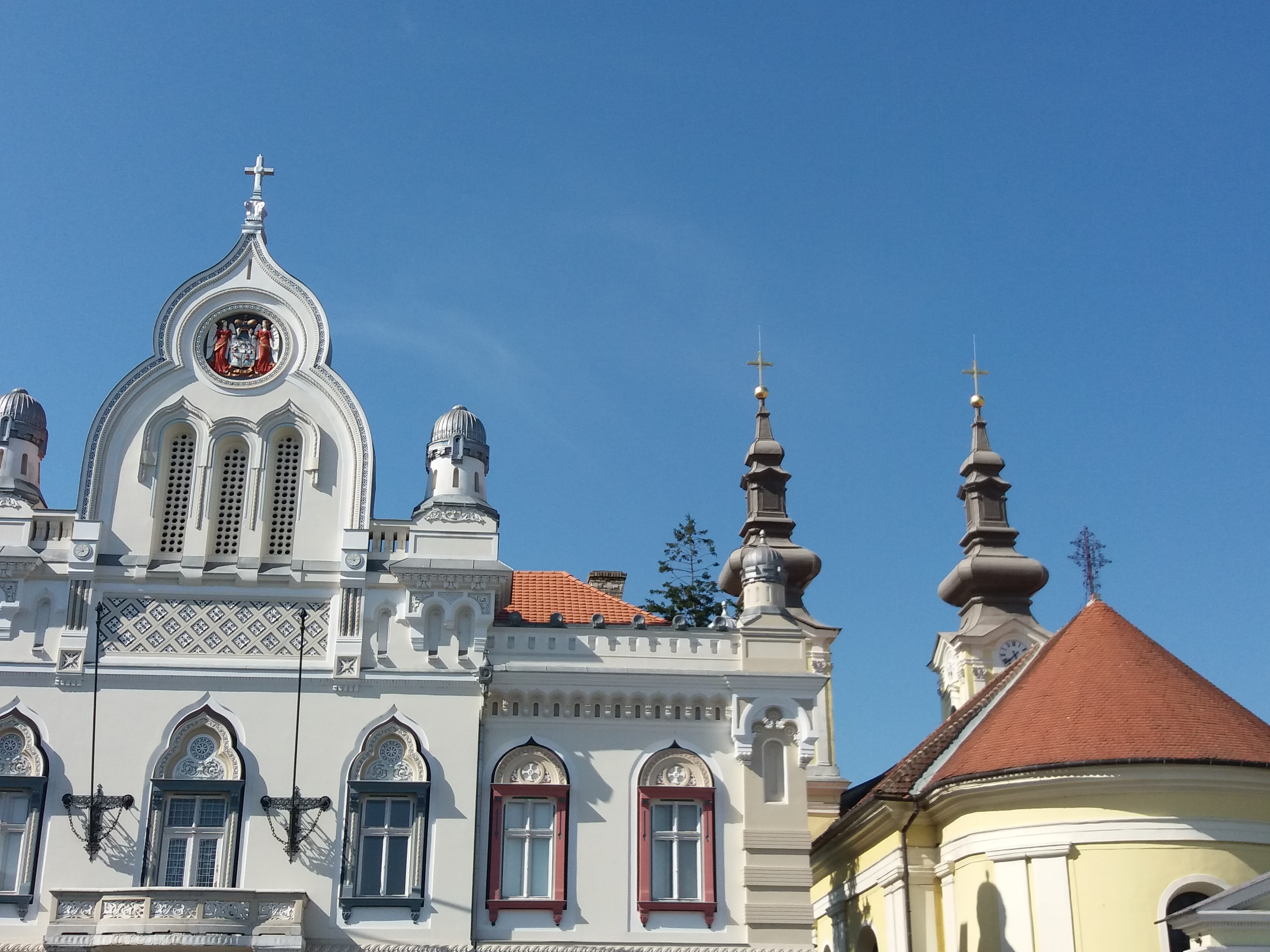
The cathedral and the Bishop's Palace

== See also ==
- Serbian Orthodox Bishop's Palace
- Church of Saint Nicholas
- Church of Saint George
- Eparchy of Timișoara
- Serbs of Romania
