= Church of Saint George, Timișoara =

Serbian Orthodox church in Timișoara, Romania

Church of Saint George
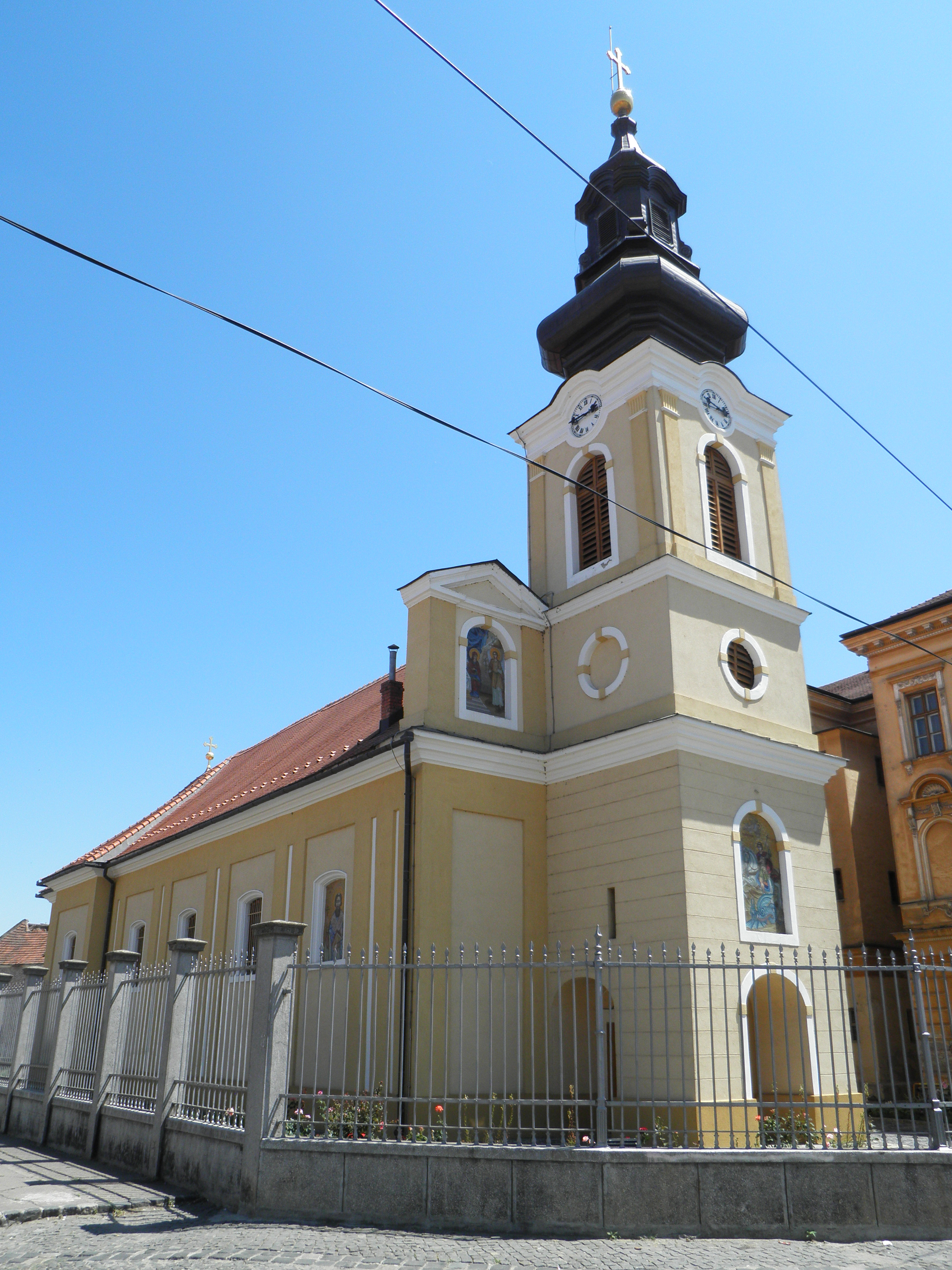

Religion
- Affiliation: Serbian Orthodox Church
- Patron: Saint George
- Status: Active

Location
- Location: 1 Trajan Square, Timișoara
- Interactive map of Church of Saint George
- Coordinates: 45°45′27″N 21°15′3″E

Architecture
- Style: Baroque
- Groundbreaking: 1745
- Completed: 1755

The Church of Saint George (Romanian: Biserica sârbească „Sf. Gheorghe”; Serbian: Црква Светог Ђорђа, romanized: Crkva Svetog Đorđa) is an Eastern Orthodox church located in the Fabric district of Timișoara, Romania. It is under jurisdiction of the Eparchy of Timișoara of the Serbian Orthodox Church.

Located in Trajan Square, it is one of the three Serbian Orthodox churches in the city, along with the Serbian Orthodox Cathedral of the Ascension of the Lord, Timișoara in Cetate's Union Square and the Church of Saint Nicholas in Mehala's Avram Iancu Square.

== History ==
A small Orthodox church existed here since Ottoman rule. In the 17th century this church was in an advanced state of degradation and was replaced by a wooden church. But the first representative Orthodox church in the Fabric district is St. George Church. In fact, after the fire that destroyed the Orthodox church in the Cetate district in 1737, the church in Fabric became the only place of worship for the Orthodox in the city. It was built between 1745 and 1755, in the Baroque style. The church tower, with elements of classical architecture, was raised in 1890, because taller buildings had been built in the square, which dominated the church from an architectural point of view.

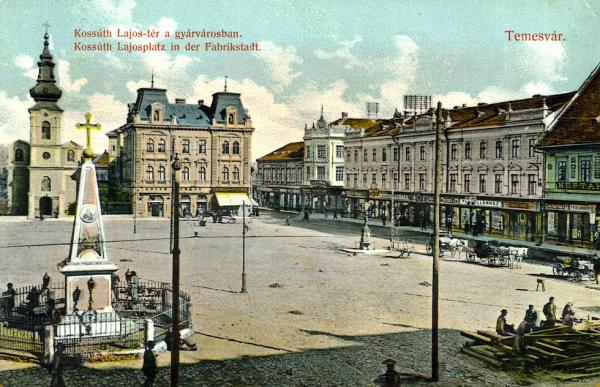
Lajos Kossuth Square (now Trajan Square) with the St. George Church on the left

During the period in which it was built, the Romanian patriarchates in Banat had been transferred under the jurisdiction of the Serbian metropolis, which had moved its seat from Belgrade to Timișoara. Thus, St. George Church was a place of worship for Romanian and Serbian Orthodox parishioners, with services being held in both languages. But there were dissensions between the two communities, the Romanians wanting the hierarchical separation of the two churches. Thus, at the Great Assembly on Câmpia Libertății in 1848, one of the Romanians' demands was the recognition of a Romanian metropolitan in Timișoara. In 1865, the hierarchical separation of the Romanian Orthodox Church from the Serbian one was decided. A few years later, the St. George Church is declared by a court decision to belong only to the Serbian Orthodox community, and the Romanian Orthodox will build a new church in the Fabric district – St. Elijah Church.

== Architecture ==
The church consists of a rectangular nave, a slender tower, attached to the main facade and a polygonal choir, the nave being provided with a gabled roof. The three levels of the tower are bounded by girdles. The a vela vaulting system on double arches articulates the bays and, alongside the church in Veliki Bečkerek (Zrenjanin), was regarded in the 18th century as among the most representative examples within the patriarchate of Sremski Karlovci. The interior of the church was created in 1775 and is the work of the painter Sava Petrović. The iconostasis of the church was designed in 1764 by the painter Nikola Nešković from the Academy of Fine Arts in Bratislava. The mural painting faded during the 19th century and was replaced with decorations done in tempera. In 1894 the vault of the church was redesigned by the German painter Gerhard Mentzel. The right and left votive offerings were made in the first half of the 19th century and represent the martyrs St. George and St. Demetrios. The twelve apostles and the Virgin Mary in the center are the only works in tempera that survive from the original work by Nikola Nešković.

== See also ==
- Cathedral of the Ascension of the Lord
- Serbian Orthodox Episcopal Palace
- Church of Saint Nicholas
- Eparchy of Timișoara
- Serbs of Romania
