= Mercury Palace =

- Palatul Mercur
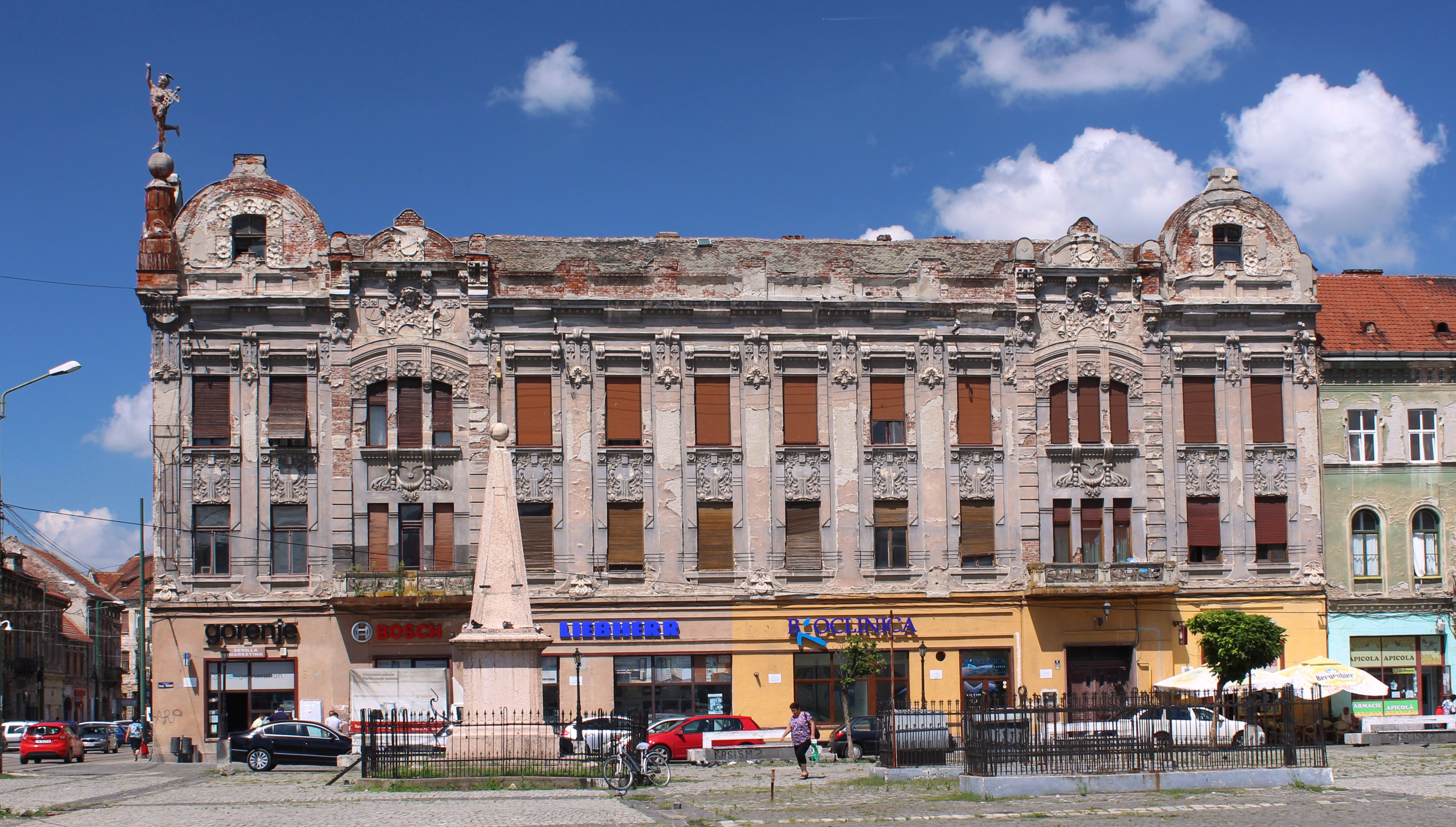
- Interactive map of the Mercury Palace area
- Alternative names: Fiatska Palace

General information
- Architectural style: Secession
- Location: 2 Trajan Square, Timișoara
- Coordinates: 45°45′29″N 21°14′59″E
- Construction started: 1908
- Completed: 1909

Technical details
- Floor count: 3

Design and construction
- Architect: Lipót Baumhorn

Mercury Palace (Romanian: Palatul Mercur) or Fiatska Palace, named after the original owner, is a historic and cultural monument building in the Fabric district of Timișoara, Romania.

== History ==
For Mercury Palace, the building permit was obtained on 13 June 1908 and the permit to finish the works without interior installations and decorations on 1 April 1909, in the style of the 1900s (Secession current), on the site of a much more modest house in terms of plastic expression.

Béla Fiatska, the owner of the edifice, was the president of the Hunnia Philatelic Association, founded in 1906, which aimed to facilitate the philatelic exchange between philatelists. The architect is unknown, although the building is sometimes attributed to Lipót Baumhorn.

In the interwar period, the commercial company Mercur SA operated here, which was engaged in various economic activities, such as: import-export, grocery store, sale of cereals, oil, gasoline, etc. For several decades, both before the construction of the palace, in the previous building, and after the completion of the construction, on the ground floor, the grocer Alexandru Nenadovics carried out his business here.

== Architecture ==
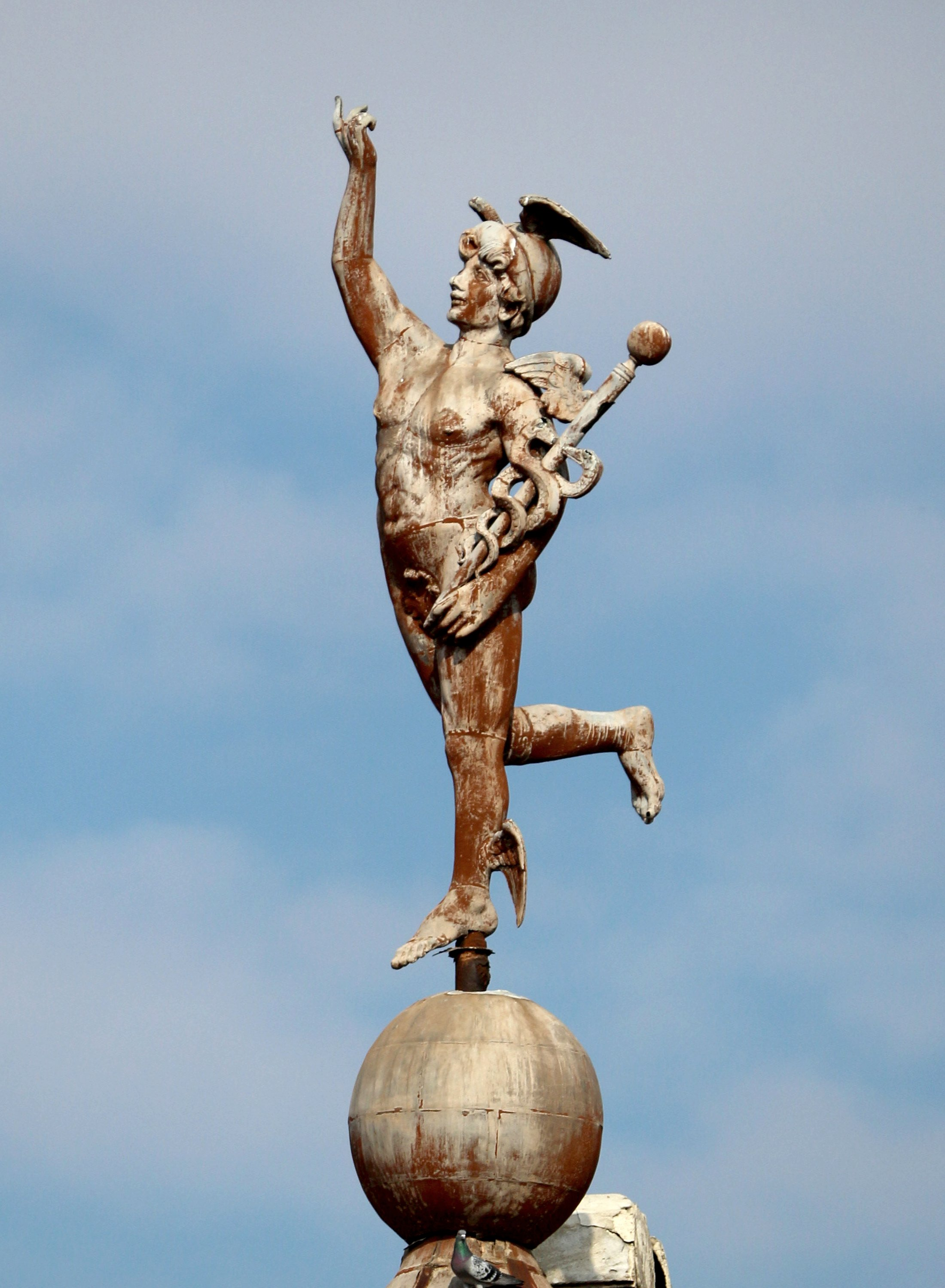
The bronze statue of Mercury overseeing Trajan Square

It owes its name to the bronze statue of Mercury/Hermes (the god of commerce, flight and thieves), on a globe, located in the corner of the building and the Trajan Square, which dominates the beautifully ornamented attic with a decorative roof, this being a copy of Giambologna's Flying Mercury statue. The building, structured on three levels, is made in the architectural style specific to the 1900s, the Secession current. The ground floor was intended for commercial spaces, and the floors were intended for homes. Remarkable is the decoration of the pediments, with flowers whose petals are inscribed in a square, typical of the last phase, the "geometric" phase, the most evolved of the 1900s style.
