= Eparchy of Timișoara =

Diocese of the Serbian Orthodox Church

- Cathedral of the Ascension of the Lord, Timișoara

Location
- Territory: western Romania
- Headquarters: Bishop's Palace, Timișoara, Romania

Information
- Denomination: Eastern Orthodox
- Sui iuris church: Serbian Orthodox Church
- Established: 1608
- Cathedral: Cathedral of the Ascension of the Lord, Timișoara
- Language: Church Slavonic, Serbian

Current leadership
- Bishop: Lukijan Pantelić (administrator)

The Eparchy of Timișoara (Serbian: Епархија темишварска, romanized: Eparhija temišvarska) is a diocese (eparchy) of the Serbian Orthodox Church, covering western Romania (counties of Timiș, Caraș-Severin, Arad, and Mehedinți) and having jurisdiction specifically over ethnic Serbs in that territory.

== Structure ==
The Eparchy of Timișoara comprises 56 parishes. The episcopal see is located at the Cathedral of the Ascension of the Lord, Timișoara. Its headquarters and bishop's residence, are also in Timișoara, both located at the Bishop's Palace.

The diocese operates 55 churches and 5 monasteries, among others:

- Church of Saint Nicholas (Timisoara)
- Church of Saint George (Timisoara)
- Church of Saints Peter and Paul (Arad)
- Sveti Đurađ Monastery (Birda)
- Bazjaš Monastery (Socol)
- Bezdin Monastery (Secusigiu)

== List of bishops ==
- Neofit (1608)
- Isaija (1640)
- Josif (1643)
- Teodor (1643)
- Sevastijan (1644–1647)
- Mihajl (1681–1687)
- Vasilije (1688)
- Josif II (1688)
- Vasilije (1693)
- Isaija Đaković (1695–1710)
- Konstantin Grk (1704–1713)
- Joanikije Vladisavljević (1713–1727)
- Nikola Dimitrijević (1728–1744)
- Georgije Popović (1745–1757)
- Vikentije Jovanović-Vidak (1759–1774)
- Mojsej Putnik (1774–1781)
- Sofronije Kirilović (1781–1786)
- Petar Petrović (1786–1800)
- Stefan Avakumović (1801–1822)
- Josif Putnik (1829–1830)
- Maksim Manulović (1833–1838)
- Pantelejmon Živković (1839–1851)
- Samuilo Maširević (1853–1864)
- Antonije Nako (1864–1869)
- Georgije Vojnović (1874–1881)
- Georgije Branković (1882–1890)
- Nikanor Popović (1891–1901)
- Georgije Letić (1904–1931)
- Lukijan Pantelić (administrator) (1999–present)

== Gallery ==
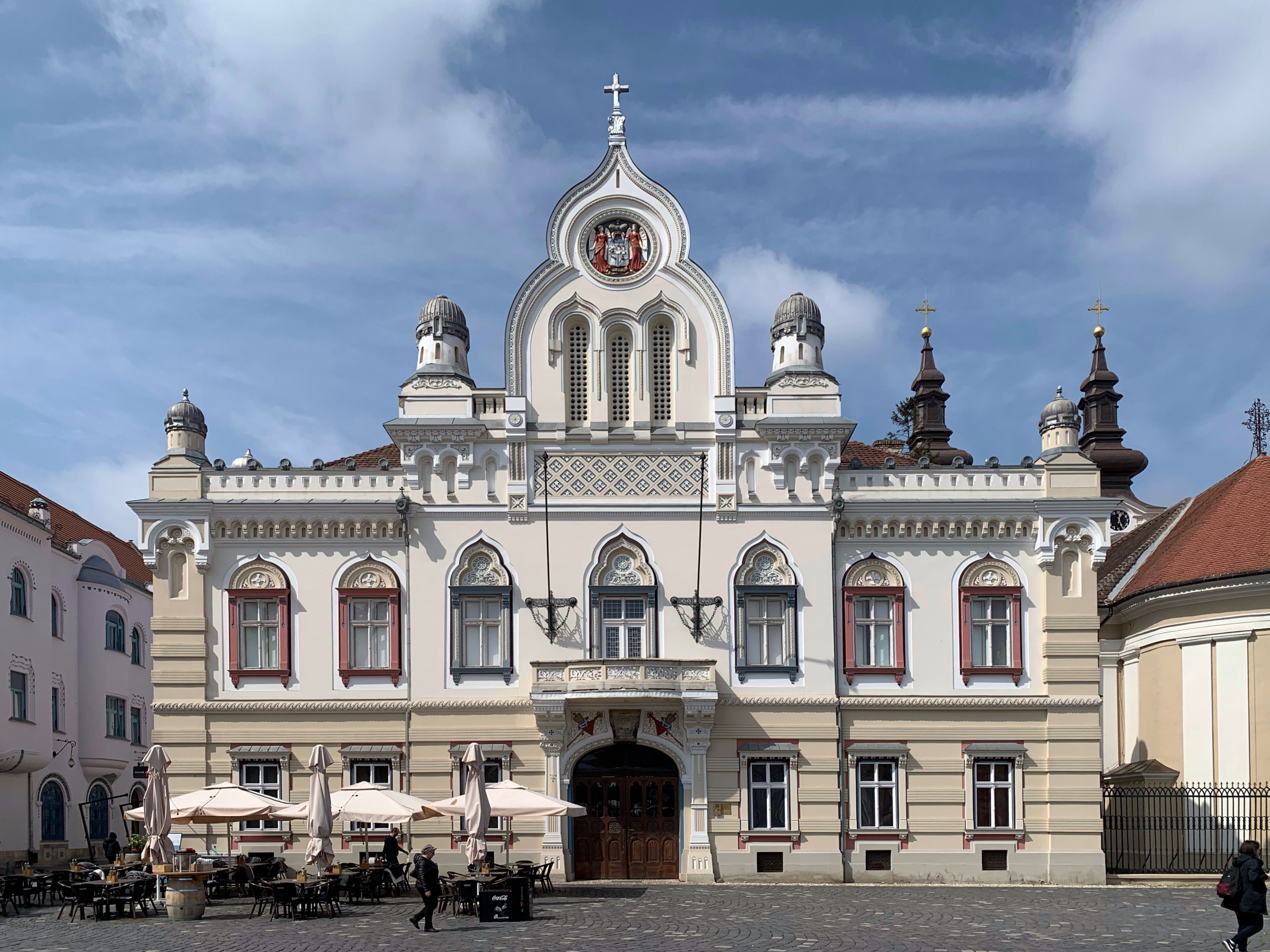
Bishop's Palace

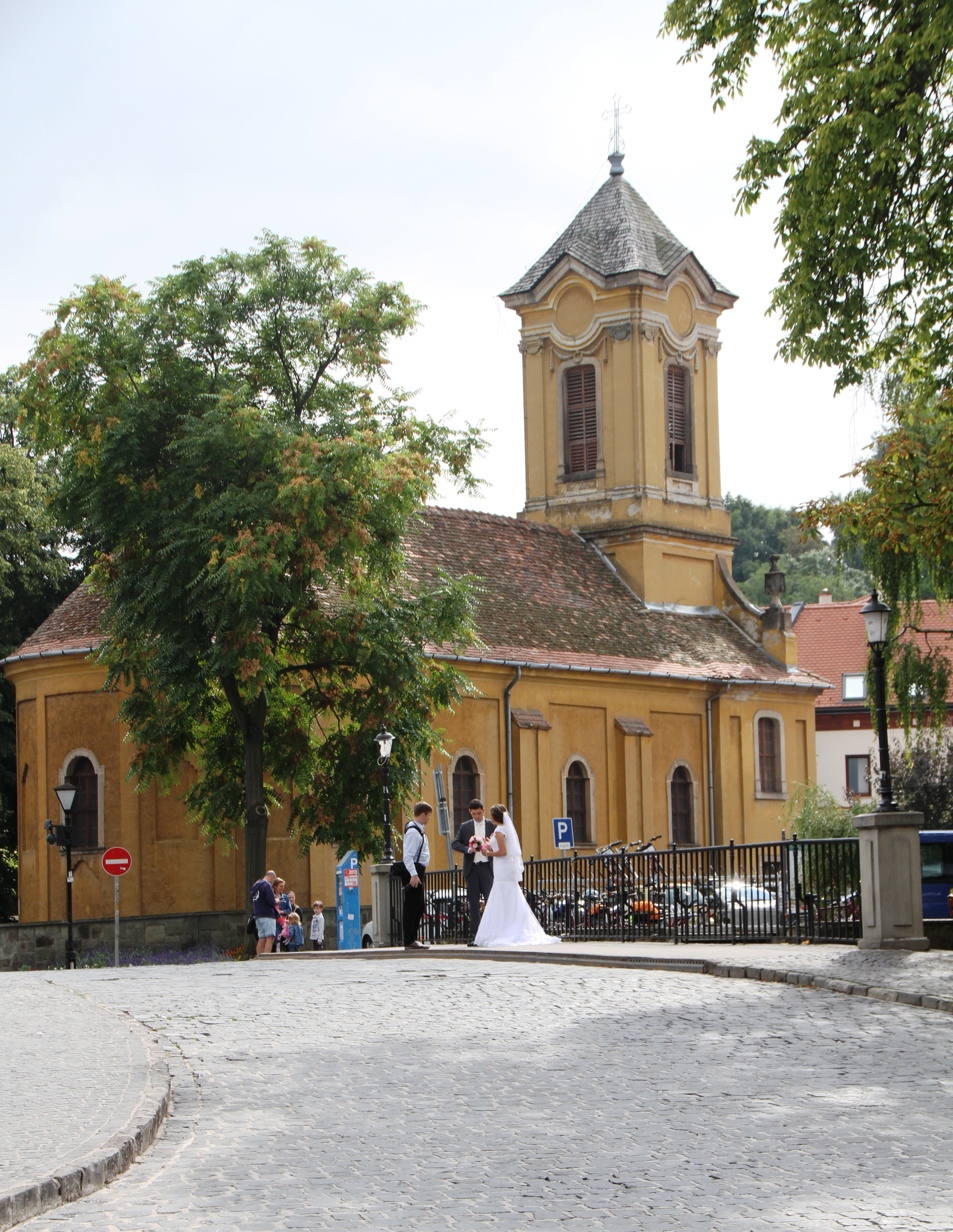
Church of Saint George (Timisoara)

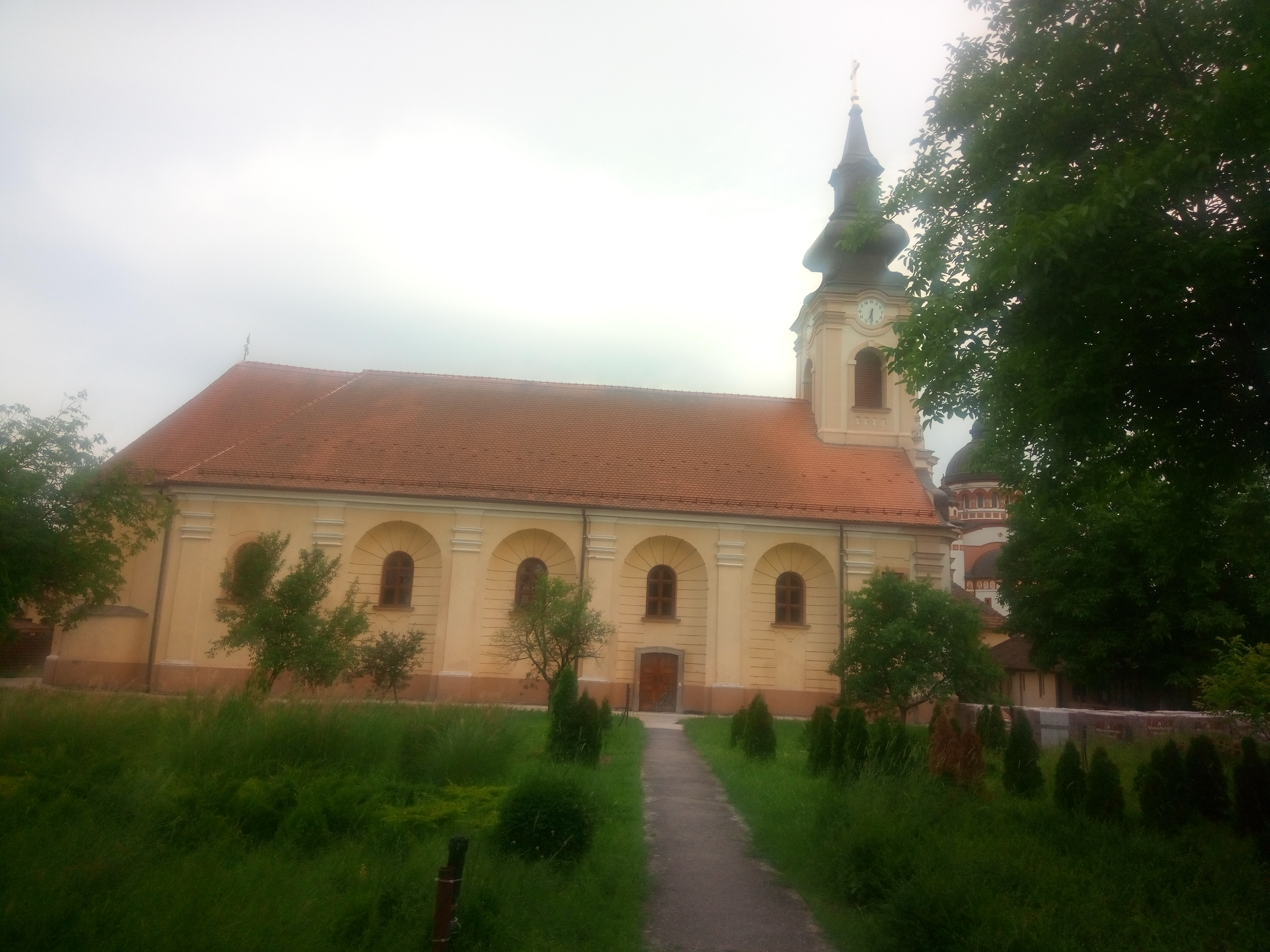
Church of Saint Nicholas (Timisoara)
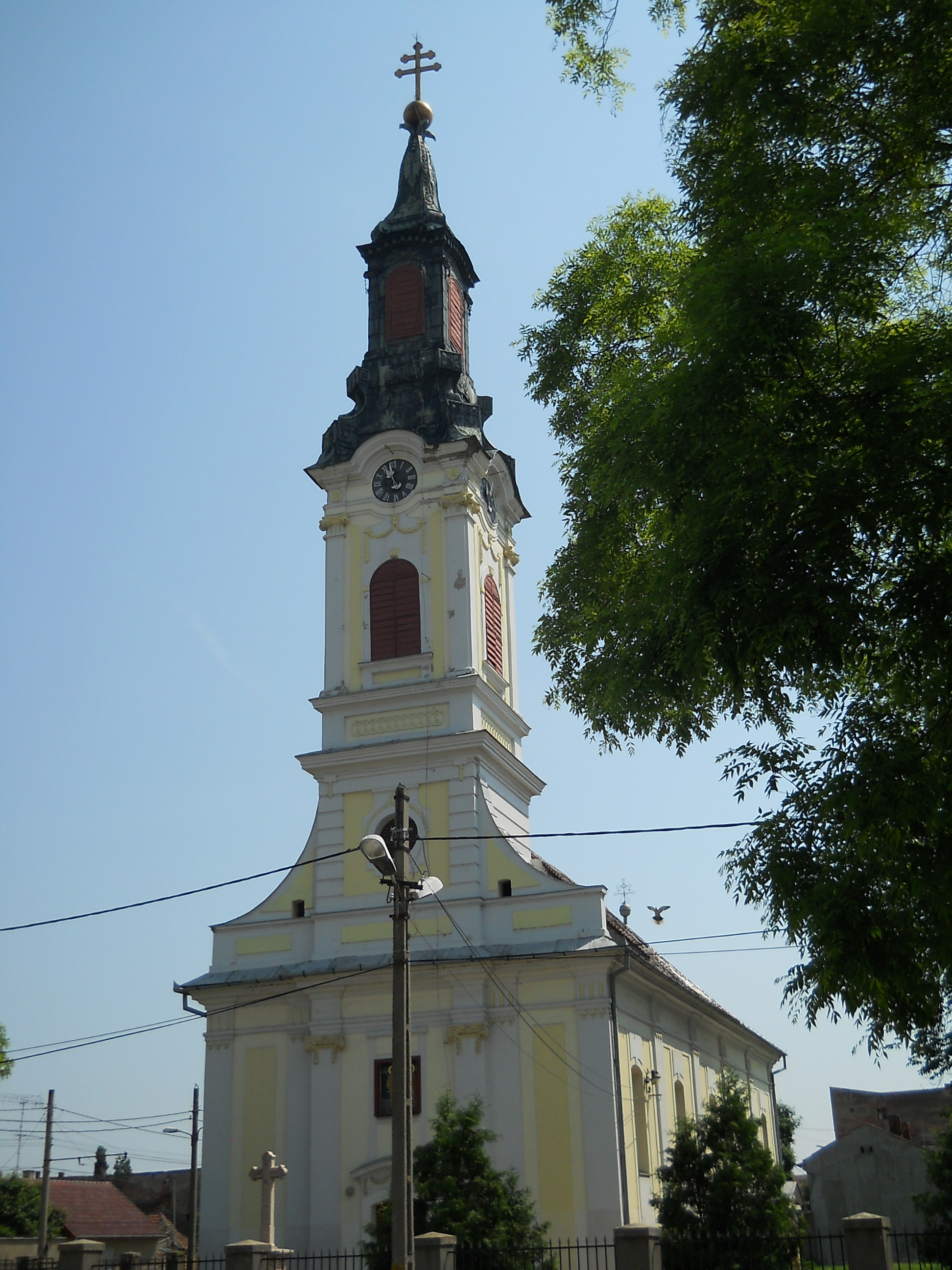
Church of Saints Peter and Paul (Arad)

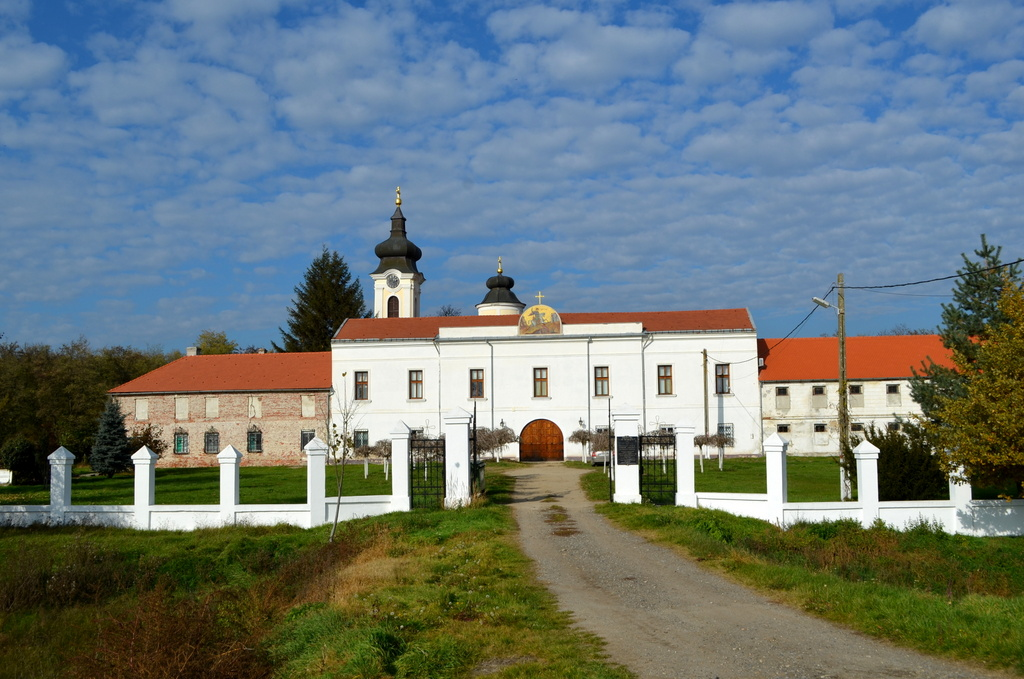
Sveti Đurađ Monastery (Birda)

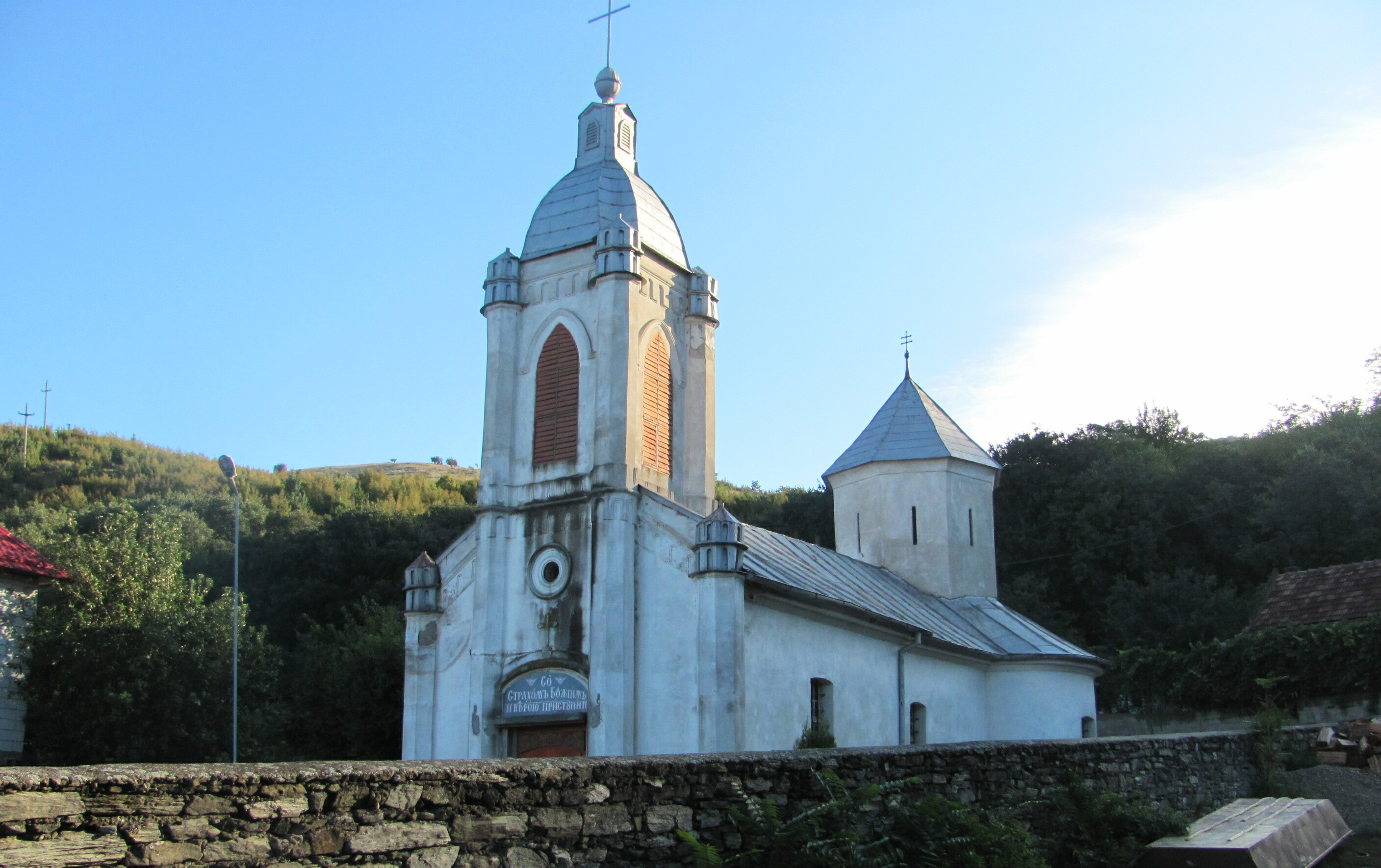
Bazjaš Monastery (Socol)

== See also ==
- Eparchies and metropolitanates of the Serbian Orthodox Church
- Serbs of Romania
