= St. Elijah Church, Timișoara =

Orthodox church in Timișoara, Romania

St. Elijah Church
- Biserica Sf. Ilie
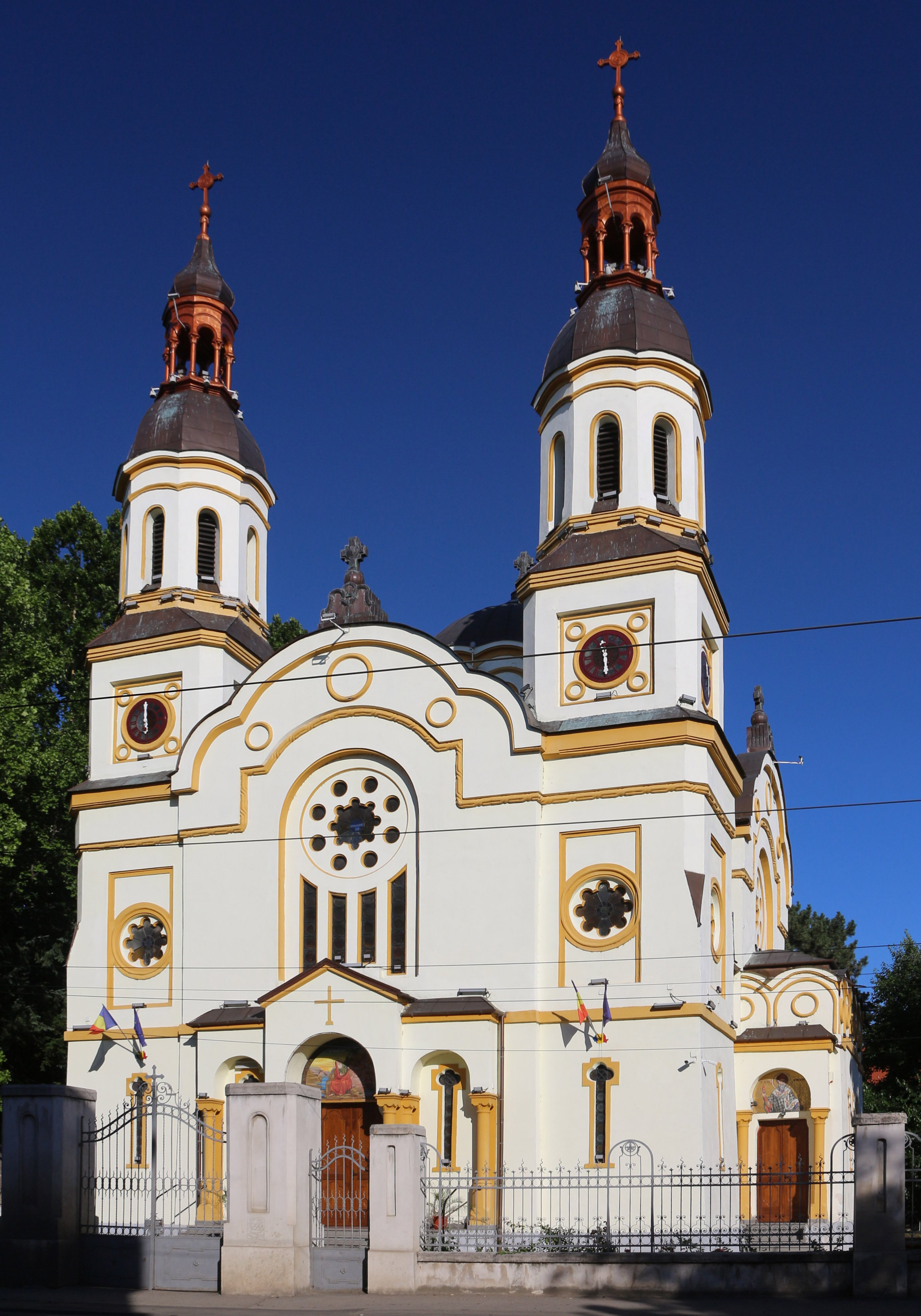

Religion
- Affiliation: Romanian Orthodox
- Ecclesiastical or organizational status: Romanian Orthodox Church
- Patron: Elijah the Tishbite
- Year consecrated: 1936
- Status: Active

Location
- Location: 12 Andrei Șaguna Street, Timișoara
- Interactive map of St. Elijah Church
- Coordinates: 45°45′29″N 21°15′26″E

Architecture
- Architect: Ion Niga
- General contractor: Josef Ecker, Jr.
- Groundbreaking: 1911
- Completed: 1913
- Construction cost: 60,000 kr.

Specifications
- Length: 25.7 m
- Width: 19.9 m
- Height (max): 26.3 m

Website
- parohiasfiliefabric.ro

The St. Elijah Church (Romanian: Biserica Sf. Ilie) is a Romanian Orthodox church in the Fabric district of Timișoara.

== History ==
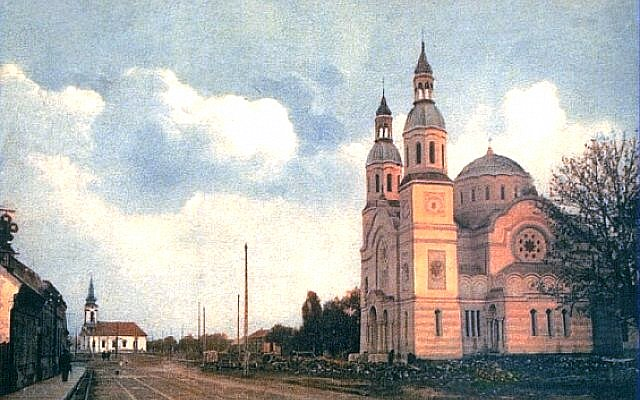
The two St. Elijah churches in Fabric in 1913

In 1818, the city's Romanians, then under the ecclesiastical tutelage of the Serbian Orthodox Church, were granted the right to build their own church by the royal court in Vienna. Following an offertory launched in Timișoara and in the surrounding villages, funds were raised for the erection of the church and the craftsmen in the district undertook to work for free two days a week to build the church. It was built according to the plans of the archpriest Vasile Georgevici, in the usual architectural style of the Orthodox churches from Banat, being consecrated on 20 July 1826, during the feast of St. Elijah. It was painted by George Petrovici. Although it was established as a separate parish from that of St. George, it was considered a branch of the mixed parish. The Serbian ecclesiastical jurisdiction over the Romanian Orthodox lasted until 1865, when the hierarchical separation of the two Orthodox churches took place.

In 1909, as a result of the widening of the Bega Canal, the authorities decided to demolish the church, which stood in the way. This took place in 1913. In 1928, a memorial cross was placed on the site of the altar. Concurrently, the city donated a nearby plot of land for the building of a new church, as well as 60 thousand kronen. Several authors cite László Székely as the architect, but records of the parish council indicate this was Ion Niga of Szeged. The diocese of Arad intervened on the architecture through Paul Rozvan on 16 February 1909, who modified the original plan by "lowering" the central dome and raising the two towers on the western side as compensation. Construction began in May 1911. The exterior was completed the following year, while the interior was ready in July 1913. A provisional consecration took place in October. The first repairs, targeting the leaky roof, occurred after 1928, with a formal consecration coming in 1936.

At that time, the new church of St. Elijah was the most spacious place of prayer for the Romanian Orthodox in Timișoara, where, for years, the anniversary Te Deums and military parades were held. In 1919, after the city came under Romanian administration, the Romanian Army troops stationed there were blessed in front of the church. Patriarch Miron Cristea celebrated the Christmas liturgy there in 1929, while King Carol II attended a service in 1931.

== Architecture ==
The church measures 19.9 by 25.7 meters, rising to a height of 26.3 meters. It takes the form of a Greek cross. The Sibiu Orthodox Cathedral served as a model. Ioan Zaicu led the mural painting of 18 frescoes depicting saints and biblical scenes, as well as 38 iconostasis icons. Brothers Nistor and Iosif Busuioc from Berliște were responsible for carving the iconostasis and other woodwork. A fire in 1935 seriously damaged some of the painting, prompting repair work. The mural was thus completed in 1936 with two panels (Samaritan woman and Prodigal son) in the choir of the church by Ioachim Miloia.
