= Timișoreana Brewery =

Brewery in Fabric, Timișoara, Romania

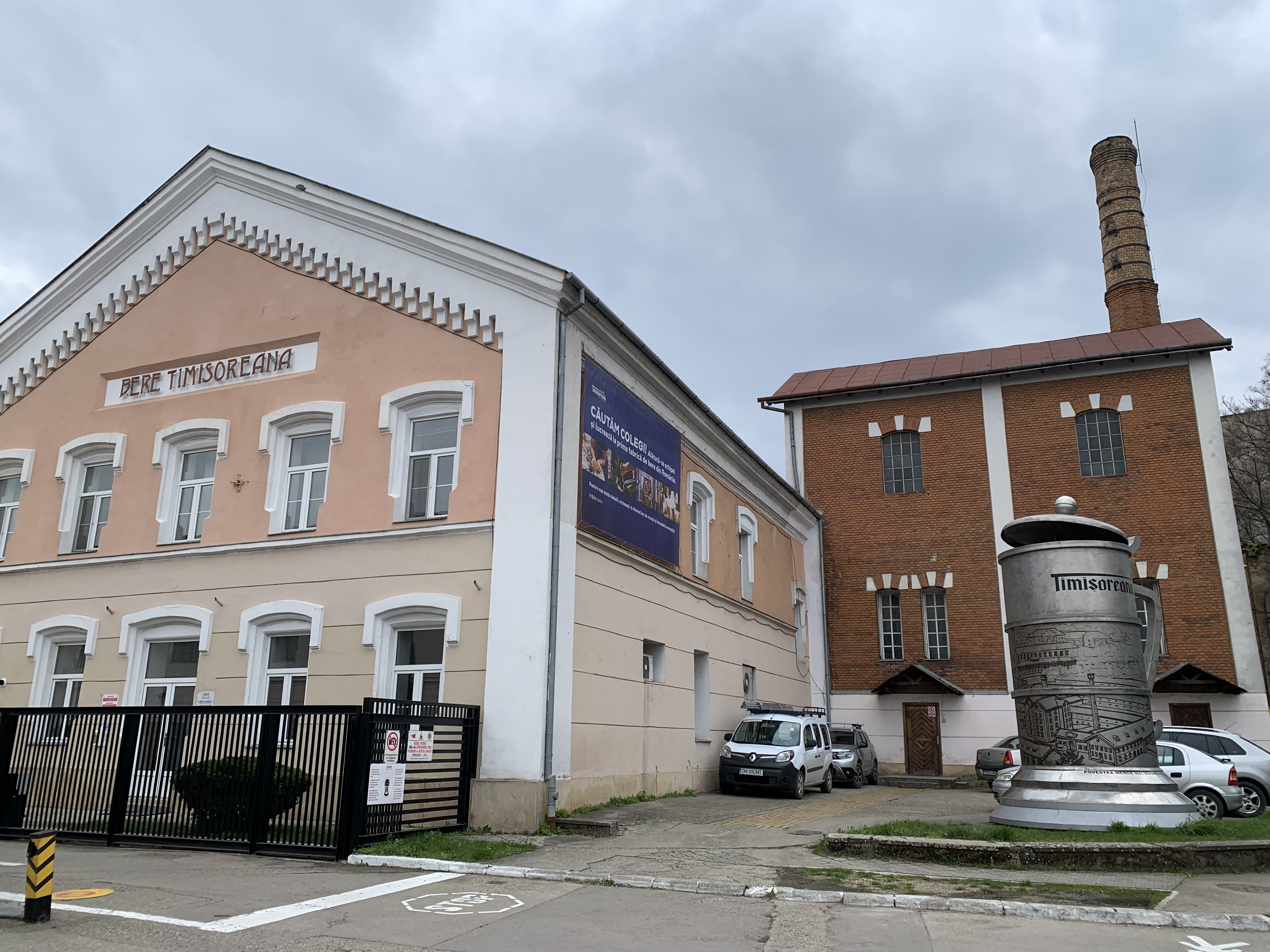
- The brewery complex in 2023
- Location: Timișoara, Romania
- Coordinates: 45°45′10″N 21°14′51″E
- Opened: 1718
- Annual production volume: 2.6–2.7 million hectoliters
- Owned by: Ursus Breweries
- Website: www.beretimisoreana.ro

Active beers
Name	Type
Timișoreana	Blonde lager
Timișoreana 0%	Non-alcoholic lager

Timișoreana Brewery (Romanian: Fabrica de bere Timișoreana) is the first brewery established on the current territory of Romania, in the Fabric district of Timișoara, in 1718. The brewery is owned today by Ursus Breweries and has a technical capacity of 3.1 million hectoliters per year. It currently produces around 2.6–2.7 million hectoliters of beer annually, which means over 16% of the annual local production estimated at over 16 million hectoliters of beer. Eleven brands are produced here, including Timișoreana, Ursus, Grolsch or Stejar; moreover, Timișoreana is the best-selling beer brand in Romania.

== History ==
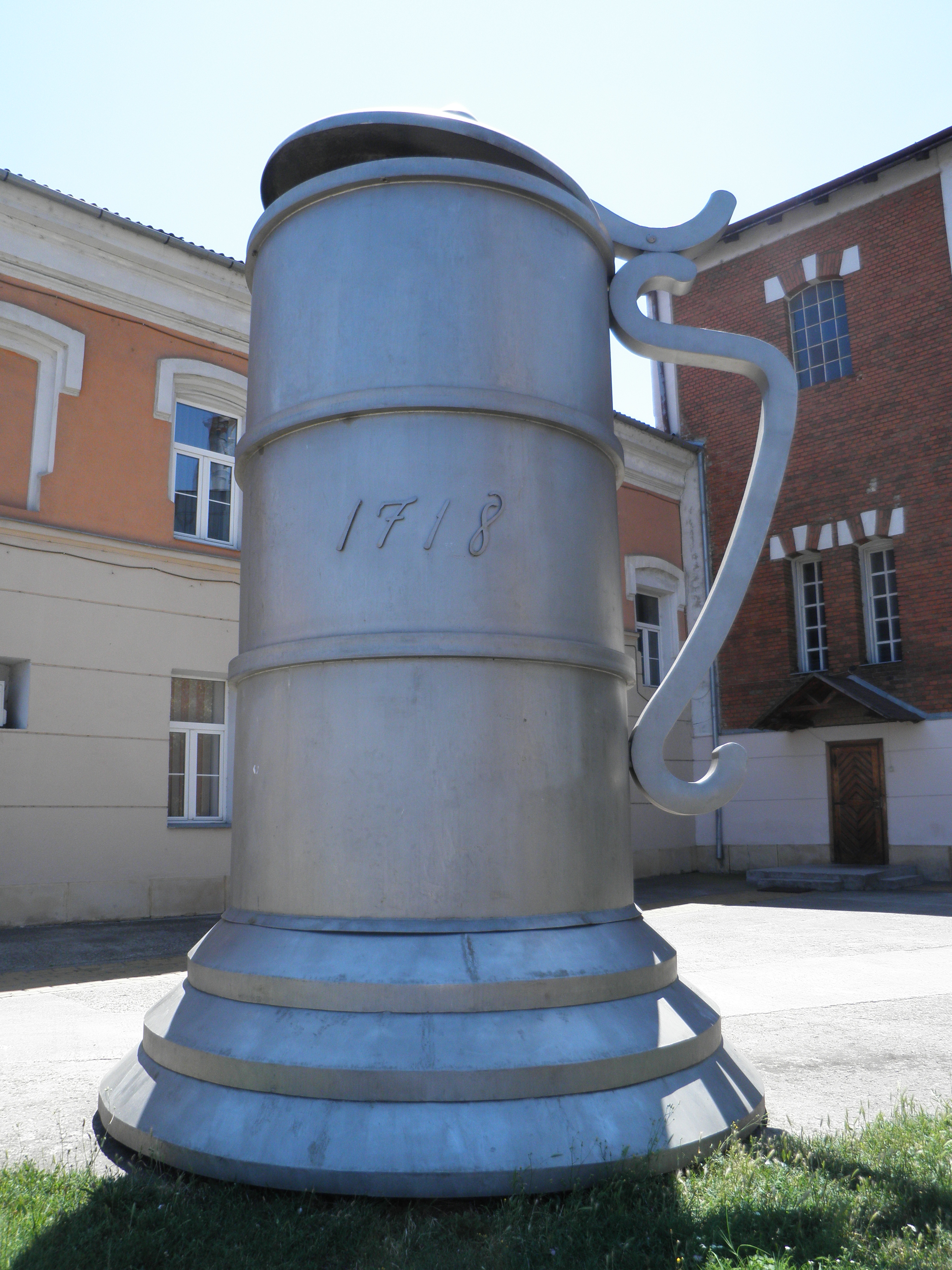
A monumental beer mug with the brewery's founding date inscribed

After the Ottomans were driven out in 1716, the military administration of the fortress under Prince Eugene of Savoy ordered the installation of kettles in 1718 to supply drinking water to residents. Along with this, boilers for brewing beer and distilling spirits were also set up. In 1727, the brewery was privatized, becoming the first joint-stock company in Banat. The brewery, leased to Philipp Bauer, brought a considerable amount of income to the local budget. With the elevation of Timișoara to a royal free city in 1779, the administration of the brewery passed from the imperial administration to the city administration.

In 1872, the stock market crash in Vienna produced an economic recession throughout the Austrian Empire, the effects of which were also felt by Timișoara. The brewery here was put up for auction and purchased by Alexander Bayer, who sacrificed his entire fortune in an attempt to save it from bankruptcy. In 1874 the brewery was temporarily taken over by the First Savings Bank (German: Erste Sparkasse) and in 1882 it was bought by the brewer Ignaz Deutsch from Vienna. As Fabrikshof Bierbrauerei Aktiengesellschaft, it was managed by Ignaz Deutsch & Son until 1929.

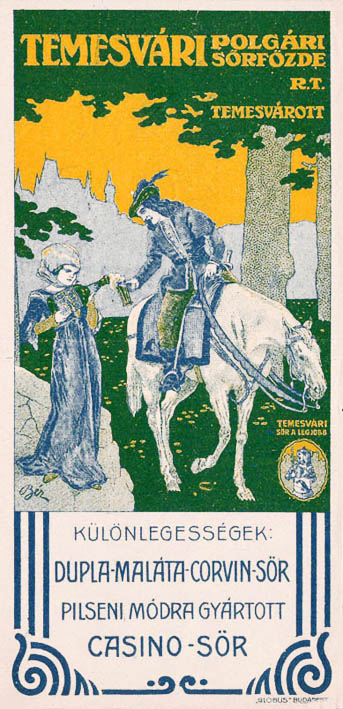
Advertisement of Timișoara beer factory around 1908

In 1890, a strong fire almost completely destroyed the main buildings and industrial installations. The destruction caused by the fire allowed a complete re-technologization to the highest standards of the time, the brewery becoming one of the most modern beer production units in Southeast Europe. The brewery was equipped with artificial cooling facilities, its own malt production facility and huge storage cellars popularly known as "catacombs". In addition to the brewery, a summer garden, a dance hall and a beer hall were set up. The first beer filter in Romania was introduced in 1920. Also during the 1920s, the brewery in Timișoara became the official supplier of beer to the Royal House of Romania.

Between the two world wars, when it was owned by Csel & Sons, the brewery produced beers such as Casino, blonde, prepared according to the pilsner method; Record, intense blonde; Corvin à la Munich, with high sugar content; and English Porter, intense dark. At the time, it had 120–160 employees and produced with the help of the 250 hp steam engine a quantity of about 60,000 hectoliters. In 1948, the brewery was nationalized, becoming the property of the state. In the 1960s, the brewery in Timișoara became the second production unit in the world to operate with full automation of all machines. From 1916 to 1975, the brewery was connected to the tram network of the city.

After the acquisition of the brewery by the South African manufacturer SABMiller, in 2002, the production unit benefited from extensive investment programs, intended both to increase the production capacity and to modernize the historical buildings. Timișoreana is now managed as a beer brand within the Ursus Group, which in turn has belonged to the Japanese brewery group Asahi since 2017.

Since 2002, the Timișoreana Brewery has been organizing the Timișoreana Celebrations (Romanian: Serbările Timișoreana), an annual outdoor beer festival.
