= Serbian Orthodox Bishop's Palace, Timișoara =

Serbian Orthodox Bishop's Palace
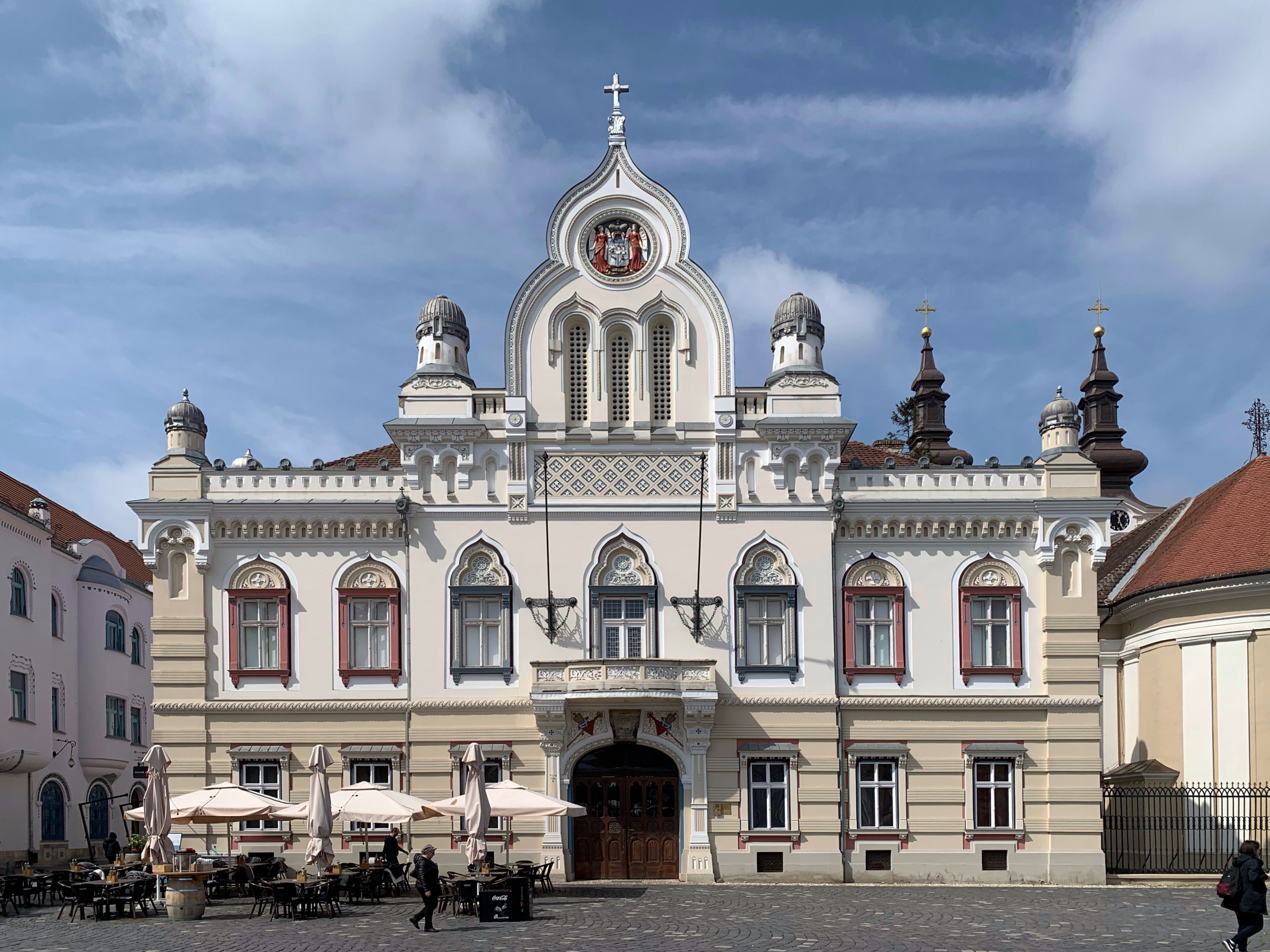
- Interactive map of the Serbian Orthodox Bishop's Palace area
- Alternative names: Serbian Vicariate

General information
- Architectural style: Vienna Secession, neo-Serbian
- Location: Union Square, Timișoara, Romania
- Coordinates: 45°45′27″N 21°13′39″E
- Construction started: 1745
- Completed: 1748
- Renovated: 1906, 1983, 2013

Renovating team
- Architect: László Székely

The Serbian Orthodox Bishop's Palace of Timișoara (Serbian: Владичански двор епархије темишварске, romanized: Vladičanski dvor eparhije temišvarske) is a historical building in Timișoara, Romania. The building serves as the seat of the Eparchy of Timișoara of the Serbian Orthodox Church and houses the bishop's the residence.

It is part of the Serbian Quarter, known as Careul Sârbesc ("Serbian Square"), alongside the Cathedral of the Ascension of the Lord and the House of the Serb Community.

== History ==
The eastern body of the building, and partly the southern one, was built between 1745 and 1748, commissioned by the Serbian Orthodox bishop Georgije Popović, to serve as an episcopal residence and seat of the Serbian school, the edifice being originally built in the provincial baroque style.

In 1790, the meeting of the superior clergy of the Archbishopric of Carlowitz took place here.

During the 19th century, several stages of construction took place, the southern wing being completed and the western wing being built, in 1812 being mentioned the completion of the building with the body located at 10 Emanoil Ungureanu Street. During this period, the building receives a historicist appearance. In 1864, after the hierarchical separation of the Romanian Orthodox Church in Transylvania and Banat from the Serbian one, the palace returned to the Serbian Orthodox Episcopate.

On 16 August 1905, a building permit was obtained for the remodeling of the facades according to the project made by László Székely, with bishop Georgije Letić as the sponsor. The palace underwent major changes: the western wing was completed, the southern wing was over-storied, and regarding the facade of the building, the old baroque decor was replaced with an eclectic one with Byzantine influences. The work was completed on 7 October 1906. In 1911, decorations taken from Serbian architecture were added.

Currently, the building houses the Museum Collection of the Serbian Orthodox Bishopric, opened in 1967 and housed in six rooms, but also several businesses operating on the ground floor of the building, such as restaurants, cafes and an antique shop. There is also a particularly valuable library and archive here, where the original plans of the palace are kept.

The building was restored in 1983, together with the rest of the buildings in Union Square, and between 2010 and 2013.

== Architecture ==
The facade of the building was reconstructed in the 1900s, in Serbian national architectural style. The ground floor is treated as a plinth, and the first floor has neo-Serbian decorations above the windows. At roof level, the three central bays are dominated by a monumental pediment, imitating forms from traditional Russian architecture. Above the entrance gate one can see the coat of arms of the Eparchy of Timișoara.

== Gallery ==
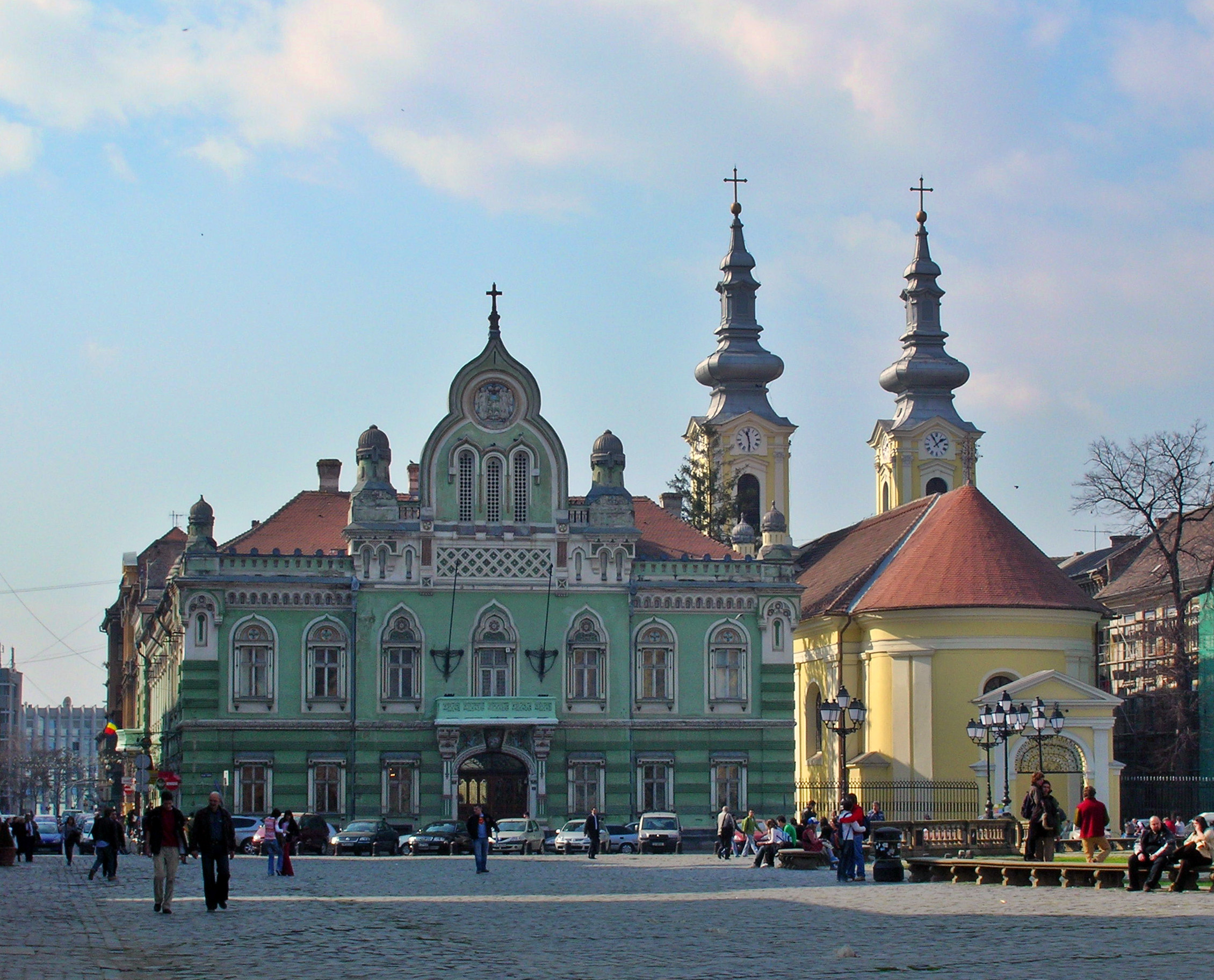
Bishop's Palace and Cathedral of the Ascension of the Lord

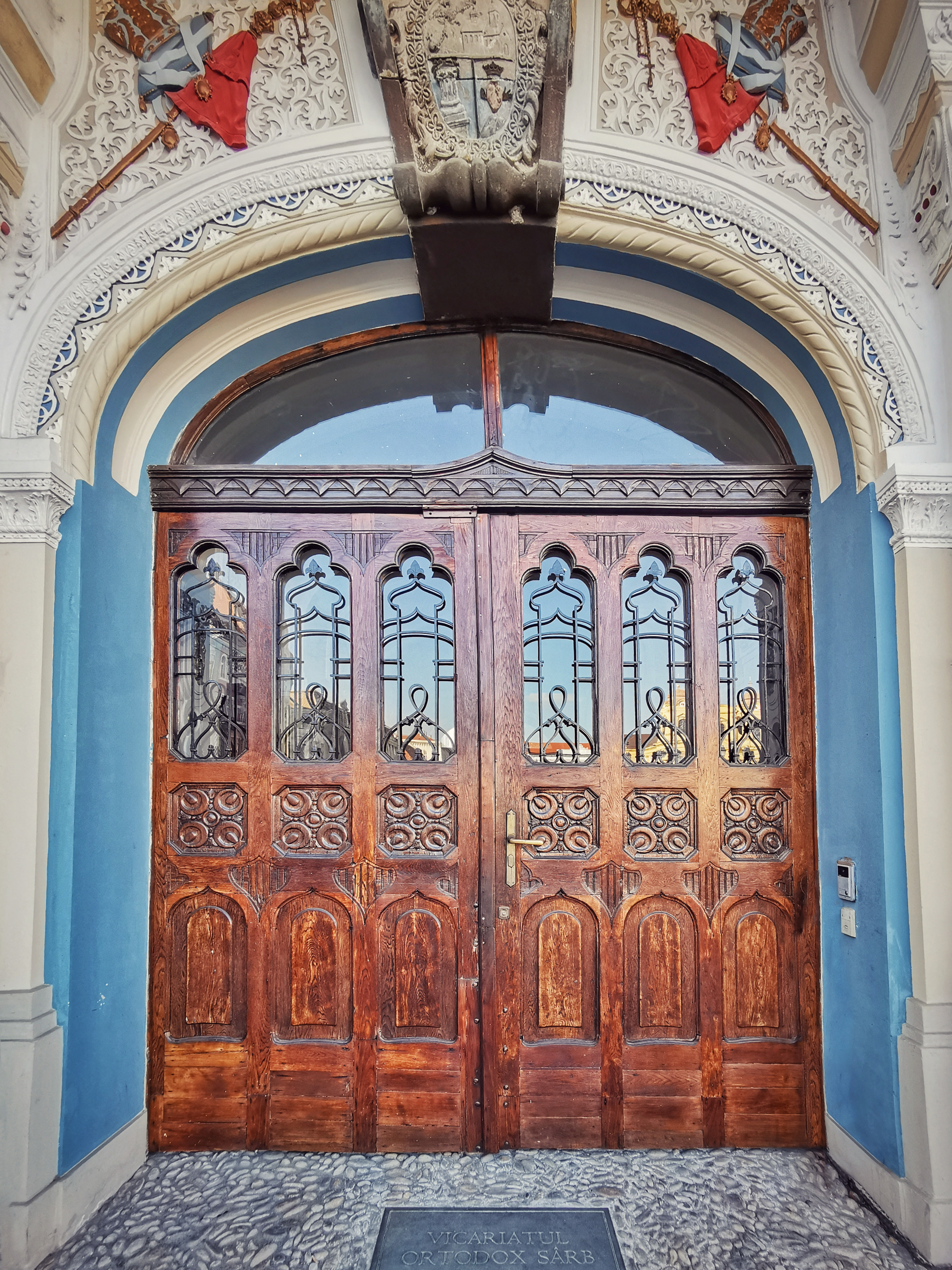
The coat of arms of the Eparchy of Timișoara above the entrance gate

== See also ==
- Bishop's Palace, Novi Sad
- Bishop's Palace, Vršac
- Palace of the Patriarchate, Sremski Karlovci
- Serbs of Romania
