= House of the Serb Community, Timișoara =

House of the Serb Community
- Дом српске заједнице
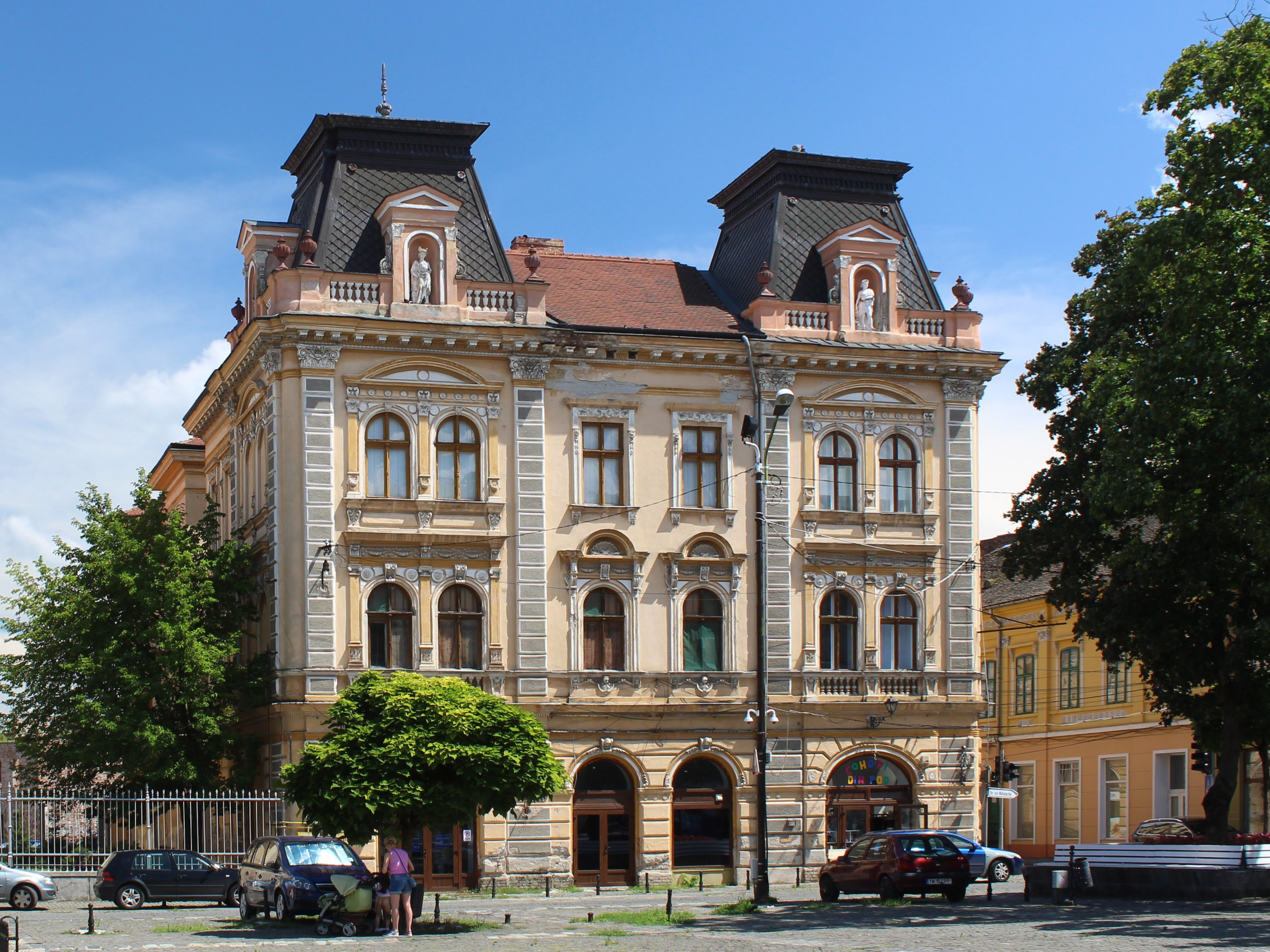
- Interactive map of the House of the Serb Community area
- Alternative names: Minerva Foundation House

General information
- Architectural style: Second Empire
- Location: 1 Ion Mihalache Street, Timișoara, Romania
- Coordinates: 45.7575°N 21.2508°E
- Construction started: 1894
- Completed: 1895

The House of the Serb Community (Serbian: Дом српске заједнице, romanized: Dom srpske zajednice), also known as the Minerva Foundation House, is a historical building in the Fabric district of Timișoara, Romania. It is part of the Fabric (I) urban site, a historical monument with LMI code TM-II-s-B-06096.

== History ==
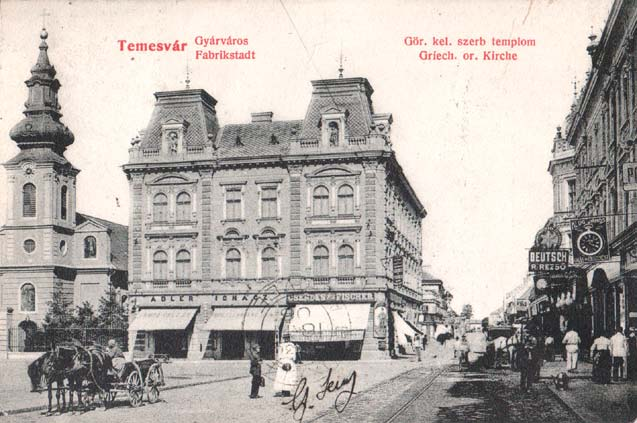
Trajan Square, with the House of the Serb Community in the foreground, early 20th century

The current site of the building was once home to the Serb foundation house in the 19th century, which was built by Nikola Ilija Papa and Jovan Preda.

In 1894, the construction permit for the current building was issued, with the works being completed on 29 July 1895.

The Kohn brothers' store operated on the ground floor for several years before the space was taken over by the Csendes merchant family, who ran a trinket and fashion shop.

== Architecture ==
The architecture of the Serb Community House is historicist, combining eclectic elements, specific to the late 19th century, also known as the Second Empire style. It has three levels and a polygonal plan, an aspect that gives it an imposing presence in the urban landscape.

== See also ==
- Serbs of Romania
