= Fabric, Timișoara =

Fabric Gyárváros (Hungarian) Fabrikstadt (German) Фабрика (Serbian)
- District of Timișoara
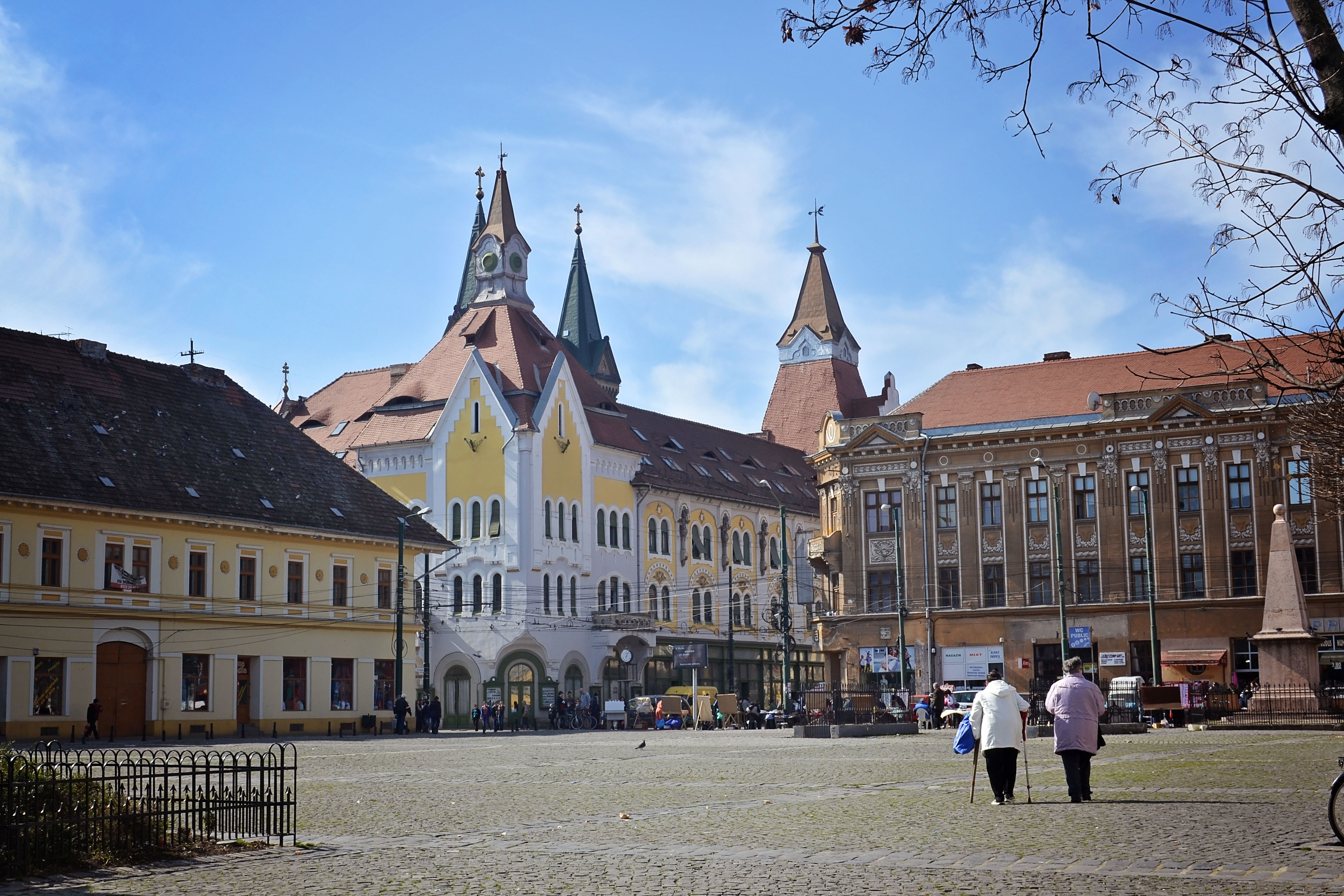
- Trajan Square in Fabric
- Nickname: The merchants' district
- Interactive map of Fabric
- Coordinates: 45°45′26″N 21°14′56″E
- Country: Romania
- County: Timiș
- City: Timișoara
- Established: 1744
- Founder: Claude Florimond de Mercy

Area
  - Total: 10.17 km^{2} (3.93 sq mi)

Fabric (Hungarian: Gyárváros; German: Fabrikstadt; Serbian: Фабрика, romanized: Fabrika) is one of the oldest historic districts of Timișoara, Romania. It is located in the central-eastern part of Timișoara, in the vicinity of the Cetate district, being a continuation of the historical city centre. Its name comes from the factories that were built here since its appearance in the 18th century.

== Location ==
In general terms, the boundaries of the neighborhood can be described as follows: to the south, the Beer Factory (established alongside the neighborhood in 1718); to the north, the site of the present-day East Station; to the west, the Hydroelectric Plant; and to the east, the Neptune Baths.

== Name ==
In 1744, the settlement was named Fabrique, a designation derived from the factories established there in its early development. An alternative name, Raizische Fabrique, referred to the Orthodox faith of most inhabitants at the time. From the mid-19th century onward, the spelling was simplified to Fabrik. As the area became increasingly oriented toward Cetate, the term Vorstadt Fabrik ("Factory Suburb") also entered use, appearing, for example, on the 1849 city map. Toward the end of the 19th century, this evolved—amid the broader process of Magyarization following the Austro-Hungarian Compromise of 1867—into the Hungarian name Gyárkülváros, literally "Factory Suburb." Around the turn of the century, this was further simplified to Gyárváros, with the German equivalent Fabrikstadt ("Factory City"). Although the latter is still occasionally used by German-speaking residents, it never replaced the established term Fabrik. After the city's transfer to Romania under the Treaty of Trianon, the district was known as Fabrică during the interwar period; it acquired its present name, Fabric, after World War II.

== History ==
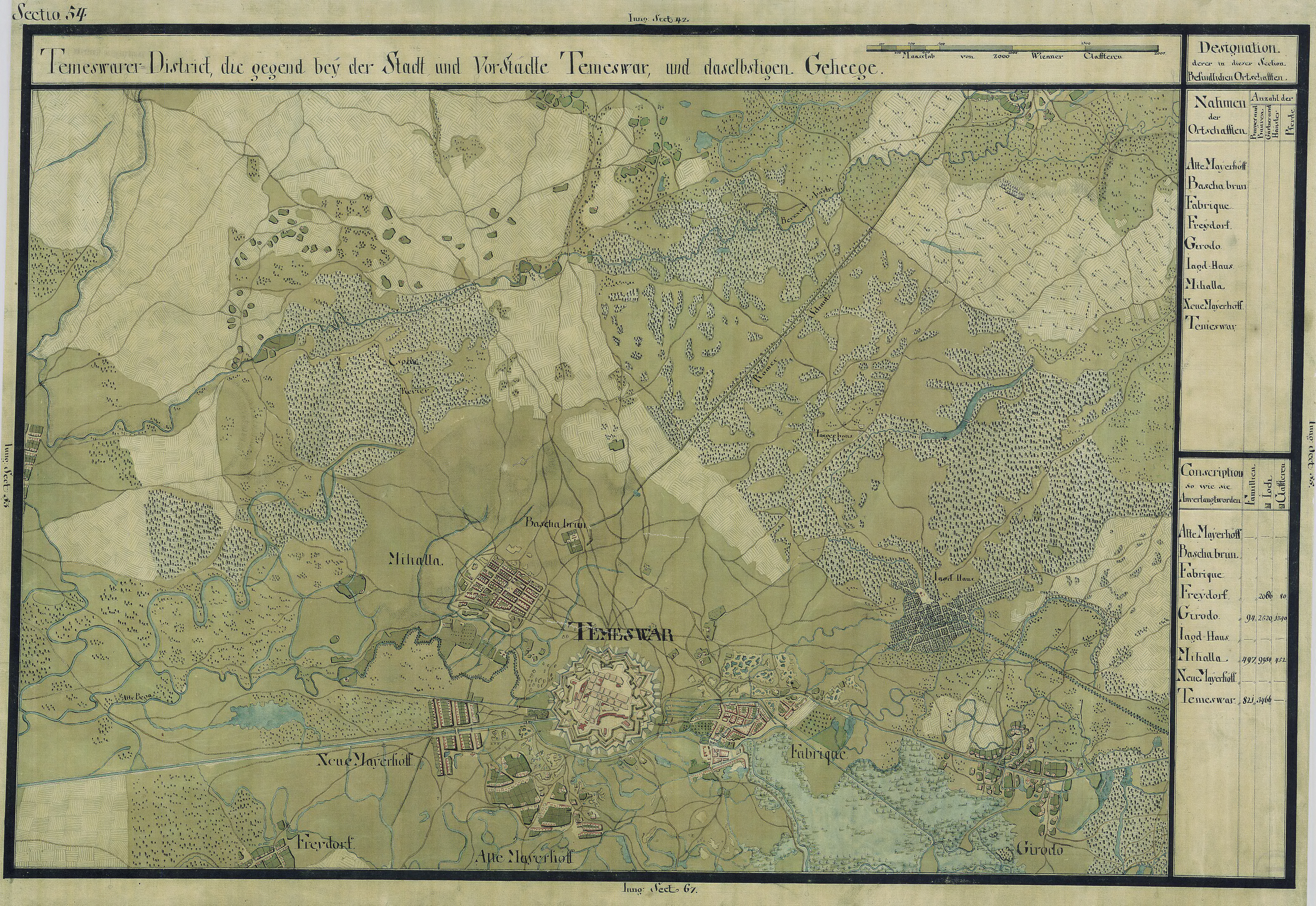
Fabric (Fabrique) in the Josephinian Land Survey of 1769–1772

Until after 1716, the present-day Fabric, located east of the Cetate district, was not inhabited. In 1716 there were only two water mills in this area. The northern one may have served as a powder keg in the 1660s.

A so-called "esplanade" surrounded the fortress of Timișoara until 1892. It was a 948-meter-wide strip of land on which building was forbidden, so that a possible enemy could not hide behind the buildings that would have been built here. Therefore, Fabric was built outside the esplanade. The first manufactories were built east of the fortress, in the present-day Fabric, starting with 1732 (according to other sources 1727). The construction of the district was approved in 1744. Its outline was determined by the sinuous shapes of the surrounding swamps and water arms. Fabric was at that time an incipient industrial suburb, with many manufactories, workshops and guilds located here. The most important guilds in Fabric in the 18th and 19th centuries were those of the shoemakers, saddlers, furriers, coopers, boilermakers and fishermen. The bakers, butchers, locksmiths, watchmakers, millers, wig makers and tailors were also well represented. The individual trades united to form societies with their own festive days, patron saints and flags. In the 18th century there were eight mills, a cloth factory (1725), a silk factory, a tobacco factory, a brewery (1718) and a waterworks. The waterworks was depicted on the city's coat of arms in 1781 and was built in 1726 by engineer Karl Schindler on the orders of Count Claude Florimond de Mercy. In 1850 there was an oil factory that produced rapeseed and sunflower oil. Agricultural and handicraft tools as well as bells, organs, vinegar, alcohol, soap, towels, silk, gunpowder, bricks, pencils and pasta were manufactured in Fabric in the 18th century.

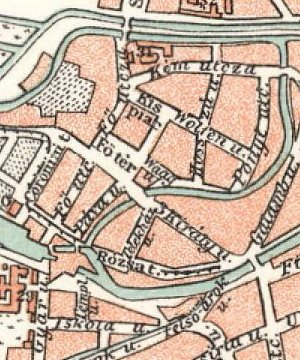
Map of the central area of Fabric (Fő tér) in 1890

Initially, Fabric consisted of two distinct districts: the "Rascian Fabric", a neighborhood with Orthodox inhabitants (the Serbian town), developed to the north and east of the current Trajan Square, and "German Fabric" (the German town), a smaller settlement to the south, centered around School Street and primarily inhabited by Germans. After Timișoara was proclaimed a royal free city (1781), these districts were united into one. Fabric experienced a remarkable development in the first half of the 19th century. In the middle of that century, 53.04% of the entire civilian population of Timișoara lived in Fabric.

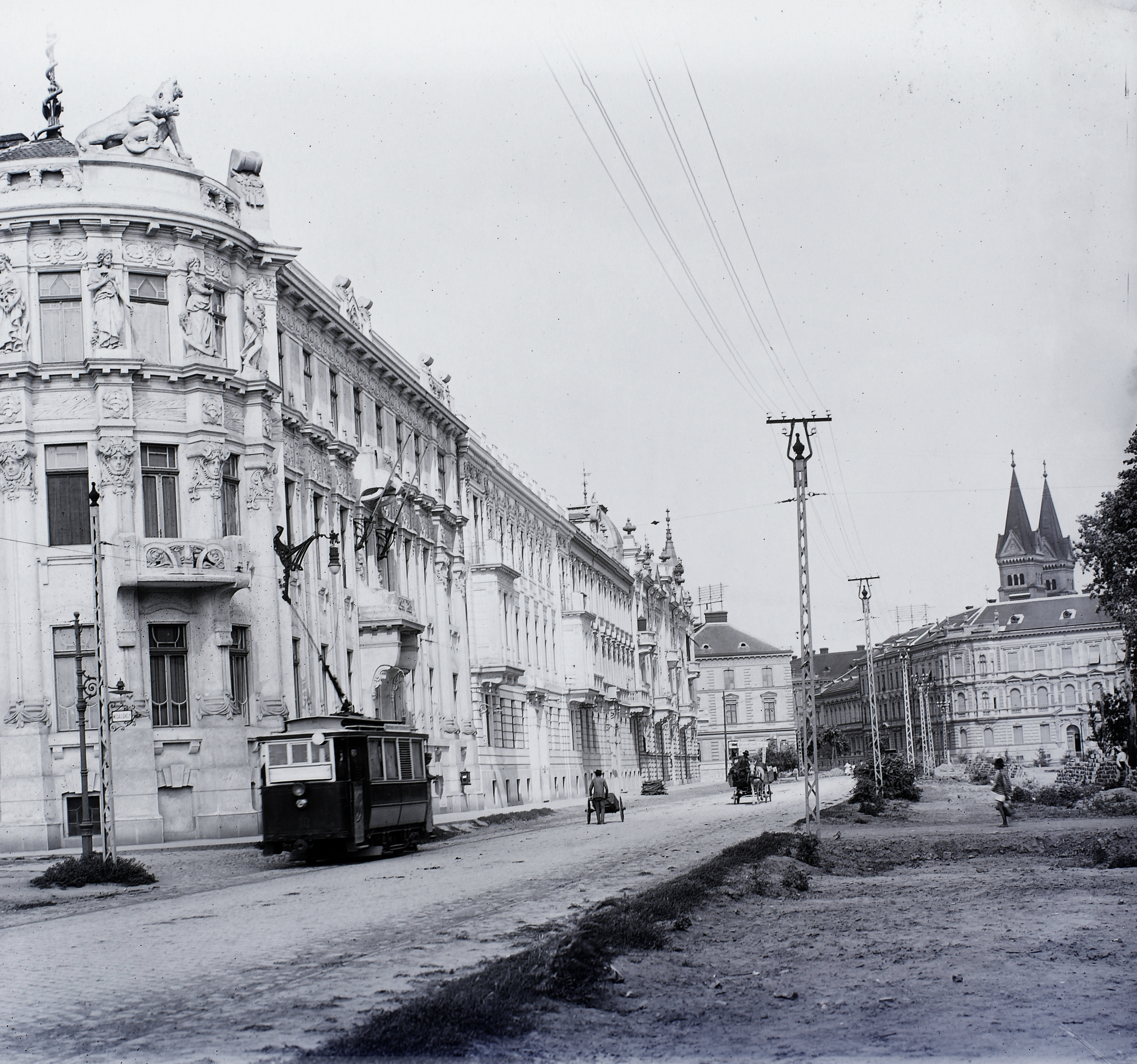
3 August 1919 Boulevard, former Hunyadi út, in 1904

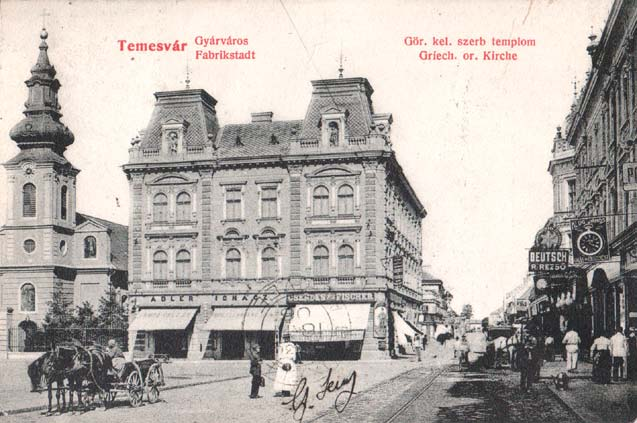
Trajan Square, with the House of the Serb Community and the St. George Serbian Church, early 20th century

The entire district was restructured between 1901 and 1903, following university professor László Szesztay's plans, thus proposing the connections between Fabric and Cetate districts. The old bridges made of wood or iron from the 19th century were replaced by reinforced concrete bridges at the beginning of the 20th century. This is how the Decebal, Dacilor and Mihai Viteazul bridges were built. The Bega Canal received a new course by 1910 as well.

Even if the district initially enjoyed a particular multiculturalism, this was removed when the communist regime came to power. Most of the district's ethnic groups, largely represented by wealthy people, emigrated, while their housing was nationalized and then transformed into social housing, offered to the poor social class with limited financial resources. As such, many of the historic buildings in the Fabric district have deteriorated over time, with only 10% of the buildings having been restored as of 2020. Similarly, as Trajan Square shifted from being a bustling commercial hub—hosting food markets and trade fairs—to a space primarily used for promenades, the area began to lose much of its economic vitality. By the 1990s, it had declined into a zone filled with low-quality shops, many of which went bankrupt in rapid succession. In the 1970s, industrial zones made up 28.5% of the district's total area, yet only 6.5% of that had been developed during the interwar and post-war periods. Technological advancements and the constant search for more affordable spaces pushed industries to relocate to the city's outskirts, leaving large portions of the district abandoned. This shift resulted in a loss of both identity and economic lifelines. Today, only about a third of the original industrial facilities remain active—most notably two major complexes: the Beer Factory, established in 1718 as Romania's first, and the CET. The rest are either in various states of decay or have been repurposed.

== Multiculturalism ==
During the Habsburg rule, Fabric was divided by ethnicity: Romanians lived in Vlașca Mare, Serbs in Old Fabric and Germans in German Fabric. Gypsies, called Neue Banater (lit. "new Banat people"), settled in the so-called "New World" (German: Neue Welt) in 1753, near the present-day East Station. Italians, French and Spaniards, who traded in rice, silk and wine, also worked in Fabric. Greeks, Armenians, Jews and Czechs settled here in the Belle Époque.

== Historical monuments ==
The built-up areas that border the main squares of the district – Trajan Square and Romans' Square – are protected urban sites of national importance. Most of the buildings in the Fabric district are monumental buildings with a considerable cultural-historical heritage, with commercial services generally located on the ground floor. Some of the representative buildings include:

- Moorish Synagogue (1889)
- Mercury Palace (1909)
- Millennium Church, (1901), the largest Roman Catholic church in Timișoara
- Neptune Palace (1914), former public baths
- Serbian Community House (1895)
- St. Elijah Church (1913)
- St. George Serbian Church (1755), one of the oldest churches in Timișoara
- Ștefania Palace (1909)
- Timișoreana Brewery (1718), the first brewery in Romania
- the Waterworks (1910), one of the oldest hydropower plants in Romania
