= Georgije Popović =

Christian Bishop

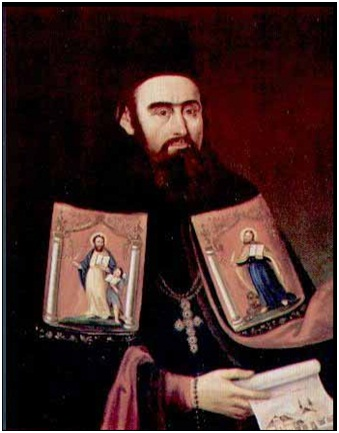

Georgije Popović (Serbian Cyrillic: Георгије Поповић; 1699 – 12 December 1754) was the Orthodox Metropolitan of Niš (1735-1740), and then the Bishop of Timișoara (1745-1754 or 1757).

He was born in 1701 in Stari Vlah. On 3 August 1735, Patriarch Arsenije IV Jovanović Šakabenta appointed him Metropolitan of Niš. Having fled to Austria together with Arsenij IV, in 1745 he managed to become the bishop of Timișoara. He built the episcopal residence in Timișoara, the Cathedral of the Ascension of the Lord, then, in 1750, a triptych for the Studenica monastery, and in 1751 he painted the altar space of the Krušedol monastery. He died on 1 December 1754 and was buried in the Serbian Orthodox Cathedral in Timișoara.

In the book Life and Connections, Dositej Obradović presented him as a free-minded and enlightened thinker. He writes that Bishop Georgije (Popović) interpreted Jesus' parable about the tree and its fruits ("Know the tree of its fruit ... the barren tree is cut down and thrown into the fire") against unmarried, unemployed, and begging Serbian monks, which should be abolished, and "monastic to settle the estates of the family and to convert the monasteries into schools, hospitals, and orphanages. "

== Metropolitan of Niš and Bela Crkva ==
Georgije became Metropolitan of Nis and Bela Crkva on August 5, 1735. He was ordained a metropolitan by the Serbian patriarch Arsenije IV Jovanović Šakabenta.

There is a berat (decree) issued by the Ottoman Sultan Mahmud I during the appointment of Georgije as bishop. The decree states: Sultan Mahmud, son of Sultan Mustafa, at the suggestion of Patriarch Arsenije in 1148 in Turkish year, or in 1735 in Kaur year, gives a berat, in which he recommends to all Turkish authorities not to interfere with the Metropolitan of Niš when he goes to buy peace in his diocese and allows the metropolitan to carry an episcopal patarica (dress) on that journey.

After he became Metropolitan of Georgia, he settled in Nis, in the episcopal court next to the church of St. Nicholas of Myra, which was built by the previous Metropolitan of Ioannina. In 1737, at the beginning of March, a meeting was held between Patriarch Arsenij, Bishop Jeftimije of Raška, Atanasije of Štip, and Simeon who came from Samokov, at which it was agreed to raise a popular uprising and support the war between Austria and Russia against Turkey. An envoy of Metropolitan Georgije also attended this meeting. It is known that Georgije supported the uprising, as well as that his envoy Radoje Milaković informed the Austrian army about the state of the Turkish army.

After the outbreak of the war, the Austrian army reached Nis and conquered it. During the conquest of the town of Georgije Popović, he was in the Monastery of St. John the Baptist near Gornji Matejevac. He called on the people to revolt and be loyal to the Habsburgs and to help the Austrians in the war.

== Transition to the Habsburg monarchy ==
After the withdrawal of the Austrians, the Second Migration of Serbs began in fear of Turkish retaliation. Niš was evacuated on 25 October 1737. With Patriarch Arsenije IV Jovanović Šakabenta, Metropolitan Georgije of Niš, as well as the bishops of Užice and Raška, set out to retreat to the north.

After he came to Austria, Georgije found himself in Sremski Karlovci. There he helped Patriarch Arsenij IV and was a member of the consistory (church court) of the Karlovac metropolitanate. He wanted to get the episcopate to manage, but that was prevented by the debt that the Metropolitan of Nis had towards the lenders. The debt arose so that the previous metropolitan Joanikije took on debt for the purpose of the new metropolitanate. The Turks asked Austria not to grant him an episcopate until he settled his debt. Only after the intervention of the patriarch, the debt was attributed to the new Metropolitan of Niš.

In 1742, Patriarch Arsenije IV held a conference in Karlovac with archbishops and Serbian leaders in Austria. Georgije (although a former) "Metropolitan of Niš" also took part in the gathering. After the death of the Bishop of Lepavina Simeon Filipović (1743), Patriarch Arsenija wanted to appoint Metropolitan Georgije as the new bishop of the Lepavina Diocese, but the people did not agree (and the Austrian court!) with this decision because Georgije was uneducated and did not know German and Latin.

== Bishop of Timișoara ==
After the death of Nikola Dimitrijević, Bishop of Timișoara, on 24 February 1745, Maria Theresa confirmed the appointment of Georgije Popović as Bishop of the Diocese of Timișoara. While he was a bishop, he built the Cathedral Church in Timișoara, the episcopal court, a school for youth, and a school for the education of parish priests on the Unification Square.

During his administration, the Diocese of Timișoara included a large part of Banat, while a smaller part was part of the Diocese of Vršac. In the north, it bordered the Arad diocese, from which it was separated by the lower course of the river Moriš. The river Tisa, in the west, divided it from the Episcopate of Bačka, the Danube, in the southwest, from the Srem diocese, and in the south, from the Belgrade metropolitanate, which in his time belonged to the Ottoman Empire. The land border towards the Vršac episcopate started from Kovin on the Danube, following the borders of the Pančevo, Čakovo, Lugoško-Fačet, and Lipovo districts, with certain deviations. In the east, it reached the western slopes of the Carpathian Mountains, and then, towards the north, it erupted into the Moriš River, upstream from the town of Lipovo.

Georgije was met by Dositej Obradović, who mentions him in his work Life and Connections.

== Death ==
Georgije Popović died in Timișoara on 2 December 1757, at six o'clock in the morning. He was buried in the Serbian Orthodox Cathedral at Timișoara, and the protocol of the funeral was written by the priest Pavle Kamenski, a parish priest from Timișoara (a Russian by birth). At his request, his body was embalmed. His funeral was attended by the most prominent personalities in Timișoara.

There is a portrait of Georgije Popović by an unknown painter, which is the oldest painting by a Metropolitan of Niš. The original from the end of the 18th century has been lost, but a copy from the beginning of the 19th century has been preserved and is kept in the episcopal court in Timișoara.

== Sources ==
- Painting of the Diocese of Timișoara
- Georgije Popović, Metropolitan of Niš and Bela Crkva
- Dositej Obradović: "Life and Connections", in the Anthology of Serbian Literature
