= Trajan Square, Timișoara =

Square in Timișoara, Romania

Trajan Square
- City square
- {{{other_names}}}
- Piața Traian
- Former name: Hauptplatz • Kossuth tér
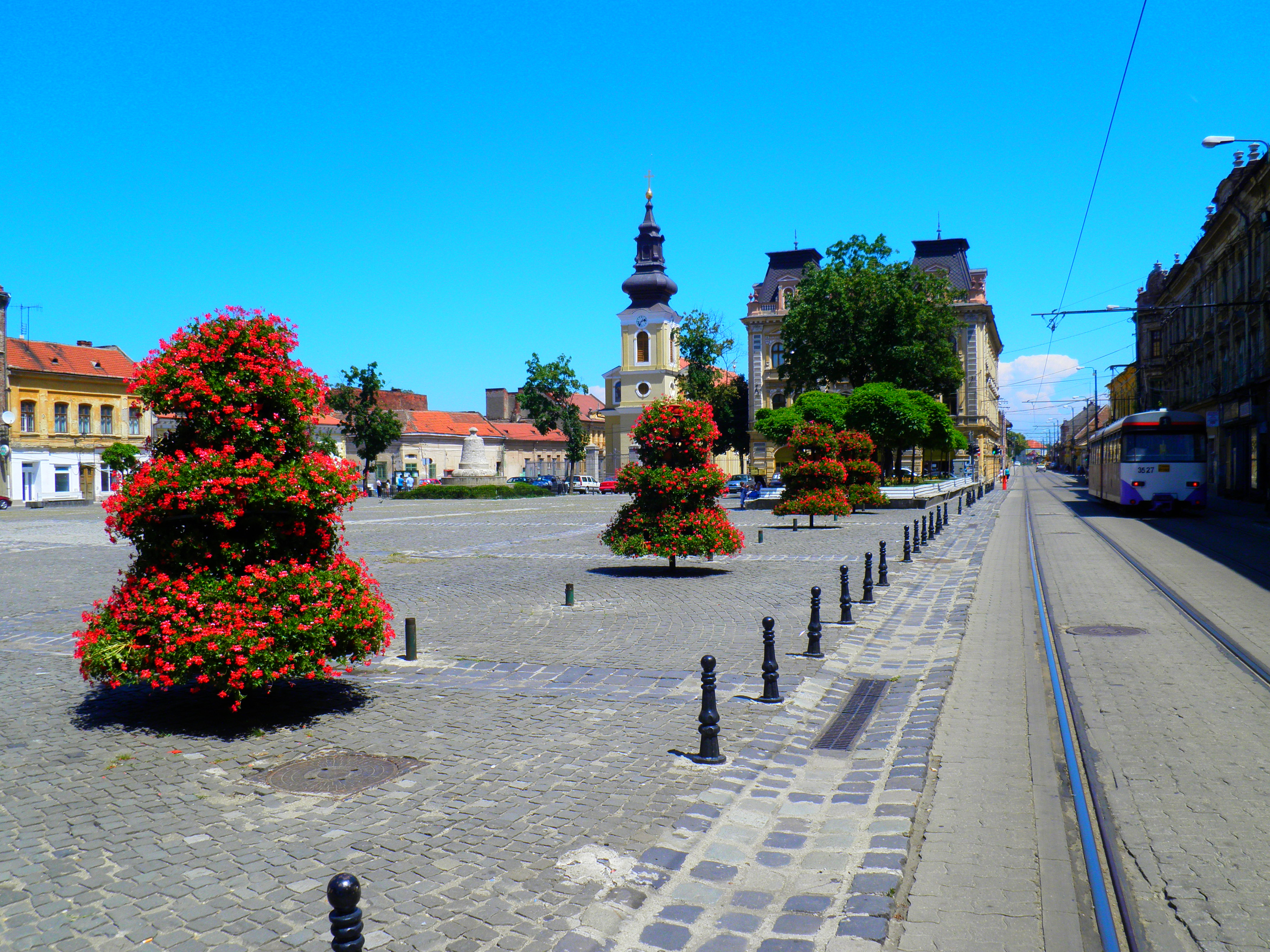
- Length: 307.15 m
- Owner: Timișoara City Hall
- Location: Timișoara, Romania
- Interactive map of Trajan Square
- Coordinates: 45°45′27.81″N 21°14′59.9″E

Trajan Square (Romanian: Piața Traian) is a square in the center of the historic district Fabric in Timișoara. It was designed by military engineers in the 1740s and is a smaller replica of the Union Square.

== Name ==
During the Austrian Empire, Trajan Square was called Hauptplatz. As a result of the Austro-Hungarian Compromise of 1867, this name was translated into Hungarian: Fő tér. From the mid-1890s the square was named after the Hungarian national hero Lajos Kossuth, who died in 1894. It got its current name after the partition of Banat in 1919.

== History ==
In 1734 there were only the trails of the present-day Dacians' and Stephen the Great streets, which were not yet bordered by buildings. The current square was drawn in 1744 in its original shape as a rectangular square of about 115 × 70 m. It was the center of the Orthodox district Rascian Fabric.

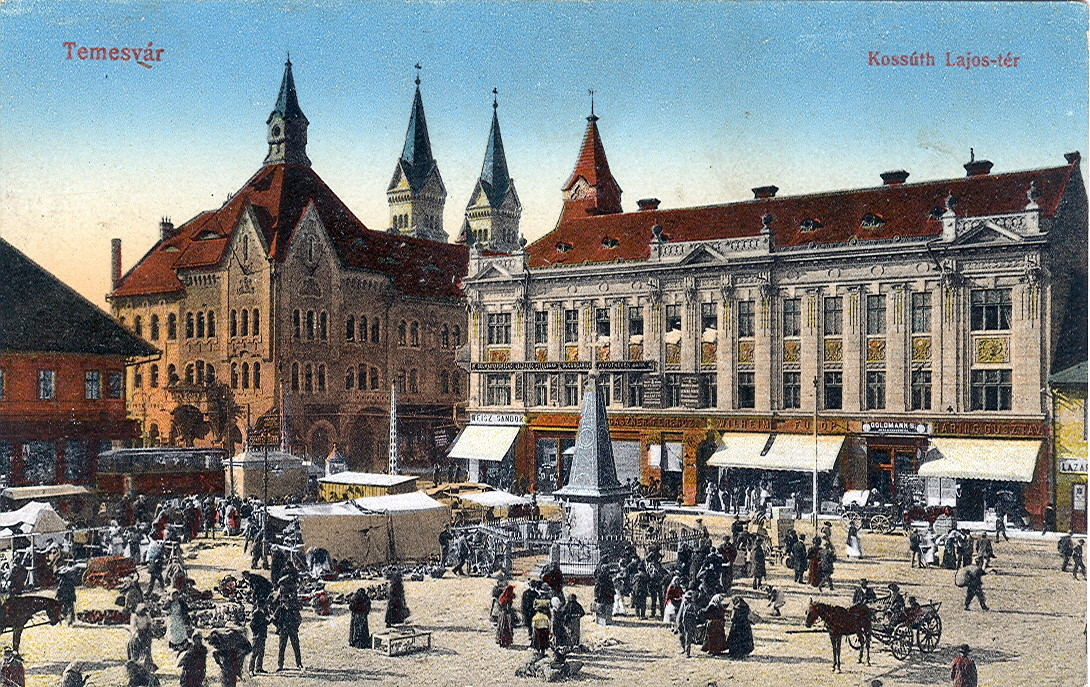
Lajos Kossuth Square (now Trajan Square) around 1914

Until late 18th century, Trajan Square had fronts made up of isolated houses with only a ground floor, with a rural aspect, probably many of these houses being made of beaten clay. It was not until the 19th century that continuous fronts were built both in the square and along the adjacent streets. One-storey buildings also appeared in the 19th century; Trajan Square thus acquires an urban character. If during mid-19th century there were only houses with a ground floor or one floor, towards the end of the century there were also two-storey houses. Around the 1900s, the buildings that dominate the square today are built: the House of the Serbian Community (built in 1895), the House of Countess Mirbach (built in 1905), the Mercury House (also known as Béla Fiatska House, built in 1909) and the Municipality Tenement House (named after 1918 Ștefania Palace, built in 1910). From an architectural point of view, the House of the Serbian Community belongs to the eclectic/historicist style typical for the second half of the 19th century, and all the other buildings to different currents of the Art Nouveau style. Two public monuments are also located in Trajan Square: the obelisk or pyramid with a cross, erected in 1774 by the Timișoara high official Stojša Spasojević, and the stone bell, the work of the sculptor Ștefan Călărășanu, erected in honor of the 1989 Revolution.

The square functioned as the site of weekly fairs and the regular daily market of the Fabric district. On fair days, it attracted hundreds of shoppers not only from Timișoara but also from Transylvania and the Ottoman Empire. Trajan Square thus operated as the principal commercial hub of a suburb that, until around 1900, maintained a considerable degree of independence from the city center. The expression "All good things come from Fabric" encapsulated the area's reputation in the 19th century. Until the interwar period, it remained a highly dynamic economic zone, characterized by a wide variety of shops.
