= Roman Catholic Episcopal Palace of Timișoara =

Roman Catholic Episcopal Palace
- Palatul Episcopal Romano-Catolic
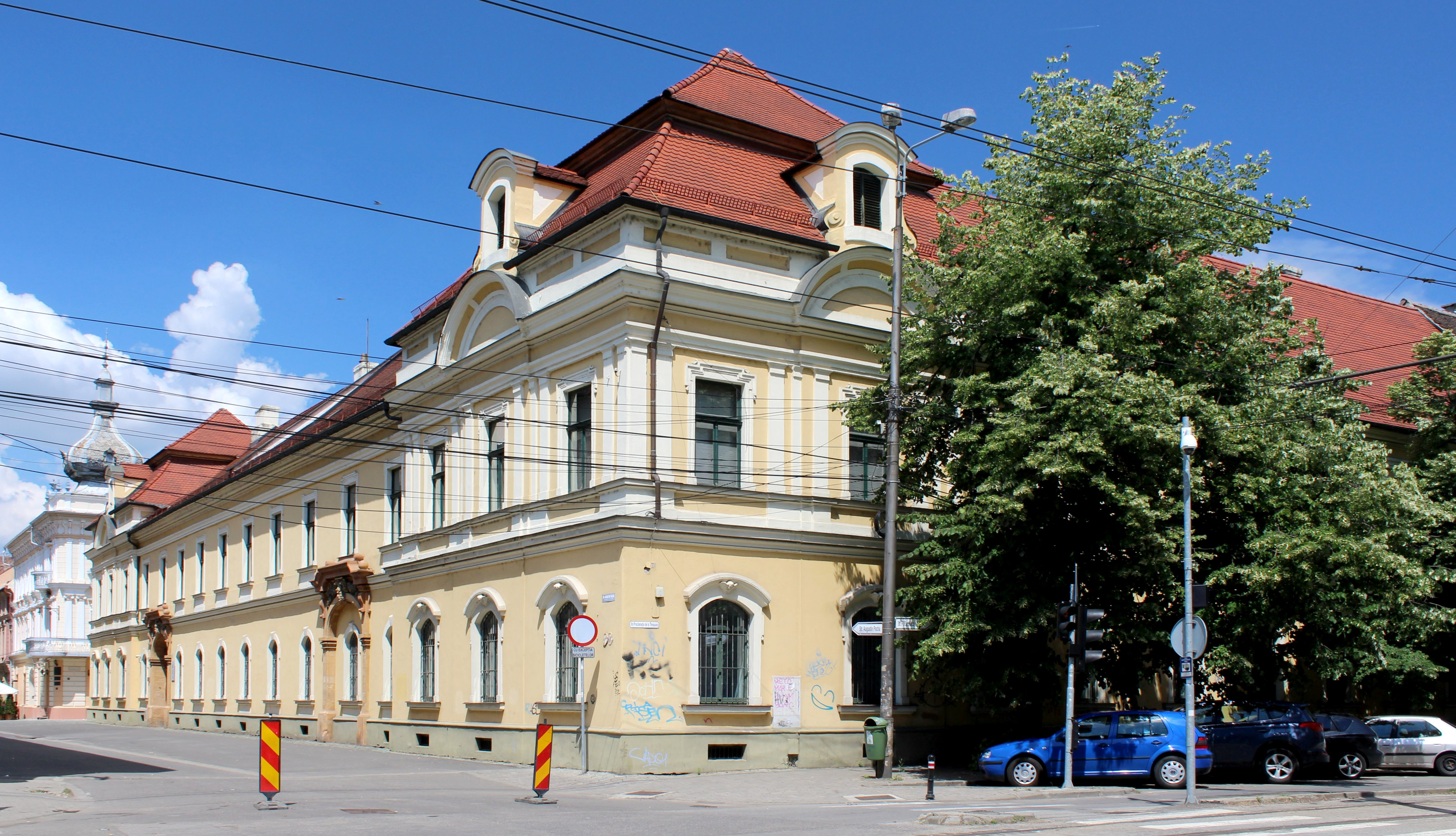
- Interactive map of the Roman Catholic Episcopal Palace area
- Former names: New Provincial House

General information
- Architectural style: Baroque
- Location: Timișoara, Romania
- Coordinates: 45°45′22″N 21°13′48″E
- Construction started: 1743
- Completed: 1752
- Renovated: 1890
- Owner: Diocese of Timișoara

Design and construction
- Architect: Ignaz Johann Cetto

The Roman Catholic Episcopal Palace (Romanian: Palatul Episcopal Romano-Catolic) is a historical monument in Timișoara, Romania. It was built between 1743 and 1752, the building being donated to the Diocese of Csanád by Empress Maria Theresa. From 1783, the building became the permanent residence of the Catholic bishop. In 1930 it became a property of the new Roman Catholic Diocese of Timișoara. Confiscated during communism, the building was returned to the Catholic Church after 1990, which opened a museum here in 1995, where statues, paintings and other religious exhibits can be seen.

== Background ==
The Diocese of Timișoara, erected in 1930, is considered the partial successor (for its Romanian part) of the diocese of Cenad, established since 1030. The first bishop was Gerard Sagredo, who was killed by pagan rebels in Buda in 1046; he was sanctified, and since then the hill that rises steeply above the Danube in Budapest bears his name: Gellért-hegy (Gerard's hill).

The most difficult period for this diocese was the Turkish occupation. After the establishment of the Austrian administration in 1716 and the arrival of many Catholic colonists, the seat was moved to Timișoara. Between 1716 and 1918, monks from several Catholic orders arrived in Timișoara – Jesuits, Franciscans, Piarists, Misericordians, the School Sisters of Notre Dame, Salvatorians; these orders had a great influence on the development of the city in the 18th–19th centuries, some (the Salvatorians) are still active today.

A second difficult period began with communism. Catholic orders were banned, Bishop Augustin Pacha was imprisoned and the diocese itself was abolished – until 1990 it functioned as a deanery. It was reactivated after 1990; some of the former properties of the diocese, scattered throughout the city, have been retroceded in recent years.

Typical for the Catholic diocese of Timisoara is the extremely heterogeneous ethnic composition of the believers: Hungarians, Germans, Romanians, Croatians, Slovaks, Bulgarians, Czechs, Italians, etc.

== History ==
The episcopal residence of the diocese was in Cenad until the middle of the 16th century. It was destroyed during the Ottoman occupation. After the liberation of Banat from the rule of the Ottoman Empire, for a short time (1710–1730), the bishops of Cenad carried out their activity in Szeged, however, already on 7 August 1723, an imperial decree was issued ordering the construction of an episcopal residence in Timișoara, with help from the Treasury, and – implicitly – the relocation of the diocesan seat in the city. Despite this fact, until April 1726, nothing was done in this regard, a fact that led Bishop Ladislaus Nádasd to address a request to expedite the construction of the episcopal residence. On 30 May 1731, based on an aulic decree, the fund for the episcopal residence was established. Bishop Adalbert von Falkenstein, who arrived in Timișoara, did not use this fund, but lived for a period of time in the residence of the Jesuit monks (St. George Square), and then settled in the House of Count Claude Florimond de Mercy, the first governor of Banat, which, in part, served as his temporary residence. On May 10, 1738, Emperor Charles VI reiterated his earlier decree for the construction of an episcopal palace, but due to the new war with the Turks, the works were not started immediately. The bishop, the canons and the diocesan administration were thus forced to live and carry out their work provisionally in various locations.

The current building of the palace was passed into the possession of the diocese of Cenad on 2 June 1780, through an imperial decree signed by Maria Theresa. The measure was planned in advance, because the architect Ignaz Johann Cetto received in 1773 the task of adapting a building used by a civil office (i.e., the Salt Office and/or Fiscal Office) into an episcopal palace. The beginning of its construction seems to be dated to 1743, as it was not yet highlighted in the city plans from 1733 and 1745. On the plans from 1758, signed by the engineer Carl Steinlein, the building appears with a clear delimitation of its two components, the northwestern half and the southeastern one. Part of the northeastern half – called the New Provincial House (German: Neues Provinzialhaus) – is already thought of as a functional episcopal residence, and the southeastern part is inhabited by a councilor for constructions from the provincial administration, also here being positioned the adjacent chancellery.

The building has served continuously as an episcopal residence since 1780. One of the canons of the Cathedral Chapter also had his seat here, who used about half of the building. However, in 1809, Bishop Ladislaus Kőszeghy, having the sum of 3,500 florins, convinced the Treasury to support with an amount equal to his the purchase of another building intended for the chapter, so that the canon moved to another location, and the bishop stayed together with the members of the Episcopal Curia in the building on Caroligasse (Charles Street). By this approach, Bishop Köszeghy practically bought back from the state administration the half of the building, which was still unused and not yet directly owned by the diocese.

With the appointment of Bishop Alexander Dessewffy in 1889, he orders the complete renovation of the edifice, the redevelopment and beautification of the rooms, on which occasion the entrance from the southwestern side of the edifice is closed. In 1890, the episcopal archive was set up in the resulting space. The final cost of the general renovation of the building amounted to 42,000 guilders. During this period, the floor above the eastern wing was also completed, where several rooms, more modest in size, were arranged. The ground floor of the western wing and only two rooms on the first floor had already been built previously, being already included in a plan from 1852. These rooms, on the ground floor, were intended for the household needs of the episcopal residence: the laundry room, the coachman's residence, the horse stables and the storage place of the carriage with the shed.

During Emperor Franz Joseph I's visit to Timișoara in 1891, he was hosted in this building.

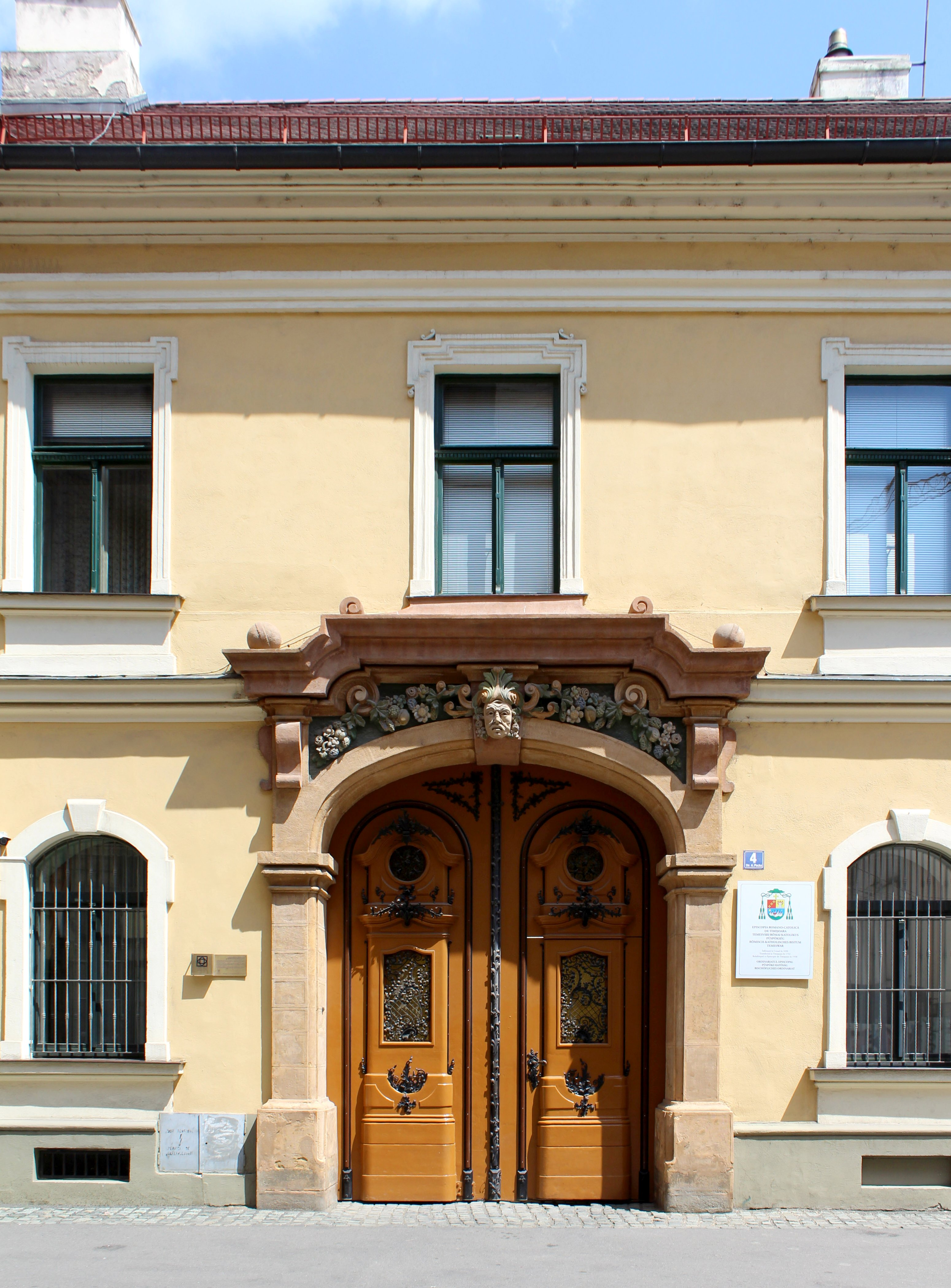
The baroque portal of the entrance

Over the centuries, the episcopal residence housed important cultural institutions: the episcopal chapel, with some religious objects donated by the Austrian prime minister, Prince Klemens von Metternich, the episcopal library, founded by bishop Josef Lonovics, counting about 5,000 volumes and the diocesan archive, with documents starting from the period of the liberation of Banat from the Turks.

In the summer of 1950, shortly after the arrest, in Carașova, of Bishop Augustin Pacha by Securitate officers, the episcopal palace was confiscated by the authorities, being considered to be part of the bishop's "personal wealth". Some clerics managed to file a lawsuit through which the episcopal palace would be retroceded to the rightful owner. Consequently, in 1954 the episcopal palace was retroceded to the "Roman Catholic Deanery" (the only official name recognized by the state, under which the diocese was allowed to function, without a bishop at its head, throughout the communist dictatorship). However, the retrocession was made with private tenants or businesses hosted by the regime in the historic building. Only after 1990, the tenants could be relocated to other edifices of the diocese or left voluntarily to other housing units. During the almost fifty years of communism, the various state institutions, as well as private tenants, caused irreparable damage and destruction to the building, significant damage was recorded to the architectural elements, such as the carved portal of the entrance, to the terracotta stoves and the fireplaces in the rooms, to the hand-carved baroque frames of the interior doors.

After the tenants were successfully moved, but also while they were about to leave, the episcopal palace was subjected to thorough and complete renovations. The documentation work was already started in 1990, the renovation being carried out with difficulty due to the size of the edifice and the necessary financial effort. On 24 September 1994, the Episcopal Palace returned to its centuries-old destination in a public ceremony attended by public figures of the city, representatives of all other religions, the army and the offices of culture and heritage.

== Architecture ==
The Roman Catholic Episcopal Palace is one of the most representative baroques buildings in Timișoara, although some of the original details disappeared with the transformations and renovations from the late-19th century and afterwards. From an architectural point of view, it is a building with a ground floor and a first floor whose façade is punctuated only by the simple rectangular windows. Remarkable is the baroque portal, with some rococo elements, which emphasizes the entrance to the building, on Pacha Street. The gate is provided with a rich decoration and a mascaron in the keystone, above it. The building, at the four corners, had pavilion constructions protruding from the façade, reminiscent of the corner towers of castles, of which only two have been preserved, at the corners of Pacha Street.

The building houses eight Secession-style stained glass medallions made in 1914 by Miksa Róth for the chapel of the Roman Catholic Theological Seminary (today the dormitory of the University of Medicine). They were saved during the confiscation in 1947 and hidden for a long time in the St. George Cathedral in Union Square.
