= Ormós House =

- Casa Ormós
- Interactive map of the Ormós House area
- Etymology: Zsigmond Ormós

General information
- Architectural style: Historicist
- Location: 7 Bishop Augustin Pacha Street, Timișoara
- Coordinates: 45°45′25″N 21°13′46″E
- Current tenants: Library of the Timișoara Branch of the Romanian Academy
- Inaugurated: 29 August 1891

Design and construction
- Architect: Jakab Klein

Website
- biblioteca.academiatm.ro

Ormós House (Romanian: Casa Ormós) is a historical building in Timișoara, Romania. In the past it hosted the city's first museum, and today it is the headquarters of the library of the local branch of the Romanian Academy.

== History ==
It was built on the site of the former Wellauer House, which was demolished in 1886. It was intended from the beginning as the headquarters of the Historical and Archeological Museum Society of Southern Hungary (the nucleus of the National Museum of Banat and the National Museum of Art), on the initiative of its founder Zsigmond Ormós. He organized an international public collection for the construction of the new building. Designed by local architect Jakab Klein, the building was inaugurated on 29 August 1891. Contemporary sources record that Ormós was not present at the inauguration.

In 1941, the building was repurposed from a museum to a library when the Communal Library was established. The Academy Library relocated to this building in 1953. Currently, the library holds a total of 344,669 items, including 259,323 periodicals and 85,346 books.

== Architecture ==
The building, constructed in an eclectic-historicist style typical of late 19th-century architecture, incorporates numerous elements reflecting the culture of Ancient Greece, which was Ormós' main interest. Notable features include the 2.25-meter bronze statue of Athena, flanked by Doric columns, Renaissance-style window frames, and the overall shape of the building, which evokes the design of ancient temples. In the past, several marble slabs were placed beside the statue, displaying the names of prominent figures such as Johann Joachim Winckelmann (the founder of classical archaeology), Livy (historian), Herodotus (the father of historiography), Antonio Bonfini (historian of King Matthias Corvinus), Theodor Mommsen (historian and journalist), Ferenc Pulszky (archaeologist, art historian, and director of the Hungarian National Museum), and Miklós Istvánffy (historian and politician). These slabs were lost in 1940.

The intricate details, including the large oak gate adorned with delicate wrought ironwork, the door handles, and the lighting fixtures, bear the stylistic imprint of architect Jakab Klein.
