= House of Mercy (disambiguation) =

A House of Mercy was a type of Anglican institution that operated from the mid 19th century to the mid 20th century.

House of Mercy may also refer to:

- Holy House of Mercy, historic building in Senado Square, Macau, China
- House of Mercy (cottage hospital), former hospital in Pittsfield, Massachusetts, U.S.

== See also ==
- Count Mercy House, historical monument in Timișoara, Romania
