= Adalbert Boros =

Romanian Roman Catholic prelate of Hungarian ethnicity

Dr.Dr. Adalbert (Béla) Boros (September 20, 1908 – June 6, 2003) was a Romanian Roman Catholic prelate of Hungarian ethnicity, Auxiliary Bishop of the Roman Catholic Diocese of Timișoara. Born in a Hungarian family in Pădureni, now part of Chişineu-Criş, he graduated from the Collegium Germanicum et Hungaricum in Rome and was ordained a priest in 1932. He taught philosophy and dogma at the theological seminary in Timișoara before becoming rector. In 1948, following the advent of the communist regime, he was named auxiliary bishop of Timișoara and was secretly consecrated in Bucharest. Together with Bishop Augustin Pacha and other prominent Catholics, he was arrested, given a show trial and sentenced to life imprisonment. Released in 1964, he was not allowed to perform the duties of a bishop until the fall of the regime, instead having to work as a chaplain in Timișoara. In 1990, Pope John Paul II named him titular archbishop of Ressiana. He died in 2003.
