= Baroque Palace, Timișoara =

Baroque Palace
- Palatul Baroc
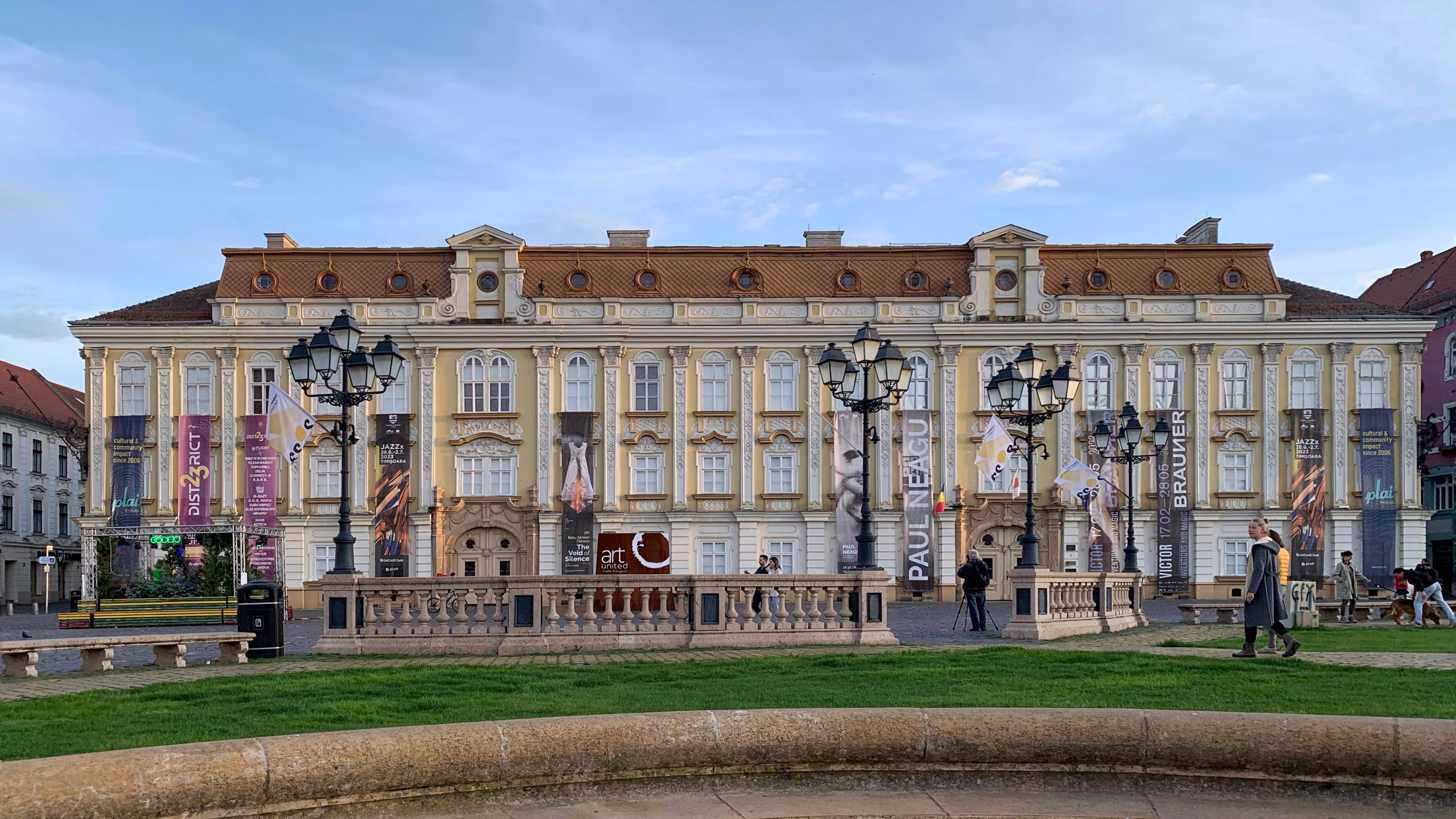
- Front facade of the Baroque Palace, facing the Union Square
- Interactive map of the Baroque Palace area

General information
- Architectural style: Baroque
- Location: Union Square, Timișoara
- Coordinates: 45°45′26″N 21°13′45″E
- Construction started: 1752
- Completed: 1754
- Renovated: 2006
- Owner: Timișoara National Museum of Art

Design and construction
- Architect: Franz Anton Hillebrandt

The Baroque Palace (Romanian: Palatul Baroc) is a monumental palace in the historic centre of the Romanian city of Timișoara. One of the representative buildings of 18th-century Timișoara, the Baroque Palace today houses the city's National Museum of Art (Romanian: Muzeul Național de Artă). The richly decorated palace consists of two floors and a mansard, as well as two entrance gates, designed in the Viennese Baroque style. The Baroque Hall on the first floor hosted festivities occasioned by the visits of emperors (Joseph II, Franz Joseph I, etc.), kings (Ferdinand I, etc.) and prelates, as well as important cultural figures (such as musicians Franz Liszt, Johannes Brahms, Pablo Sarasate, George Enescu, etc.).

== History ==
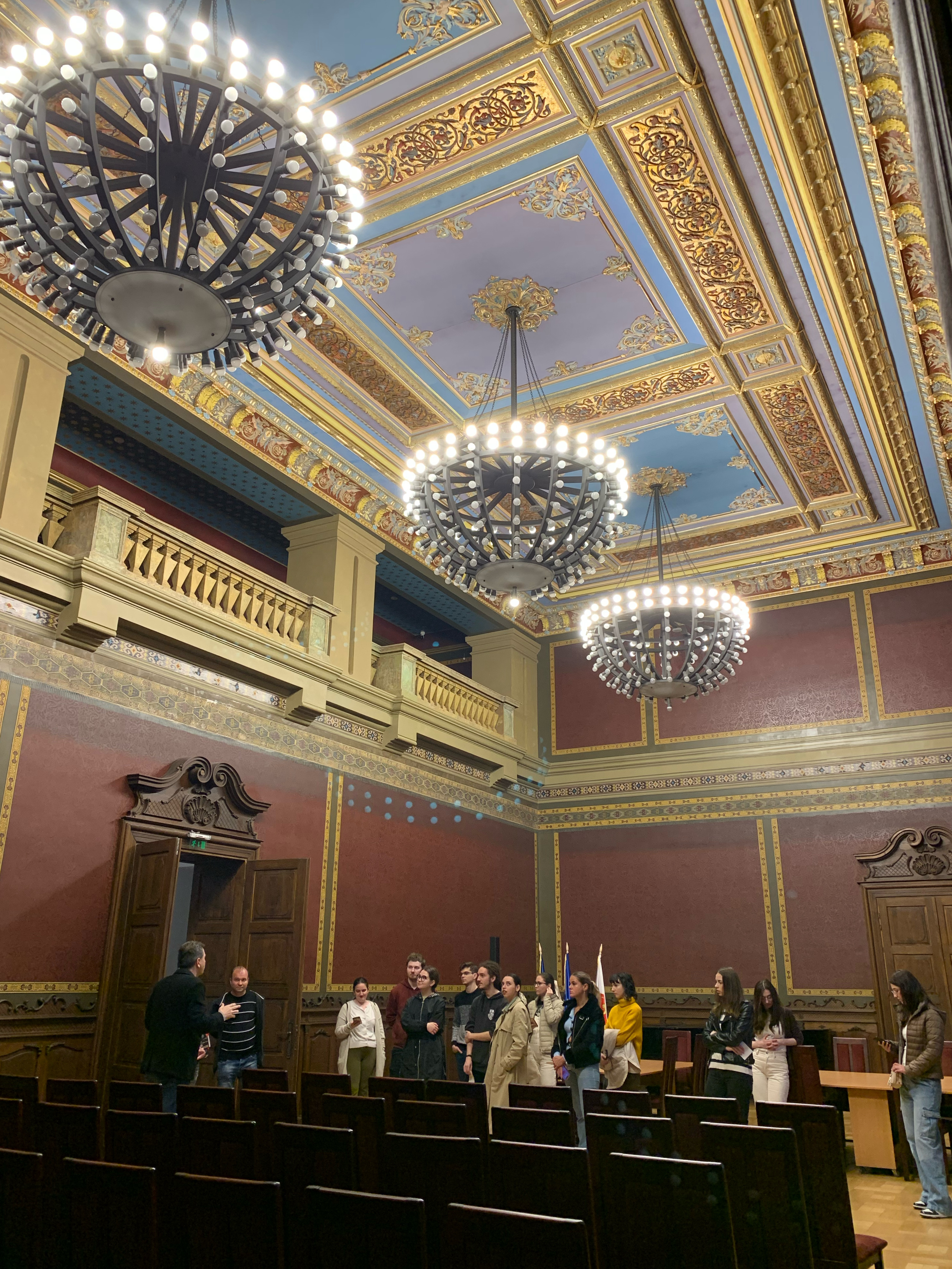
Baroque Hall (Romanian: Sala Barocă)

After the defeat of the Ottomans, who ruled Timișoara for 164 years, the House of Habsburg imposed a rigorously planned urban concept, with a rectangular street network in which the city's representative squares were built. Throughout the 18th century, buildings were designed and built in their perimeter. Although it was only in 1751 that the chamber administration was separated from the military administration and the office of civilian president of Banat was established, already in the 1730s–1740s the Austrian military engineers proposed the construction of a residence that would belong to the civilian governor. In the same period, the locations of the Roman Catholic Cathedral (built in 1736–1774), the Serbian Orthodox Cathedral (built in 1744–1748) and the Holy Trinity Monument (built in 1739–1740) were established. The southern side of Domplatz (present-day Union Square) was chosen for the President's Palace, land on which, in 1733–1735, there were the buildings of the Mining Office and, adjacent to it, the Military Cashier's Office. The construction of the Baroque Palace began from the two buildings, joined by an overstory. Based on the nature of the ornamentation, the literature assumes a close connection to Viennese Baroque, mainly mentioning Palais Kinsky as an analogy.

In 1752, the Old Chamber House, so named after the function it had during the mixed German-Serbian administration of the city, was a building with a ground floor and two floors. In the back, towards the courtyard, there were several stables and warehouses as annexes. The ground floor had belonged to the Administration of the Banat Chancellery and the Military Cashier Service. In 1754, the Old Chamber House was set up as the residence of the first president of the civil administration, the Count of Vilana Perlas, known for a while as the President's House/Palace.

During a reconstruction in 1774, the palace was expanded with a new wing in the direction of the main square and today's Augustin Pacha Street, as if mirroring the existing building. As a result, the building was organized around two closed inner courtyards during this period, the two courtyards being separated from each other by a two-story wing. This is when the symmetrical layout of the main square facade and its double entrance are created. The two gates, which led to the two inner courtyards through arched doorways, still show the decorative forms of this period. Shortly after these transformations, the building began to be used as a county palace. After the suppression of the Hungarian Revolution in 1849 and until 1861, the building served as the administrative headquarters of the Voivodeship of Serbia and Banat of Temeschwar, and from 1861 it again functions as a county palace.

In 1885–1886, French-born architect Jacques Klein removed the Baroque elements of the building. His interventions primarily concerned the facades of the building and are decisive to this day in the appearance of the building. Also then, the wing separating the inner courtyards was demolished.

After World War II, the Faculty of Agronomy of the Polytechnic Institute functioned in the Baroque Palace, which later became the Banat University of Agricultural Sciences and Veterinary Medicine. Until 1944, the Prefecture of Timiș-Torontal County functioned here, and between 1944 and 1958, it housed the commandment of the Soviet troops stationed in Timișoara. During the communist period, it was left in disrepair, only at the end of the 1980s, the restoration of the edifice began. Since 1984, it houses the Art Department of the Museum of Banat, which became an art museum on 1 January 2006.

== Architecture ==
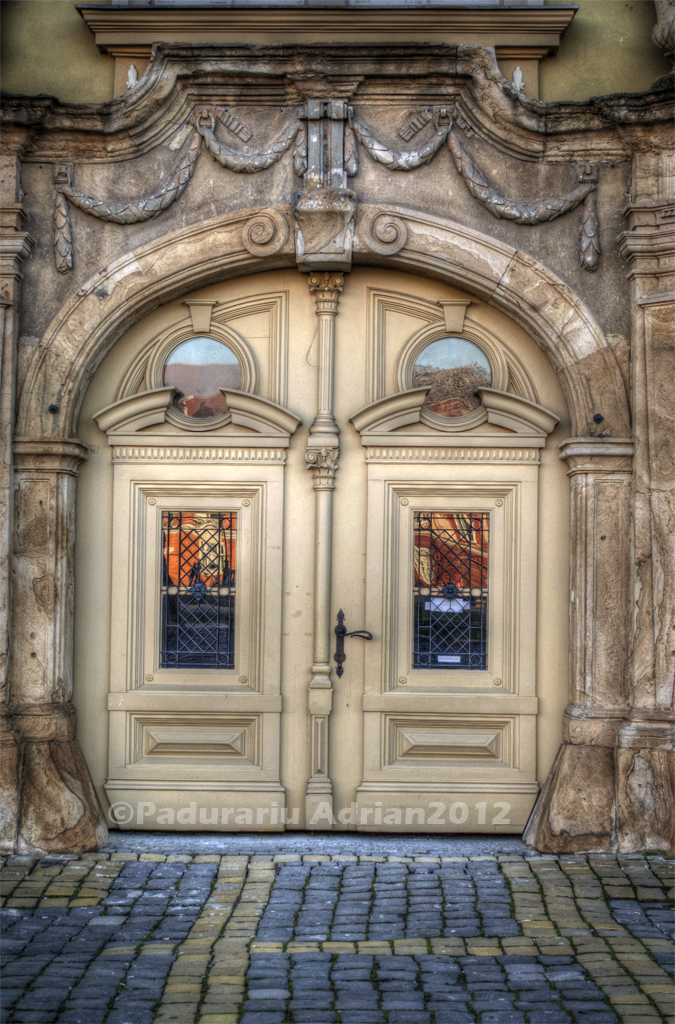
Architectural details of the entrance door

The palace offers remarkable architectural effects through portals, monumentality, as well as the arrangement of windows and pilasters that mark the facade along the entire height. The initial ornamentation was greatly altered and destroyed by subsequent modifications. The ground floor is treated as a socle with bossages, which supports the first and second floors. The floors present a rhythmic facade of pilasters on two levels (forming the so-called "colossal order"), with Corinthian-style capitals, constituting a typical composition for the architecture of Viennese Baroque palaces from the 18th century.

== National Museum of Art ==
The art museum functioned as a branch of the Museum of Banat until 2006, when it became an independent museum. Consequently, the history of the art museum is closely linked to the history of the Museum of Banat, founded in 1872 at the initiative of some local cultural figures. The nucleus of Timișoara's pinacotheca is formed by the important collection of Italian, Flemish, German, Austrian, Hungarian, and Romanian paintings, donated in 1888–1895 by Zsigmond Ormós, prominent personality of the cultural life of Timișoara, collector, art historian, one of the founders of the museum. Between 1891–1921, István Berkeszi, as custodian, then director of the Museum of Banat, was concerned with completing the patrimony through acquisitions and donations of paintings and graphics from Banat from the 19th century. The activity of Ioachim Miloia, director of the Banat Museum between 1928–1940, is responsible for the establishment of the collection of Old Romanian art (icons) and Banat art from the first half of the 20th century. The painter Aurel Ciupe, director of the museum between 1940–1948, continued the pursuits of Ioachim Miloia for the formation of a collection of modern and contemporary Romanian paintings.

Over time, the art museum was housed in different locations (Palace of Culture, Huniade Castle, the building of the current French Cultural Centre), before finally moving to the Baroque Palace in 1984.
