= Măureni =

Commune in Romania

- Commune
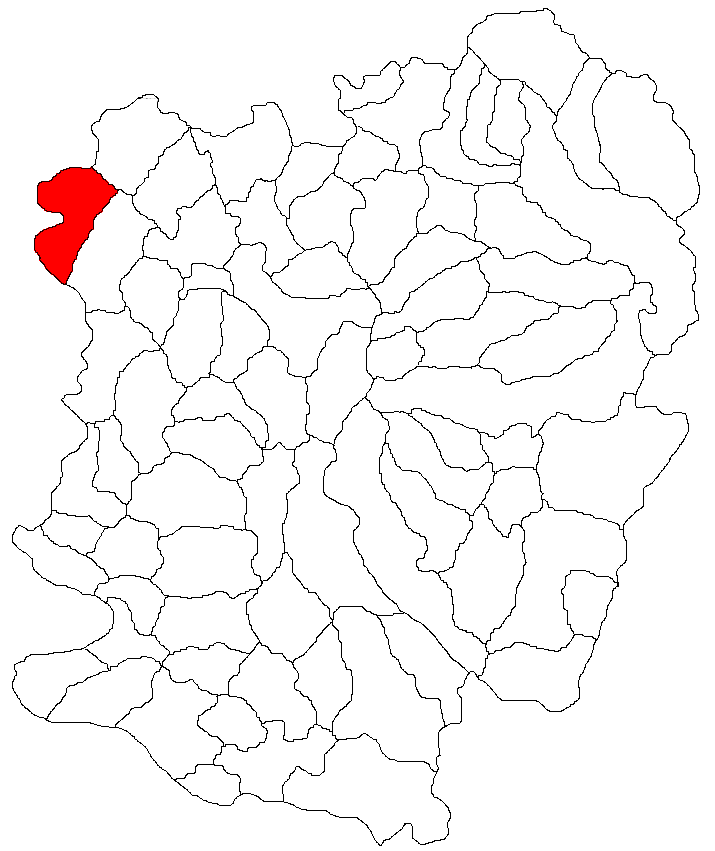
- Location in Caraș-Severin County

- Location in Romania
- Coordinates: 45°24′N 21°30′E
- Country: Romania
- County: Caraș-Severin
- Population (2021-12-01): 2,556
- Time zone: EET/EEST (UTC+2/+3)
- Vehicle reg.: CS

Măureni (also Morițfeld; German: Moritzfeld; Hungarian: Móricföld) is a commune in Caraș-Severin County, western Romania with a population of 2,579 people. It is composed of two villages, Măureni and Șoșdea (Sósd).

At the 2011 census, 97.3% of inhabitants were Romanians, 1.3% Hungarians and 1% Germans.

== Natives ==
- Augustin Pacha
