= Sebastian Kräuter =

- Bishop of Timişoara
- Church: Catholic Church
- Diocese: Diocese of Timişoara
- In office: 29 September 1983 – 24 June 1999
- Predecessor: Augustin Pacha
- Successor: Martin Roos

Orders
- Ordination: 2 June 1946 by Augustin Pacha
- Consecration: 28 April 1990 by Angelo Sodano

Personal details
- Born: 22 December 1922 Nițchidorf, Timiș-Torontal County, Kingdom of Romania
- Died: 29 January 2008 (aged 85) Timișoara, Timiș County, Romania

Sebastian Kräuter (22 December 1922, in Nițchidorf – 29 January 2008, in Timișoara) was the Roman Catholic bishop of the Timișoara diocese in Romania between 1990 and 1999.

== Biography ==
Sebastian Kräuter was the son of businessman Balthasar Kräuter and his wife Katharina. His brother, Dr. theol. Franz Kräuter, was for many years the archivist of the diocese Timișoara. His father's ancestors came from the Palatine Hauenstein and migrated in the 18th century to Banat.

Sebastian Kräuter attended elementary school in Nitzkydorf. He studied philosophy and theology at the seminary in Timișoara. He was ordained priest on 2 June 1946 at the Temeswarer Dom by bishop Augustin Pacha. Between 1946 and 1964 he was a curate at the parish Faire, and in 1983 became the pastor of the community.

Kräuter was ordained bishop of the Diocese of Timișoara on 28 April 1990 (the see was vacant since 1954, after the death of bishop Pacha). He was co-editor and author of the foreword of the 1995 biography of his predecessor, Augustin Pacha "Erinnerungen an Bischof Pacha: Ein Stück Banater Heimatgeschichte". Kräuter stepped down in 1999 in favor of Martin Roos.

Kräuter died on 29 January 2008, and was buried on 1 February 2008, in the crypt of the Timișoara Roman Catholic cathedral.
