= Martin Roos =

Romanian cleric

His Excellency Martin Roos Msgr.
- Bishop Emeritus of Timişoara
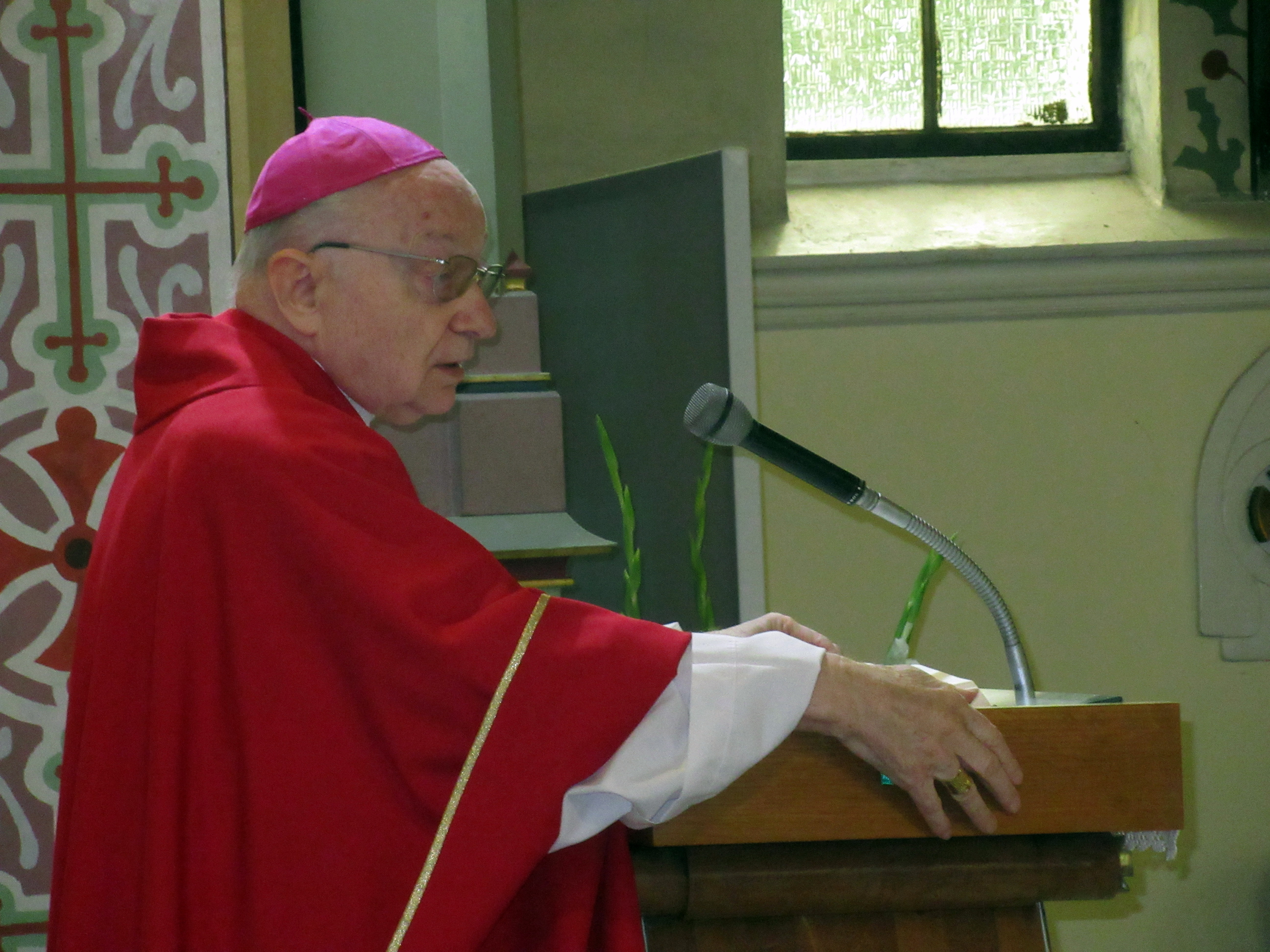
- Church: Roman Catholic
- Diocese: Roman Catholic Diocese of Timișoara
- Appointed: 24 June 1999
- Installed: 28 August 1999
- Predecessor: Sebastian Kräuter
- Successor: József-Csaba Pál

Orders
- Ordination: 3 July 1971
- Consecration: 28 August 1999 by Jean-Claude Périsset

Personal details
- Born: October 17, 1942 (age 83) Satchinez, Romania
- Coat of arms

Martin Roos (born October 17, 1942) is a Romanian cleric, bishop of the Roman Catholic Diocese of Timișoara. Born into a Banat Swabian family in Satchinez (Knees), Timiș County, he attended the cantors' school in Alba Iulia from 1957 to 1961. He began studying theology at the Roman Catholic Theological Institute of Alba Iulia in 1961, continuing from 1962 to 1969 at Königstein im Taunus in West Germany. In 1971, Carl Joseph Leiprecht ordained him a priest of the Rottenburg Diocese. From that year until 1973, he was assistant priest in Stuttgart. From 1973 to 1974 he was parish administrator in Stimpfach, becoming parish priest in 1974. Following the Romanian Revolution of 1989, his bishop, Walter Kasper, allowed him to return to his native country. In 1990, Timișoara Bishop Sebastian Kräuter named him director of the diocesan chancery. He became a Monsignor in 1991 and in 1999, following Kräuter's retirement, he was named bishop by Pope John Paul II. In May 2018, Pope Francis accepted his resignation, and appointed József-Csaba Pál as his successor.
