= Brück House =

- Romanian: Casa Brück; German: Haus Brück
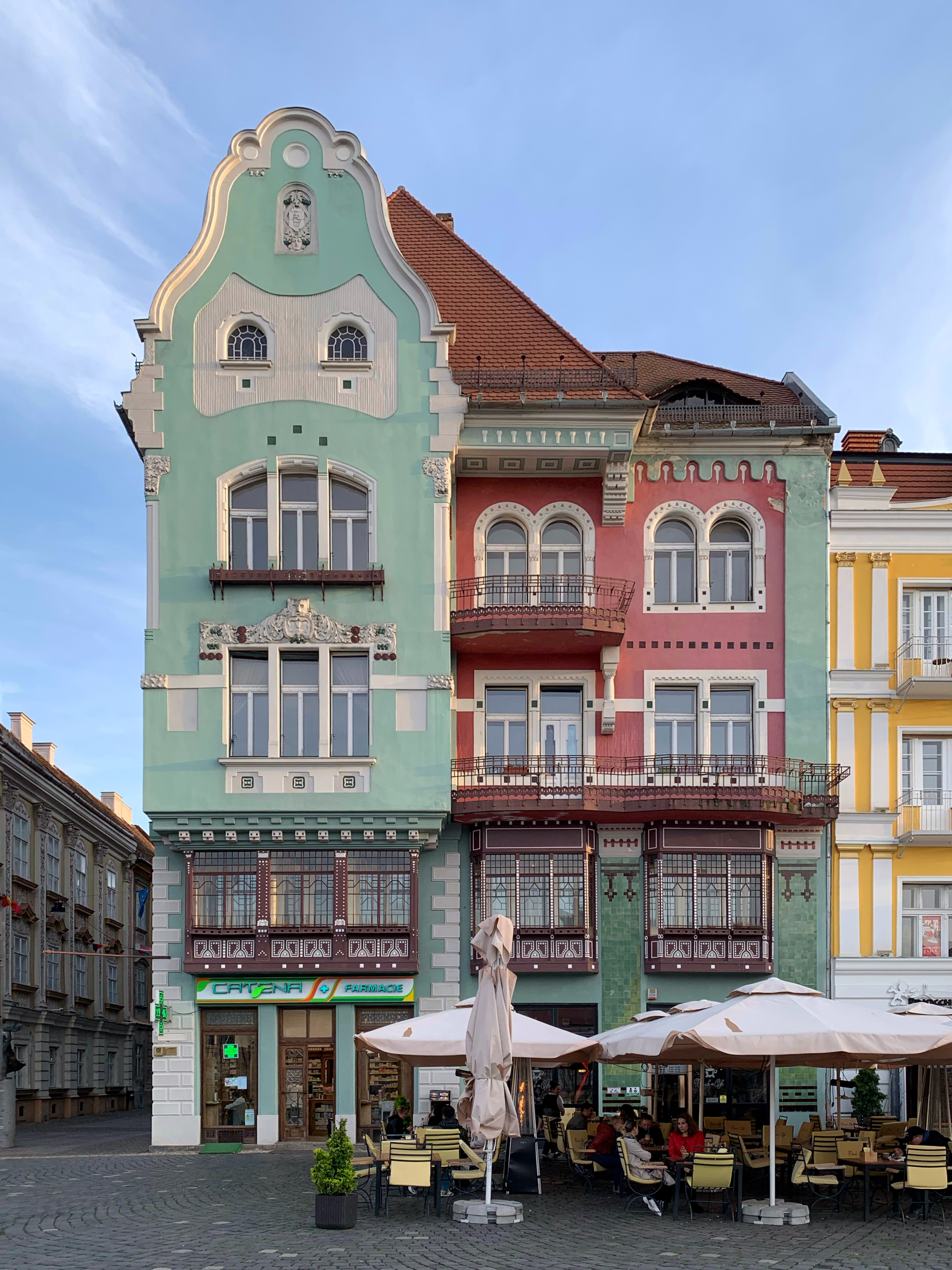
- Interactive map of the Brück House area
- Alternative names: Brück Palace

General information
- Architectural style: Secession
- Location: Union Square, Timișoara
- Coordinates: 45°45′26″N 21°13′43″E
- Construction started: 1910
- Completed: 1911
- Renovated: 2012

Technical details
- Floor count: 4

Design and construction
- Architects: László Székely; Arnold Merbl

The Brück House (Romanian: Casa Brück; German: Haus Brück) is a historic house in Timișoara's Union Square. It was designed by László Székely and Arnold Merbl in the Secession style and resembles a thin slice of cake.

== History ==
Initially, there was a pharmacy on the site of the building since 1898 and it was called Golden Cross, belonging to the Geml family (or the Zifkovich family according to other sources). It was refurbished and used in the following years by pharmacist Salamon Brück. The pharmacy still works today and much of the original furniture and display cases are still in use. The building, which was originally built in the Viennese Baroque style, was later rebuilt in the Secession style at Brück's request. The reconstruction began in 1910 according to the plans of the chief architect of Timișoara at the time, László Székely, and was completed a year later. He collaborated with the architect Arnold Merbl, who, in order to supervise the works, built a wooden shack in the area where he lived until their completion.

Falling into disrepair after 1989, the house was renovated in 2012 by an Italian businessman who bought an apartment in the building in 1999.

== Architecture ==
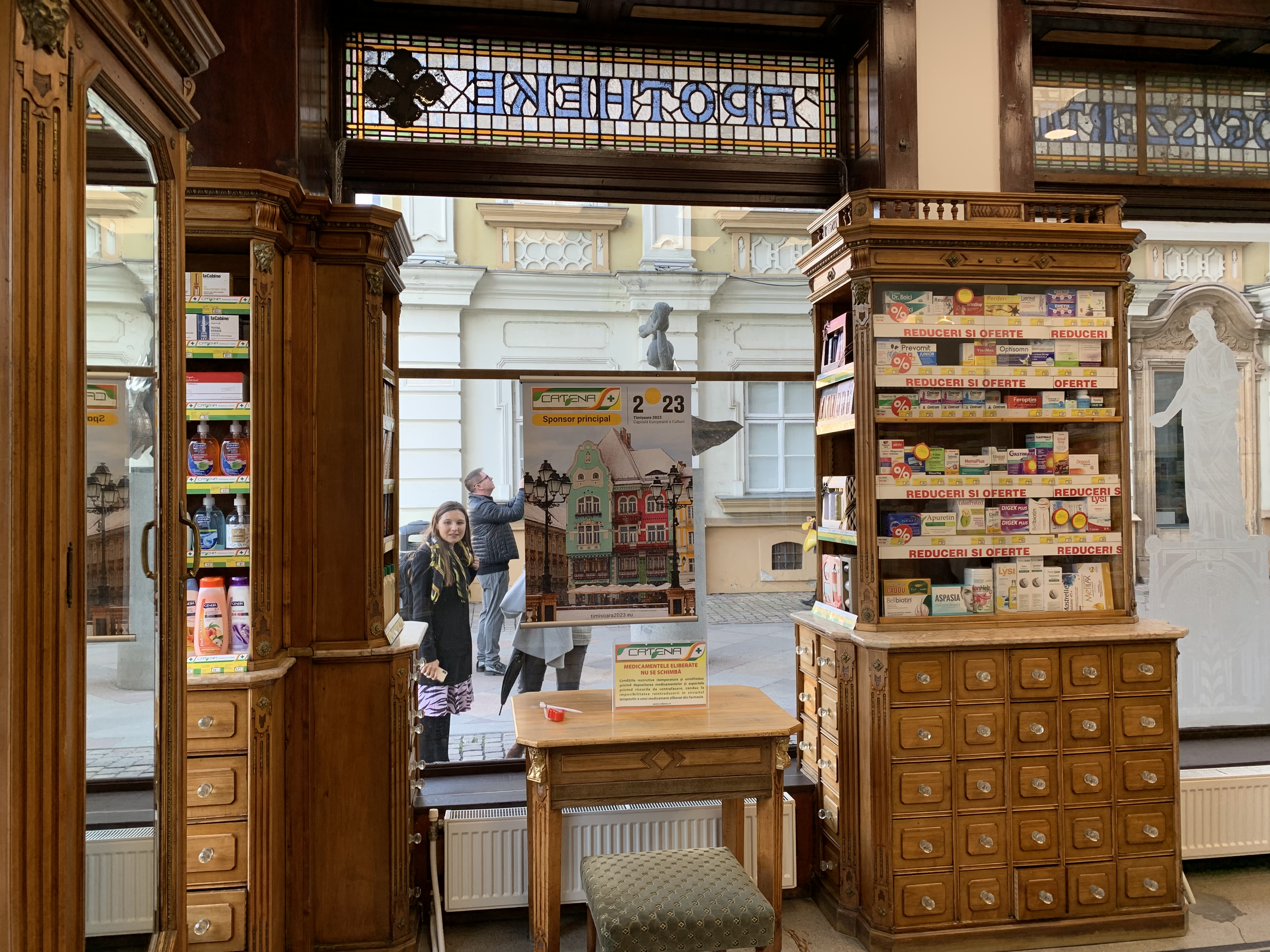
The interior of Brück House as of 2023, functioning as a pharmacy of Farmacia Catena

The building, consisting of a basement, ground floor and three floors, was built in the Art Nouveau and Secession styles and has Hungarian folklore motifs. Although the house was built in the Secession style, the corners of the building were not cut, this not being rounded, like all other monuments representative of this current. The height of the building symbolizes the separation from the Baroque style, which was quite expensive. For the facade, ceramic tiles with Hungarian folklore motifs, generalized to Secession architecture in Hungary, were used as an ornament, and on the pediment of the house, which reminds of constructions in Budapest, the letters "BS" are inscribed, representing the initials of the first owner, Salamon Brück. The foundation of the building is made of brick, as are the walls, which are 70 cm thick, while the ceiling is provided with vaults. The first floor is provided with closed balconies with glazed curtain walls, typical for the Art Nouveau current. The bow window on two levels and the delicate and structured forms of the roof characterize the szecesszió current.
