= Roman Catholic Diocese of Timișoara =

Roman Catholic diocese in Romania

Coordinates: 45.7582°N 21.2299°E

Diocese of Timișoara Dioecesis Timisoarensis Dieceza de Timișoara

Catholic
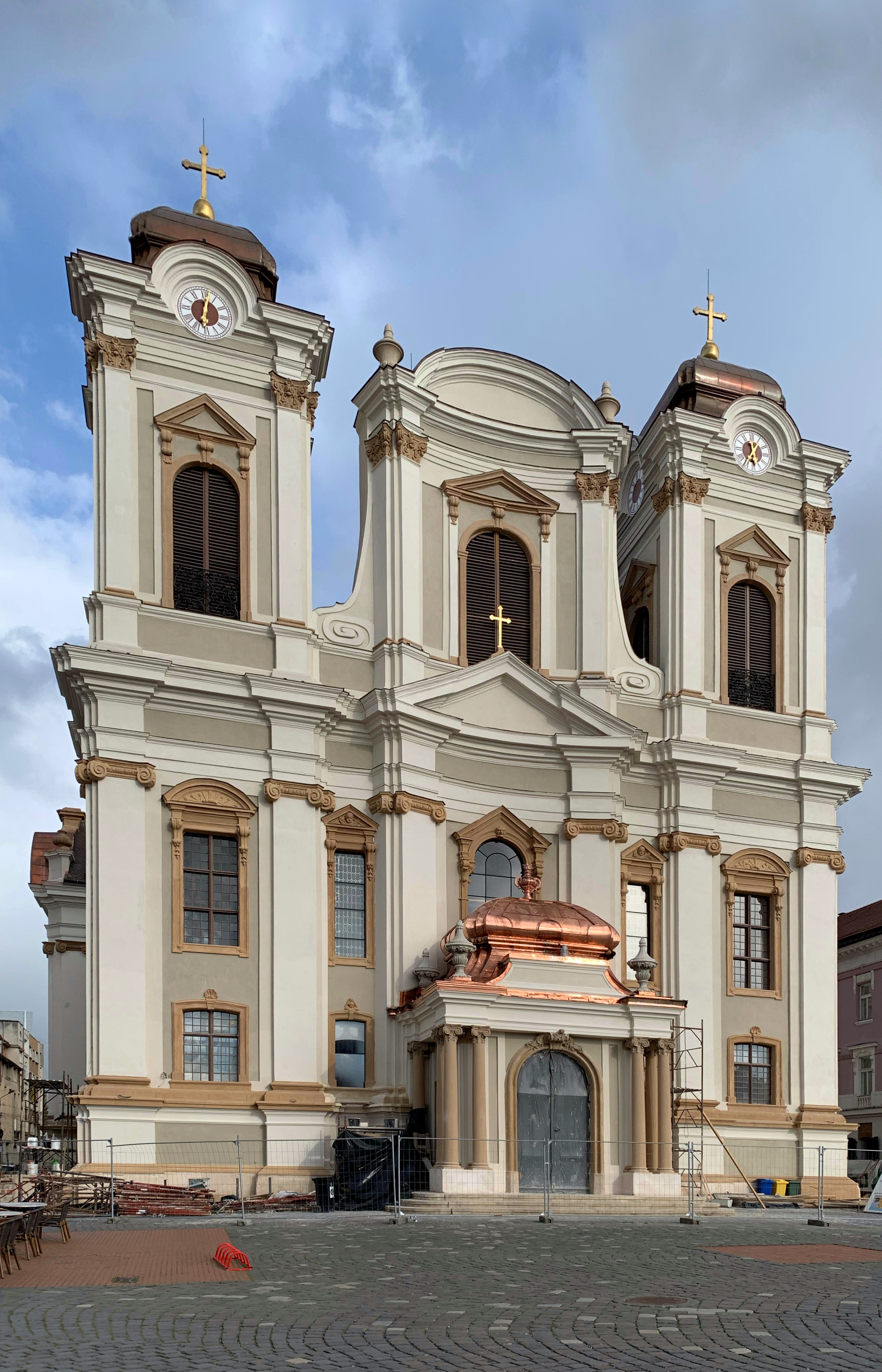
- The Cathedral of St George in Timișoara

Location
- Country: Romania
- Ecclesiastical province: Bucharest
- Metropolitan: Roman Catholic Archdiocese of Bucharest

Statistics
- Area: 24,755 km^{2} (9,558 sq mi)
- Population: Total; Catholics: (as of 2014); 1,345,576; 108,379 (8.1%)

Information
- Denomination: Roman Catholic
- Sui iuris church: Latin Church
- Rite: Roman Rite
- Established: 5 June 1930
- Cathedral: St. George's Cathedral, Timișoara
- Patron saint: Saint George

Current leadership
- Pope: Leo XIV
- Bishop: József-Csaba Pál
- Metropolitan Archbishop: Aurel Perca
- Bishops emeritus: Martin Roos

Map
- Administrative map of the Roman Catholic Church in Romania

The Diocese of Timișoara (Latin: Dioecesis Timisoarensis; Hungarian: Temesvári Római Katolikus Püspökség) is a Latin diocese of the Catholic Church in Romania established on 5 June 1930 by Pope Pius XI.

The Diocese of Cenad (Csanád), corresponding to approximately the same region, had been created in 1030 by Stephen I of Hungary but it was divided in 1930, the hungarian part (now Diocese of Szeged-Csanád) retained the old name even if Cenad is part of the Diocese of Timișoara. It is based in Timișoara (the city was, since 1730, the see of the Bishop of Csanád).

The diocese covers the Romanian Banat—the counties of Timiș, Caraș-Severin, Arad and part of Mehedinți, of which 11.1% are Roman Catholic, with compact concentrations in the Krashovani areas near Reșița and Sânnicolau Mare. A plurality of its adherents are Hungarian, followed by Banat Swabians, Romanians, Banat Bulgarians, Croats, Slovaks and Czechs. It is subordinate to the Bucharest Archdiocese. Since 2018, its bishop is József-Csaba Pál.

== List of bishops ==
- Augustin Pacha (1930-1954)
  - (sede vacante 1954-1990)
- Sebastian Kräuter (1990-1999)
- Martin Roos (1999-2018)
- József-Csaba Pál (since 2018)

== See also ==
- Roman Catholic Episcopal Palace of Timișoara
- Roman Catholic Diocese of Zrenjanin, in Serbian Banat
