= St. George Cathedral, Timișoara =

Church in Union Square, Timișoara, Romania

St. George Cathedral
- Catedrala Sf. Gheorghe
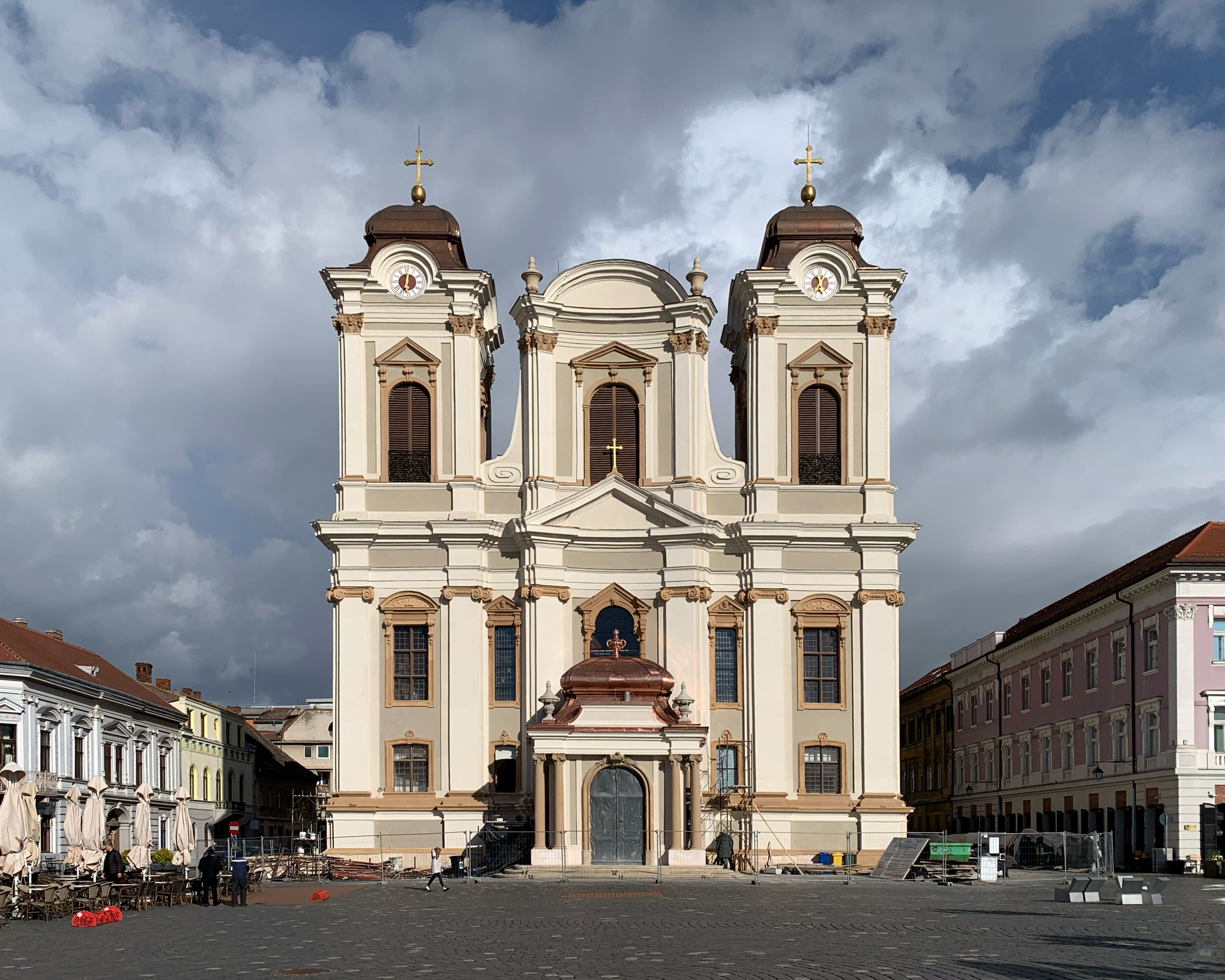

Religion
- Affiliation: Roman Catholic
- Ecclesiastical or organisational status: Roman Catholic Diocese of Timișoara
- Patron: St. George
- Year consecrated: 1803
- Status: Active

Location
- Location: Union Square, Timișoara
- Interactive map of St. George Cathedral
- Coordinates: 45°45′29″N 21°13′49″E

Architecture
- Architect: Joseph Emanuel Fischer von Erlach
- Style: Baroque
- Groundbreaking: 1736
- Completed: 1774

Specifications
- Length: 55 m
- Width: 22 m
- Height (max): 35.5 m
- Dome: 2
- Materials: Brick

The St. George Cathedral (Romanian: Catedrala Sf. Gheorghe), colloquially known as the Roman Catholic Dome (Romanian: Domul Romano-Catolic), is the cathedral of the Roman Catholic Diocese of Timișoara and one of the city's landmarks. The cathedral is dedicated to St. George and was built between 1736 and 1774. After the Cathedral Basilica of Oradea, it is the second largest Baroque religious building in Southeastern Europe. It was built as Cathedral of the Diocese of Csanád, but in 1930 became the seat of the new Diocese of Timișoara. Liturgies in Hungarian, German and Romanian are currently held regularly in the cathedral. Due to the remarkable acoustics, organ concerts are also held here.

== History ==
The construction of the cathedral was carried out during two decades, in two stages: 1736–1751 and 1755–1774, respectively. Although there is no evidence of this, it seems that the one who drew up the plan of the cathedral was Joseph Emanuel Fischer von Erlach, the then director of the Imperial Construction Office in Vienna and a very good connoisseur of the Baroque style. An 18th-century document, the Wienerische Diarium, mentions the laying of the foundation stone and also mentions that the architectural and construction plan was drawn up by Johann Jakob Schellbauer, councilor of the city of Vienna, and that it was approved by his superiors, who had this competence. The seat of the Roman Catholic diocesan bishop was originally in Cenad, which was devastated by the Turks, and moved to Szeged. In 1733, Emperor Charles VI moved his seat to Timișoara, at which time Adalbert von Falkenstein was bishop. Due to this, it was decided to build a cathedral, an episcopal palace and houses for the canons, which led to the laying of the foundation stone of the cathedral on 6 August 1736. After just one year, construction work had to be stopped due to the Austro-Turkish War. After the death of Adalbert von Falkenstein in 1739, Nikolaus Stanislavich, who had fled Craiova from the Ottomans, took over as his successor and restarted the construction work, which only reached its peak in the years 1746–1747. Bishop Franz Anton Engl von Wagrain, Stanislavich's successor, vigorously pushed ahead with the construction work on the cathedral in 1751–1752. On 8 September 1754 (Nativity of Mary) he celebrated the first Holy Mass, even though the completed half of the cathedral was separated from the construction site with a wooden shed. The High Mass began with the premiere of the Missa in honorem Sanctissimae Trinitatis composed by Michael Haydn for this occasion.

The second construction phase lasted from 1755 to 1774. The construction management was taken over by the engineers Carl Alexander Steinlein and Johann Theodor Kostka Edler. They added the missing parts of the cathedral, completed the masonry of the nave and built the two towers. They paid special attention to the tower facade and the entrance hall, which are characteristic of the cathedral. In 1761 the towers were completed and covered with clapboards, since the cost of copper domes was too high for the Viennese court. Carl Joseph Römmer proposed some modifications to the cathedral as early as the 18th century, of which only the entrance portico was executed. The solemn consecration of the cathedral took place only in 1803, on April 24, one day after the feast of St. George, the spiritual patron of the cathedral. The consecrator was Bishop Ladislaus Kőszeghy von Remete, a former Jesuit, who will open in 1804 the first Roman Catholic theological seminary in Timișoara.

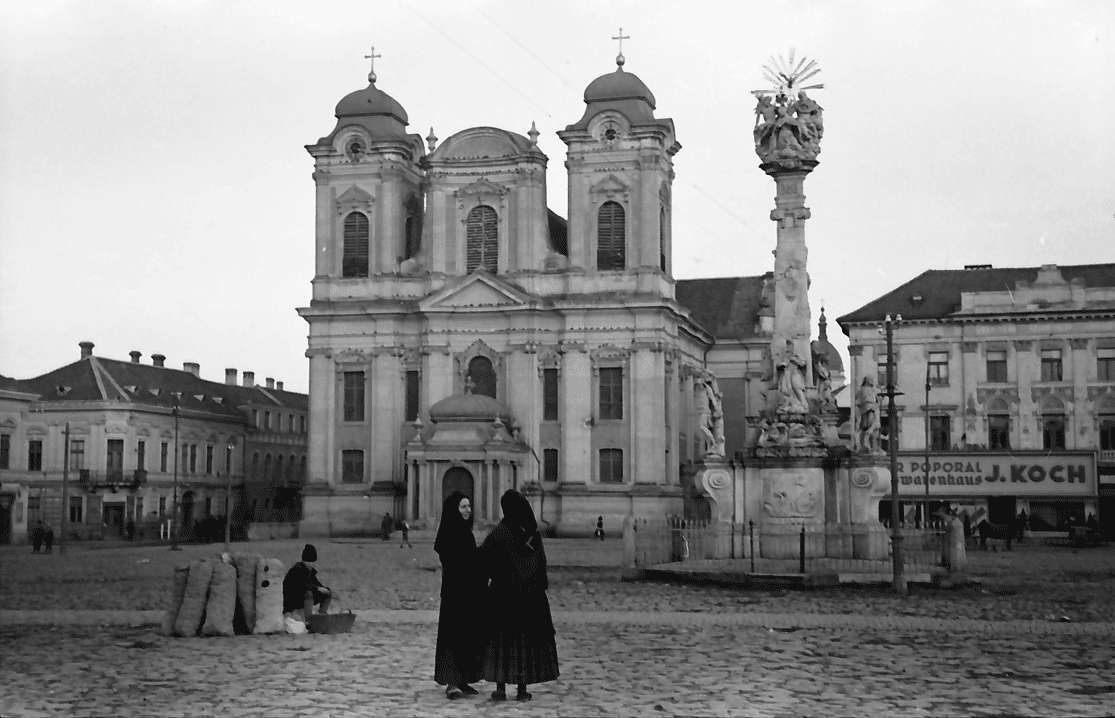
St. George Cathedral and the Union Square in 1937

In 1756, the cathedral was raised to the rank of first church of Timișoara, by a decree of Empress Maria Theresa. Between 1788 and 1790, during the fighting between the Turks and the Austrians, the cathedral served as a salt depot and proviant for the army. Also during the siege of Timișoara in 1849, the cathedral, where the city's citizens sought shelter, was badly damaged. When a bomb tore down the roof, the citizens fled into the crypt of the cathedral. In this crypt, several bishops and canons of Cenad, as well as military nobles, were buried.

== Architecture ==
The interior of the cathedral

The St. George Cathedral is considered to be the most unitary and representative Baroque construction of Timișoara. Due to the marshy terrain, the cathedral was built on wooden pillars. Its dimensions are impressive: it is 55 meters long, 22 meters wide, the height of the nave is 16.9 meters, and of the towers 35.5 meters. The shape of the cathedral is a cross, the building being made of brick, with exterior ornaments made of stucco and stone. The front doors are made of solid oak, ornamentally covered with nickel grilles.

The cathedral has nine altars, belonging to the Rococo and Baroque style, which were sculpted by Johannes Müller. The altars are decorated with icons, and the main altar is flanked by two statues of St. Teresa of Ávila and St. Charles Borromeo, both of which are sculpted by Johann Josef Rößler. The main altar was painted by Michelangelo Unterberger, then director of the Vienna Academy of Fine Arts, and its central part is dominated by statues of two cherubs. The painting above the main altar, made in 1754, also belongs to Unterberger. This depicts St. George in armor on horseback fighting a dragon. The structure of the side altars was made by Timișoara craftsmen Georg Wittmann and Franz Wagner, the necessary materials (marble and wood) being brought from Vienna. They were painted by Johann Nepomuk Schöpf in Prague in 1772. The interior of the cathedral is also notable for its valuable liturgical objects: the silver chandelier from the main altar (the so-called "Eternal Light"), made by the Viennese jeweler Josef Moser, the large, gilded monstrance, a few chalices and the silver ceremonial cross of the cathedral.

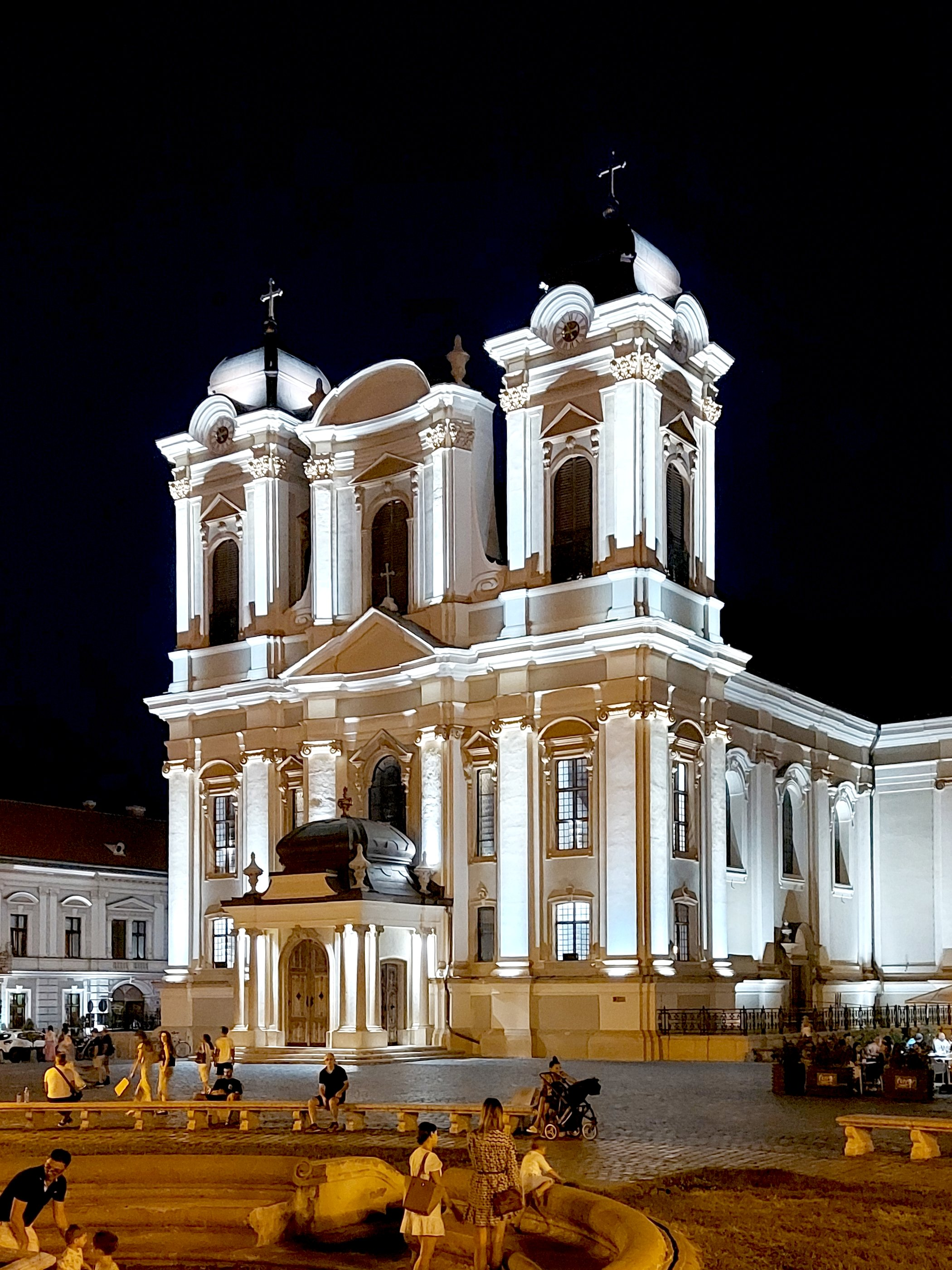
Cathedral at night

Of the four bells of the cathedral, only the large, episcopal one is found, which was cast in 1763 by Joseph Steinstock in Buda, Hungary. The first clock in the tower was made by the Timișoara watchmaker Joseph Martin Kidl in 1764 and was later replaced by Viennese and Timișoara craftsmen. The first Baroque-style organ, beautifully decorated, was built by the Viennese master Paul Hanke in 1757 and was replaced in 1907 by the current organ of the Timișoara builder Carl Leopold Wegenstein, considered a replica of that in Saint-Sulpice, Paris.

The basement of the cathedral is used as a crypt. Over the centuries, bishops, canons and a number of high-ranking soldiers and commanders of the Timișoara Fortress have been buried here. Among the bishops buried here are Nikolaus Stanislavich, Franz Anton Engl von Wagrain, Emmerich Christovich, Sándor Csajághy, Sándor Bonnaz, Sándor Dessewffy, Augustin Pacha, Adalbert Boros and Sebastian Kräuter. The first burial took place here in 1740, before the completion of the cathedral. Carlo Tazzoli, an Italian canon who came to Banat in the first half of the 18th century, together with the Italian settlers from Carani, was buried in the floor of the crypt. The most recent burial site is that of Bishop Sebastian Kräuter (2008).
