= Plague Column, Timișoara =

Monument in Romania

Plague Column
- Coloana Ciumei
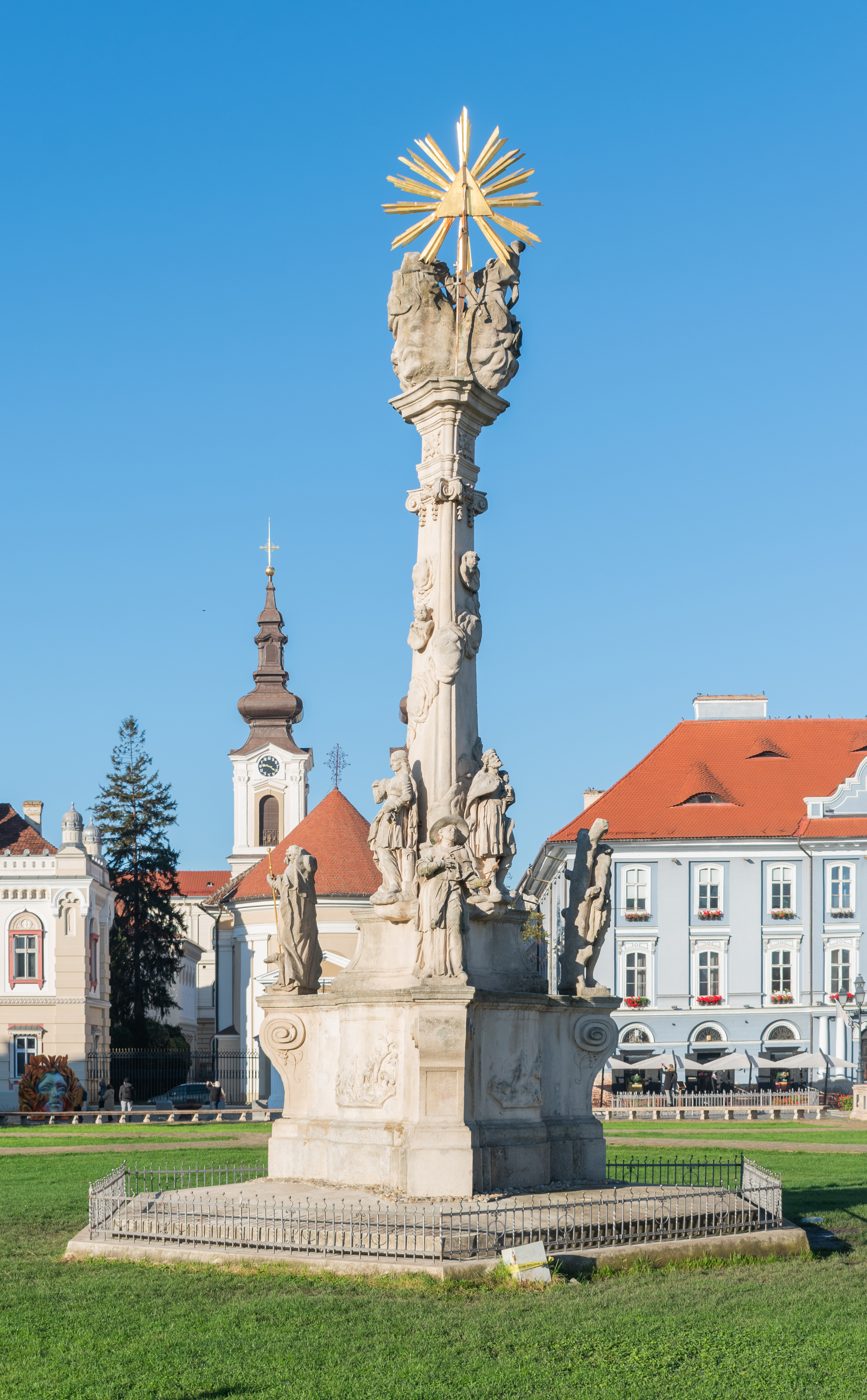
- Interactive map of Plague Column
- Location: Union Square, Timișoara
- Coordinates: 45°45′28″N 21°13′44″E
- Designer: Georg Raphael Donner
- Material: Sandstone
- Beginning date: 1739
- Completion date: 1740
- Dedicated to: Great Plague of 1738
- LMI code: TM-III-m-A-06313

Plague Column (Romanian: Coloana Ciumei; German: Pestsäule), also known as Holy Trinity Monument, is a Baroque monument in Timișoara's Union Square. It was placed in the central square of the city, then known as Domplatz, in 1740 as an ex voto of chamber councilor Johann Anton Deschan von Hansen. The monument belongs to the typology of plague columns, widespread in the Baroque era throughout the South German, Bohemian and Hungarian space.

== History ==
The statue commemorates the end of the plague epidemic that devastated the entire Banat between 1731 and 1738. During the epidemic, in Timișoara alone, more than 1,300 people lost their lives (one-sixth of the city's population). The epidemic was brought to Banat by Austrian imperial troops, and among the dead in Timișoara were six mayors.

The monument was created between 1739 and 1740 by sculptor Georg Raphael Donner in Vienna and transported via Danube–Tisza–Bega Canal to Timișoara. The entire project was overseen and funded by chamber councilor Johann Anton Deschan von Hansen, whose wife died during the epidemic. The statue was on display for 12 years in front of Deschan Palace, on the site of the current Bega Shopping Center. In 1755, at the insistence of Empress Maria Theresa, the statue, dismantled into pieces, was placed in its current location.

== Description ==
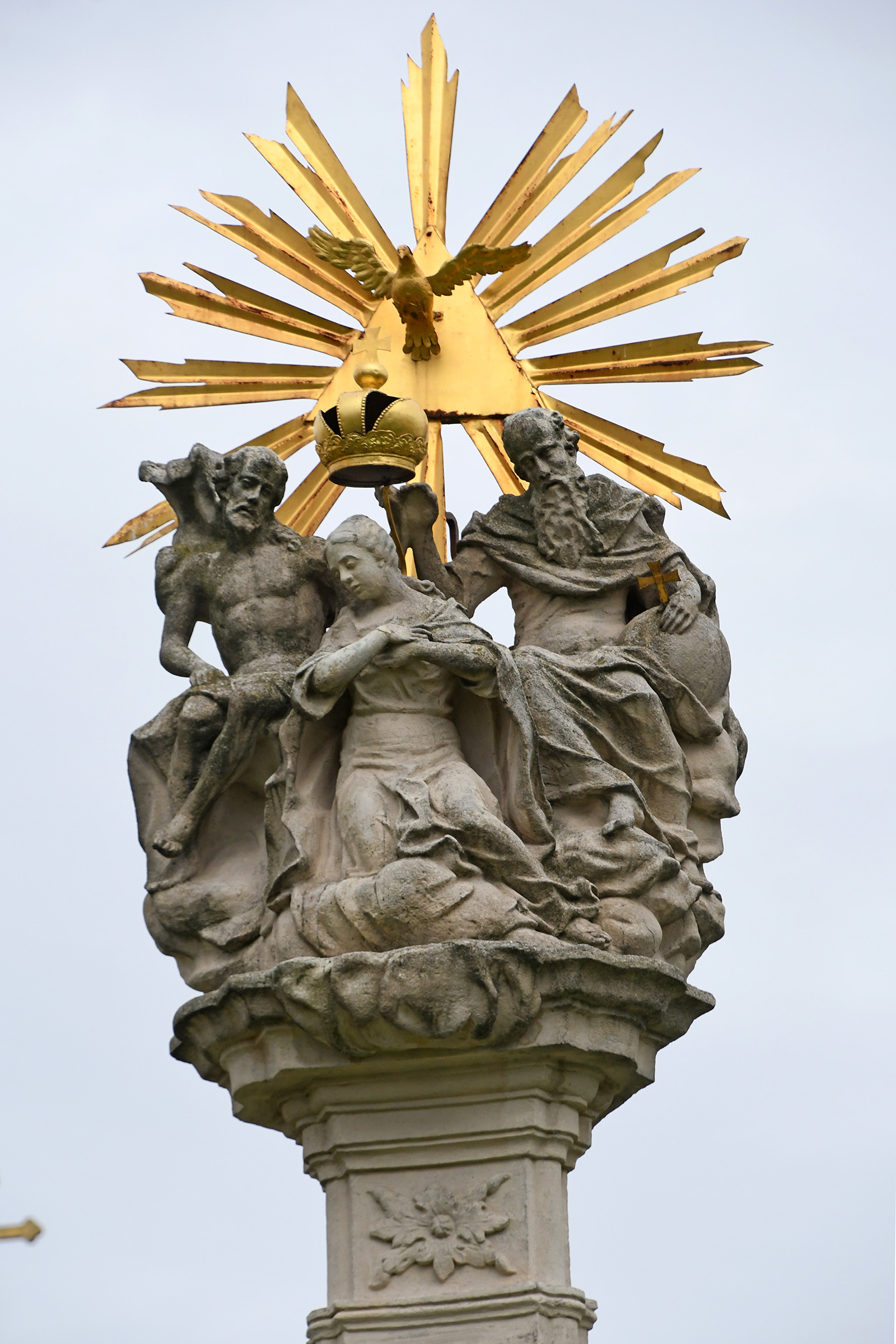
Details on the Plague Column

The corners of the base of the column are decorated with volutes, and on its sides there are three bas-reliefs, identified by Samu Borovszky as allegorical reliefs of Plague, War or Despair, but according to other opinions, they are scenes from the plague epidemic in Timișoara. Above the volutes are the statues of Saints Sebastian, Roch and Charles Borromeo. In the upper register, there are three more statues of antipestilential saints: John of Nepomuk, Barbara and Francis Xavier (presumably). The surfaces of the column itself are covered with clouds, and on the central part of the main side of the column appears an empty baroque shield, provided on its upper part with a crown. The Ionic capital of the column is also decorated with festoons, and above it lies a complex cornice, on the central part of which was carved a simple floral decoration.

The central representation of the column is the group of stone carved statues of the Holy Trinity, one of the most widespread variants of the plague columns. Between God the Father and Jesus seated on a throne, the Mother of God kneels with her hands clasped in prayer. The Father and the Son are just getting ready to place the crown on Mary's head. Above the three characters also appears the wrought iron figure of the dove of the Holy Spirit.
