= Count Mercy House =

- Casa Contelui de Mercy
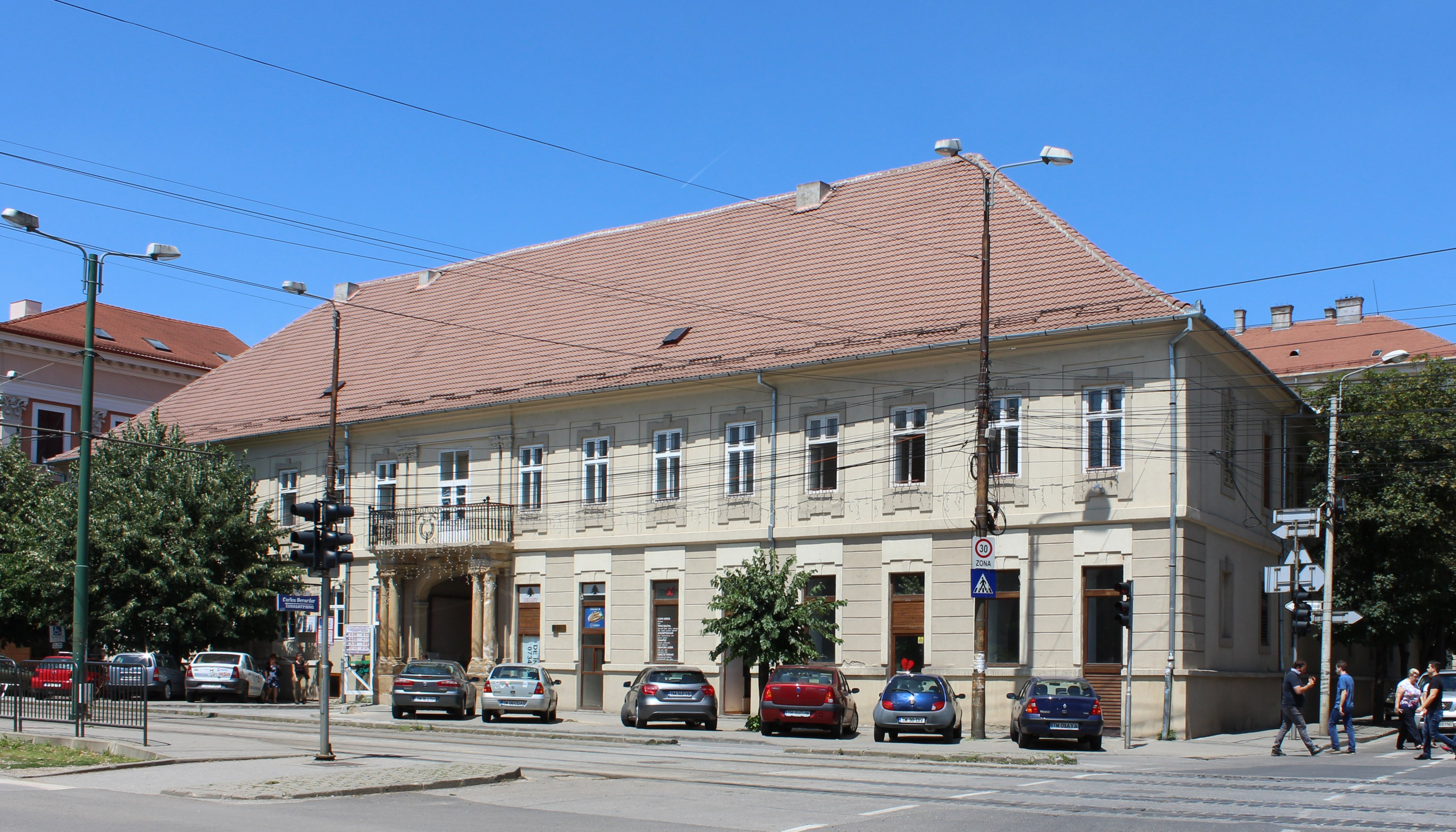
- Interactive map of the Count Mercy House area
- Alternative names: Mercy Palace

General information
- Architectural style: Classicist, baroque
- Location: Timișoara, Romania
- Coordinates: 45°45′22″N 21°13′54″E
- Completed: 1812

The Count Mercy House (Romanian: Casa Contelui de Mercy) is a historical monument in Timișoara, Romania. Also known as Mercy Palace, it was the residence of Florimond de Mercy d'Argenteau, former governor of Banat. Over time, the building was also the residence of the Roman Catholic bishop and a prison, and nowadays it houses offices and commercial spaces.

== History ==
On the site of the house, in the 1720s, the House of the Generalate ("Old Generalate") was built, in which was the residence of Count Claude Florimond de Mercy, former governor of Banat for 11 years after the conquest of Timișoara Fortress by the Habsburgs. As the new street network of Timișoara, which still exists today, had not yet been designed or laid out, that building was oriented obliquely and was much smaller than the current one. In 1734, the old building was called the "Interim Generalate", and in 1752 – the "Old House of the Generalate", made of bricks bound with clay. In 1754, the Provincial Court (Landgerichtshaus) functioned here. For a short period of time, the Roman Catholic bishop also lived here.

After 1768, the building was left to deteriorate, most of it being demolished in 1779, except for the eastern corner, which was demolished after 1788. The land in question remained vacant for a long time, only in 1812 being mentioned on the city plans the current building, the "New County House" (New Provincial Court). Until the establishment of the communist regime, it functioned both as a court and a prison. During communism, it was the headquarters of the Regional Directorate of Public Food.

== Architecture ==
The new building is made in classicist style with baroque reminiscences: the double Ionic columns that mark the entrance on the ground floor and the doubling of the pilasters above, on the first floor, correspond to the plastic procedures of baroque architecture. Neither the balcony nor the columns appear on the building project from 1804, nor on the images representing the building in the first half of the 19th century.
