= Augustin Pacha =

Romanian prelate

- Bishop of Timişoara
- Church: Catholic Church
- Diocese: Diocese of Timişoara
- In office: 12 March 1923 – 4 November 1954
- Predecessor: Apostolic Administration began
- Successor: Sebastian Kräuter
- Previous post: Titular Bishop of Lebedus (1927-1930)

Orders
- Ordination: 12 August 1893 by Alexander III. Dessewffy
- Consecration: 15 May 1927 by Angelo Dolci

Personal details
- Born: 26 November 1870 Moritzfeld, Temes County, Transleithania, Austria-Hungary
- Died: 4 November 1954 (aged 83) Timișoara, Timișoara Region, Romanian People's Republic

Augustin Pacha (26 November 1870 – 4 November 1954) was a Romanian prelate, the first bishop of the Roman Catholic Diocese of Timișoara. Born into a Banat Swabian family in Măureni (Moritzfeld), Caraș-Severin County, he was the twelfth of thirteen children and his father was a shoemaker. Following theological studies at the diocesan seminary in Timișoara (then Timișoara was the see of the Diocese of Csanád), he was ordained a priest in 1893 in the city's Roman Catholic cathedral. In 1927 he was consecrated bishop at the Timișoara cathedral, becoming titular bishop of Lebedus. Three years later, he became the first Bishop of Timișoara, a diocese succeeding the former one at Cenad, the last bishop having departed Romania in 1923, leaving Pacha as Apostolic Administrator. In February 1934, alarmed by rising Nazi sentiment among the Swabians of his diocese, he visited Adolf Hitler, receiving a polite reply to his complaints but no concrete action.

Beginning in 1948, the authorities of the new communist regime took a series of repressive measures: abrogating the concordat; abolishing Pacha's diocese and forcing him to retire; shutting down monasteries and religious schools; seizing the seminary and its assets, as well as the bishop's palace; arresting and torturing numerous priests. Pacha made public a letter written by the Pope that denounced communism, and also rejected the regime's attempt to fashion a compliant Catholic Church, making him the subject of close supervision by the Securitate secret police. Arrested in June 1950 in Carașova, where he planned to take a vacation, he was briefly interrogated at Reșița before being incarcerated in Bucharest and at Sighet prison. At a show trial involving other clergymen in Bucharest in September 1950, he was accused of being an American and Vatican spy and of Nazi sympathies, his visit to Hitler being brought up. He was sentenced to eighteen years' imprisonment and ten years' deprivation of civic rights, and was fined 880,000 lei and charged 306,000 lei damages against the state. Hoping to avoid the creation of a martyr and to draw public sympathy, the authorities released him in June 1954. Pacha, seriously ill with cancer, returned to Timișoara the following month and was placed under house arrest in a parish house. He died several months later and was buried in the crypt of the cathedral.

He was a life member of the Romanian Senate between 1939 and 1944.
