= Romania–Serbia relations =

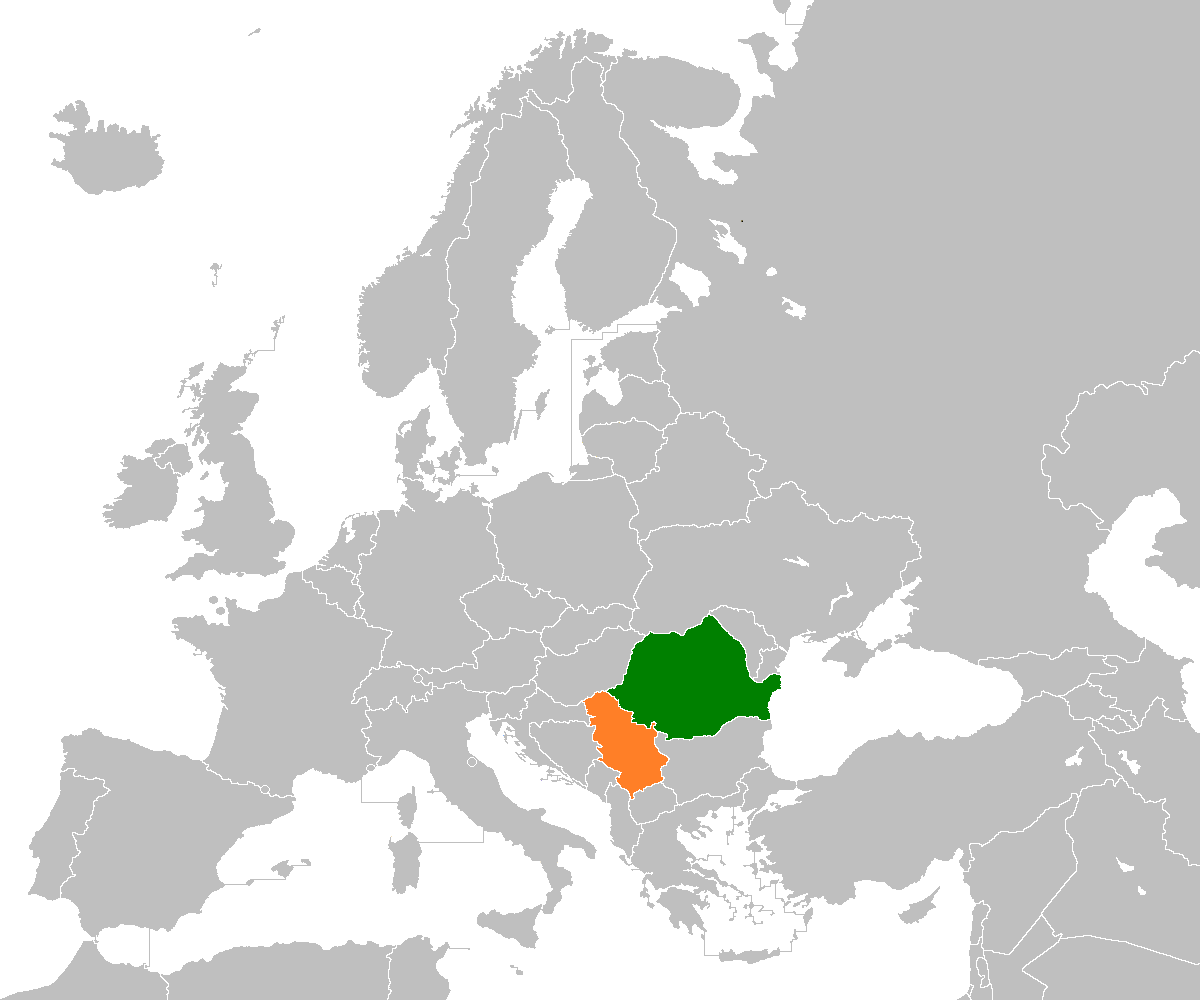
- Romania: Serbia

Romania and Serbia maintain diplomatic relations established in 1879. From 1918 to 2006, Romania maintained relations with the Kingdom of Yugoslavia, the Socialist Federal Republic of Yugoslavia (SFRY), and the Federal Republic of Yugoslavia (FRY) (later Serbia and Montenegro), of which Serbia is considered shared (SFRY) and sole (FRY) legal successor, respectively. The two countries have traditionally enjoyed good neighborly relations, as exemplified by the Romanian adage, "Romania has only two friends—Serbia and the Black Sea".

== History ==
The Principality of Serbia opened its first diplomatic mission in Wallachia in 1836, when it opened the Princely-Serbian Diplomatic Agency in Bucharest. In 1863, the first official diplomatic agencies were opened in Bucharest and Belgrade: Kosta Magazinović as the first diplomatic agent of Serbia in Romania, and Teodor Calimachi as the first diplomatic agent of Romania in Serbia.

At the time, both Romania and Serbia were under Ottoman suzerainty, and were fighting for their independence. As the Great Eastern Crisis was reopened when the Russian Empire and the Ottoman Empire went to war in 1877, a coalition supporting the Russians was formed by Bulgaria, Montenegro, Romania and Serbia. The latter three countries were granted independence following the Treaty of Berlin in 1878.

In 1879, the diplomatic agencies in Belgrade and Bucharest became legations, and the diplomatic agents became resident ministers. Lascăr Catargiu became the first resident minister of Romania in Serbia, and Milan Petronijević became the first resident minister of Serbia in Romania. Both Romania and Serbia became kingdoms, in 1881 and 1882, respectively, and their diplomatic representatives became "extraordinary envoy and plenipotentiary ministers". Officially, the legations from Belgrade and Bucharest became embassies in 1939.

The Kingdom of Romania and the Kingdom of Serbia fought together in the Second Balkan War of 1913, against the Kingdom of Bulgaria. One year later, the World War I began when Austro-Hungary invaded Serbia due to the assassination of Franz Ferdinand in Sarajevo by Gavrilo Princip, an ethnic Serb. Despite Romania technically being part of the Central Powers, it refused to take part in the war, and, in 1916, joined the Entente, the same alliance Serbia was a part of. After the Entente won the war, both Romania and Serbia, alongside the newly formed Czechoslovakia, went to war with Hungary, and, at the end, as the victorious powers, annexed parts of it. Because of this, the First Czechoslovak Republic, the Kingdom of Romania and the Kingdom of Serbs, Croats and Slovenes formed the Little Entente in 1921. Moreover, in 1934, the Kingdom of Romania and the Kingdom of Yugoslavia, alongside the Second Hellenic Republic and the Republic of Turkey formed the Balkan Pact to avoid the revisionist politics of Bulgaria.

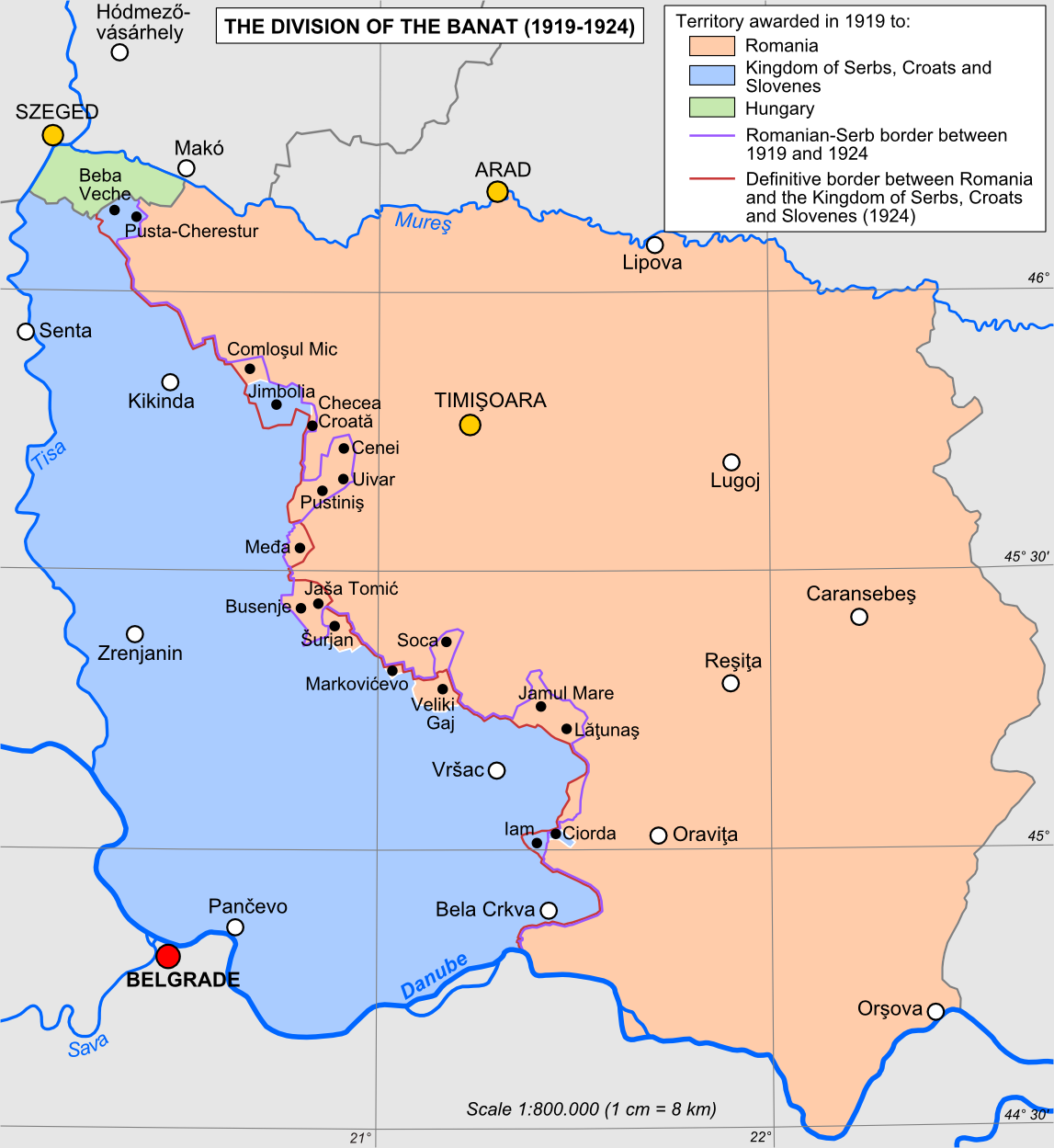
Division of Banat in 1919, establishing present-day Romania–Serbia border

During the World War II, Romania was led to become an Axis member, which made the country recognize the Independent State of Croatia after Yugoslavia's dismantle by Nazi Germany, Fascist Italy, Hungary and Bulgaria. This led to a diplomatic breakup of relations. Moreover, calls for Romania to annex parts of Yugoslavia, namely the ethnic Romanian villages in Morava and Danube banovinas, were made. Romania refused to annex any parts of Yugoslavia and relations were eventually reestablished after the proclamation of Socialist Federal Republic of Yugoslavia after the war ended.

The Soviet Army occupation of Romania at the end of the war led to the creation of People's Republic of Romania, a socialist satellite state of the Soviet Union. Understanding the nature of European geopolitics at the time, including the Tito-Stalin split, Romania and Yugoslavia had tense relations over the course of the first postwar years. After Romania broke up from the Soviet sphere of influence and became fully independent, relations were retaken and became really close, Romanian communist leader Nicolae Ceaușescu and Yugoslav leader Josif Broz Tito meeting more than twenty times until Tito's death in 1980. Tito-Ceaușescu cooperation led to the construction of the Iron Gate I and Iron Gate II hydroelectric power stations, the largest dams over the Danube and some of the largest in Europe.

Yugoslavia also became the biggest host of Romanian refugees during the last decade of communism in Romania, when it became unbearable due to Ceaușescu's ambitions and rules. As the communist regime prohibited citizens of leaving the country, tens of thousands, if not even hundreds of thousands, of Romanian citizens from all across the country tried to evade Romania by illegally swimming or rowing across the Danube river into Yugoslavia, where they would be granted asylum and freedom to leave towards Western Europe, North America or Australia. Dozens of people died during their attempt.

Modern relations between Romania and Serbia began right after the Romanian revolution and the beginning of the Yugoslav Wars. In the last decade of the 20th century, relations between the two countries were mostly affected after Romania decided to join the international community and enforced the embargo UN imposed over Yugoslavia during the Bosnian War, leading to a political rupture of the good historical relations between the two countries. This, inadvertently, led to one of the biggest illegal trafficking network in Europe at the time. As the embargo prevented Yugoslavia from purchasing fuel, Romanian citizens, impoverished by the internal crisis inadvertently caused by the fall of the communist regime, began illegally crossing the Danube to sell petrol, diesel and other forms of fuel to their Serbian neighbours. During a two years period, between 1993 and 1995, a lot of Romanians in the villages on the Danube shore got rich by illegal means, helping their Serbian counterparts. Any form of gas in Yugoslavia was around five times more expensive than in Romania. The network abruptly shut down in 1995, and it is believed that, despite their position, the Romanian government involved in it. Around ten to twenty people were killed during those years, either by the Romanian border guards or other smugglers.

Bilateral relations worsened during the late 1990s, when Romania, on its way of accession to NATO, allowed in 1999 NATO planes to use Romanian airspace to strike targets in Serbia. Supporting NATO during that bombing campaign got Romania's position as an official NATO member in 2004. However, a overwhelmingy majority of Romanians continued showing support to their historical ally Serbia and strongly opposed the NATO bombing campaign.

Romania and Serbia have historically had friendly relations, as exemplified by the Romanian adage, "Romania has only two friends—Serbia and the Black Sea". In the early 2000s, Romania supported Serbia's integration within the international community. In recent years, there has been some friction concerning the status of Romanians in Serbia's Timok Valley, where they are known in Serbian as "Vlachs" and claim a separate ethnic identity from Romanians.

== Political relations ==
Serbia officially applied for European Union membership in 2009 and has become an official candidate-country in 2012. Romania unsuccessfully tried to veto Serbia on receiving the candidate status, quoting the lack of minority rights for the ethnic Romanian minority in Serbia. However, ever since then, Romania intensively intervened in Serbia's accession by sending aid in forms of financial and technical means to their Serbian counterparts. In 2024, Romania voted in favor of United Nations resolution recognizing Srebrenica massacre as a genocide. In contrast, Hungary voted against the resolution, siding with Serbia. Romania's vote sparked some debates in Serbia regarding its otherwise close and historically friendly relations with Romania.

Both countries are members of Craiova Group, a cooperation project of Romania, Bulgaria, Greece, and Serbia for the purposes of furthering their economic, transport and energy cooperation. The Group originated in a summit meeting of the heads of governments of Bulgaria, Romania, and Serbia, held in 2015 in the Romanian city of Craiova.

=== Romania's stance on Kosovo ===
Romania is one of five member states of the European Union (other being Greece, Cyprus, Slovakia and Spain) that does not recognize unilateral declaration of independence of Kosovo and is actively opposing its membership in international organisations such as UNESCO, the Council of Europe, and the Interpol.

Kosovo's declaration of independence caused debates and outrage in Romania, as the country strongly opposes any kind of self-determination and refuses to acknowledge the sovereignty of Kosovo. On 18 February 2008, the very next day after Kosovo's secession from Serbia, a vote in the Parliament of Romania determined their position regarding Kosovo. The results were strongly against any recognition, with 357 "No" votes and only 27 "Yes" votes.

While Romania and Serbia do have a historically good relations, the main reasons of Romania's position is the Székely Land (region in Romania where the majority is composed of ethnic Hungarians and Székelys) as well as the problem of the unrecognized state of Transnistria in Moldova. Therefore, recognizing the independence of Kosovo may lead Székely Land to seek for autonomy or even independence, with nationalist figures such as Corneliu Vadim Tudor claiming their intention is to instantly be absorbed into neighbouring Hungary, country that used to rule the region for hundreds of years. During the 2008 parliamentary vote regarding Kosovo's independence, the only votes in favor of supporting Kosovo's declaration of independence came from the ethnic Hungarian party UDMR, which actively supports Székely Land's autonomy within Romania.

Recent examples of the relations between Romania and Kosovo were football matches of the national teams in 2023 and 2024. Their national teams were drawn into the same group for the qualifiers to the UEFA Euro 2024 tournament, and during the second-leg match between the teams in 2023 in Bucharest, an ultras group that was supporting the Romanian side displayed two banners quoting "Basarabia e România" ("Bessarabia is Romania" in Romanian) and "Kosovo je Srbija" ("Kosovo is Serbia" in Serbian) and began shouting pro-Serbia chants. The match was eventually interrupted for almost an hour, after a Romanian fan threw a torch on the pitch and the Kosovar side left the pitch in protest. Another match, this time in the UEFA Nations League, was abandoned in 2024, after Kosovo players walked off the pitch in the 93rd minute due to offensive chanting from Romanian fans, including pro-Serbian slogans.

== Economic relations ==
Trade between two countries amounted to $2.7 billion in 2023; Serbia's merchandise exports to Romania were about $1.5 billion; Romanian exports were standing at $1.1 billion.

== Romanians in Serbia ==
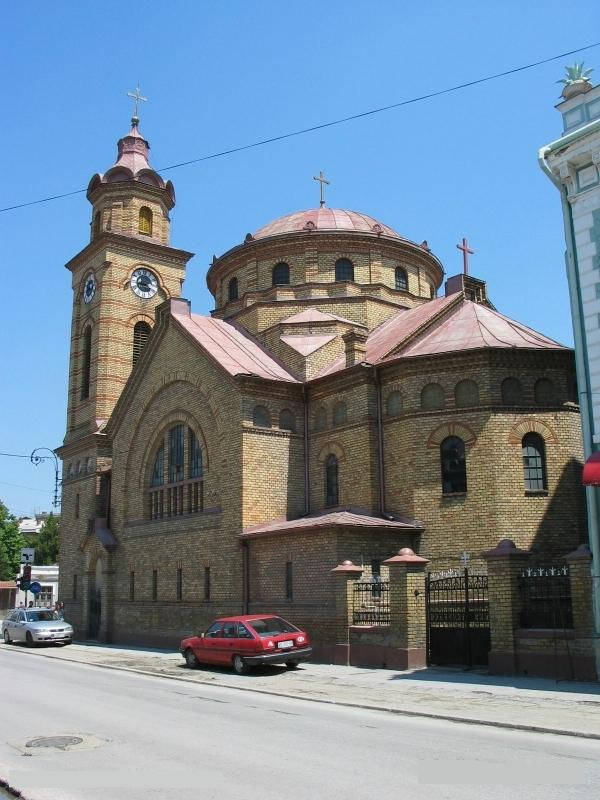
Romanian Orthodox Cathedral of the Ascension of the Lord in Vršac

Romanians in Serbia are a recognized ethnic minority group. The total number of self-declared Romanians according to the 2022 Census was 23,044, while 21,013 people declared themselves Vlachs; there are differing views among some of the Vlachs over whether they should be regarded as Romanians or as members of a distinctive nationality. Declared Romanians are mostly concentrated in southern Banat, in Vojvodina, while declared Vlachs are mostly concentrated in the Timok Valley, in eastern Serbia. Towns such as Bor, Vršac, or Zrenjanin, have significant concentration of Romanians/Vlachs.

As Daco-Romanian-speakers, the Vlachs have a connection to the Roman heritage in Serbia. Following Roman withdrawal from the province of Dacia at the end of the 3rd century, the name of the Roman region was changed to Dacia Aureliana, and (later Dacia Ripensis) spread over most of what is now called Serbia and Bulgaria. Strong Roman presence in the region persisted through the end of Justinian's reign in the 6th century. Starting in the early 18th century eastern Serbia was settled by Romanians (then known by their international exonym as Vlachs) from Banat, parts of Transylvania, and Oltenia. Today about three-quarters of the Vlach population in Serbia speak the Ungurean subdialect. In the 19th century other groups of Romanians, originating in Oltenia, also settled south of the Danube.

Romanian is one of the official languages of the provincial administration in Vojvodina.

== Serbs in Romania ==
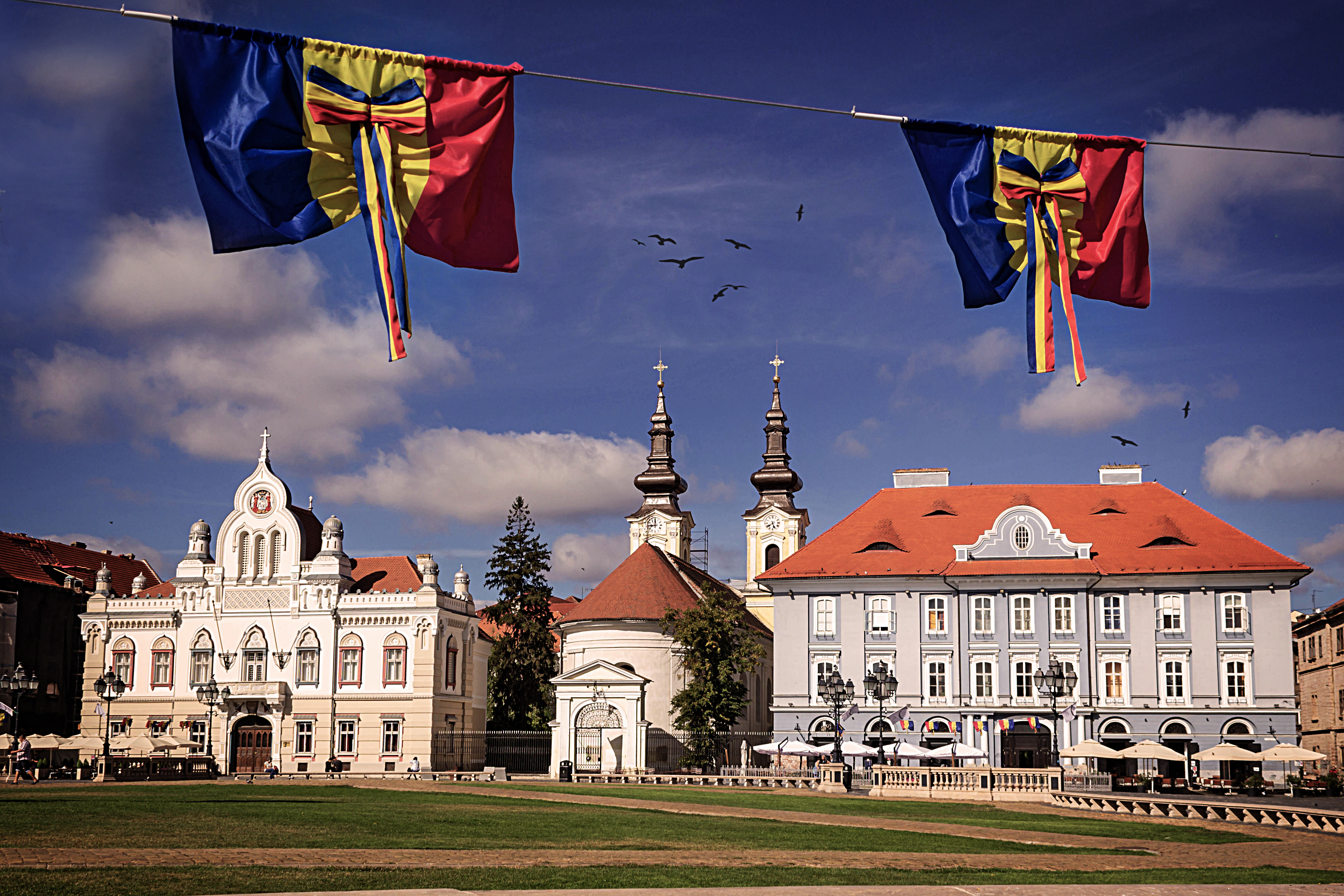
Serbian Orthodox Cathedral of the Ascension of the Lord (center) and Serbian Orthodox Bihsop's Palace (left) in Timișoara

Serbs in Romania are a recognized ethnic minority group. According to the 2021 Census they number 12,026 people and constitute 0.06% of total population of the country. Most of Serbs in Romania live in the counties of Arad, Caraș-Severin, Mehedinți, and Timiș, located along the Serbian border. Notable examples of settlements with Serb ethnic majority include Șvinița in Mehedinți county and Socol in Caraș-Severin county.

From the late 14th- to the beginning of the 16th century a large number of Serbs lived in Wallachia and Moldavia. Following Ottoman expansion in Balkans in the 15th century, Serb mass migrations ensued north into Pannonian Plain. Serbian Orthodox monasteries began to be built in the area from the 15th century, including Kusić and Senđurađ built by despot Jovan Branković, and in the 16th century including Bezdin and Hodoș-Bodrog Monastery where built by the Jakšić family. Serbs constituted a significant portion of the population in Banat during the Ottoman rule. After the crushing of the Uprising in Banat, many Serbs migrated to Transylvania under the leadership of Bishop Teodor; the territory towards Ineu and Teiuș was settled, where Serbs had lived since earlier – the Serbs had their eparchies, opened schools, founded churches and printing houses. The area along the Mureș river in southern Crișana was as well settled by many Serbs and was known as Pomorišje. The Great Migrations of the Serbs in 1690 and 1737–39 led to additional settlement of Serbs in today’s western Romania.

Serbs in Romania have the right to study up to high school and take the baccalaureate exam in their native language. One seat in the Chamber of Deputies is reserved for the ethnic Serb minority.

== Resident diplomatic missions ==
- Romania has an embassy in Belgrade and consulates general in Vršac and Zaječar.
- Serbia has an embassy in Bucharest and a consulate general in Timișoara.
Embassy of Serbia in Bucharest

== See also ==
- Foreign relations of Romania
- Foreign relations of Serbia
- Serbia–NATO relations
- Accession of Serbia to the EU
- Romania–Yugoslavia relations

== Sources ==
- Cerović, Ljubivoje (1997). "Srbi u Rumuniji od ranog srednjeg veka do današnjeg vremena". Projekat Rastko. Archived from the original on 2013-06-14.
- Ćirković, Sima (2004). The Serbs. Malden: Blackwell Publishing. ISBN 9781405142915.
- Gavrilović, Slavko (1993). "Serbs in Hungary, Slavonia and Croatia in struggles against the Turks (15th-18th centuries)". Serbs in European Civilization. Belgrade: Nova, Serbian Academy of Sciences and Arts, Institute for Balkan Studies. pp. 41–54. ISBN 9788675830153.
- Lemajić, Nenad (2015). "The Serbian Population of the Banat and the Western Mureş Basin in the 15th and 16th Centuries (and its Local and Military Leaders)". The Cultural and Historical Heritage of Vojvodina in the Context of Classical and Medieval Studies. Novi Sad: Faculty of Philosophy. pp. 205–222.
