= Bodrogu =

Bodrogu may refer to one of two villages in Arad County, Romania:

- Bodrogu Nou, a village in Zădăreni Commune
- Bodrogu Vechi, a village in Pecica town
