= Romania–Yugoslavia relations =

- Romania: Yugoslavia

Romania–Yugoslavia relations
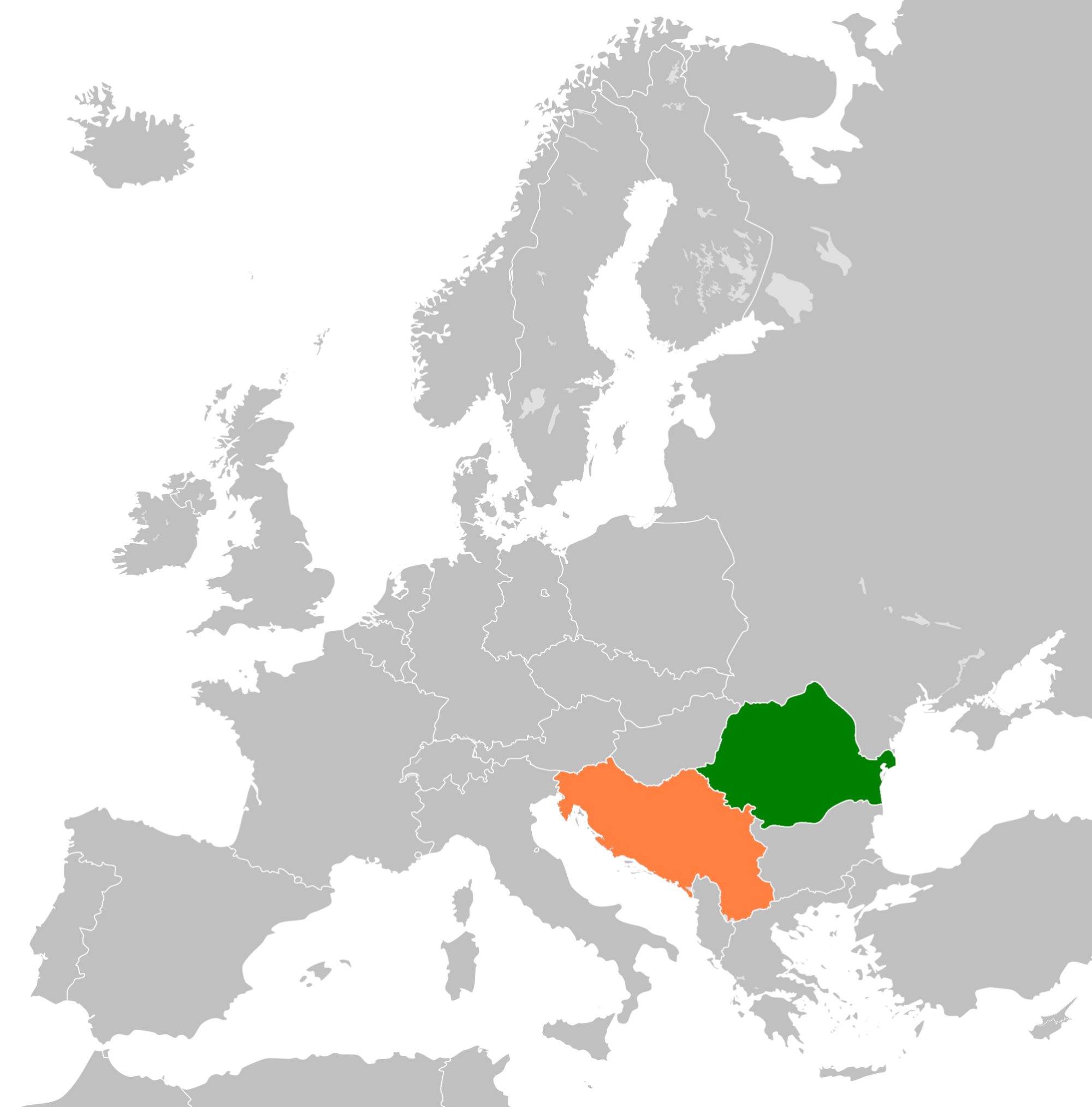

- Romania: Yugoslavia

Romania–Yugoslavia relations
- Romania: Yugoslavia

Romania–Yugoslavia relations were historical foreign relations between Romania (both Kingdom of Romania 1918-1947 and the People's or Socialist Republic of Romania 1947–1989) and now broken up Yugoslavia (Kingdom of Yugoslavia 1918-1941 and Socialist Federal Republic of Yugoslavia 1945–1992). Relations between Romania and independent South Slavic states (primarily Serbia) developed before creation of Yugoslavia and union of Transylvania with Romania and those relations played prominent role during the Second Balkan War.

== History ==
=== Interwar period ===
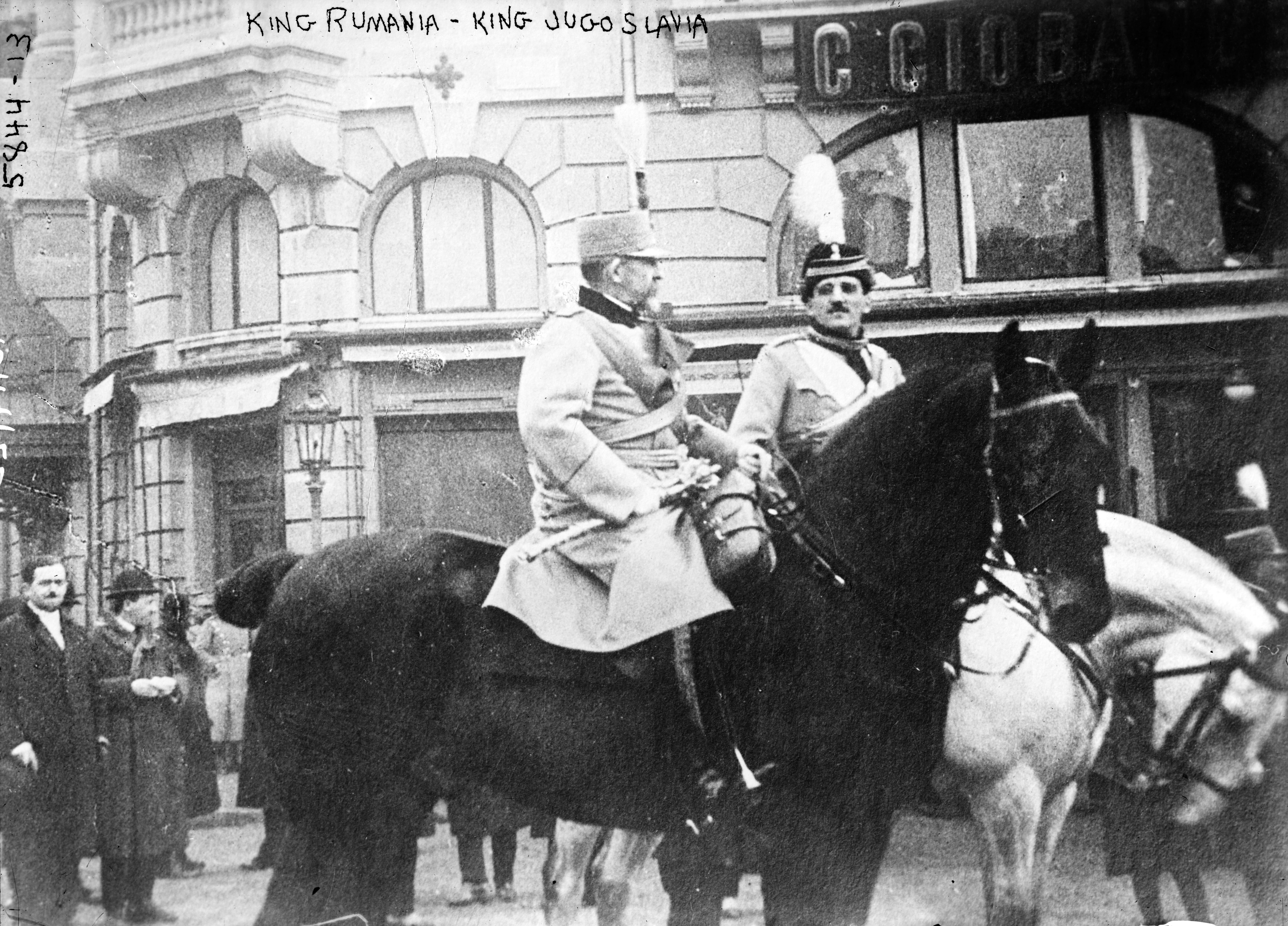
King of Romania and King of Yugoslavia

After the dissolution of Austria-Hungary both Romania and Yugoslavia established and cooperated in the framework of the Little Entente and the Balkan Pact.

=== World War II ===
During the World War II in Yugoslavia the country was divided in different directly occupied territories and puppet states. While most of the other Yugoslav Axis neighbors participated in division, Romania did not occupy any Yugoslav territory with some sources claiming Romanian reluctant refusal to do so despite German offers. Other sources claim that Nazi Germany was reluctant to transfer Banat to Romania for fear of armed conflict between Romania and Hungary therefore establishing its direct control in the region.

=== Cold War period ===
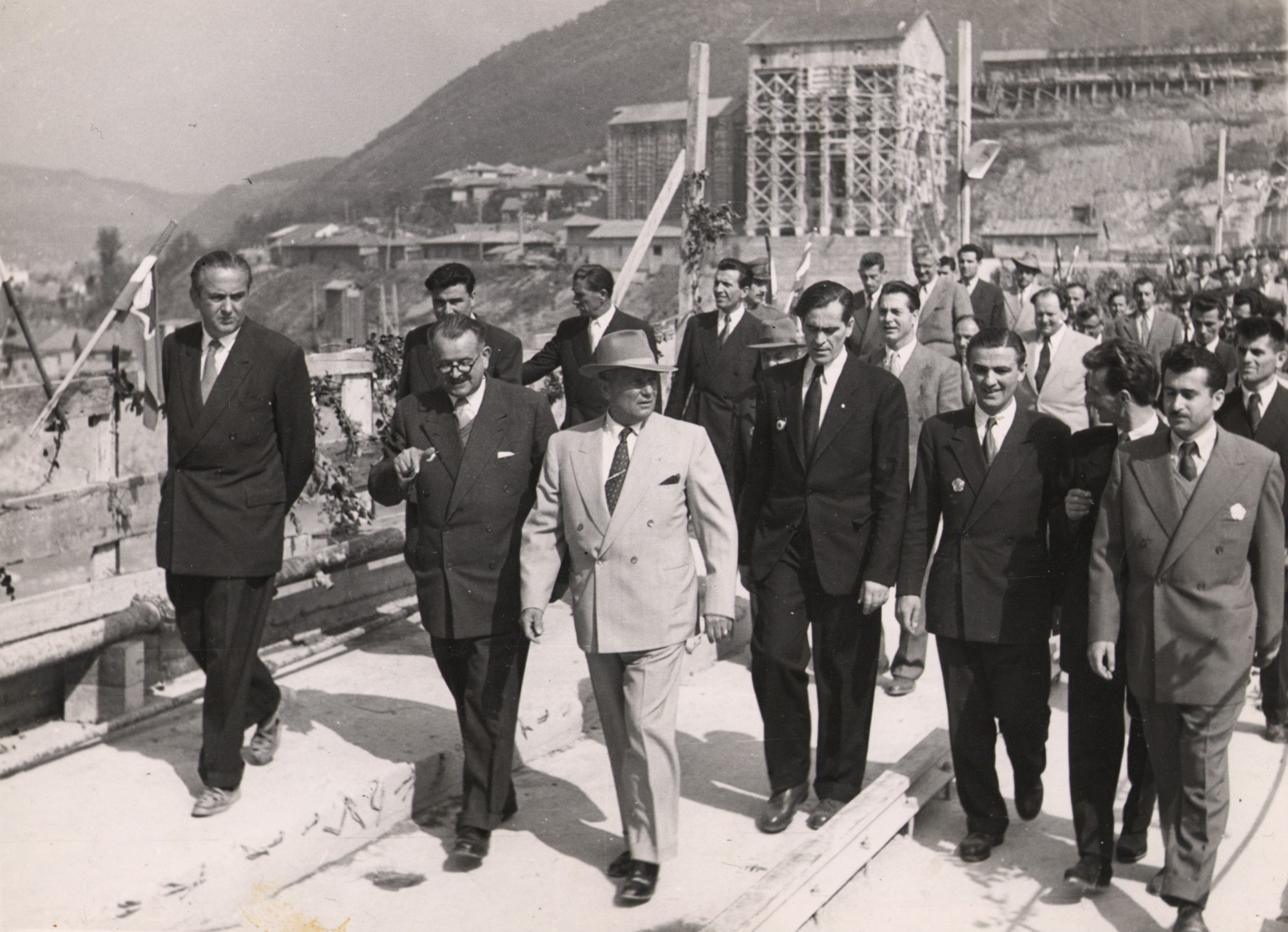
President Tito at the Iron Gate I Hydroelectric Power Station construction site.

Following the 1948 Tito–Stalin split close relations with all Eastern Bloc countries, including Romania, were either suspended or significantly strained. The relations between Romania and Yugoslavia were particularly tense over the issue of navigation on the Danube river where East Bloc its earlier favorable position.

Following the Warsaw Pact invasion of Czechoslovakia Romania developed closer relations with countries which were not part of the East Bloc. Ceaușescu regime promoted friendly relations both with China and Yugoslavia and openly opposed the Brezhnev Doctrine. Between 1964 and President Tito's death in 1980 Ceaușescu and Tito met more than 20 times.

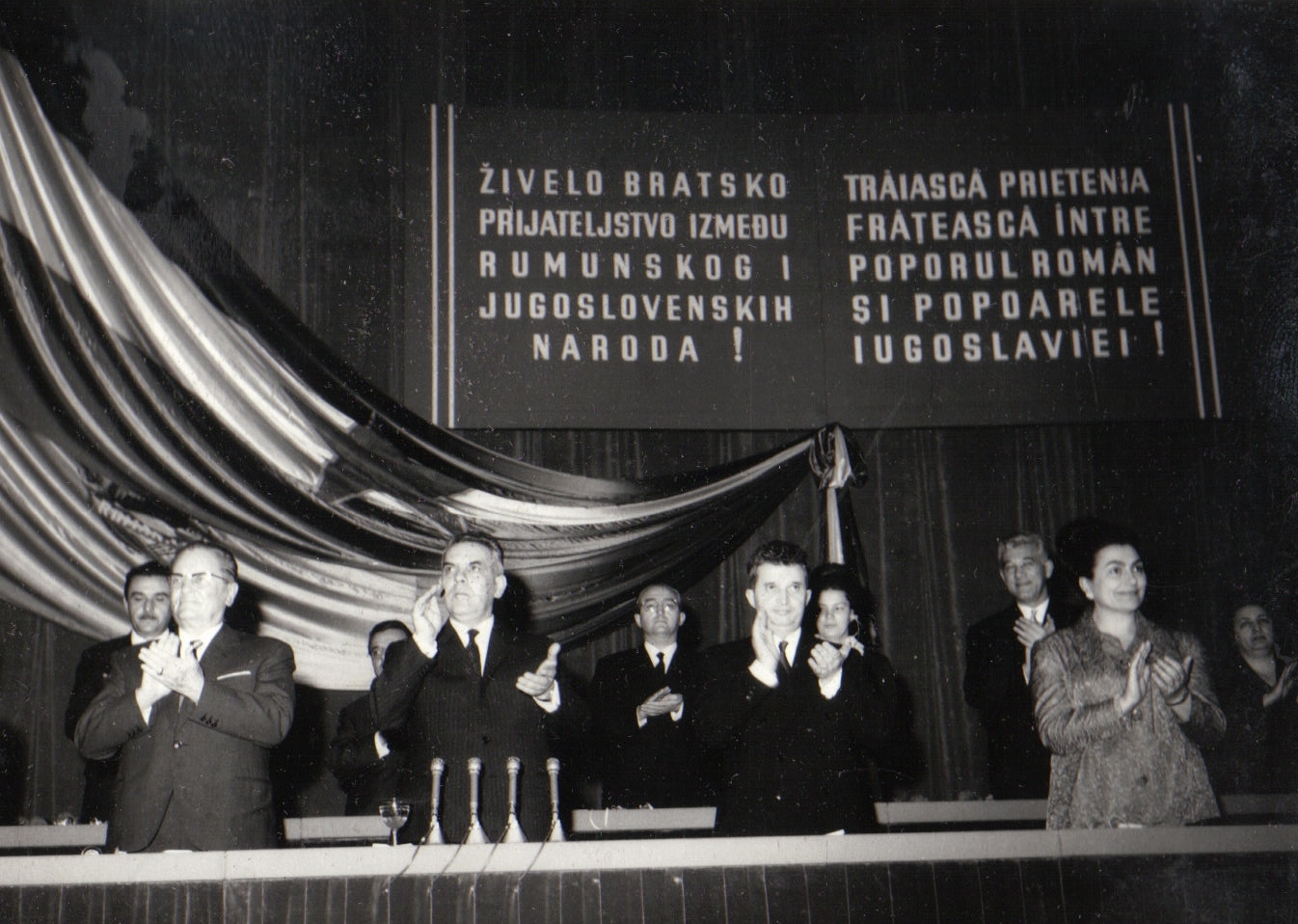
Nicolae Ceaușescu, Josip Broz Tito, Jovanka Broz and other participants at the Romanian-Yugoslav friendship meeting in Bucharest.

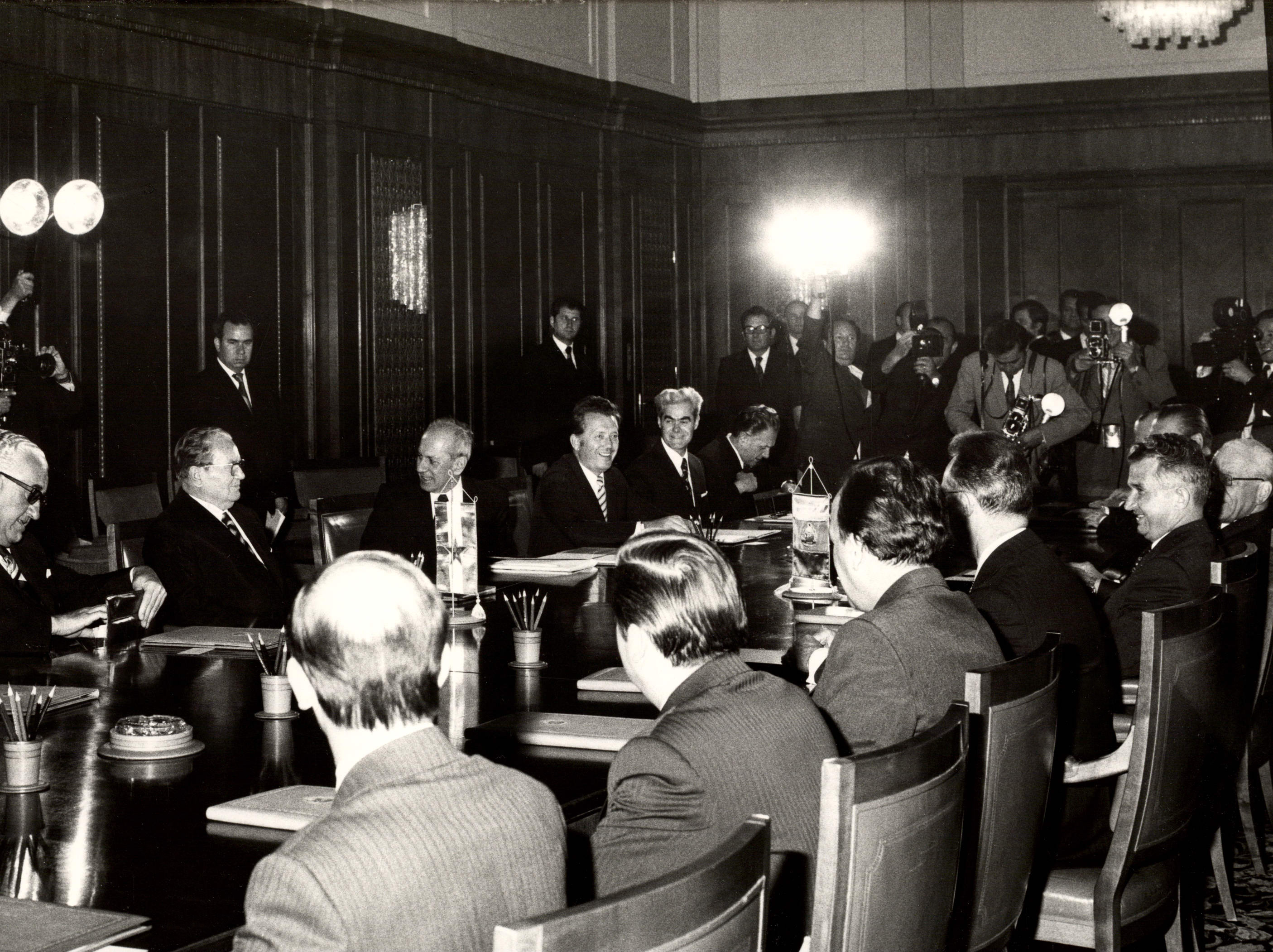
Yugoslav–Romanian talks in 1974 in Bucharest

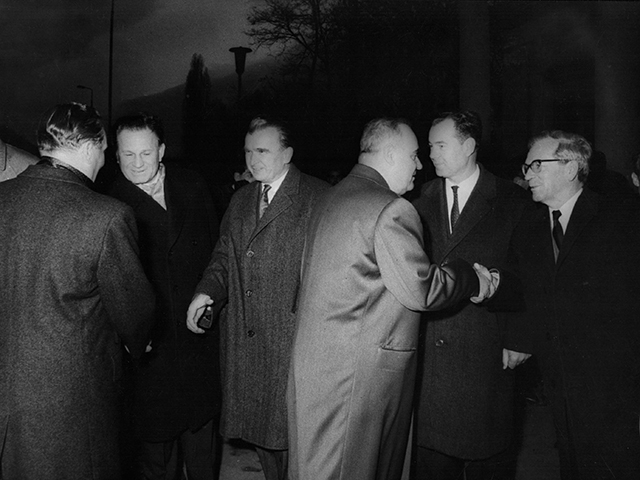
Romanian party delegation visit to Belgrade in 1963

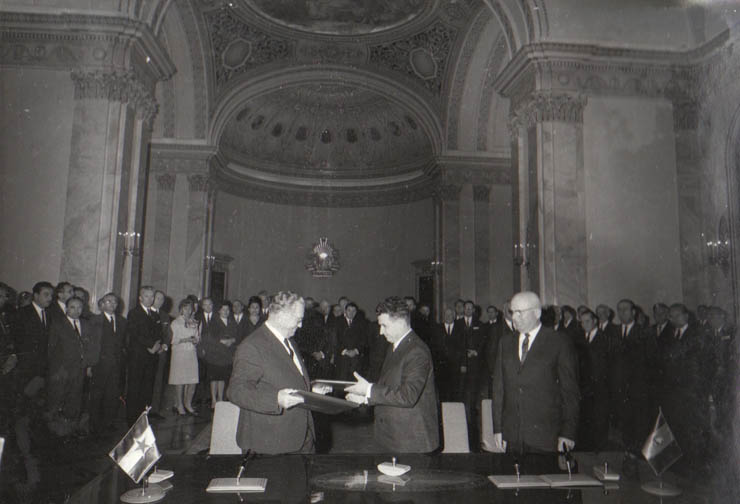
Signing of the Joint Communiqué

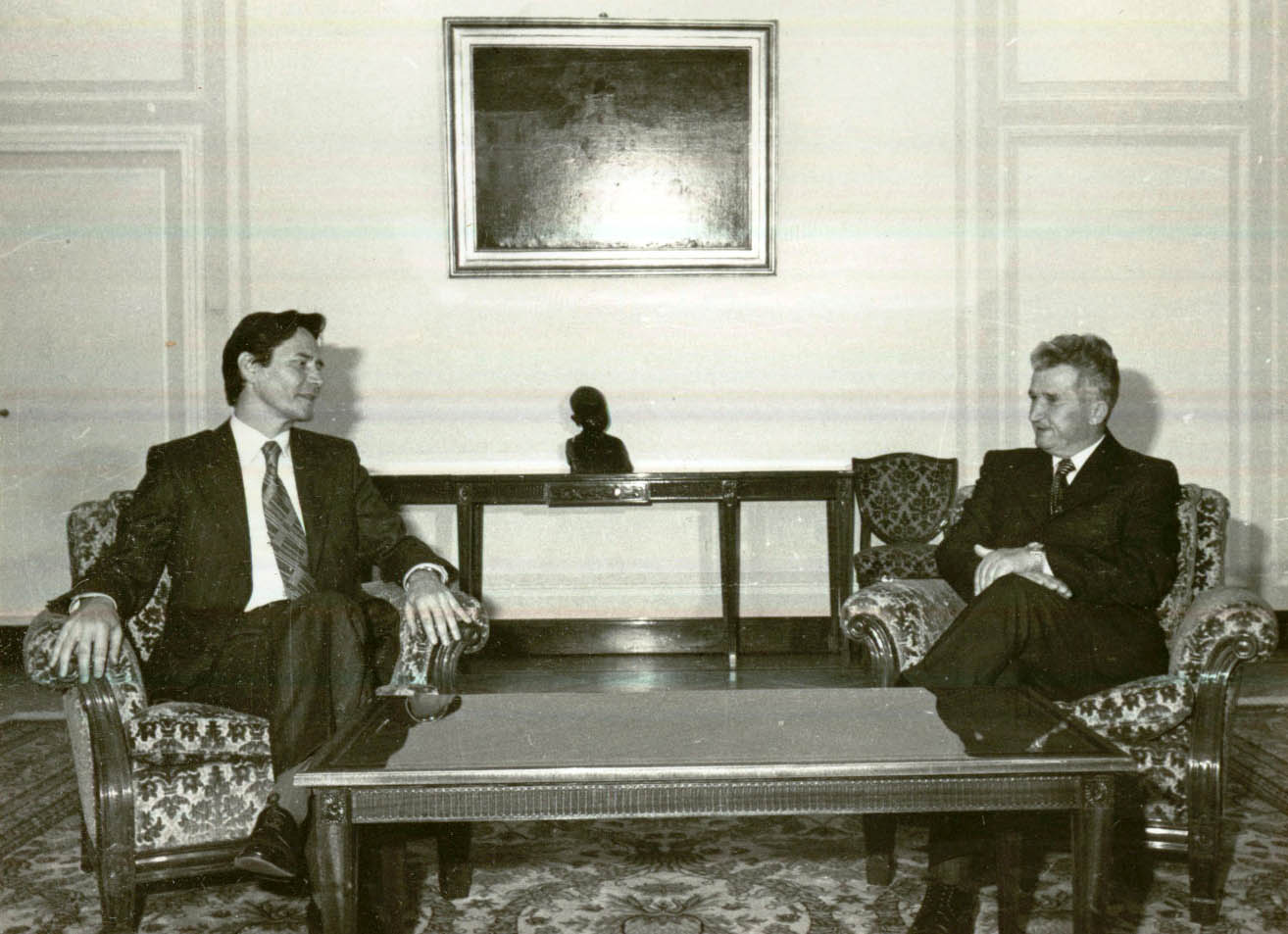
Josip Vrhovec and Nicolae Ceaușescu

=== Breakup of Yugoslavia ===
When the Yugoslav wars broke out, an important trading partner was thus lost for Romania. In 1993 President of Romania Ion Iliescu traveled to Belgrade, Zagreb and Ljubljana to become acquainted with their positions and to offer its "neutral" mediation. During the 1999 NATO bombing of Yugoslavia Romania accepted NATO request and permitted NATO aircraft to use Romanian air space. Official Bucharest was in delicate situation in which it tried to show solidarity with the Atlantic Alliance (to which it wanted to join) while also preserving its traditionally good relations with Serbia. A great majority of Romanians opposed the NATO intervention in Serbia.

== See also ==
- Foreign relations of Romania
- Foreign relations of Yugoslavia
- Group of Nine
- Foreign relations of Bosnia and Herzegovina, Croatia, Montenegro, North Macedonia, Serbia and Slovenia
- Relations between Romania and Bosnia and Herzegovina, Croatia, Montenegro, North Macedonia, Serbia and Slovenia
