= Felnac =

- Commune
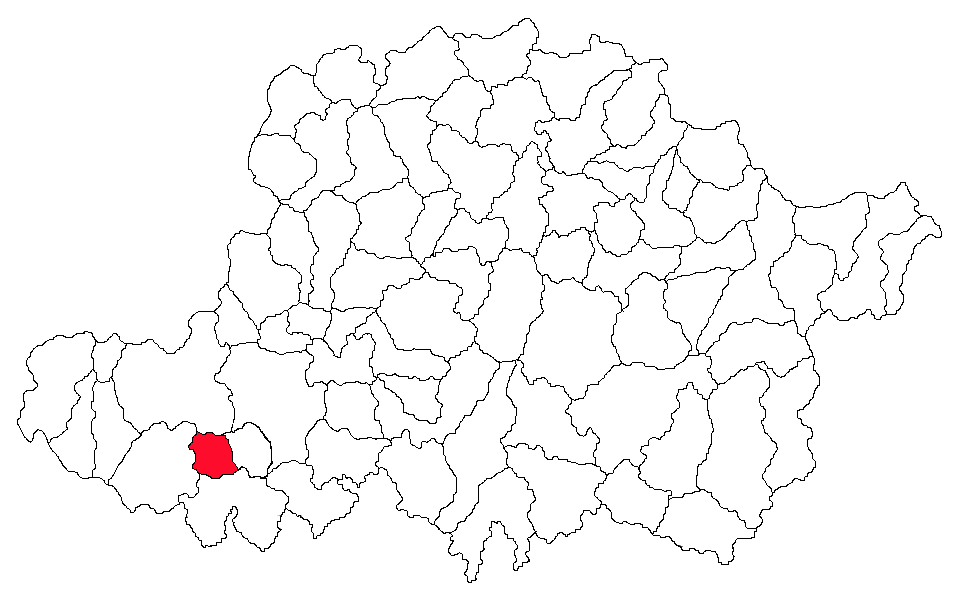
- Location in Arad County

- Location in Romania
- Coordinates: 46°7′N 21°9′E
- Country: Romania
- County: Arad
- Population (2021-12-01): 2,913
- Time zone: EET/EEST (UTC+2/+3)
- Vehicle reg.: AR

Felnac (Hungarian: Fönlak; Serbian: Фелнак) is a commune in Arad County, Romania. Felnac commune is situated in the Vingăi Plateau, on the left side of the Mureș Valley and it surface occupies 5120 ha. It is composed of two villages, Călugăreni (Újvinga) and Felnac (situated at 20 km from Arad). It also included Bodrogu Nou and Zădăreni villages until 2004, when they were split off to form Zădăreni Commune.

== Population ==
According to the 2002 census, the population of the commune is 5182 inhabitants, out of which 87.3% are Romanians, 1.9% Hungarians, 5% Roma, 0.6% Germans, 0.1% Slovaks, 0,5% Ukrainians, 4.3% Serbs and 0.3% are of other or undeclared nationalities.

== History ==
The first documentary record of Felnac dates back to 1330, and of Călugăreni to 1913.

== Economy ==
The economy of the commune is mainly agricultural, plant-growing being well represented.

== Tourism ==
A castle from the 14th century has existed on the territory of the commune, rebuilt in 1500 and demolished in 1699. There are Romanian and Serbian Orthodox churches are also worth visiting, as well as the pleasure-ground with a private piscary.
