= Hodoș-Bodrog Monastery =

Monastery in Romania

- Mănăstirea Hodoș-Bodrog
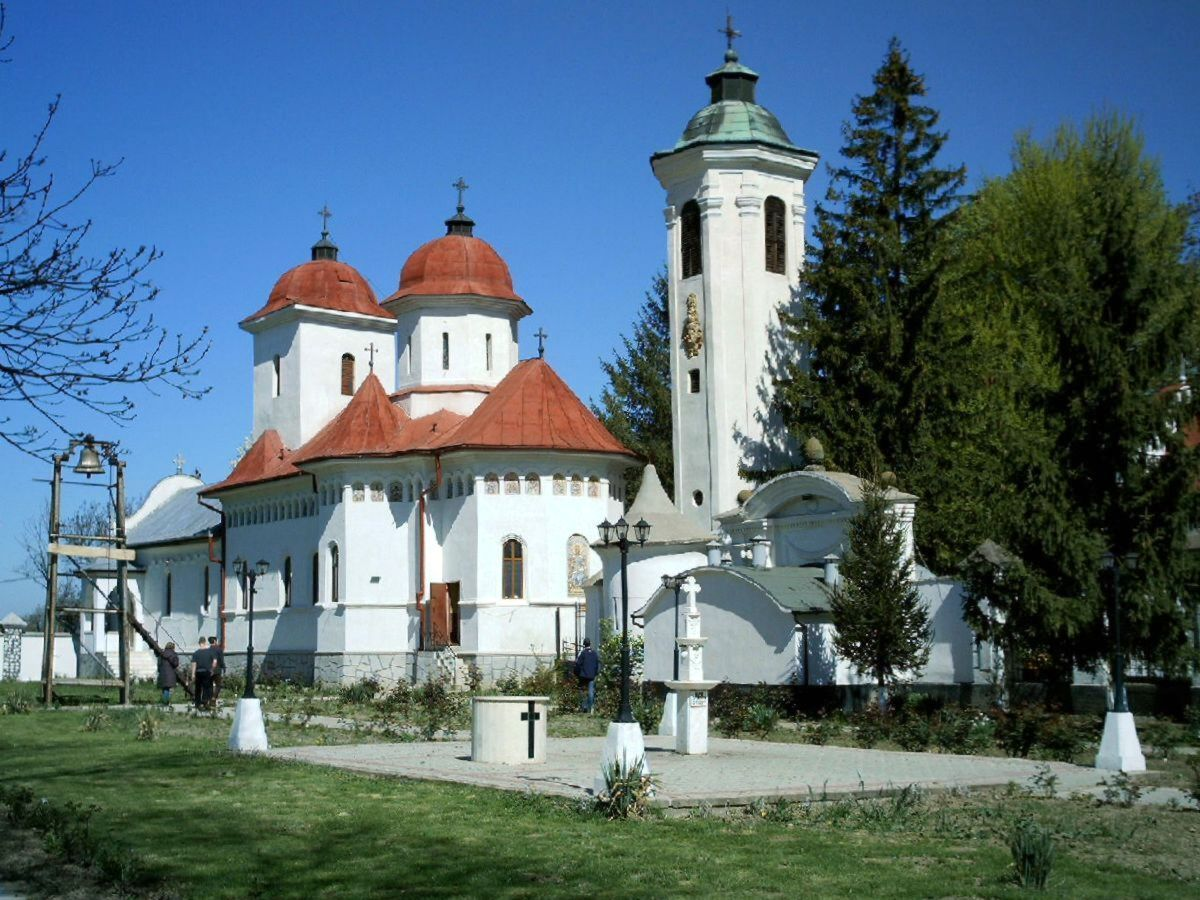
- Interactive map of the Hodoș-Bodrog Monastery area

General information
- Location: Bodrogu Nou, Arad County, Romania
- Coordinates: 46.133253°N 21.183798°E

The Hodoș-Bodrog Monastery (Romanian: Mănăstirea Hodoș-Bodrog) is one of the oldest monastic institutions in Romania. It was originally a Roman Catholic (Benedictine) monastery, built before 1177 and destroyed before 1293. The present monastery, which belongs to the Romanian Orthodox Church, was built near the ruins of the first monastery in the late 14th or early 15th century.

== Benedictine monastery ==
The Benedictine monastery was built for the noble Hodos kindred in Arad County in the Kingdom of Hungary. It was first mentioned as ecclesia de Hudust in a royal charter, issued in 1177. The monastery was dedicated to Saint Peter, according to a 1278 royal charter. Andrew II of Hungary granted a yearly income of 1000 salt cubes to the abbot. The last record of the monastery was made in 1278: in this year, Paul Gutkeled bequeathed the right of patronage of the monastery upon his five nephews. The monastery seems to have been destroyed shortly thereafter, most probably during the rebellion of the Cumans, because Andrew III of Hungary donated the land known as Hudusmonostura – "the monastery of Hodoș" in Hungarian – to one ispán Itemus and his brothers in 1293.

== Orthodox monastery ==
The new Orthodox monastery was built near the ruins of the former abbey in the late 14th or early 15th century. The present church of the monastery was built around 1370, according to a triconch plan (having apses with semi-domes on three sides of a square chamber), at a time when this architecture was spreading to Moldavia and Wallachia, the other Romanian provinces.

The Hodoș-Bodrog Monastery was also under Ottoman domination between 1552 and 1699, as part of the Eyalet of Temeşvar. The Ottoman rule was briefly interrupted for a short time by the struggle for the independence and unification of the Romanian countries, led by Michael the Brave (1595). It is likely that, during the military operations, the monastery suffered serious damages. The monastery was rebuilt at the very beginning of the 18th century, thanks to bishop Sava I Branković (oldest brother of Đorđe Branković), who resided in Lipova and later in Ineu (towns in what is now Arad County, Romania).

In the following decades, although continuing to suffer under the Ottoman rule, and even the hardships induced by the Transylvanian nobility, the monastery housed the residence of the bishops who shepherded this area. Among these were Sofronie, who visited Russia in 1651, and Isaija Đaković, who stayed at Hodoș-Bodrog around 1694 (he would later establish the Hodoș-Bodrog as the seat of the diocese of Ineu and Timișoara).

From the last decade of the 17th century until 1864, the monastery was under the jurisdiction of the metropolitans of Karlowitz, Serbia and was the only contemporary Orthodox monastery of the Arad diocese that faced great difficulties.

The church underwent several restorations throughout the centuries. The original structures were altered to some extent. After the 17th-century restoration, a baroque helmet was added to the dome.

The frescoes in the monastery date from the first decades of the 17th century. Several sacred objects dating from earlier centuries add new values to the artistic treasure of the monastery, including the skull of a bull which dug up an icon of the Virgin Mary at the current site of the church.

Since then the monastery has added a new church, an outdoor summer chapel, and other buildings.

Today, the monastery is within the boundaries of the Mureș Floodplain Natural Park, in the village of Bodrogu Nou (Arad County). The land and monastery are still owned by the Romanian Orthodox Church. However, in 2004 the Mureș Floodplain Natural Park was officially declared to protect and preserve the landscapes along the Mureș River. Because of the proximity of the monastery to the river, the monastery is now inside the natural park.

== Gallery ==
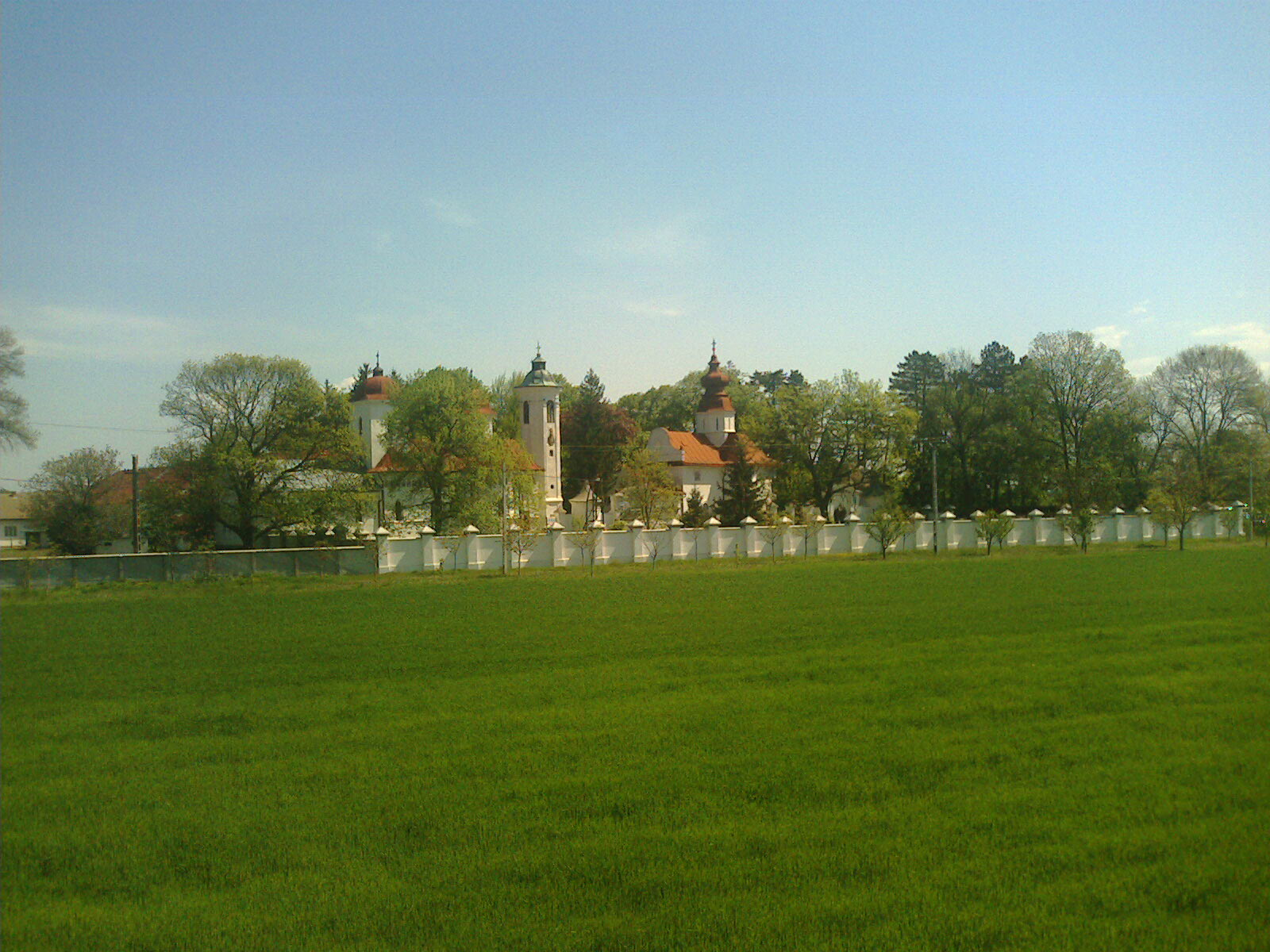
Overview of the Hodoș-Bodrog Monastery from near the Mureș River

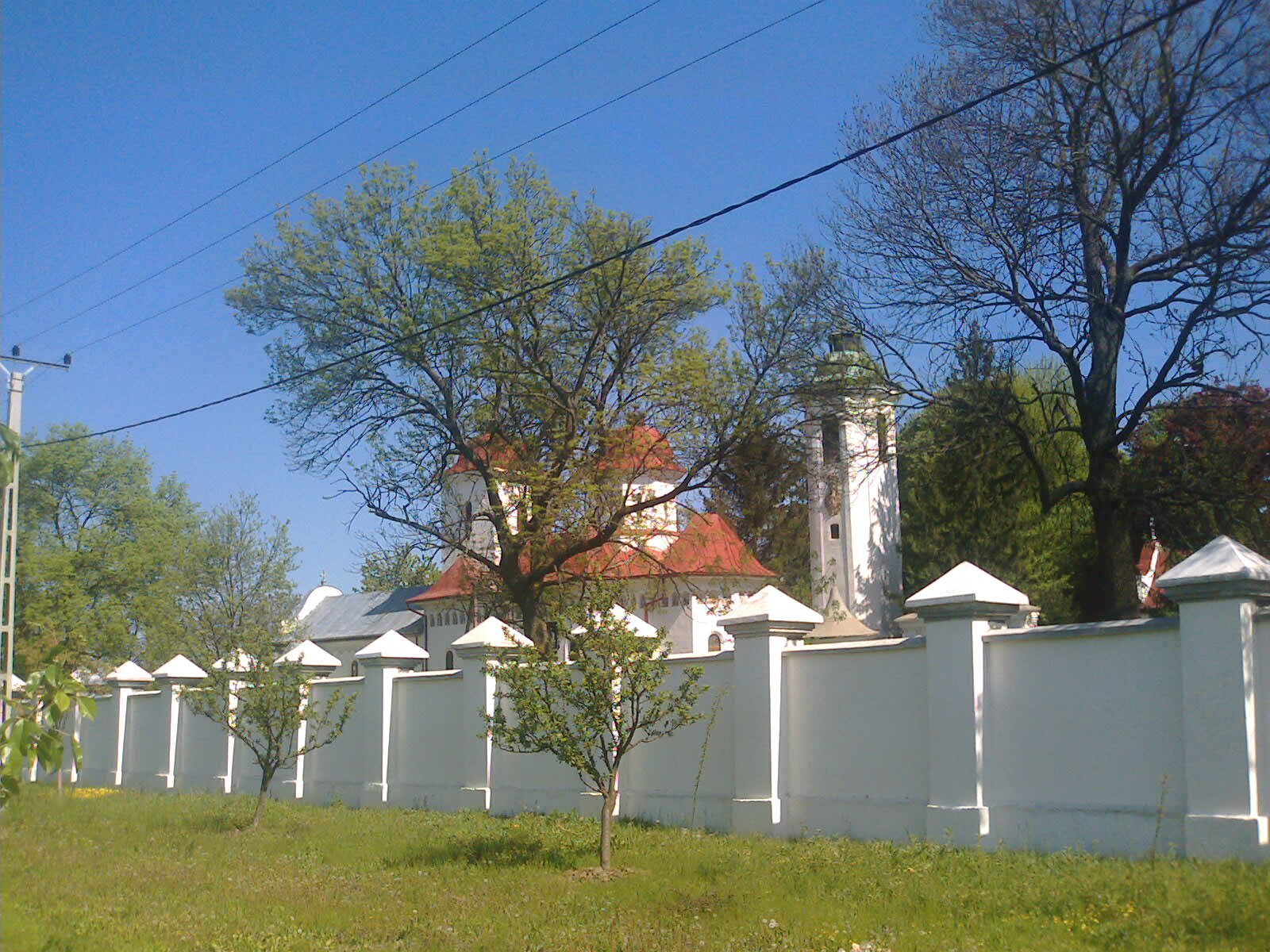
The new church (1989-1997) of the Hodoș-Bodrog Monastery

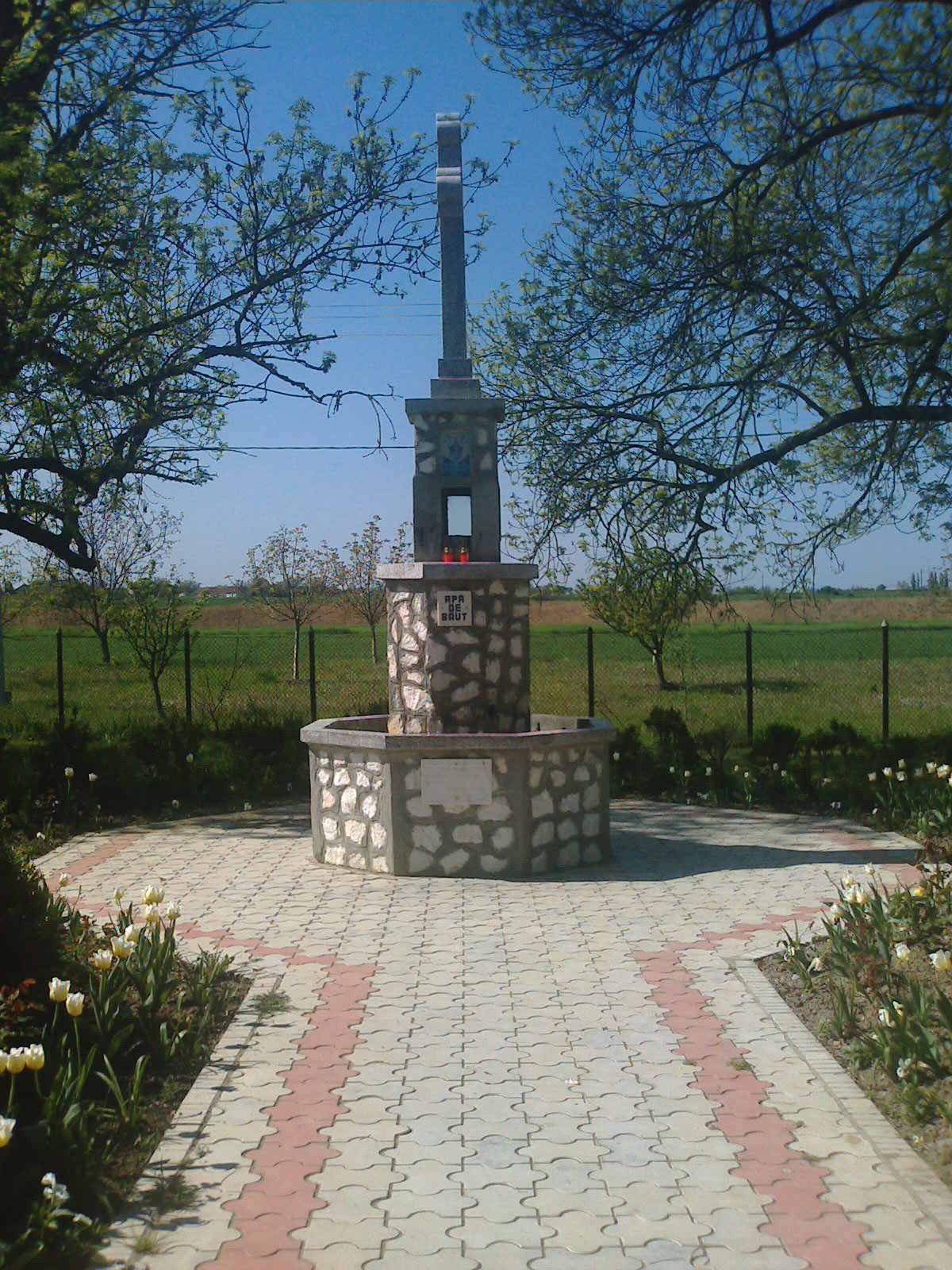
Fountain in the monastery courtyard

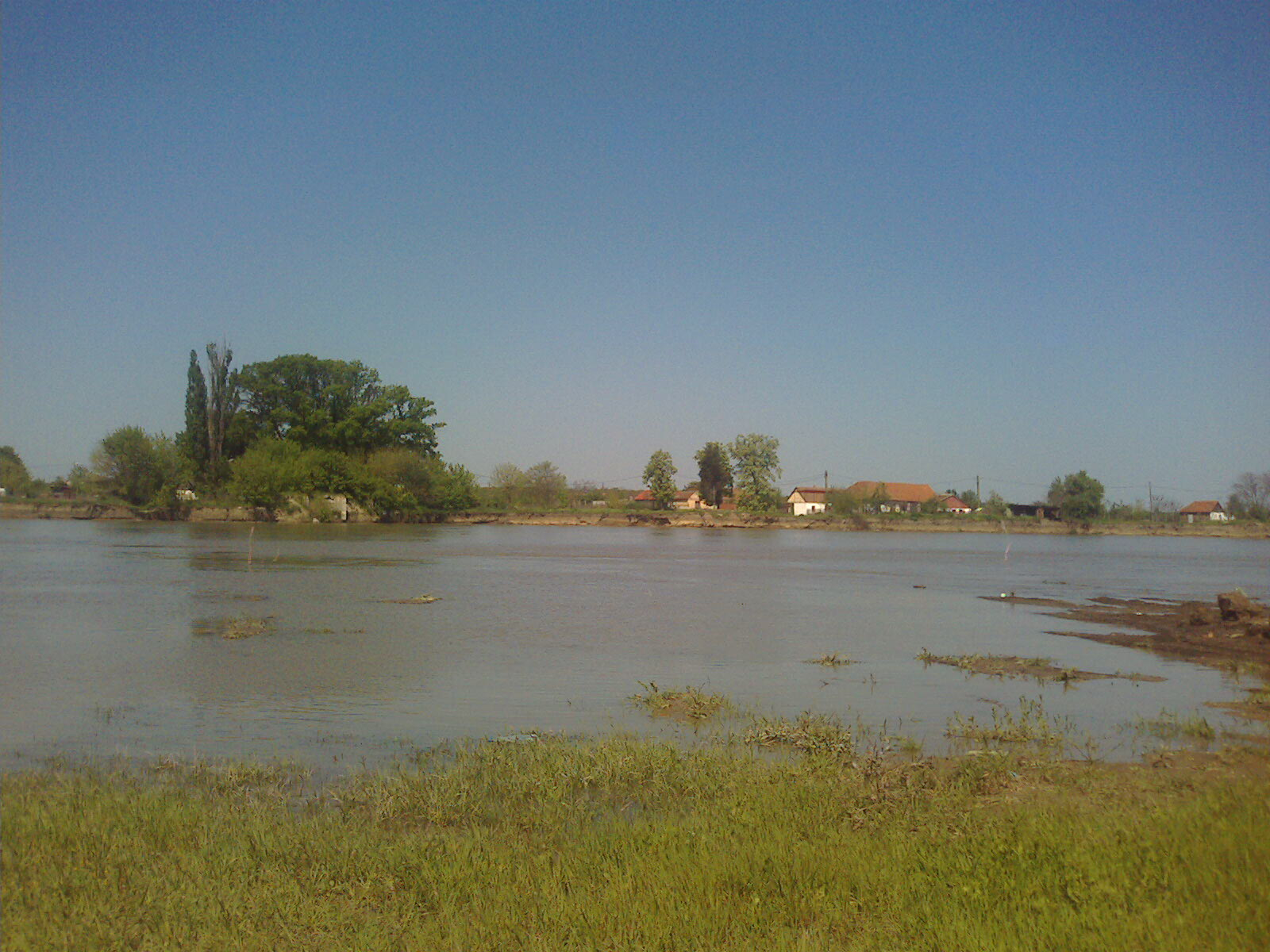
The Mureș River and the village of Bodrogu Vechi near the monastery

== See also ==
- Sveti Đurađ monastery

== Sources ==
- Benkő, Elek (1994). "Hodosbodrog". In Kristó, Gyula; Engel, Pál; Makk, Ferenc (eds.). Korai magyar történeti lexikon (9–14. század) [Encyclopedia of the Early Hungarian History (9th–14th centuries)] (in Hungarian). Akadémiai Kiadó. p. 265. ISBN 963-05-6722-9.
- Berend, Nora; Laszlovszky, József; Szakács, Béla Zsolt (2007). "The kingdom of Hungary". In Berend, Nora (ed.). Christianization and the Rise of Christian Monarchy: Scandinavia, Central Europe and Rus', c.900-1200. Cambridge University Press. pp. 319–368. ISBN 978-0-521-87616-2.
- Györffy, György (1987). Az Árpád-kori Magyarország történeti földrajza, I: Abaújvár, Arad, Árva, Bács, Baranya, Bars, Békés, Bereg, Beszterce, Bihar, Bodrog, Borsod, Brassó, Csanád és Csongrád megye [Historical Geography of Hungary of the Árpáds, Volume I: The Counties of Abaújvár, Arad, Árva, Bács, Baranya, Bars, Békés, Bereg, Beszterce, Bihar, Bodrog, Borsod, Brassó, Csanád and Csongrád] (in Hungarian). Akadémiai Kiadó. ISBN 963-05-4200-5.
- Nestor, Iovan (2003). Sfânta Mănăstirea Hodoș-Bodrog, scurt istoric [Holy Hodoș-Bodrog Monastery: A Short History] (in Romanian).
