= Zădăreni =

- Commune
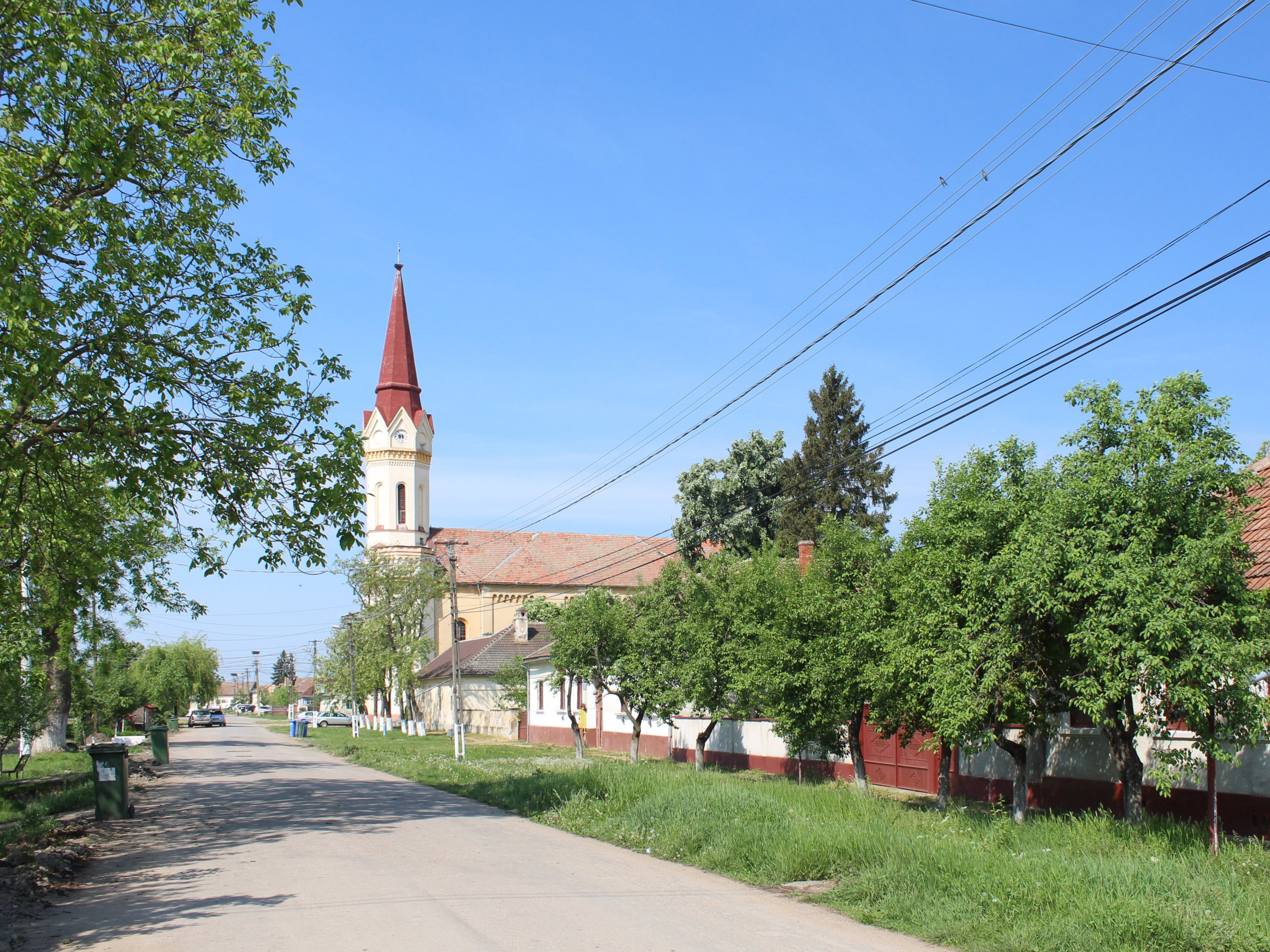
- Road of Zădăreni with the Greek Catholic church, erected in 1777

- Location in Arad County

- Location in Romania
- Coordinates: 46°8′N 21°13′E
- Country: Romania
- County: Arad
- Area: 21.45 km^{2} (8.28 sq mi)
- Elevation: 111 m (364 ft)
- Population (2021-12-01): 2,758
  - Density: 128.6/km^{2} (333.0/sq mi)
- Time zone: UTC+02:00 (EET)
  - Summer (DST): UTC+03:00 (EEST)
- Vehicle reg.: AR

Zădăreni (Alemannic German: Saderlach; Hungarian: Zádorlak) is a commune in Arad County, Romania. It is situated in the northern part of the Vinga Plateau, along the Mureș valley. Its territory occupies 2145 hectares. It is composed of two villages: Bodrogu Nou (Újbodrog) and Zădăreni (situated at 8 km from Arad). These were part of Felnac Commune until 2004, when they were split off.

== Population ==
According to the last census, the population of the commune counts 2323 inhabitants, of which 96.6% are Romanians, 3.1% are Ukrainians and 0.1% are of other or undeclared nationalities.

== History ==
The traces of inhabitancy in Zădăreni can be dated back to antiquity. In the archaeological site called "Cartierul Nou" ("New Quarter") in Zădăreni a settlement from the Iron Age and a Roman necropolis have been found. Despite this fact, Zădăreni was first mentioned only in 1333 while Bodrogu Nou in 1828.

== Tourism ==
The Hodoș-Bodrog Monastery, built in the 12th century, has collections of icons from the 15–18th centuries, including old books, manuscripts, silverware. Roman tools originating from the archaeological excavations effectuated in the monastery courtyard in 1976–77 can also be found there.
