= Buziaș =

- Town
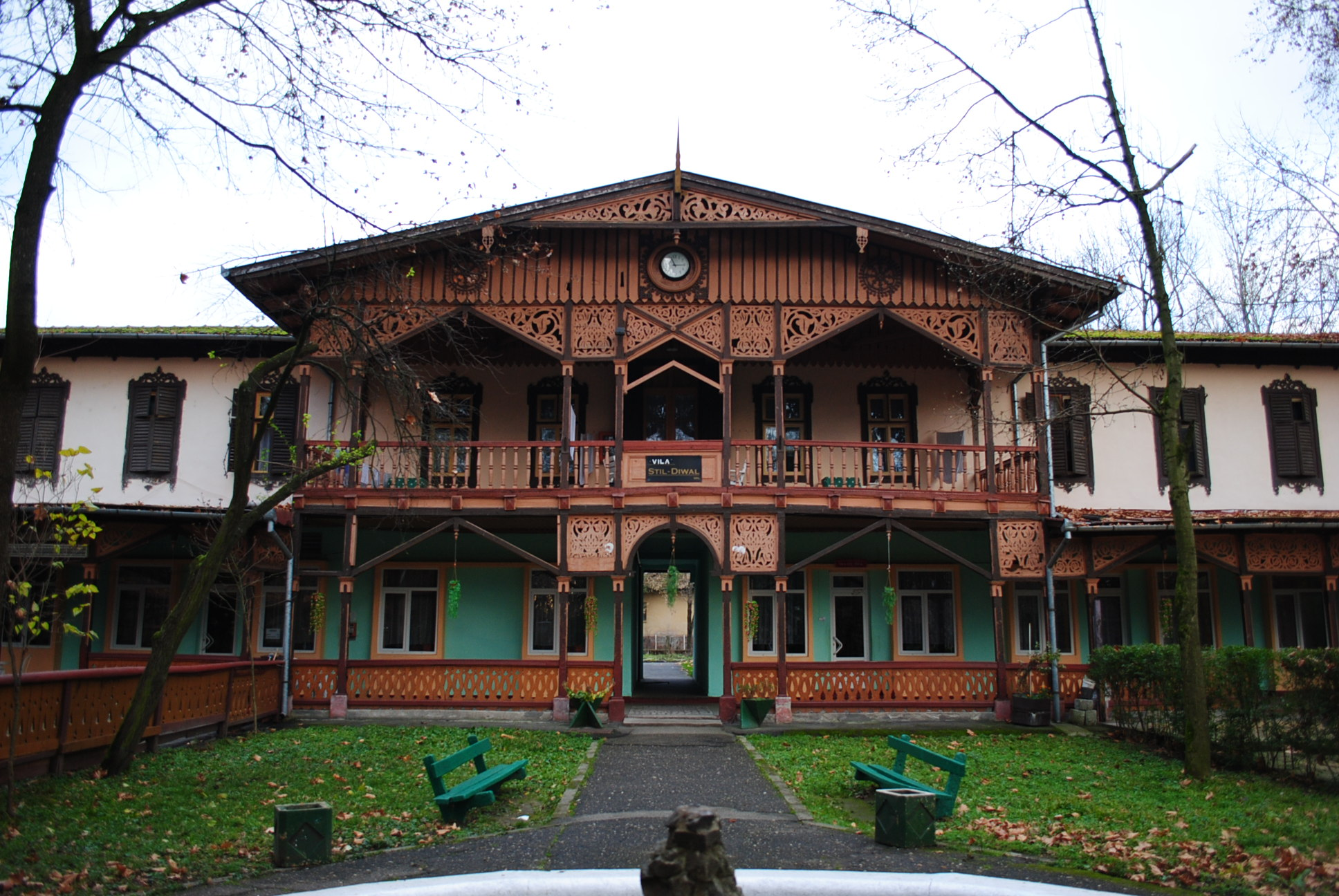
- Bazar villa in the spa complex

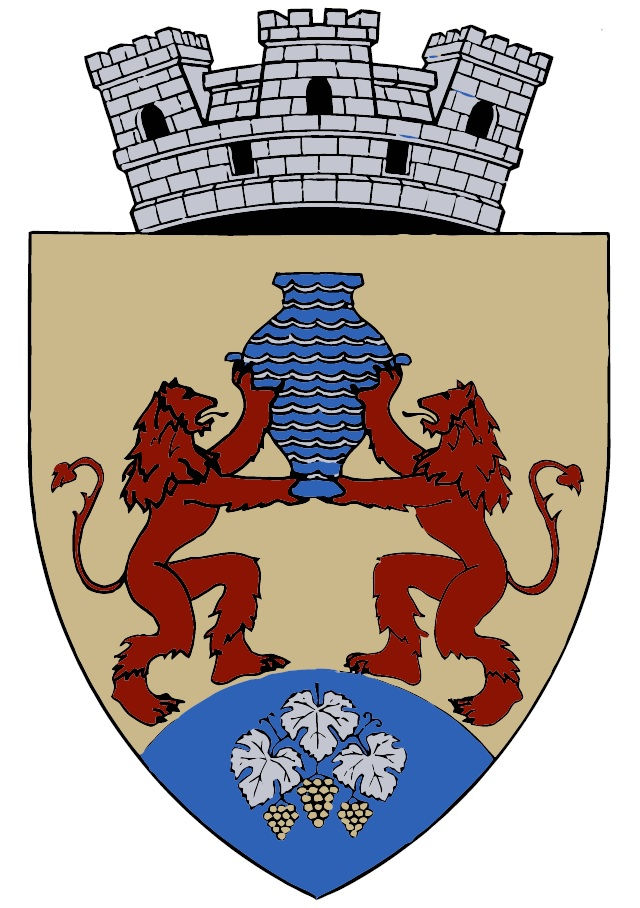
- Coat of arms

- Location in Timiș County

- Location in Romania
- Coordinates: 45°37′50″N 21°35′18″E
- Country: Romania
- County: Timiș

Government
  - Mayor (2024–2028): Sorin Munteanu (PNL)
- Area: 104 km^{2} (40 sq mi)
- Elevation: 128 m (420 ft)
- Population (2021-12-01): 6,834
  - Density: 65.7/km^{2} (170/sq mi)
- Time zone: UTC+02:00 (EET)
  - Summer (DST): UTC+03:00 (EEST)
- Postal code: 305100–305102
- Vehicle reg.: TM
- Website: www.primariabuzias.ro

Buziaș (also known as Băile Buziaș or Buziaș-Băi; Hungarian: Buziásfürdő; German: Busiasch; Serbian: Бузјаш, romanized: Buzjaš) is a town in Timiș County, Romania. Thanks to its healing springs, it was once one of the most famous bathing places in Hungary and then in Romania; it has appeared in several international catalogs and has often been referred to as the "Pearl of Banat" or the "Bad Nauheim of Banat".

Called Ahibis by the Romans, Buziaș was first mentioned by Charles I of Hungary in a document from 1321. Until the early 19th century, it was an insignificant village away from the main routes. It owes its reputation to the healing effects of local mineral springs, which were first analyzed in 1811. In 1911 it was officially declared a spa resort of national interest.

It administers two villages: Bacova and Silagiu.

== Etymology ==
Kisch proposed that the Romanian name may derive from boz (from the Slavic boz, meaning "elder tree") combined with the suffix -iaș, where the unstressed o shifted to u. Iordan classified this toponym under Boz, a name possibly of Hungarian origin—or at least influenced by Hungarian—while noting that Petrovici supported a Slavic root bŭzŭ, reflected in the Romanian boz. The folk form Bâzâieș suggests the presence of an ă or a similar vowel following the initial B-, a feature also found in Bulgarian forms like бъз/bŭz and бъзей/bŭzeĭ.

== Geography ==
Buziaș is located in western Romania, about 35 km (22 mi) from Timișoara and 25 km (16 mi) from Lugoj, being connected to both by county road DJ592 and the Timișoara–Buziaș–Lugoj railway. The town lies on the upper terrace of the Timiș River, at the contact between the Eastern Banat Plain and the Banat Hills. Buziaș has an area of 104 km^{2} (40 sq mi) and borders Racovița to the north, Darova and Boldur to the east, Chevereșu Mare and Nițchidorf to the west, and Caraș-Severin County to the south.

=== Hydrography ===
The 9-kilometre-long (5.6 mi) Salcia stream, along which the town lies, springs from the Dumbrava Forest, being a tributary on the left of the Șurgani River. In the Buziaș area, Salcia receives a series of tributaries: the Pârporii, Silagiului, and Strâmba streams. Apparently insignificant waters, during the rainy periods they produced floods, such as those of 1926 and 1966, which led to the elaboration of a program of hydrographic arrangement of the area. This is how two accumulation lakes were created nearby:

- one in the Salcia Valley, with an area of 20 ha (49 acres) during rainy periods and 1 ha (2.5 acres) in the rest of the year, and
- another in the Silagiului Valley, with an area of 26 ha (64 acres) during rainy periods and 1 ha in the rest of the year.

=== Climate ===
Buziaș is characterized by a moderate temperate continental climate, with transitional characters between the continental and the Mediterranean climate, under the influences of the air masses propagated from the Mediterranean. Due to the favorable natural conditions, with rich mineral springs but also with a mild climate, Buziaș has been recognized as a potential spa resort by the existence of carbon dioxide springs.

The average annual temperature is between –2 and 21.5 °C. The average annual rainfall varies between 600 and 650 mm, the maximums being recorded in June and November. The snow cover reaches a thickness of between 0.9 cm (November) and 18 cm in January. The relative humidity has annual values of 75.7% and, due to the evaporation of CO_{2}-laden water, the absolute humidity is lower in the morning and higher during the day. The average annual cloudiness measures 5.6 tenths and is higher in winter. The prevailing winds in the cold seasons are those that come from the south and bring warm air, which makes the autumn and winter milder.

=== Flora ===
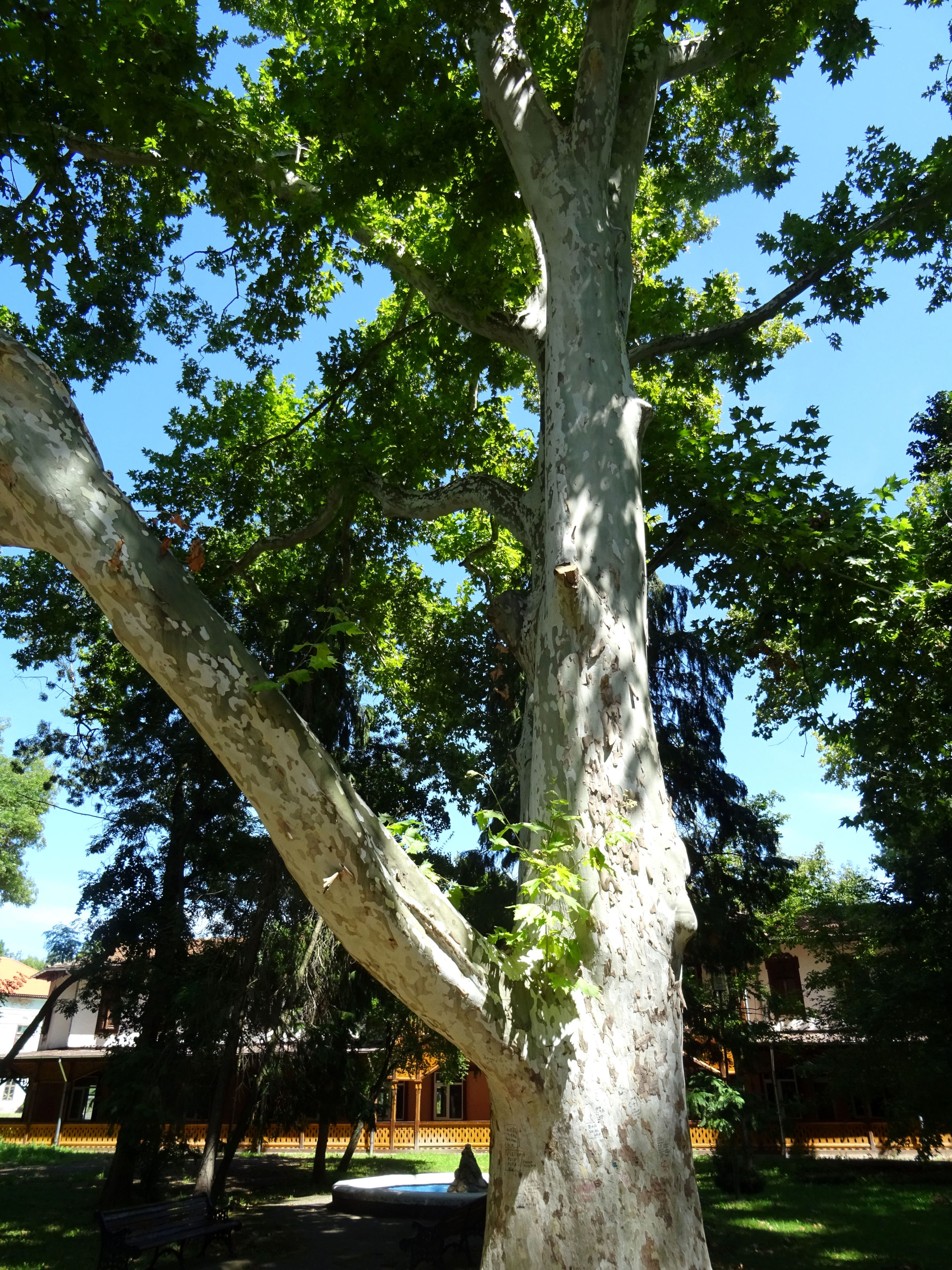
A plane tree in the town park

Due to the climate and topography, the area is characterized by steppe vegetation with isolated deciduous forests.

The agricultural area has the largest extent in the Buziaș area; maize, wheat and sunflower are grown here. The hilly and sub-hilly parts around Silagiu and Buziaș correspond to an arboreal vegetation formed by deciduous forests: pedunculate oak, sessile oak, hornbeam, ash and, less commonly, linden, aspen, wild cherry, crab apple and other species. The existence of these forests from ancient times is demonstrated today by the secular oak from Silagiu, in Măgironi Valley, with a base diameter of 1.8 m and an estimated age of over 500 years. Frequent shrubs of these forests are: hawthorn, privet, Tatar maple, hazel, blackthorn, dog rose, cornel, elder, etc. 4 km east of the town is the 1821-ha Dumbrava Forest, consisting mainly of oaks, which has been declared a Natura 2000 site.

An important area is occupied by vines, on the northern slope of the Silagiu Hill, which has a maximum altitude of 324 m (1,063 ft). There are also planted fruit trees, but on small areas. The wine region of which it is part is one of the five wine centers of Banat. The most famous wines in this region are Blaufränkisch, Merlot and Welschriesling. If in 1919 Silagiu had about 579 ha (1,430 acres) of vines, today 849 ha (2,100 acres) are cultivated with vines.

The town park is characterized by the presence of ornamental species from around the world such as conifers (fir, cedar, pine), deciduous trees (plane, linden, Turkish hazel, maple, birch, poplar, oak, elm, willow) and flowers (tulip, gladiolus, primula, pansy, Canterbury bells, carnation, peony, hyacinth).

=== Fauna ===
The fauna around Buziaș is varied, according to the existing landforms.

The two forest bodies (Silagiu and Dumbrava) have a varied fauna, there being an area of interference between the fauna descending from the Semenic Mountains, the steppe and forest-steppe fauna and its own fauna:

- mammals: squirrel, hare, deer, wolf (rarely), fox, wild boar, wildcat, badger, hamster, ground squirrel, etc. In the past, many squirrels lived in the town park, which had become the mascots of the park, but now their population is quite small.
- birds: blackbird, tit, grey partridge, woodpecker, jay, pheasant, leaf warbler, starling, turtle dove, wild goose, wild duck, goshawk, eagle-owl, etc.

== History ==
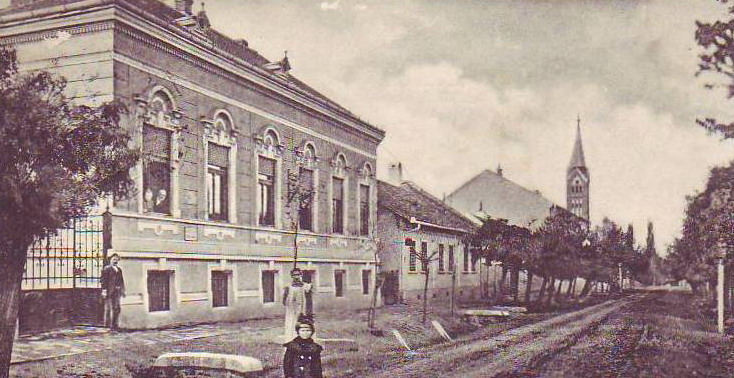
Buziaș at the beginning of the 20th century

The settlement has been known since Roman times, under the name of Ahibis, a name that also appears on Tabula Peutingeriana. Medieval Hungarian documents mention the settlement under various names: Kysbuzyas (1320), Buzus (1369), and Bezias during the reign of King Ladislaus. In 1457 and 1482, the village of Bozas included individuals with patronymic names such as Stanciu, Nicolae, and Valahul. By 1716, under Habsburg rule, the village was referred to as Buzieschi and was inhabited by Romanian serfs. In 1820, around 60 Hungarian and Slovak families from the Bratislava (Pozsony) and Árva regions settled in the area, followed in 1825 by approximately 200 German and Czech families.

According to some historians (Al. Borza, D. Tudor), its mineral waters have been known since ancient times, although the first reliable sources date back to the Middle Ages. The oldest analysis of the mineral waters from Buziaș was made in 1796 by Timișoara pharmacist Cecchini. The analyzes were repeated in 1800 and 1804 by Timișoara doctor Ignatz Peltz and pharmacist Karol Klapka, the conclusion being that water can be used by both humans and animals. Following the analyzes of 1811 and 1817 by professor Paul Kitaibel, the mineral waters of Buziaș were recognized for their therapeutic value, and in 1819 Buziaș was officially declared a spa resort, being leased to entrepreneurs Hans Rauth and János Simsó.

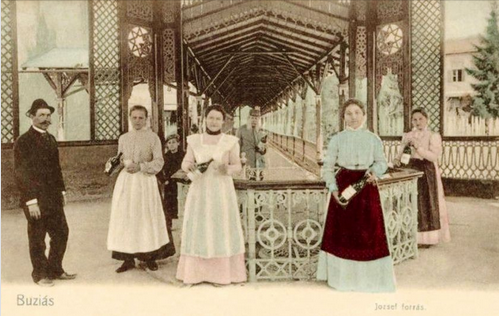
Iosif spring and the colonnade c. 1900

The one who will decisively drive the development of Buziaș is Ágoston Trefort. Trefort, Minister of Religion and Education since 1872, consistently supported the cause of Buziaș. Through his support, important investments were made: the hot bath was built; the imperial colonnade connecting the springs and the casino was erected (similar promenades are found in Europe only in Karlovy Vary and Baden-Baden); the theater was built (1872); and the free swimming pool was opened (1874). In 1875, also with Trefort's support, the park with plane trees and many rare species will be laid out on a plot of 20 ha. The inauguration in 1896 of 31-km-long Timișoara–Buziaș railway, the introduction in 1897 of lighting with oil lamps, the arrangement of streets and the modernization in 1898 of ferruginous bath also contributed to the notoriety of this resort. The town was visited in person by Emperor Franz Joseph I and his heir, Franz Ferdinand, in September 1898.

Between 1903 and 1907, 12 deep springs were drilled and a mineral water bottling plant was built, and in 1909 the mineral water was marketed under the name Muschong Phönix. The factory became operational in 1907, with an area of 700 m^{2} (7,500 sq ft) and a bottling capacity of 1.5 million bottles per year and 1,000 kg of carbon dioxide. After the union of Banat with Romania, Buziaș maintained its status as a spa resort for cardiovascular treatment and was a plasă seat. It was declared a town in 1956. In the 1960s the economic activity diversifies, small units of the light and food industry are created. Both the population and the area of the town increased. Blocks of flats, villas, and hotels were built for the resort.

== Demographics ==
Ethnic composition (2021)
1. Romanians (82.1%)
2. Roma (4.31%)
3. Hungarians (1.84%)
4. Germans (1.21%)
5. Unknown (9.81%)
6. Others (0.73%)
Religious composition (2021)
1. Orthodox (77.0%)
2. Roman Catholics (5.47%)
3. Pentecostals (4.47%)
4. Unknown (10.4%)
5. Others (2.40%)
6. Irreligious, atheists and agnostics (0.33%)

Buziaș had a population of 6,834 inhabitants at the 2021 census, down 2.69% from the 2011 census. Most inhabitants are Romanians (82.1%), larger minorities being represented by Roma (4.31%), Hungarians (1.84%) and Germans (1.21%). For 9.81% of the population, ethnicity is unknown. By religion, most inhabitants are Orthodox (76.95%), but there are also minorities of Roman Catholics (5.47%) and Pentecostals (4.47%). For 10.38% of the population, religious affiliation is unknown.

Census		Ethnic composition
Year	Population	Romanians	Hungarians	Germans	Roma	Slovaks
1880	6,091	2,552	653	2,705	–	110
1890	6,776	2,828	711	3,146	–	44
1900	7,191	2,955	902	3,268	–	29
1910	7,141	2,972	1,109	2,971	–	46
1920	6,651	2,767	599	3,175	–	–
1930	6,764	2,680	719	3,155	85	32
1941	6,547	2,725	504	3,090	–	–
1956	7,203	3,927	587	2,475	123	20
1966	7,310	4,436	538	2,244	23	15
1977	7,976	5,252	484	1,970	179	21
1992	8,041	6,764	385	517	267	53
2002	7,772	6,791	316	281	270	49
2011	7,023	5,844	207	151	209	33
2021	6,834	5,611	126	83	295	20

== Politics and administration ==
The town of Buziaș is administered by a mayor and a local council composed of 15 councilors. The mayor, Sorin Munteanu, from the National Liberal Party, has been in office since 2016. As from the 2024 local elections, the local council has the following composition by political parties:

Party	Seats	Composition
National Liberal Party	7	
Social Democratic Party	3	
Alliance for the Union of Romanians	2	
Social Liberal Humanist Party	2	
Force of the Right	1	

== Culture ==
From the second half of the 19th century, Buziaș was characterized by a lively cultural life. A printing house was founded in 1881, where a local newspaper was printed in German between 1892 and 1897, and in Hungarian between 1901 and 1915. In addition to these, several other prints by awarded beekeeper Miklós Grand were published here. The Romanian amateur theater group was founded in 1895, the Hungarian one in 1903; a puppet theater was also founded in 1901. From 1898 to 1918, the local branch of the Transylvanian Association for Romanian Literature and the Culture of the Romanian People (ASTRA) operated here.

In the second half of the 20th century, a cinema (Dinamo) and a house of culture were built. The latter organizes several cultural and artistic events and has a performance hall and a summer theater. Its current library was founded in 1952 by merging the former communal library with that of the spa unit. In the lobby of the library there is an exhibition of photographs and artifacts related to the history of Buziaș and a room where the dolls and decorations used by the former puppet theater are exhibited. There were no fewer than three light music bands in the town, the best known being the Șah Mat rock band from the 1980s.

The town has two museums. Opened in 1987 in the former Gorjup villa next to the park, the Buziaș Balneary Museum (Romanian: Muzeul Balnear Buziaș) contains a collection of photomontages illustrating the history of Buziaș, Neolithic vessels, and Thracian pottery, furniture from the 19th century and sanitary objects once used in spas. Also in the 1980s, the Iuliana Folea Troceanu Ethnographic Museum opened in an old farmhouse on Șaguna Street, where nearly five hundred Romanian folk art objects from the Buziaș area can be seen.

== Economy ==
For almost two centuries, medical tourism has been the basis of Buziaș's economy. The first health facilities and springs were established in 1816, and in 1819 it was declared a spa resort. In the 1870s it had 500 to 600 visitors a year, and in the 1890s it had more than 1,200 visitors; some of them stayed in private houses, others in villas and hotels. From the 1890s, tourism began to decline; in 2015 it accounted for only 6% of the town's total turnover.

Its mineral waters were bottled almost uninterruptedly between 1840 and 2014. In 1811, doctor Adalbert Lindenmayer made excavations, discovering the sources of the Iosif and Mihai springs, springs that functioned until 1973. In 1840, balneologist Gheorghe Ciocârlan started bottling water from Buziaș in a building behind the Iosif spring, the first bottling station having a capacity of 2,000 bottles per year. In the mid-19th century, c. 1850, the water from Buziaș was mentioned in the foreign press as a "luxury drink that can be used together with wine, being an excellent refreshment". Documents from 1871 mention the existence of eight water sources, of which three drinking springs and five bathing springs. The first drilling, about 20–30 metres (66–98 ft) deep, took place three years later, in 1874. Due to the very good results, the first thermal water pool, called Notatoriul, was built, while the amount of bottled water reached at 15,000 bottles a year. Until 1875, the water from Buziaș came to be sold in Timișoara, Lugoj, Sibiu, Caransebeș, Budapest, and Novi Sad. In 1893 the resort was bought by Budapest manufacturer Erwin Scottola, who developed the trade with bottled mineral water by introducing porcelain stoppers with rubber lining. In 1906 the resort was acquired by manufacturer Jacob Muschong and remained in the possession of the Muschong-Patianski family until its nationalization, in 1948. Also in 1906, construction began on the mineral water plant, which was inaugurated on 23 July 1907, under the name Phönix. The factory had an area of 700 m^{2} (7,500 sq ft), 36 employees, and a bottling capacity of 1.5 million bottles per year. The plant has weathered the regime change, but closed in early 2014 due to declining demand and lagging technology.

The agricultural land of the town is nearly 10,000 hectares (25,000 acres) in size. The main local crops are corn, wheat and sunflowers. There are vineyards and orchards on the Silagiu Hills. Vineyards were mentioned as early as 1825, but wine production did not flourish until the second half of the 19th century, after the Swabians in Bacova began cultivating the vineyards. It also had a significant apiary, and the Beekeepers' Association of Southern Hungary (Hungarian: Délmagyarországi Méhészegylet) was established here in 1873.

In the second half of the 20th century, forced industrialization, typical of communism, took place; Electromotor, Modern, TCMT, and Garofița factories, among others, were built at that time. After the Romanian Revolution of December 1989, most factories closed down after unsuccessful privatization; moreover, more than 80% of companies established after 1989 went bankrupt by 2015. Due to the high land prices in Timișoara in the 2010s, more and more industrial companies moved to Buziaș, creating new job opportunities. In 2015, trade accounted for 31% of the town's total turnover, agriculture for 23%, construction for 22%, industry for 15%, and tourism and services for 9%.

Aqua Park of Buziaș

As the resort’s main development project, Buziaș is preparing a large-scale water park using thermo-mineral water, an investment that, in the first phase of development, will amount to more than €12 million.

== Notable people ==
- Jenő Radisics (1856–1917), art historian
- Alisz Goriupp (1894–1979), librarian, press historian and bibliographer
- Endre Misteth (1912–2006), bridge engineer
- Helga Bîrsan (born 1928), gymnast

== Gallery ==
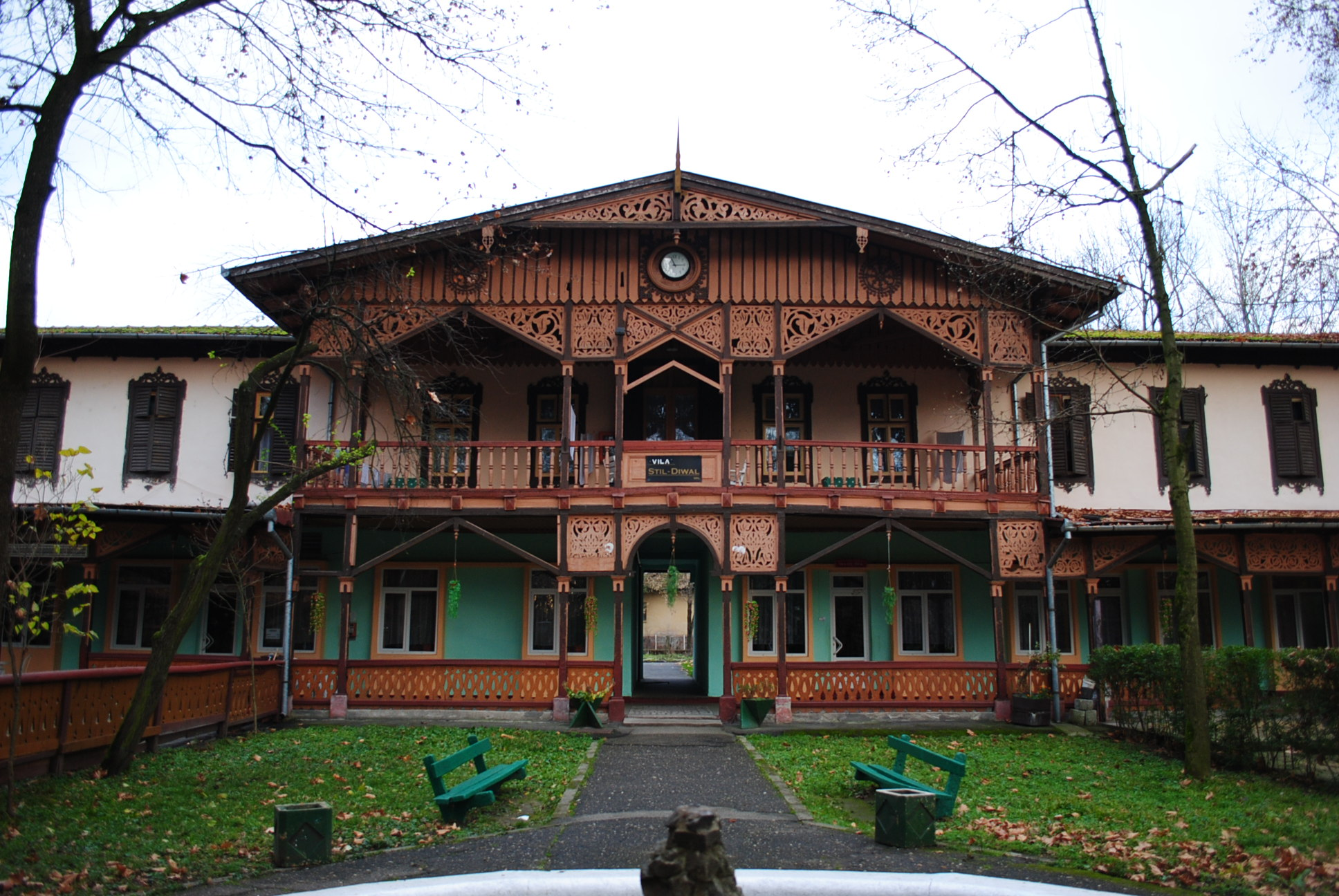
Bazar villa in the spa complex

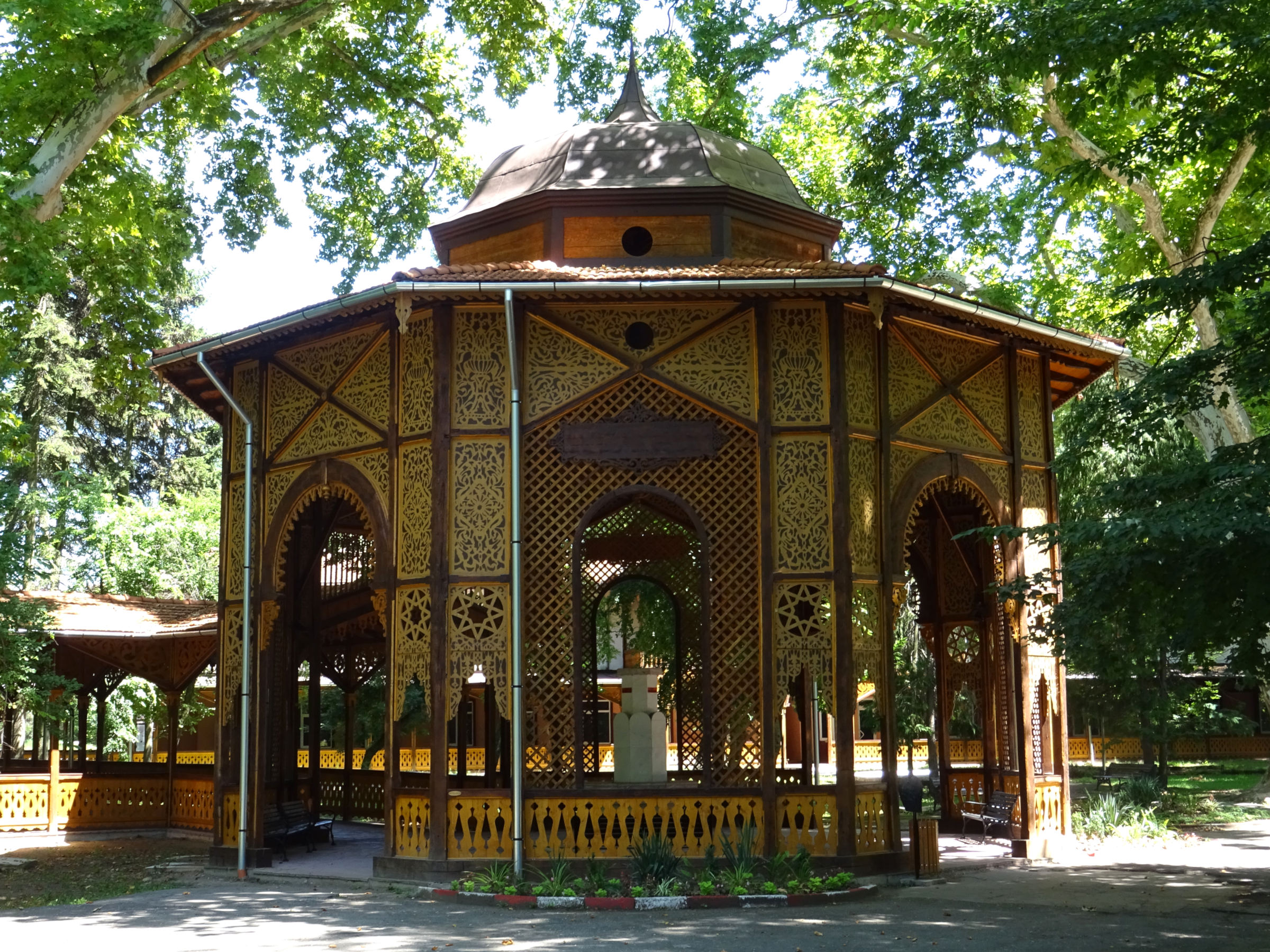
The imperial colonnade

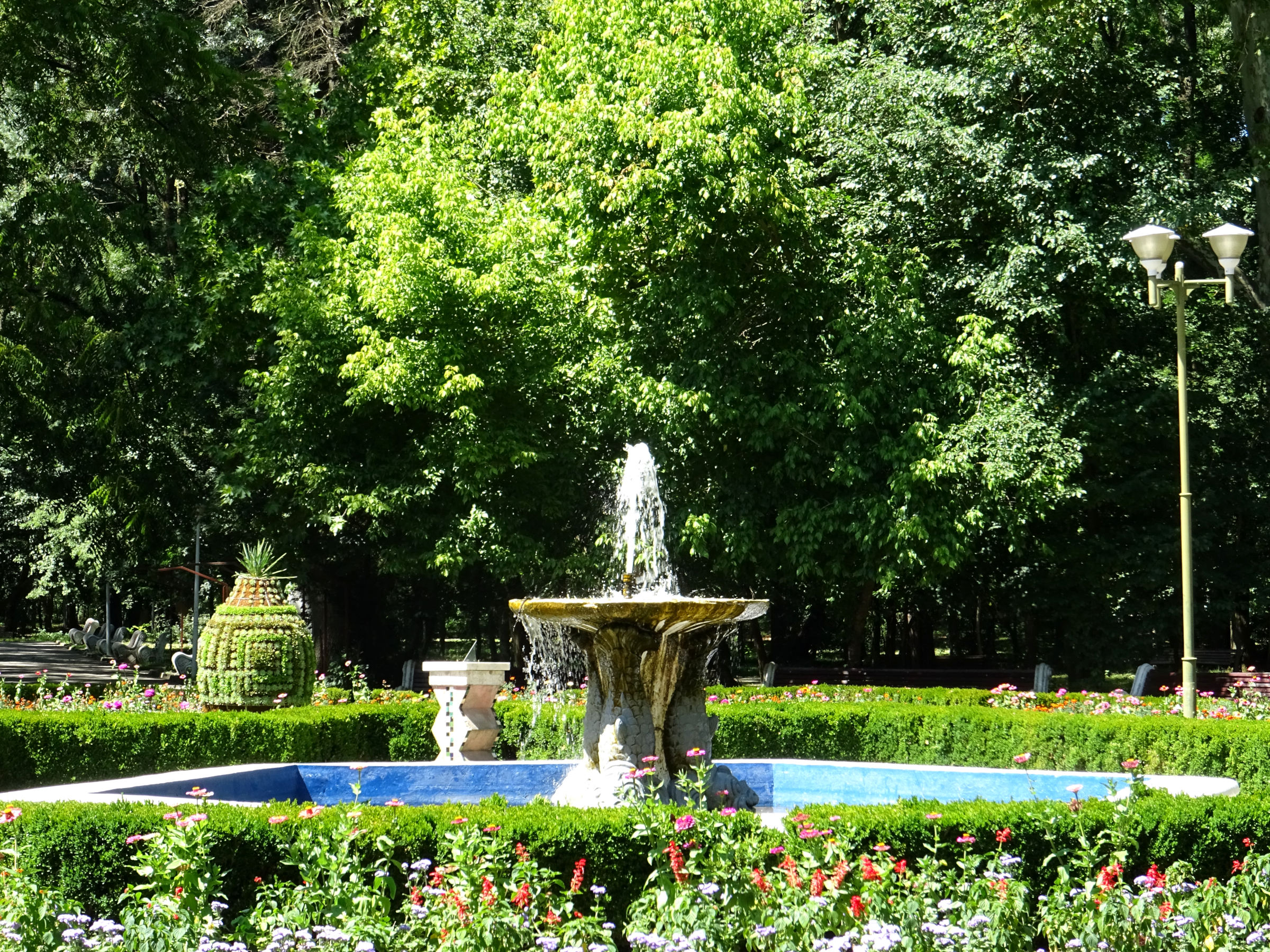
A fountain in the town park

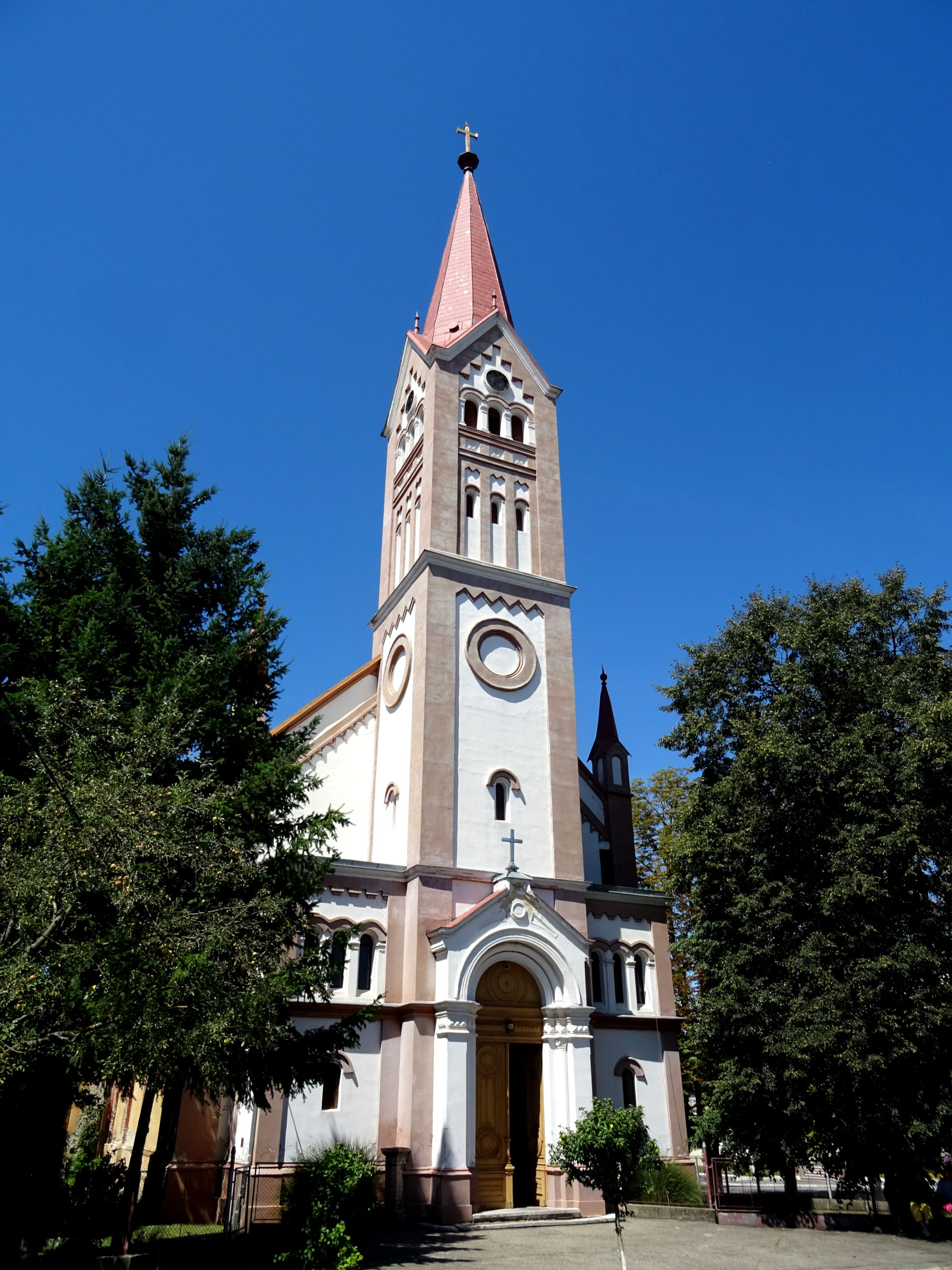
The neo-Gothic Roman Catholic church (1875)

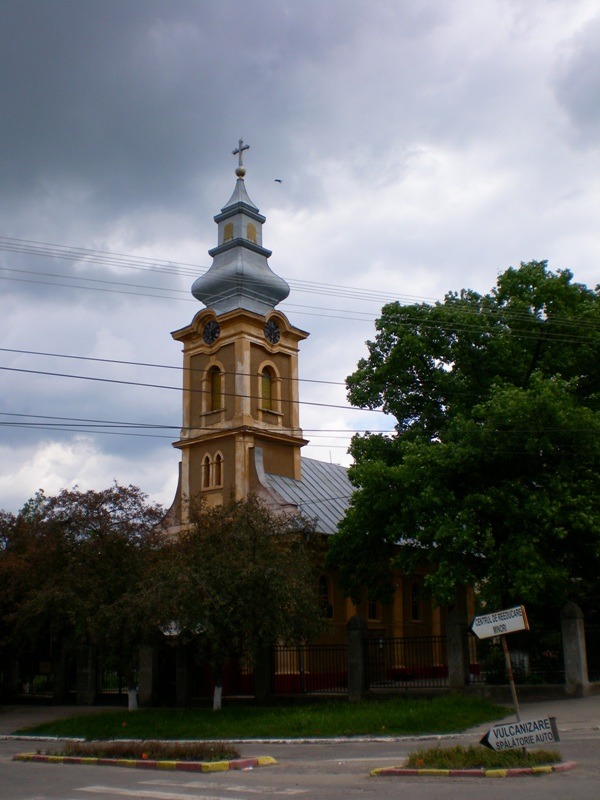
Sts. Peter and Paul Orthodox Church (1833)
