= Timișana =

- Location within Romania

Location
- Country: Romania
- Counties: Timiș County

Physical characteristics
- Mouth: Timiș
  - location: Hitiaș
  - coordinates: 45.7167°N 21.6139°E
- Length: 31 km (19 mi)
- Basin size: 320 km^{2} (120 sq mi)

Basin features
- Progression: Timiș→ Danube→ Black Sea

The Timișana is a left tributary of the river Timiș in Romania. It discharges into the Timiș in Hitiaș. It flows through the southern outskirts of Lugoj and through the villages Boldur, Căpăt, Racovița and Hitiaș. Its length is 31 km (19 mi) and its basin size is 320 km^{2} (120 sq mi).

== Tributaries ==
The following rivers are tributaries to the river Timișana (from source to mouth):

- Left: Fața, Cinca, Dicșan, Cherăstău
