= Vucova =

- Location within Romania

Location
- Country: Romania
- Counties: Timiș County
- Villages: Nițchidorf, Vucova

Physical characteristics
- Mouth: Șurgani
  - location: Chevereșu Mare
  - coordinates: 45.6431°N 21.4929°E
- Length: 11 km (6.8 mi)
- Basin size: 41 km^{2} (16 sq mi)

Basin features
- Progression: Șurgani→ Timiș→ Danube→ Black Sea

The Vucova is a left tributary of the river Șurgani in Romania. It flows into the Șurgani near Chevereșu Mare. Its length is 11 km (6.8 mi) and its basin size is 41 km^{2} (16 sq mi).
