= Cinca =

Cinca can refer to:

- Cinca (Spain), a river in Aragon, Spain
- Cinca (Romania), a river in Timiș County, Romania
