= Fața (river) =

- Location within Romania

Location
- Country: Romania
- Counties: Timiș County
- Villages: Petroasa Mare, Herendești

Physical characteristics
- Mouth: Timișana
  - coordinates: 45.6785°N 21.8282°E
- Length: 16 km (9.9 mi)
- Basin size: 53 km^{2} (20 sq mi)

Basin features
- Progression: Timișana→ Timiș→ Danube→ Black Sea
- Tributaries
  - left: Topila

The Fața is a left tributary of the river Timișana in Romania. It flows into the Timișana near Boldur, west of Lugoj. Its length is 16 km (9.9 mi) and its basin size is 53 km^{2} (20 sq mi).
