= Alisz Goriupp =

- Born: August 18, 1894; Buziásfürdő, Austria-Hungary (now Buziaș, Romania)
- Died: February 4, 1979 (aged 84); Budapest, Hungary
- Other name: Alice Goriupp
- Education: Babeș-Bolyai University; University of Vienna
- Occupation: Librarian

Alisz Goriupp (also known as Alice Goriupp, 18 August 1894 in Buziásfürdő – 4 February 1979 in Budapest) was a Hungarian librarian, media historian and bibliographer. She published several papers on bibliography and other aspects of library science.

== Career ==
In 1916, with a thesis on the work of philologist Gábor Döbrentei, Goriupp earned her doctorate at the Franz Joseph University in Kolozsvár, Austria-Hungary. (Following the Union of Transylvania with Romania, the city was known as Cluj, and subsequently as Cluj-Napoca.)

In 1917 Goriupp obtained a diploma to teach Hungarian and German, having attended the universities of Vienna and Leipzig on a partial scholarship. Afterwards she continued her studies at the University of Vienna.

In 1917-18 she taught German language at her alma mater. In 1918 she began as a trainee at the National Széchényi Library (Országos Széchényi Könyvtár) in Budapest and in 1922 became an assistant library warden. After World War I the newspaper library was in poor condition, so she compiled newspaper cataloguing rules in 1923. She directed the furnishing of a newly built warehouse in 1926. In 1928-29 she travelled to Austria for a year of further study abroad, and again in 1935 to Germany.

Having studied Germany's new national library cataloging system introduced in Berlin, Göttingen, Frankfurt and Darmstadt, she established a new cataloguing system at the National Széchényi Library in 1936. The reform introduced the Universal Decimal Classification and solved the problem of creating multiple catalogues indexed by author, title, subject, etc.

In 1944 she became the national library's collections manager, her concern focused primarily on the safety of the collection during wartime. In 1945 and 1946 she was instrumental in the postwar restoration and reorganization.

In 1946 she founded the National Bibliography of Hungary (Magyar Nemzeti Bibliográfia); she remained its editor until 1954. From 1948 till 1953 she was Faculty Librarian at Eötvös Loránd University and instructed cataloguing and bibliography editing classes.

== Works ==
- 1916: Döbrentei Gábor nyelvújítása ("Neologisms of Gábor Döbrentei", PhD thesis), Linguistics Working Papers, Budapest, 56 pp.
- 1927: Les récentes études bibliographiques hongroises ("Recent Hungarian bibliographical studies"). Champion, Paris, 9 pp.
- 1934: A Magyar Nemzeti Múzeum Hírlaposztálya fennállásának első fél évszázadában, 1884-1934 (Hungarian National Museum, its first half-century of existence), Széchenyi Library, Budapest, 23 pp.
- 1944: A kormányzat sajtópolitikája és a magyar hírlapok a 18. század fordulóján ("Government and media policy: Hungarian newspapers of the 18th century"), Budapest.
- 1951: Katalogizálás ("Cataloguing"), Faculty of Arts, Budapest, 14 pp.
- 1951: Bibliográfiák és bibliográfiák szerkesztése ("Making references and bibliographies of bibliographies"). National Agricultural Library and Documentation Centre (OMgK), Budapest.
- 1951: Bibliográfiai ismeretek 4. éves könyvtártudományos hallgatók részére ("Bibliographic knowledge, fourth traditional annual book for students"). Tankönyvkiadó Jegyzetsoksz, Budapest, 31 pp.
- 1954 Házi soksz ("Homemade diversity", lecture of 17 December 1953). National Széchényi Library, Budapest, 9 pp.
- 1968: Irodalomtudományi Olvasó, II ("Literary Reading, II") Alphabetical index of volumes 1–4, 910 pp.
- 1978: Komjáthy Miklósné-Pajkossy György: Ötven év a nemzeti könyvtárban, katalógus és bibliográfia vonzásában ("Miklósne Komjáthy – György Pajkossy: Fifty years of national library catalogues and bibliography), 9 pp.
