= Cherăstău =

- Location within Romania

Location
- Country: Romania
- Counties: Timiș County

Physical characteristics
- Mouth: Timișana
  - location: Sinersig
  - coordinates: 45.7006°N 21.6965°E
- Length: 15 km (9.3 mi)
- Basin size: 34 km^{2} (13 sq mi)

Basin features
- Progression: Timișana→ Timiș→ Danube→ Black Sea

The Cherăstău is a left tributary of the river Timișana in Romania. It discharges into the Timișana near Sinersig. Its length is 15 km (9.3 mi) and its basin size is 34 km^{2} (13 sq mi).
