= 19th Engineer Battalion =

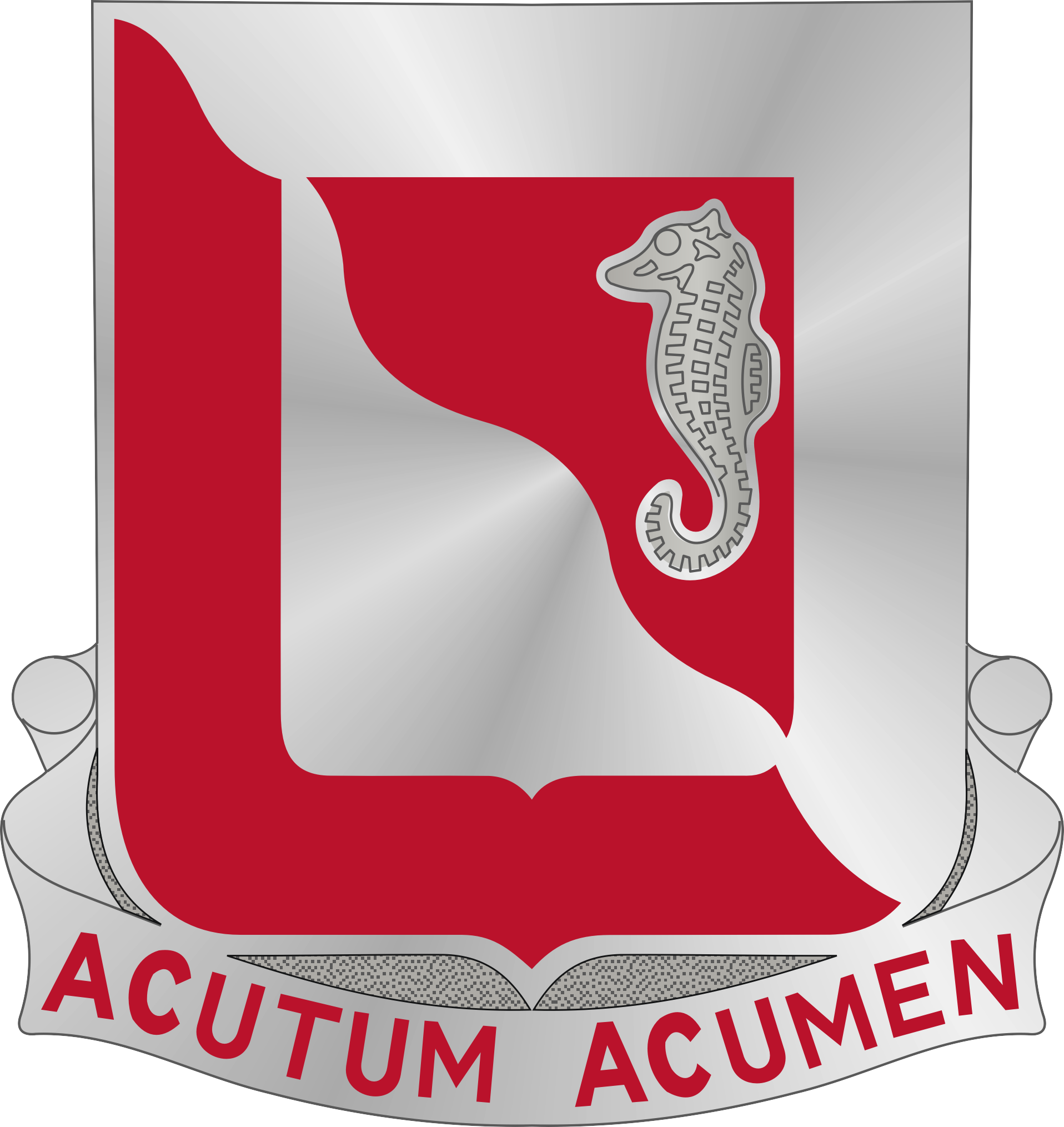
- 19th Eng Bn Distinctive Unit Insignia
- Active: 1933–1945; 1952–1970; 1975–1997; 2005—2026
- Country: United States
- Branch: US Army Corps of Engineers
- Type: Engineer Battalion
- Garrison/HQ: Fort Knox, KY
- Nickname: Seahorse
- Mottos: ACUTUM ACUMEN ('Sharp Ingenuity')

The 19th Engineer Battalion is a United States Army combat engineering unit. This unit provides general engineering support during military operations. It is an Echelon Above Brigade (EAB) engineer unit, composed of five-line companies (15th Construction Company, 42nd Route Clearance Company, 502nd Multi-Role Bridging Company, 541st Sapper Company, 887th Engineer Support Company), one support company (Forward Support Company), one headquarters company (Headquarters and Headquarters Company), and one firefighting detachment (550th Fire Fighter Detachment). As of October 16, 2005, it is stationed at Fort Knox under the 20th Engineer Brigade, XVIII Airborne Corps. The 19th Engineer Battalion O/O deploys engineer forces to provide mission command and general engineer support to decisive action in support of Expeditionary, Army, Joint, or Combined Military Operations world-wide. Activated originally in 1917, the unit provides general engineering, bridging, and route clearance support. It is scheduled to case its colors and deactivate in October 2026.

== Unit Insignia ==
SHIELD: The shield of the coat of arms is used to indicate the descent of the 19th Engineer Battalion from the 3rd Battalion of the 36th Engineer Regiment.

COLORS: The colors red and white are the traditional engineer colors. The wavy partition line and the Seahorse symbolize participation in Marine Transportation and Amphibious Landings by the 36th Engineer Regiment.

MOTTO: ACUTUS ACUMEN (1952–1976)

ACUTUM ACUMEN (1976–Present)

Translation: "SHARP INGENUITY"

== Unit history ==
=== World War II ===
The parent unit of the 19th Engineer Battalion was constituted on October 1, 1933, in the Regular Army as the 36th Engineer Regiment. The 19th Engineer Battalion originated as the 3rd Battalion of the 36th Engineer Combat Regiment. The regiment was activated at Plattsburg Barracks in June 1941. The Regiment was trained for amphibious and support operation, earning the unit its distinctive seahorse.

During World War II, the battalion conducted five amphibious landings while accompanying allied armies through Africa, Italy, France, Germany, and Austria. 3rd Battalion deployed to the North Africa Campaign in 1942, where it conducted its first contested amphibious landing as a part of Operation Torch. The unit would move with and support allied forces east through North Africa during the Tunisia Campaign.

After pushing Axis forces out of North Africa, the battalion participated in the Battle of Sicily, its second amphibious landing. It would push across the island with the 7th Army, eventually forcing German and Italian forces off Sicily. The unit followed across the Mediterranean, taking part in its third amphibious assault at Naples-Foggia, followed by its fourth in support of Operation Shingle near Anzio. For fifty days, the battalion was part of the 7 miles (11 kilometers) Brigade front, earning the distinction as "The Little Seahorse Division" by the German Army.

In 1944, the 3rd Battalion participated in the invasion of southern France, code-named Operation Dragoon, conducting what would be its fifth and final amphibious assault of the war. It would continue to support Allied forces through three subsequent campaigns: the Rhineland Campaign, the Ardennes-Alsace Campaign, and the Central Europe Campaign.

On February 15, 1945, the unit was re-designated the 36th Engineer Combat Group, with the 3rd Battalion being re-designated the 2828th Combat Engineer Battalion at Fort Lewis. The battalion had suffered 902 combat casualties, including 44 killed in action. For their gallantry and service, the battalion was awarded 10 campaign streamers from World War II. Soldiers in the battalion earned seven Silver Stars and 13 Bronze Stars.

=== Cold War ===
==== Stateside ====
On April 29, 1947, the 2828th Engineer Battalion was re-designated the 19th Engineer Combat Battalion and activated at Fort Meade, MD on July 9, 1952. During this time it focused mainly on training, local construction, and domestic relief missions on the East Coast of the United States. In October 1954, it responded to the destruction caused by Hurricane Hazel, helping to clear and rebuild the area around Cambridge and Wingate, Maryland. In August 1955, the 19th assisted the citizens of northern Pennsylvania after Hurricane Diane caused massive flooding in the region. In the winter of 1958, the battalion returned to Maryland to assist with a snow emergency in Baltimore. Finally, they travelled to French Creek in Pennsylvania where they conducted explosive clearing of ice floes in two gorges to prevent flooding.

==== Vietnam War ====
In 1965, the battalion deployed to Vietnam in an amphibious landing on the beaches of Qui Nhon. Its primary mission was to upgrade highway QL-1 from a dirt trail to an all-weather road connecting Qui Nhon and Bong Son. The first phase of this project consisted of the construction of seven Bailey Bridges, decking three existing railroad bridges, and building six timber trestle bridges. During this time, the battalion completed construction projects in support of the Republic of Korea Tiger Division, the 4th Cavalry, the Americal Division, the 4th Infantry Division, and the 199th Light Infantry Brigade, to include port and airfield repair, warehouses, fuel and ammo depots, and pipelines. In the end, the 19th improved and upgraded more than 70 kilometers of QL-1, constructing 11 Bailey Bridges and 34 timber pile bridges, through near-daily enemy contact. At various times in I Corps / II Corps the battalion companies were located at LZ North English, LZ Lowboy, LZ Thunder, LZ Debbie, and LZ Max. The unit returned to Fort Lewis, on October 14, 1970, having suffered more than 505 casualties including 105 killed in action.

=== Operation Desert Shield/Desert Storm ===
The battalion deployed to Saudi Arabia in early 1991 in support of the 1st Armored Division, during which time they constructed two crossing routes over the Trans-Arabian pipeline. With the beginning of the invasion of Iraq on February 24, B and C Companies pushed 200 lanes through the berms along the Iraq/Saudi Arabia border. As the 1st Armored Division pushed into Iraq, the battalion built 220 km of road and constructed FARPs for 4th Aviation Brigade's AH-64 Apache helicopters. They also provided recovery support for the 1st Armored Division as their vehicles became stuck in the wet sand of the region. All told, the 19ths built or maintained more than 475 km of roads, 15 helipads, four pipeline crossings, three prisoner holding areas, and 241 points of entry into Iraq.

=== Global War on Terror ===
==== Operation Iraqi Freedom ====
On October 16, 2005, the 19th Engineer Battalion was reactivated at Fort Knox, KY, as the Army's first modular Engineer Battalion, allowing each company to deploy individually in support of US operations. In August 2006, the Headquarters and Headquarters Company, Forward Support Company, 15th Engineer Company, and 72d Survey and Design Detachment deployed to Iraq, followed in October by the 60th Engineer Company. The battalion was assigned the mission of assured mobility, partnering with Iraqi Army Engineer Units to provide General Engineering (GE) support within Task Force Lightning's (25th Infantry Division) Area of Operations (AO). It repaired 2664 road craters and 40 destroyed culverts throughout its 15-month deployment, returning to Fort Knox in November 2007. During this deployment, the unit lost its only Soldier during the Global War on Terror, 1LT Christopher Rutherford of the Forward Support Group, who died in an IED strike in July 2007.

502nd Multi-role Bridging Company (MRBC) deployed to Iraq in support of the Iraqi offensive into Mosul. This deployment was both a training mission and an operational mission. The Soldiers worked with an Iraqi bridge regiment in preparing and emplacing a 230-meter Improved Ribbon Bridge across the Tigris River. They also assisted in the repair of a bridge across the Zab River.

==== Operation Enduring Freedom ====
In December 2006, the 76th Engineer Company deployed to Afghanistan in support of a brigade expansion. With the Afghan Theater expanding to include two Brigade Combat Teams (BCTs), life support capabilities needed to be expanded to accommodate the increased troop presence. As such, half of the company began construction to expand Bagram Airfield before moving to FOB Fenty in February 2007 to rapidly expand housing and infrastructure. The other half of the company was tasked with the same mission at FOB Salerno before the company reconsolidated at FOB Fenty in June 2007.

When 173d Airborne Brigade Combat Team took over the battlespace, 76th continued their work, constructing 185 B-huts, four SEA-huts, and six brick-and-mortar barracks across 14 FOBs. The company was then tasked with the winterization of the theater, constructing or upgrading infrastructure at 16 FOBs simultaneously. The company returned to Fort Knox in March 2008.

On April 28, 2009, the battalion returned to Afghanistan with 15th Engineer Company, 60th Engineer Company, 76th Engineer Company, and eventually 502d Multi-role Bridge Company, setting up its battalion command post at Kandahar Air Field. With Kandahar as the main hub, the battalion pushed companies to FOBs Wolverine, Frontenac, and Spin Buldak, respectively. Though deployed independently of each other, the three engineer companies had similar missions: expanding life support areas and improving FOB security and force protection measures throughout their AOs. These improvements included helipads, taxiways, UAV landing strips, berms, entry control points, and ammunition holding areas among other construction projects. In total, the battalion completed more than $23 million worth of work while deployed.

In August 2009, 502 MRBC joined the battalion in Afghanistan to conduct fixed and float bridging operations throughout Afghanistan. Most of the company, including the headquarters, was stationed at Camp Leatherneck to support operations in the Helmand river valley, while one platoon remained at Kandahar. These elements provided bridge site reconnaissance and support to their respective AOs. Sites included the Saracha Bridge along Highway 1, the Regak Bridge in Uruzgan Province, and the construction of a Mabey Johnson Bridge at the Andar Bridge site. In April 2010, the 19th Engineer Battalion began its return to Fort Knox.

In Nov 2013, 19th Engineer Battalion, along with 450 Soldiers, deployed to Kuwait on their fourth deployment since their reactivation at Fort Knox under the command of LTC John Lloyd. During the deployment, the unit was responsible for road construction, infrastructure improvements, and a variety of facility upgrades, including projects in Tajikistan. The unit redeployed to Kentucky in August 2014.

In Mar 2016, 42nd Clearance Company deployed to Afghanistan, less than three years after joining 19th Engineer Battalion at Fort Knox. Captain Jason Schwartz took the company to Afghanistan where they conducted route clearance operations and provided security to multiple bases across Afghanistan, while performing engineer and construction tasks. They deployed again between Oct 2018 and July 2019 under CPT Aaron Beatty, the battalion's last deployment as a part of the Global War on Terror. During this deployment, 42nd conducted route clearance missions in support of Operation Freedom's Sentinel in southern Afghanistan. The unit identified and cleared more than 400 IED's, 8 rocket sites, and conducted more than 200 Quick Reaction Force Missions.

=== Stateside missions ===
==== Hurricane Sandy ====
Within 96 hours of Hurricane Sandy's destruction of the New York Metropolitan Area, the battalion deployed in support of United States Army Corps of Engineers recovery operations. The battalion led an unwatering team consisting of the Army's 86th Dive Detachment, 76th Engineer Company, the Marine's 8th Engineer Support Battalion, and others. The team removed trash and debris, conducted structural assessments, and pumped out large municipal buildings and areas.

==== Operation Faithful Patriot ====
In 2018, Soldiers from 19th Engineer Battalion, to include 541st SAPPER Company, 15th Engineer Construction Company, and 887th Engineer Support Company were deployed to the US-Mexico border in support of the Department of Homeland Security and U.S. Customs and Border Protection. During this deployment, the unit was largely tasked with emplacing concertina wire barricades along the border at Hidalgo and improving roads on Base Camp Donna in Donna, TX.

=== Named exercises ===
==== Atlantic Resolve ====
In February 2021, 550th Fire Fighting Detachment deployed to Novo Selo Training Area, Bulgaria to provide Fire Fighting Support to the Black Seas Region.

==== DEFENDER-Europe 21 ====
In May 2021, 541st SAPPER Company deployed to Novo Selo Training Area, Bulgaria to take part in the annual multi-national NATO training exercise DEFENDER-Europe. While at DEFENDER-Europe 21, 541st worked hand-in-hand with Bulgarian and American units to execute a complex training scenario focusing on counter-mobility operations. They returned from this operation in June 2021. DEFENDER-Europe is the premiere NATO training operation, integrating more than 28,000 Soldiers from more than 26 nations to respond to crisis should the need arise.

==== Resolute Castle 21 ====
In July 2021, 887 Engineer Support Company, based out of Fort Campbell, Kentucky, deployed to Cincu, Romania in support of US Army Europe and Africa's (USAREUR-AF) Resolute Castle 21 mission. Resolute Castle is a multinational training exercise that traditionally has been supported by US Army Reserve and National Guard Engineer Units, as well as NATO Engineers, for up to six months of the year. RC21 was the seventh iteration. 887 ESC fell under 62nd Engineer Battalion, 36th Engineer Brigade during their rotation to Europe, where they worked on multiple construction products in support of US Allies and partners.

== Lineage ==
- Parent unit constituted October 1, 1933, in the Regular Army as the 36th Engineers
- Activated June 1, 1941, at Plattsburg Barracks, NY
- Redesignated August 1, 1942, as the 36th Engineer Combat Regiment
- Regiment broken up February 15, 1945, and its elements reorganized and redesignated as follows
  - 3rd Battalion as the 2828th Engineer Combat Battalion
  - Headquarters and Headquarters Service Company as the Headquarters Company, 36th Engineer Combat Group (hereafter separate lineages)
  - 1st Battalion as the 2826th Engineer Combat Battalion (hereafter separate lineages)
  - 2nd Battalion as the 2827th Engineer Combat Battalion (hereafter separate lineages)
- 2828th Engineer Combat Battalion inactivated June 16, 1946 in Germany
- Re-designated April 29, 1947 as the 19th Engineer Combat Battalion
- Activated July 9, 1952 at Fort George G. Meade, MD
- Re-designated June 19, 1953 as the 19th Engineer Battalion
- Inactivated December 15, 1970, at Fort Lewis, WA
- Activated December 21, 1975, at Fort Knox, KY
- Inactivated September 15, 1997 at Fort Knox, KY
- Activated October 16, 2005, at Fort Knox, KY

== Honors ==
=== Campaign participation credit ===
==== World War II ====
- Algeria-French Morocco (with arrowhead)
- Tunisia
- Sicily (with arrowhead)
- Naples-Foggia (with arrowhead)
- Anzio (with arrowhead)
- Rome-Arno
- Southern France (with arrowhead)
- Rhineland
- Ardennes-Alsace
- Central Europe

==== Vietnam ====
- Defense (March 5 – December 24, 1965)
- Counteroffensive (December 25, 1965 – June 30, 1966)
- Counteroffensive, Phase II (July 1, 1966 – May 31, 1967)
- Counteroffensive, Phase III (June 1, 1967 – January 29, 1968)
- Tet Counteroffensive (January 30, 1968 – April 1, 1968)
- Counteroffensive, Phase IV (April 2, 1968 – June 30, 1968)
- Counteroffensive, Phase V (July 1, 1968 – 1 November 1968)
- Counteroffensive, Phase VI (November 2, 1968 – February 22, 1969)
- Tet 69/Counteroffensive (February 23, 1969 – June 8, 1969)
- Summer-Fall 1969 (June 9, 1969 – October 31, 1969)
- Winter-Spring 1970 (November 1, 1969 – April 30, 1970)
- Sanctuary Counteroffensive (May 1, 1970 – June 30, 1970)
- Counteroffensive, Phase VII (July 1, 1970 – June 30, 1971)

==== Southwest Asia ====
- Liberation and Defense of Kuwait
- Cease-Fire

==== War on Terrorism ====
- Afghanistan
  - Consolidation II
  - Consolidation III
- Iraq
  - National Resolution
  - Iraqi Surge

=== Decorations ===
- Valorous Unit Award
  - Streamer embroidered BIHN DIHN AND QUANG NGAI
- Meritorious Unit Commendation
  - Streamer embroidered IRAQ 2006–2007
  - Streamer embroidered AFGHANISTAN 2009–2010
- Republic of Vietnam Civil Action Honor Medal

== Fallen Soldiers (known) ==
=== World War II ===
- LTC Gibbons, Thomas, 1944

=== Vietnam ===
- Pvt Coker, Samuel Earl, A Co, 14 November 1965
- Sp/4 Rowlett, James Wesley, C Co, 27 September 1966
- SFC Bell, Edward James, A Co, 22 April 1967
- Sp/5 Dixon, Cecil F, 137th LE, 4 July 1967
- PSGT Schook, George Washington, B Co, 7 August 1967
- Sp/4 Shubiak, Joseph Edward, A Co, 17 August 1967
- Sp/5 Guerra, Jerry Eugene, A Co, 28 August 1967
- Sp/4 Whorff, John David, 137th LE, 29 August 1967
- Sp/4 Hoots, Douglas James, A Co, 4 September 1967
- Sp/4 Lyon, Frank Elliot, 137th LE, 12 September 1967
- CPL* Menane, Jerry Bruce, 137th LE, 12 September 1967
- Sp/5 Jamack, Charles Anthony, 137th LE, 28 September 1967
- Sp./4 Davis, Samuel M, B Co, 11 October 1967
- Sp/4 Howard, Harvey Rickey, 137th LE, 16 October 1967
- PFC Thompson, Wayland Kent, 137th LE 16 October 1967
- Sp/4 Martin, Wayne Oscar, A Co, 25 October 1967
- Sp/4 Phillips, Michael Gene, HQ, 31 October 1967
- Sp/4 Miller, Robert Earl, 513th DT, 19 November 1967
- PFC McNabb, John Joseph, 73rd CS, 30 November 1967
- Sp/4 Morgan, Joseph Jr, A Co, 18 December 1967
- PV2 Moore, William Charles Jr, A Co, 21 December 1967
- Sp/4 Sebastian, Alton Browning, C Co, 5 February 1968
- Sp/4 Wood, James Lewis, HQ, 15 February 1968
- Sp/4 Zeller, Douglas Lee, C Co, 19 March 1968
- PFC Barker, Robert Lee Jr., C Co, 6 April 1968
- PFC McLaughlin, Michael Paul, C Co, 6 April 196
- Sp/4 Wolpert, Larry Michael, C Co, 6 April 1968*
- CPL* Mattson, Timothy George, C Co, 14 April 1968
- 1LT Paddock, David Allen, B Co, 7 June 1968
- SGT Westrate, Robert Jay, B Co, 7 June 1968
- CPL* Bowman, Clarence Jr., C Co, 18 June 1968
- PFC Murray, Bruce Anderson, 137th LE, 4 July 1968
- Sp/4 Bazan, Isidro Sigfredo, HQ, 5 July 1968
- SGT* Soward, Douglas, HQ, 8 July 1968
- CPL* Gibbins, Robert Wayne, A Co, 9 July 1968
- SGT Barber, Harry Adelbert, A Co, 9 July 1968
- Sp/4 Moore, William Clarence, A Co, 21 July 1968
- PVT Davis, George Nathan, 137th LE, 22 July 1968
- SSG Davis, Hugh Mozell, 137th LE, 22 July 1968
- 1LT Drob, David Michael, 137th LE, 22 July 1968
- CPT Graebner, Siegfried Louis, 137th LE, 22 July 1968
- Sp/4 Kelley, David Bruce, 137th LE, 22 July 1968
- PFC Kiesling, Gerald Dennis, 137th LE, 22 July 1968
- Sp/5 Shafer, Roger Dale, 137th LE, 22 July 1968
- Sp/4 Shrum, William Lawrence, 137th LE, 22 July 1968
- Sp/4 Shultz, Jerry Lee, 137th LE, 22 July 1968
- SSG Tucker, Valentine, 137th LE, 22 July 1968
- PFC Van Dalsem, Marc Gregory, 137th LE, 22 July 1968
- SGT* Willeke, Gary Robert, 137th LE, 22 July 1968
- Sp/4 Gable, Ronald Howard, D Co, 25 July 1968
- PVT Nelson, Archie Lee Jr., D Co, 15 August 1968
- Sp/4 Kennebrew, John C., D Co, 22 August 1968
- PFC Stabler, John Leslie, HQ, 23 August 1968
- PFC Callaghan, Marshall Eugene, D Co, 29 August 1968
- PVT Sheppard, Ronald Eugene, B Co, 20 September 1968
- Sp/4 Johnson, Larry Dean, D Co, 22 September 1968
- PFC Dominquez-Cortez, Eliezer, C Co, 9 October 1968
- Sp/4 Neasham, Robert Dean, 70th, 13 October 1968
- PFC Levier, David James, B Co, 16 October 1968
- Sp/4 Heath, Joseph Emerson, 137th LE, 29 October 1968
- CPL* Wells, John Charles, B Co, 6 November 1968
- 1LT Brierly, James Kenneth, B Co, 12 December 1968
- Sp/4 Major, Kenneth, Carroll Jr., C Co, 15 December 1968
- SFC Troxell, Roger Lee, A Co, 4 January 1969
- 1LT Wojtkiewicz, Jeremy Robert, A Co, 17 January 1969
- PFC McCraney, Clarence, D Co, 19 January 1969
- PFC Haydon, Paul Dearing, D Co, 8 March 1969
- Sp/4 Izzard, Samuel Julius, D Co, 8 March 1969
- SSG Decker, Berton, D Co, 14 March 1969
- Sp/5 Yost, Howard Edgar Jr., B Co, 30 March 1969
- Sp/4 Cunningham, Charles Robert, C Co, 31 March 1969
- PFC Jacques, Felix, D Co, 22 April 1969
- PFC Glynn, John Joseph Jr., A Co, 7 May 1969
- Sp/4 Idlett, James, D Co, 12 May 1969
- Sp/4 Eggenberger, William Gary, D Co, 13 May 1969
- Sp/4 Fenner, Mark William, C Co, 24 May 1969
- PVT Fields, Elmer Eugene, C Co, 24 May 1969
- PFC Hargens, David Allen, C Co, 24 May 1969
- Sp/4 Neavor, Gary Arnold, C Co, 24 May 1969
- Sp/4 Turner, Stanley, C Co, 24 May 1969
- PVT Lybrand, Carl Frederick, 137th LE, 24 May 1969
- SFC Iozzia, Salvatore, A Co, 7 June 1969
- PFC Kjellerson, Myron Dale, 73d CS, 10 June 1969
- PFC Rodriquez, Israel, A Co, 19 June 1969
- Sp/4 Lindberg, John David, D Co, 6 July 1969
- CPL* Eidson, Ronald Lee, B Co, 11 July 1969
- PFC Hughes, Charles Wayne, 137th LE, 14 July 1969
- PFC Gomolicke, Leonard Michael, 137th LE, 14 July 1969
- Sp/5 Keith, Jimmy Eugene, 73d CS, 8 August 1969
- Sp/5 Mandeville, Ross Edward, 73d CS, 19 August 1969
- Sp/4 Grecu, Michael John, HQ, 22 August 1969
- PFC Stanley, Frankie, A Co, 26 August 1969
- CPL Sterling, John Charles, 137th LE, 5 September 1969
- PFC Alexander, Elton Harrold, 137th LE, 5 September 1969
- Sp/5 Harper, Clarence Eugene, 572d LE, 29 December 1969
- Sp/4 Lovellette, Gary Vaughn, 572d LE, 29 December 1969
- PFC Davie, Booker T Jr., HQ, 8 February 1970
- PFC Large, Gary Ray, A Co, 11 March 1970
- Sp/5 Brown, Robert Allen, 572d LE, 19 March 1970
- Sp/4 Jones, Milton Joseph, HQ, 9 July 1970
- Sp/5 Riffe, Charles David, 610th CS, 27 July 1970
- Sp/4 Coffey, Steven Lynn, D Co, 29 August 1970
- Sp/4 Deibel, Edward Paul III, C Co, 2 September 1970
- Sp/4 Graham, Albert E Jr., HQ, 25 October 1970
- SGT Kilver, Phillip Henry, HQ, 25 October 1970
- Sp/4 Tunney, Nicholas Randle, B Co, 5 November 1970
- PVT Asquith, William Robert, HQ, 19 November 1970
- Sp/4 Moore, Robert Gene, HQ, 30 November 1970
- Sp/4 Fields, Frederick Lee, D Co, 30 November 1970

=== Operation Desert Storm ===
- SSG Hansen, Steven Mark
- SGT Walrath, Thomas Eugene
- Sp/4 Fowler, John Clinton
- PVT Patterson, Anthony Troy

=== Global War on Terrorism ===
- 1LT Rutherford, Christopher Neil

== Commanders ==
- LTC Larson (1944)
- LTC Gibbons, Thomas (1944) KIA
- LTC Lombard, Joseph (1944–1945)
- LTC Goodbread, Edward M (9 July 1952 – 18 November 1953)
- MAJ Denton, Charles T (19 November 1953 – 12 August 1954)
- LTC McCord, Howard A. (13 August 1954 – )
- LTC Vassalutti, Frank J. (13 July 1957 – )
- LTC Phillips, William J.
- LTC Young, Roger L. (25 October 1959 – 12 August 1960)
- LTC Mewshaw, Charles T. (13 August 1960 – 14 July 1961)
- LTC Regn, Elmer M. (15 July 1961 – 6 April 1962)
- LTC Savio, Wayne L. (7 April 1962 – )
- LTC Jones, Thomas C. (1963)
- LTC Mattews, Amos C (30 June 1965 – 16 July 1966)
- LTC Rhodes, Nolan C. (16 July 1966 – 23 July 1967)
- LTC Remson, Andrew C Jr. (23 July 1967 – 2 March 1968)
- LTC Sutton, James L. (2 March 1968 – 7 September 1968)
- LTC Wisdom, Donald L. (7 September 1968 – 7 February 1969)
- LTC Burns, Gilbert L. (7 February 1969 – 10 July 1969)
- LTC Andrews, Wilson P (11 July 1969 – 15 February 1970)
- LTC Gardner, Morris L (15 February 1970 – 10 June 1970)
- LTC West, Pleasant (10 June 1970 – 4 November 1970)
- LTC Carpenter, Robert (4 November 1970 – 16 December 1970)
- LTC Tritz, Jim (1 May 1976 – late 1977)
- LTC Hardiman, Robert R (late 1977 – May 1979)
- LTC McCollister, Kenneth W (May 1979 – November 1980)
- LTC Lafond, Clovis O. (November 1980 – May 1983)
- LTC Daly, Timothy E. (May 1983 – 10 May 1985)
- LTC Gnace, James (10 May 1985 – )
- LTC Paul, Courtney (October 2005 – 12 February 2008)
- LTC Roscoe, Heath C. (12 February 2008 – 24 June 2010)
- LTC Ray, David G. (24 June 2010 – June 2012)
- LTC Lloyd, Paul C (June 2012 – 5 September 2014)
- LTC Handura, James J (5 September 2014 – 2016)
- LTC Pinchasin, Esther S (2016–2018)
- LTC Morgan, Brad A. (2018 – 24 July 2020)
- LTC Beal, Christopher O. (24 July 2020 – 30 June 2022)
- LTC Bradford, Todd F. (30 June 2022 – 18 June 2024)
- LTC Benz, Derek (18 June 2024 - present)

== Command Sergeants Major ==
- CSM Dixon, Darrell (2008–2010)
- CSM Walter, Christopher (2010–2012)
- CSM Dunbar, Ethan (June 2012 – 5 September 2014)
- CSM Toussaint, Patrickson (5 September 2014 – )
- CSM Latham, Raymond (2018–2019)
- CSM Nicholson, William B. (2019– 23 November 2021)
- CSM Badgett, Jeremy S. (23 November 2021 – 21 August 2024)
- CSM French, Dustin S. (2024– present)
