= Șurgani =

Șurgani Șorcan
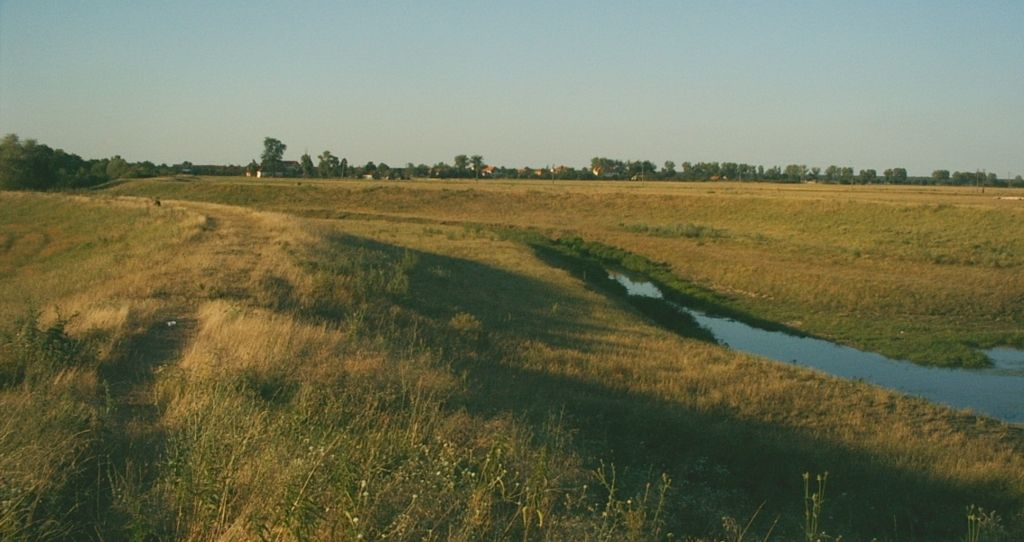
- The Șurgani river upstream of the village of Chevereșu Mare

- Location within Romania

Location
- Country: Romania
- Counties: Timiș County
- Villages: Buziaș, Chevereșu Mare

Physical characteristics
- Source: Dumbrava Forest
- Mouth: Timiș
  - location: Dragșina
  - coordinates: 45.6976°N 21.4016°E
- Length: 31 km (19 mi)
- Basin size: 195 km^{2} (75 sq mi)

Basin features
- Progression: Timiș→ Danube→ Black Sea
- Tributaries
  - left: Silagiu, Făgimac, Vucova
  - right: Vâna

The Șurgani (locally also called Șorcan) is a left tributary of the river Timiș in Romania. It discharges into the Timiș in Dragșina. Its length is 31 km (19 mi) and its basin size is 195 km^{2} (75 sq mi).

== Hydrography ==
The Șurgani originates in Dumbrava Forest, east of the town of Buziaș. It crosses the central part of the Banat plain and, after crossing the village of Chevereșu Mare it joins the Timiș south of the village of Dragșina.

The main tributaries of the Șurgani river are, from source to mouth, the rivers Silagiu, Făgimac and Vucova. The Vâna, at present a tributary of the Șurgani, is a former branch of the Șurgani, whose upstream link to the river has been cut off by the embankment.

== Development ==
There are two storage lakes in the basin of the Șurgani, one on the upper course of the Șurgani (Salcia) and one on the tributary Silagiu.

At the beginning of the 20th century, dykes have been built along the lower reach of the river, from the village of Chevereșu Mare to the confluence with the Timiș River.

== Environmental problems ==
The Șurgani is a vector for the expansion of the indigo bush (Amorpha fructicosa), an invasive plant originary from North America, which was brought to the Buziaș area for decorative purposes. The bush has invaded the banks of the Șurgani River and of the Timiș downstream of the confluence with the Șurgani River, gradually replacing the autochthonous vegetation.
