= Endre Misteth =

Endre Mistéth
- Born: 10 September 1912; Buziásfürdő, Transylvania, Austria-Hungary (today Buziaș, Romania)
- Died: 12 July 2006 (aged 94); Budapest, Hungary
- Education: Technical University of Budapest
- Occupation: Architect
- Buildings: Erzsébet Bridge; Kossuth Bridge

Endre Mistéth (10 September 1912 – 12 July 2006) Hungarian bridge engineer, minister, winner of Szechenyi prize, builder of numerous bridges in Budapest following World War II.

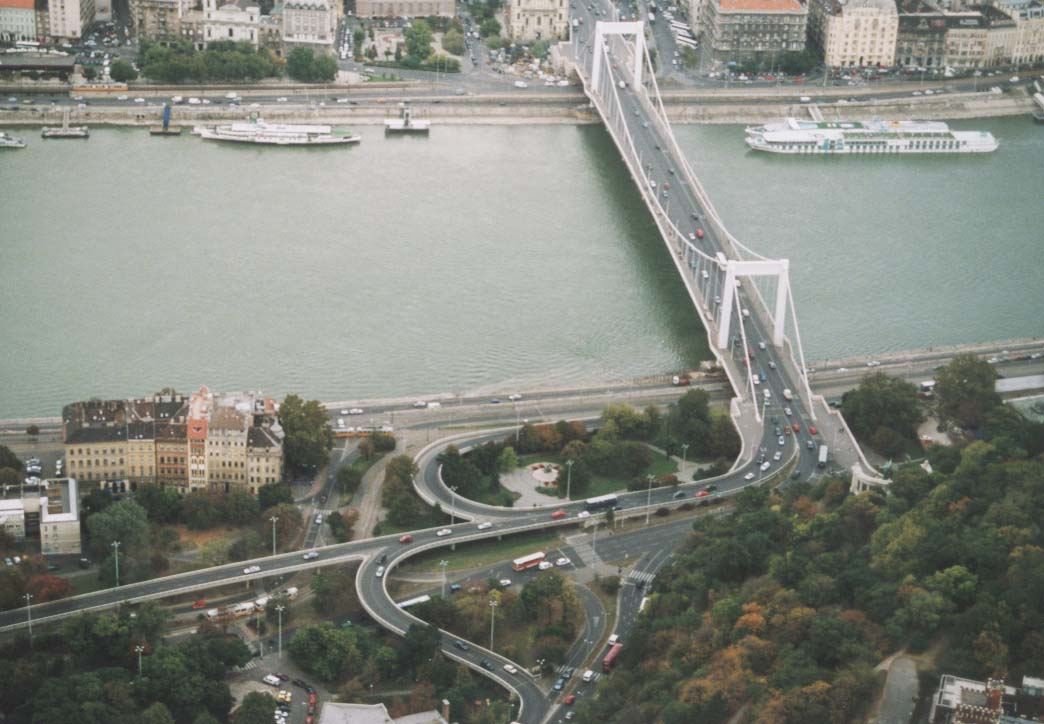
Erzsébet Bridge in Budapest, which Misteth helped design
