= Kristóf Niczky =

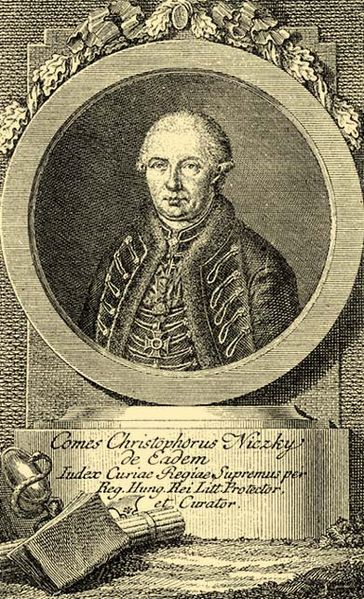
- Born: February 11, 1725; Sümeg
- Died: December 26, 1787 (aged 62); Buda
- Other name: Christophorus Niczky
- Spouse: Katharina Jankovich de Priberd
- Children: Gyorgy Josef Niczky de Niczk

Count Kristóf Niczky de Niczk (February 11, 1725 in Sümeg – December 26, 1787 in Buda) was an influential Habsburg bureaucrat under Maria Theresa and Joseph II, serving as Master of the Treasury from 14 August 1783 to 21 December 1786.

== Biography ==
He rose to the rank of count in 1765. He was Temes County's first leader after 1779.

During Joseph II's rule, he was president of Hungary's Vice-regal Council, the Consilium locumtentiale.

== Legacy ==
Nițchidorf, Romania, was named after count Kristóf Niczky.
