= Chevereșu Mare =

- Commune
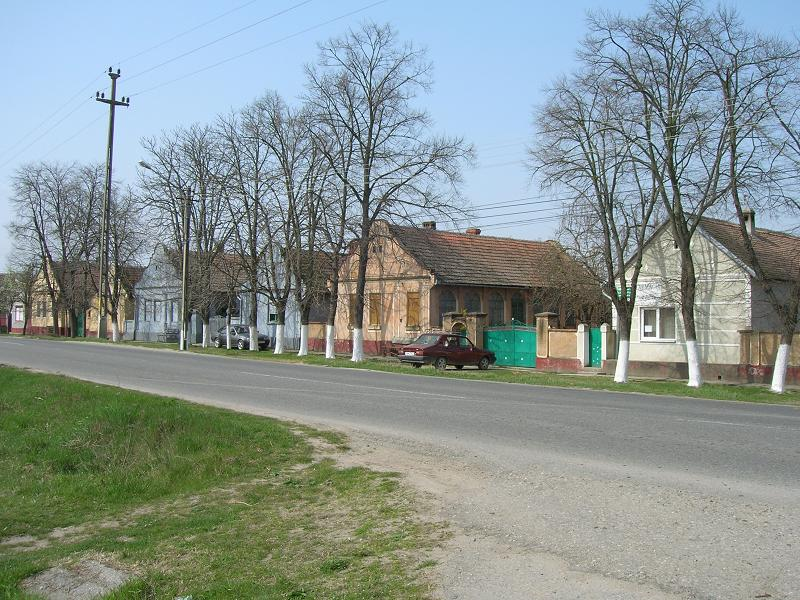
- Baroque facades in Chevereșu Mare

- Coat of arms

- Location in Timiș County

- Location in Romania
- Coordinates: 45°40′N 21°29′E
- Country: Romania
- County: Timiș

Government
  - Mayor (2024–2028): Marcel Muia (PSD)
- Area: 81.17 km^{2} (31.34 sq mi)
- Population (2021-12-01): 2,369
  - Density: 29.19/km^{2} (75.59/sq mi)
- Time zone: UTC+02:00 (EET)
  - Summer (DST): UTC+03:00 (EEST)
- Postal code: 307105–307107
- Vehicle reg.: TM
- Website: www.primariacheveresumare.ro

Chevereșu Mare (Hungarian: Nagykövéres; German: Großkeweresch; Serbian: Велики Кевереш, romanized: Veliki Kevereš; Slovene: Kovači) is a commune in Timiș County, Romania. It is composed of three villages: Chevereșu Mare (commune seat), Dragșina and Vucova.

== Geography ==
Chevereșu Mare is located in the central-southern part of Timiș County, in the place where three plains meet: the hilly plain of Gătaia, the gulf of Lugoj and the low plain of Timiș. It borders the commune of Racovița and the town of Buziaș to the east, the commune of Nițchidorf to the south, the communes of Sacoșu Turcesc and Moșnița Nouă to the west and the commune of Remetea Mare and the town of Recaș to the north.

=== Hydrography ===
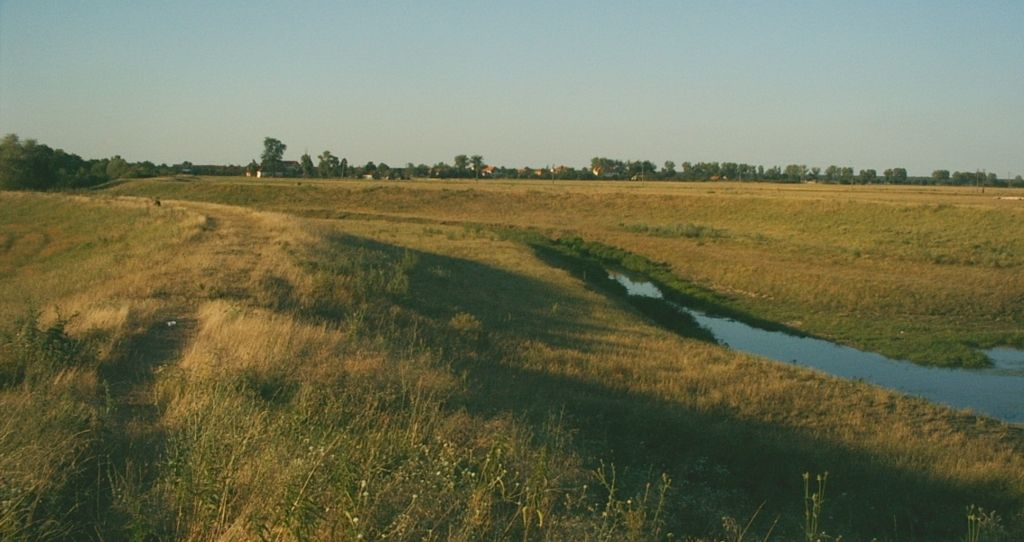
Șurgani upstream of Chevereșu Mare

The Timiș River is the northern border of the commune. Chevereșu Mare is crossed by a small canalized stream called Șurgani (locally Șorcan). It springs northwest of Buziaș, in the Dumbrava Forest, flowing into the Timiș River, on the left side, just upstream from the strand at Albina. A dry arm of Șurgani, Vâna, crosses the Corneanț neighborhood. In the past, Chevereșu Mare also had a lake, Hergheșceu, dried up after the land improvement works of 1969–1970.

== History ==
The first recorded mention of Chevereșu Mare dates from the end of the Turkish occupation of Banat and is made by Marsigli in his writings from 1690, where he mentions the village of Keveris in the district of Ciacova. The village is certainly older and was inhabited by Romanians when, in 1717, the Austrians conquered Banat. In Der Buziascher Bezirk, Helmut Wettel believes that the name is of Slavic origin, "village of blacksmiths" (covaci is a regionalism in Banat and Transylvania for blacksmith). With the establishment of the post office in 1721, Chevereșu Mare became an administrative center for the surrounding localities and even for some more distant ones. Here was the headquarters of an administrative sub-office and a forest district. Until 1808 Chevereșu Mare was a chamber property and a revenue office.

The local tradition speaks of three hamlets that merged, during the reign of Maria Theresa, on the current hearth of the settlement: Corneanț (the nucleus of the future settlement), Bocea (the largest one) and Drila. Corneanț was located where today is the homonymous neighborhood, in the south of the village. Bocea was further north, at the edge of the forest, between Dragșina and Sârbova. The village of Potchia appeared on old Austrian maps until 1750. Today, Bocea is the neighborhood that occupies the northern part of the settlement. The contemporary Regat neighborhood, located in the northwest, was called, until the interwar period, Drila.

== Demographics ==
Ethnic composition (2021)
1. Romanians (62.2%)
2. Roma (15.3%)
3. Hungarians (6.58%)
4. Slovaks (3.41%)
5. Unknown (11.7%)
6. Others (0.82%)
Religious composition (2021)
1. Orthodox (67.5%)
2. Roman Catholics (8.90%)
3. Pentecostals (6.12%)
4. Lutherans (1.35%)
5. Unknown (13.8%)
6. Others (1.54%)
7. Irreligious, atheists and agnostics (0.88%)

Chevereșu Mare had a population of 2,369 inhabitants at the 2021 census, up 4.27% from the 2011 census. Most inhabitants are Romanians (62.22%), larger minorities being represented by Roma (15.32%), Hungarians (6.58%) and Slovaks (3.41%). For 11.65% of the population, ethnicity is unknown. By religion, most inhabitants are Orthodox (67.45%), but there are also minorities of Roman Catholics (8.9%), Pentecostals (6.12%) and Lutherans (1.35%). For 13.76% of the population, religious affiliation is unknown.

Census		Ethnic composition
Year	Population	Romanians	Hungarians	Germans	Roma	Slovaks
1880	3,765	2,826	399	73	–	442
1890	4,098	3,033	456	69	–	516
1900	4,102	2,863	489	96	–	598
1910	4,117	2,782	589	81	–	554
1920	3,699	2,539	522	78	–	–
1930	3,657	2,473	513	58	58	550
1941	3,575	2,308	493	59	–	–
1956	3,069	2,121	442	21	207	271
1966	2,793	2,072	349	12	49	304
1977	2,651	1,901	326	10	139	271
1992	2,029	1,397	203	8	225	178
2002	1,910	1,343	207	3	210	133
2011	2,272	1,388	188	4	439	101
2021	2,369	1,474	156	4	363	81

== Politics and administration ==
The commune of Chevereșu Mare is administered by a mayor and a local council composed of 11 councilors. The mayor, Marcel Muia, from the Social Democratic Party, has been in office since 2000. As from the 2024 local elections, the local council has the following composition by political parties:

Party	Seats	Composition
Social Democratic Party	8	
Alliance for the Union of Romanians	2	
National Liberal Party	1	

== Education and culture ==
The locality has a cultural center and a public library. Several decades ago, Chevereș had a choir and a brass band, following the famous example of the villagers from Chizătău. There was also a group of călușari. A cinema also operated here.

=== Churches ===
The Orthodox church, built in 1801 in the Bocea neighborhood, is dedicated to the Ascension of Jesus. It replaces and older church of twigs that was located in the Corneanț neighborhood, together with the old cemetery, on the greenfield called Plațu Bicii. The Roman Catholic church, located on Drumu Mare (the main street), is dedicated to King Saint Stephen and is a branch of the parish of Bacova; it was built around 1869.

Vucova has a Lutheran church built in 1852 by the Slovaks colonized here in the first half of the 19th century.

=== Schools ===
In the center of the commune there is an eight-grade school, with the language of instruction being Romanian. There is also a kindergarten here. In the other component villages there are only four-grade schools. Confessional education in Romanian is attested in the locality from the 18th century.

== Economy ==
Similar to one or two centuries ago, the primary economic activities of the local population continue to be animal husbandry, cereal cultivation, and wood processing. Chevereșu Mare possesses the largest pasturelands among the surrounding localities. Tracing back to the era of the Temeşvar Eyalet, sheep breeding and maize cultivation have remained the predominant agricultural sectors in the region.

Two entrepreneurs have established woodworking workshops in the village, thereby revitalizing a centuries-old tradition. In recent years, the processing of amorpha twigs (Amorpha fruticosa) has shown a tendency toward development. The economic profile of the settlement is further diversified by the presence of an international freight transport company, a gas station, a polyurethane shoe sole manufacturing workshop, a bakery, approximately six retail shops and bars, as well as several other small-scale entrepreneurial ventures.

== Notable people ==
- Peter Czartan (1539–1724), supercentenarian
- Pavel Rotariu (1840–1919), publicist and lawyer
- Franz Kräuter (1885–1969), teacher and deputy
- Pavel Blidaru (1896–1953), peasant writer, deputy and publicist
