= Gábor Döbrentei =

Hungarian philologist and antiquarian

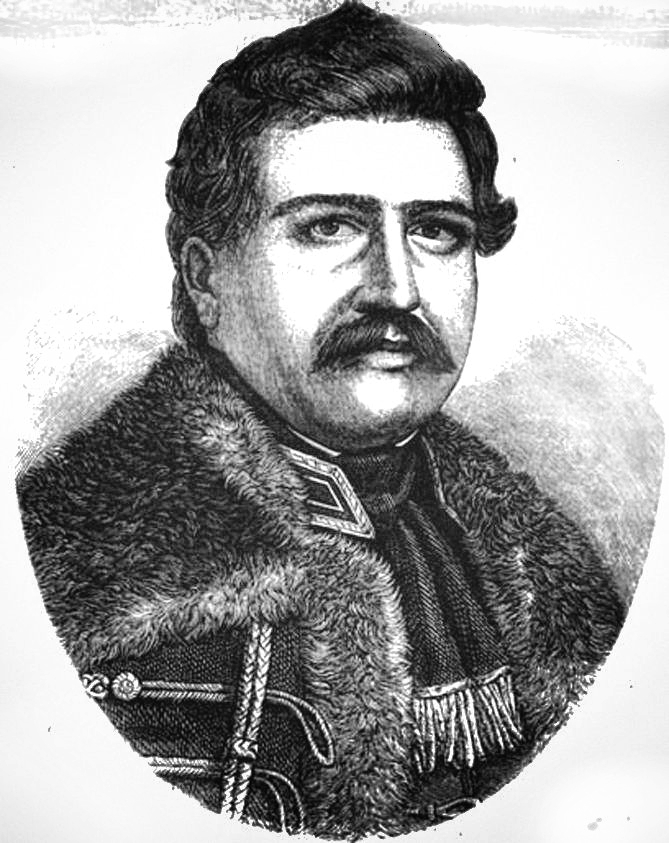
Gábor Döbrentei

Gábor Döbrentei (1 December 1785 – 28 March 1851) was a Hungarian philologist and antiquary.

== Background ==
He was born in a city in the Kingdom of Hungary called Somlószőlős. As the son of itinerant Lutheran preacher Lajos Döbrentey, his early schooling was in Pápa; he remained in grammar school in Sopron on the Austrian border until 1805. For most of his life he lived in what was then the Austrian Empire.

He completed his studies at the universities of Wittenberg and Leipzig, and was afterwards engaged as a tutor in Transylvania. In 1814 he originated and edited the Erdélyi Muzeum, which, notwithstanding its important influence on the development of Hungarian language and literature, soon failed for want of support. In 1820, Döbrentei settled at Pest, and there he spent the rest of his life.

He held various official posts, but continued zealously to pursue the studies for which he had early shown a strong preference. His great work is the Ancient Monuments of the Magyar Language (Régi Magyar Nyelvemlékek), the editing of which was entrusted to him by the Hungarian Academy. The first volume was published in 1838, and the fifth was in preparation at the time of his death.

Döbrentei was one of the twenty-two scholars appointed in 1825 to plan and organize, under the presidency of Count Teleki, the Hungarian Academy. In addition to his great work he wrote many valuable papers on historical and philological subjects, and many biographical notices of eminent Hungarians. These appeared in the Hungarian translation of Brockhaus's Conversations-Lexikon.

He translated into Hungarian Macbeth and other plays of Shakespeare, Sterne's Letters from Yorick to Eliza (1828), several of Schiller's tragedies, and Molière's A vare, and wrote several original poems.

Döbrentei does not appear to have taken any part in the revolutionary movement of 1848. He died at his country house, near Pest.
