= Cinca (Romania) =

- Location within Romania

Location
- Country: Romania
- Counties: Timiș County
- Villages: Visag, Hodoș

Physical characteristics
- Mouth: Timișana
  - location: Upstream of Boldur
  - coordinates: 45.6890°N 21.8077°E
- Length: 22 km (14 mi)
- Basin size: 90 km^{2} (35 sq mi)

Basin features
- Progression: Timișana→ Timiș→ Danube→ Black Sea

The Cinca is a left tributary of the river Timișana in Romania. It flows into the Timișana near Boldur. Its length is 22 km (14 mi) and its basin size is 90 km^{2} (35 sq mi).
