= Racovița, Timiș =

Racovița
- Commune
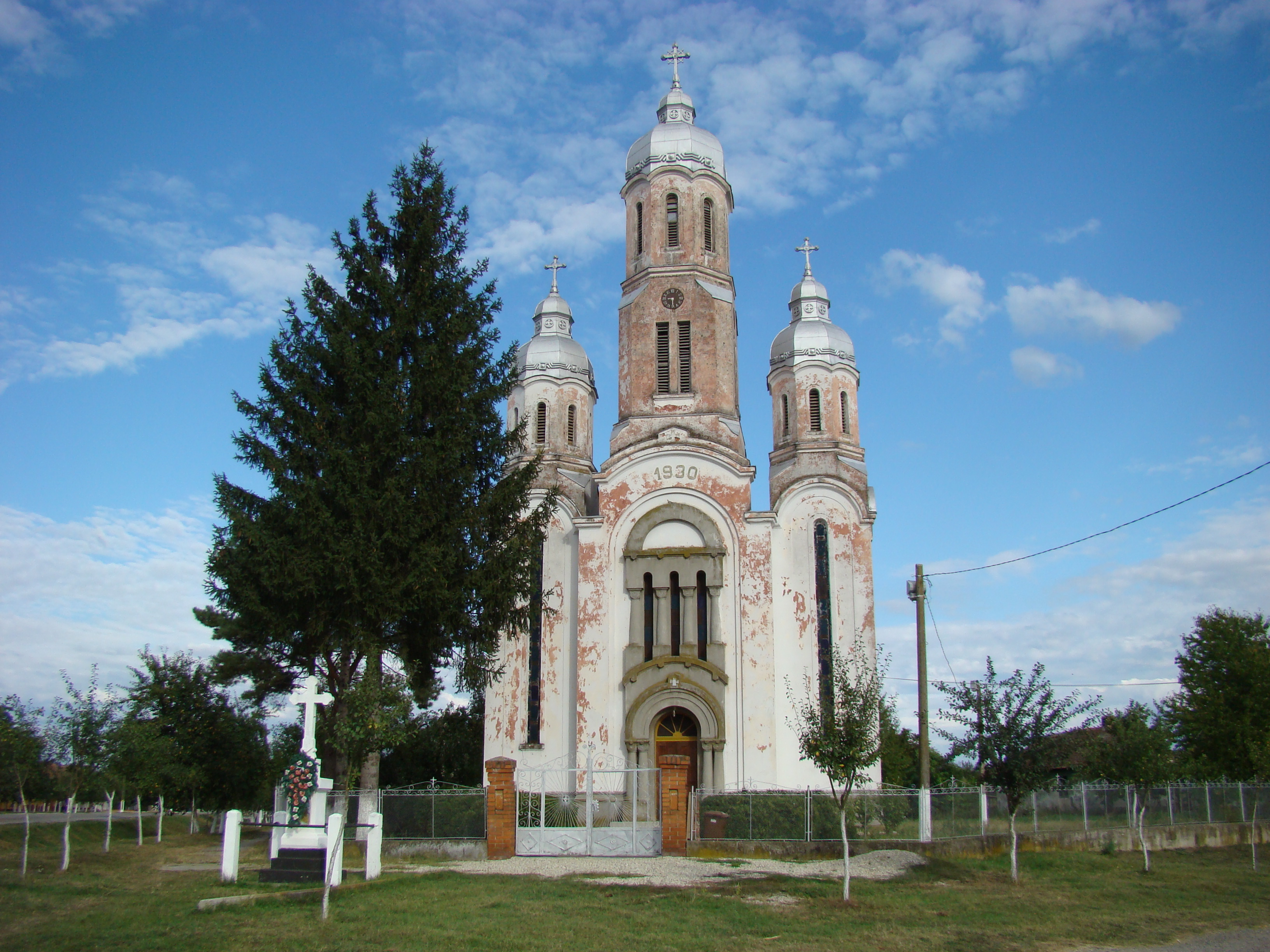
- The Greek Catholic church in Racovița

- Location in Timiș County

- Location in Romania
- Coordinates: 45.6983°N 21.6358°E
- Country: Romania
- County: Timiș

Government
  - Mayor (2024–): Alexandru-Valentin Catrinoi (PNL)
- Area: 72.35 km^{2} (27.93 sq mi)
- Population (2021-12-01): 2,924
  - Density: 40.41/km^{2} (104.7/sq mi)
- Time zone: UTC+02:00 (EET)
  - Summer (DST): UTC+03:00 (EEST)
- Postal code: 307330–307336
- Vehicle reg.: TM
- Website: www.primariaracovita.ro

Racovița (Hungarian: Rakovica; German: Rikaß or Rakowitz; Serbian: Раковица, romanized: Rakovica) is a commune in Timiș County, Romania. It is composed of six villages: Căpăt, Drăgoiești, Ficătar, Hitiaș, Racovița (commune seat) and Sârbova.

== History ==
The first recorded mention of Racovița dates from 1447. In the Middle Ages it was called Rakovicza and belonged to Temesdoboz estates. After the expulsion of the Turks from Banat, it was inhabited by Romanians and became the property of the Aerarium. In the chamber records from 1717 it appears mentioned with 40 houses, belonging to Nagykövéres estates.

== Demographics ==
Ethnic composition (2021)
1. Romanians (90.8%)
2. Roma (2.39%)
3. Unknown (5.54%)
4. Others (1.24%)
Religious composition (2021)
1. Orthodox (88.6%)
2. Pentecostals (2.59%)
3. Roman Catholics (1.02%)
4. Unknown (6.08%)
5. Others (1.50%)
6. Irreligious, atheists and agnostics (0.17%)

Racovița had a population of 2,924 inhabitants at the 2021 census, down 7.71% from the 2011 census. Most inhabitants are Romanians (90.83%), with a minority of Roma (2.39%). For 5.54% of the population, ethnicity is unknown. By religion, most inhabitants are Orthodox (88.64%), but there are also minorities of Pentecostals (2.59%) and Roman Catholics (1.02%). For 6.08% of the population, religious affiliation is unknown.

Census		Ethnic composition
Year	Population	Romanians	Hungarians	Germans	Roma	Ukrainians
1880	6,636	6,408	91	98	–	–
1890	7,041	6,620	218	133	–	–
1900	7,138	6,647	325	138	–	–
1910	7,051	6,499	372	104	–	–
1920	6,138	5,832	180	76	–	–
1930	6,061	5,741	161	67	60	–
1941	5,791	5,455	171	58	–	–
1956	5,150	4,946	122	26	36	6
1966	4,798	4,678	86	22	–	7
1977	4,491	4,346	50	7	68	15
1992	3,399	3,144	42	9	68	133
2002	3,295	3,150	47	4	25	63
2011	3,168	2,769	31	4	121	105
2021	2,924	2,656	11	–	70	22

== Politics and administration ==
The commune of Racovița is administered by a mayor and a local council composed of 11 councilors. The mayor, Alexandru-Valentin Catrinoi, from the National Liberal Party, has been in office since 2024. As from the 2024 local elections, the local council has the following composition by political parties:

Party	Seats	Composition
National Liberal Party	5	
Social Democratic Party	4	
Save Romania Union–People's Movement Party–Force of the Right	1	
Alliance for the Union of Romanians	1	

== Gallery ==
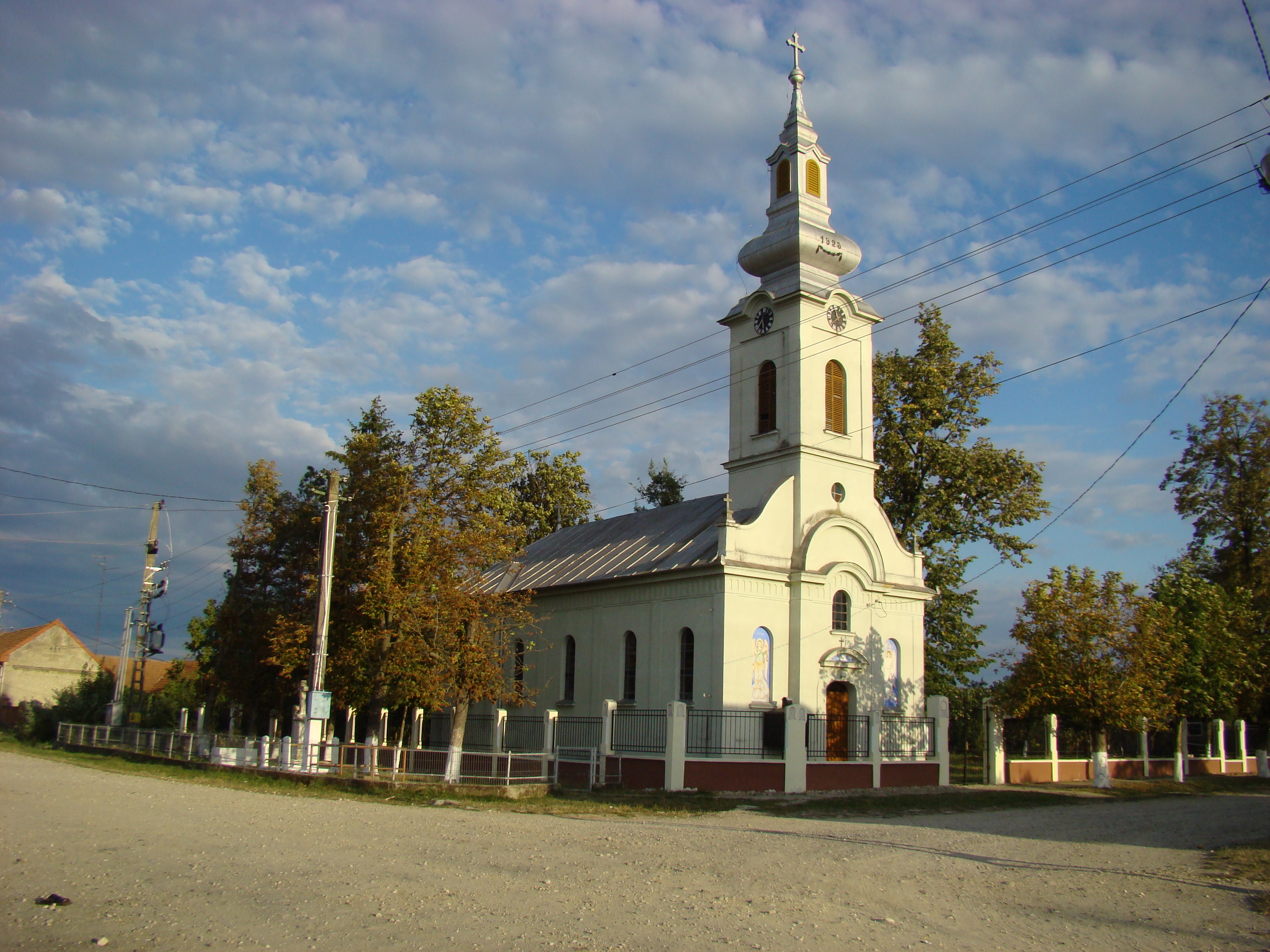
Căpăt Orthodox church

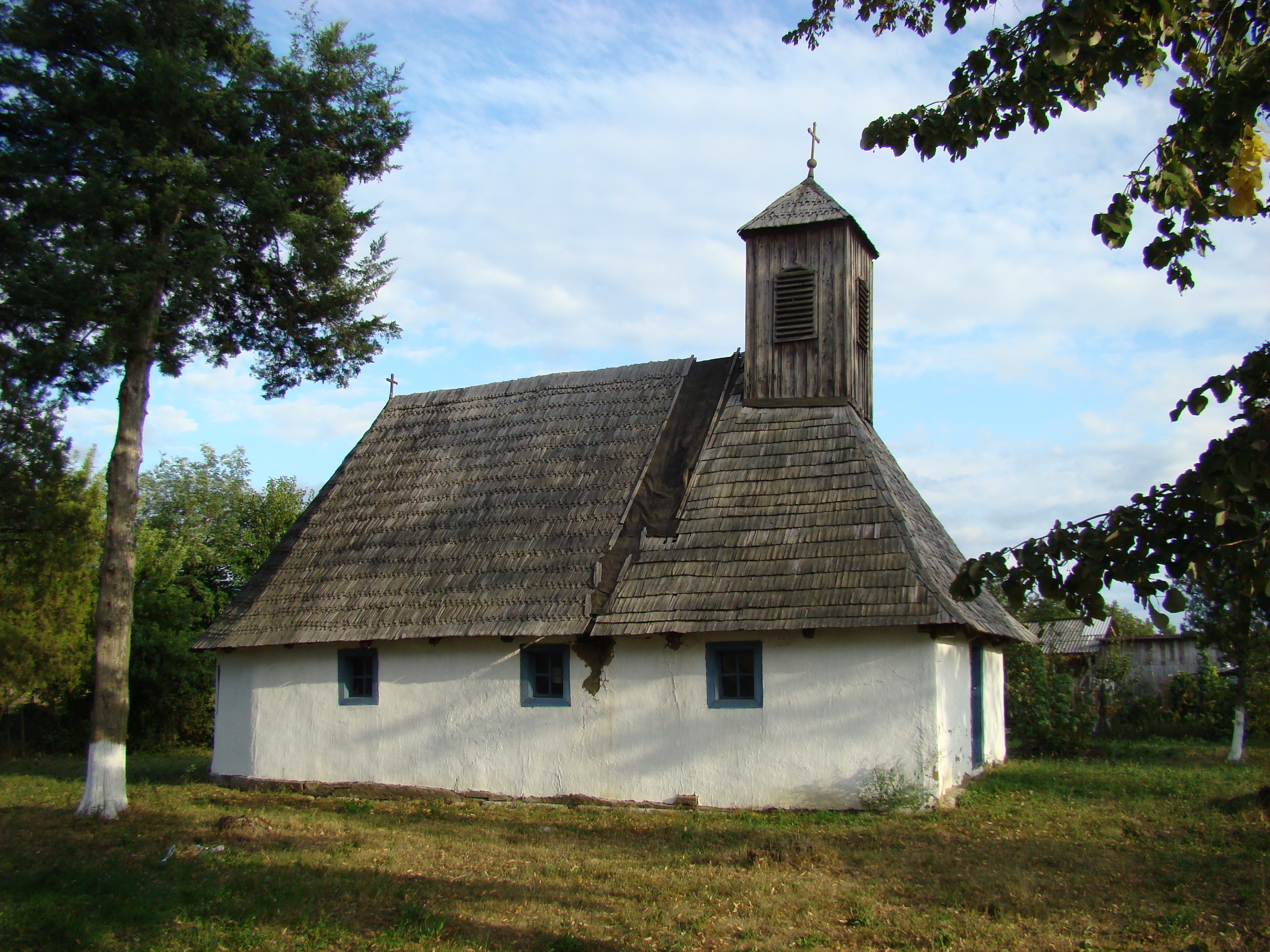
Căpăt wooden church

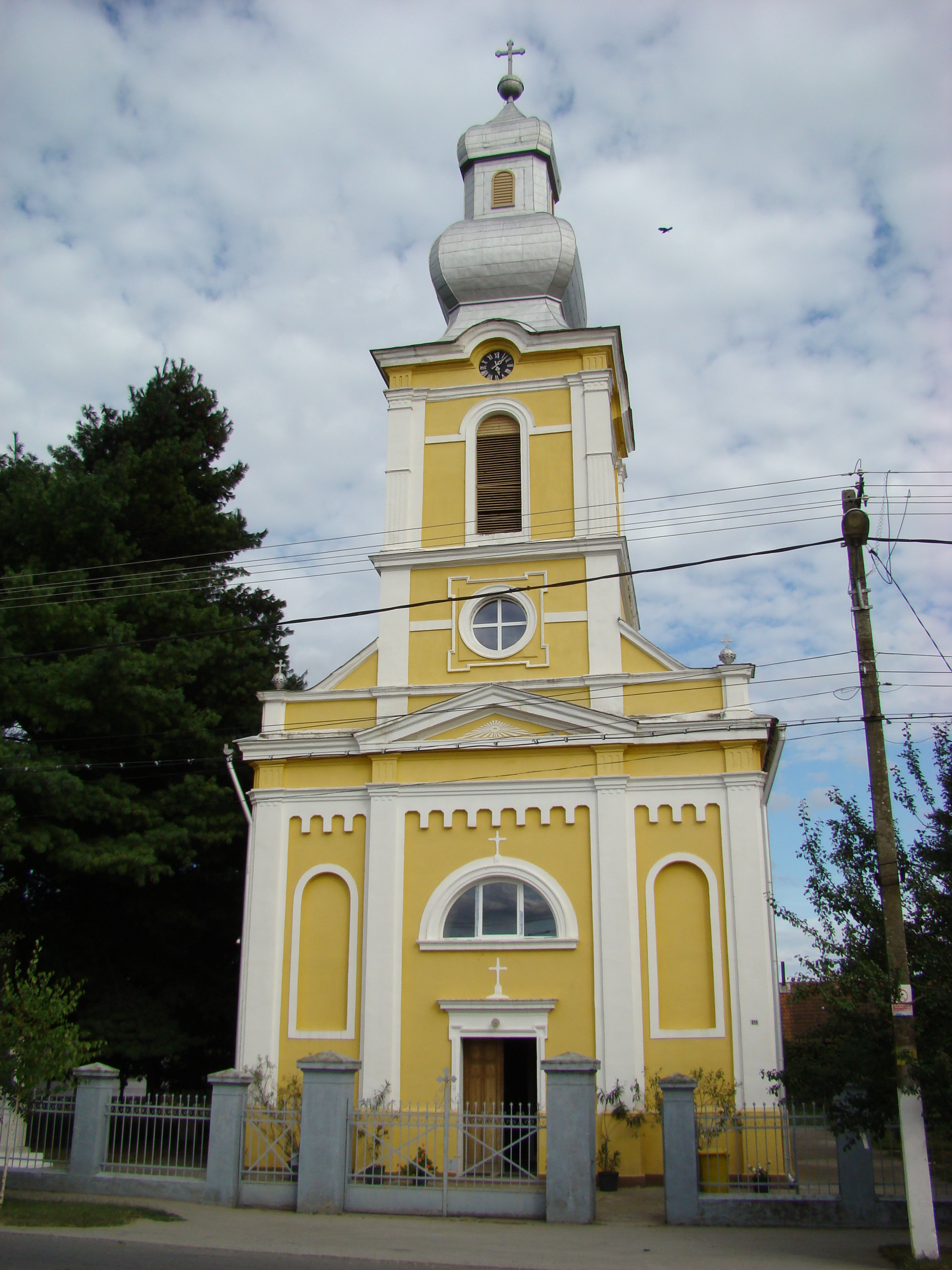
Hitiaș Orthodox church

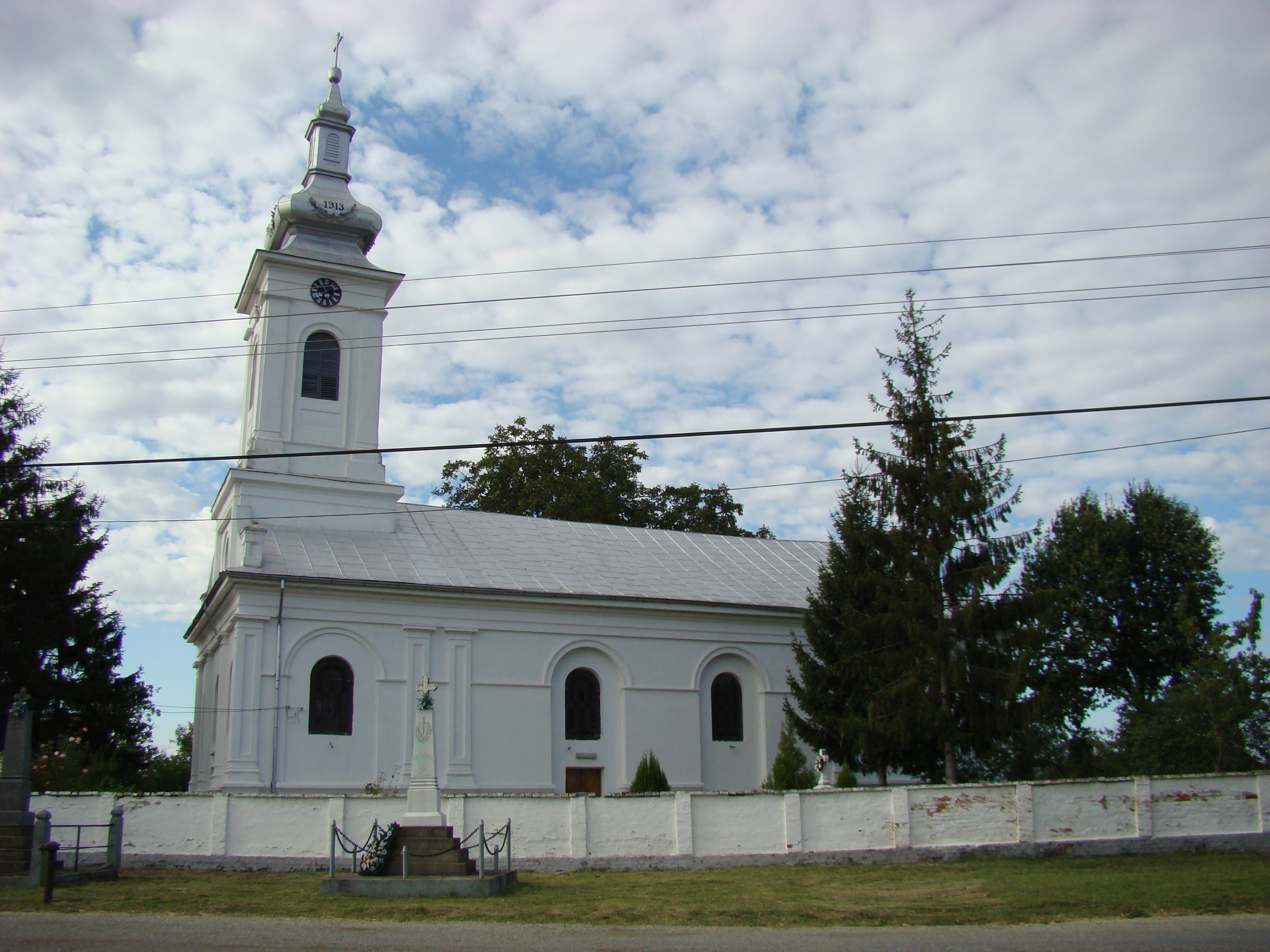
Racovița Orthodox church
