= Nițchidorf =

- Commune
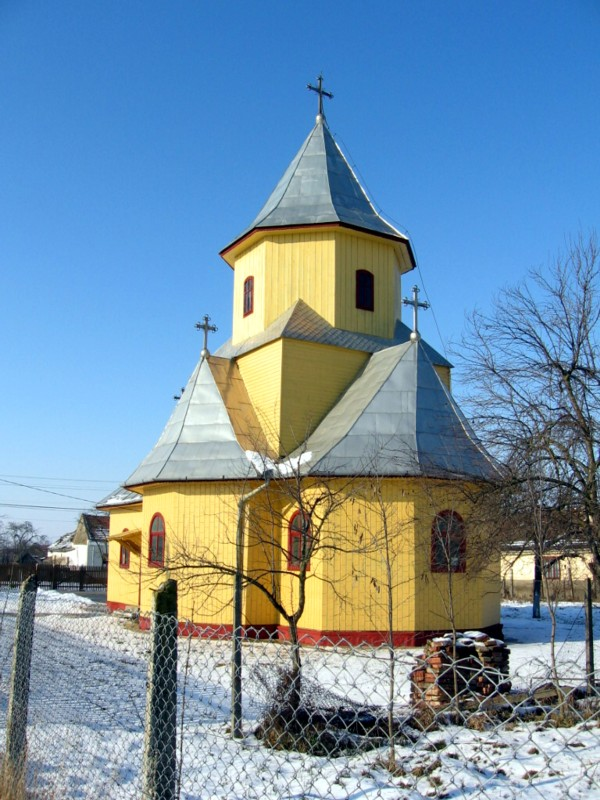
- The Orthodox church in Nițchidorf

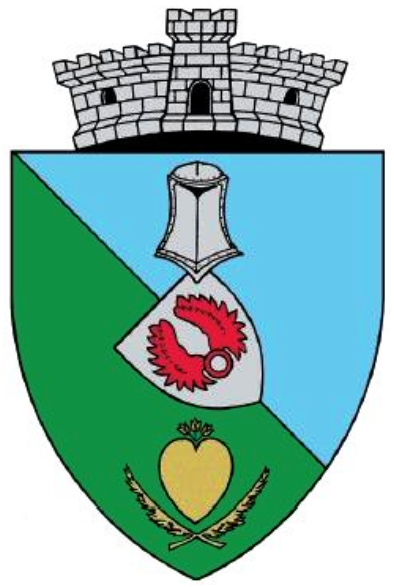
- Coat of arms

- Location in Timiș County

- Location in Romania
- Coordinates: 45°34′57″N 21°31′51″E
- Country: Romania
- County: Timiș
- Established: 1784

Government
  - Mayor (2024–2028): Dănuț-Ionel Drăghici (PSD)
- Area: 64.12 km^{2} (24.76 sq mi)
- Elevation: 132 m (433 ft)
- Population (2021-12-01): 1,483
  - Density: 23.13/km^{2} (59.90/sq mi)
- Time zone: UTC+02:00 (EET)
  - Summer (DST): UTC+03:00 (EEST)
- Postal code: 307295–307297
- Area code: 0256
- Vehicle reg.: TM
- Website: primarianitchidorf.ro

Nițchidorf (literally "Niczky's village"; German: Nizkydorf; Hungarian: Niczkyfalva, originally Kutas; Serbian: Ницкидорф, romanized: Nickidorf) is a commune in Timiș County, Romania. It is composed of three villages: Blajova, Duboz and Nițchidorf (commune seat).

== Geography ==
The commune totals an area of 6,412 ha (15,840 acres), of which 5,398 ha (13,340 acres) are agricultural land and 1,014 ha (2,510 acres) are non-agricultural land. It is located in the plain area of Timiș County, in the hydrographic basin of the Timiș River, bordering Caraș-Severin County and the hilly area on the river corridor.

== History ==
Traces of a fortress were discovered on the nearby Schlossberg ("Castle Hill"; Romanian: Dealul Cetății). According to Hungarian historians Samu Borovszky and Felix Milleker, quoted by Nicolae Ilieșiu, there was a medieval settlement here, attested in 1370 with the name Kwtus. In 1410 it appears as an annex of the parish of Duboz. During the Turkish occupation of Banat (1552–1718), the locality disappeared.

The current village was founded in 1784–1786 during the third wave of colonization of Banat, under Emperor Joseph II. At first, only 200 families were settled here. The origin of the settlers was from Lorraine, Alsace, Swabia, Luxembourg, Schwarzwald, Silesia, etc. Later came settlers from today's Hungary and Bohemia. It was named after Count Kristóf Niczky, the then prefect who took care of its colonization. So it was called Niczkydorf or "Niczky's village". The Romanians from the neighboring villages called it Nichișoara, and today's name is the Romanianized form of the original one.

For two centuries it was an almost exclusively German, Roman Catholic village. The Swabians built the Roman Catholic church in 1825. There was also a mill, which burned down in 1930. After the union of Banat with Romania, the village remained German. The exodus of the Germans began after World War II and accelerated in the late 1980s and early 1990s. Today, Nițchidorf is mostly Romanian.

== Demographics ==
Ethnic composition (2021)
1. Romanians (86.7%)
2. Ukrainians (4.58%)
3. Unknown (7.34%)
4. Others (1.37%)
Religious composition (2021)
1. Orthodox (83.0%)
2. Baptists (3.23%)
3. Roman Catholics (2.36%)
4. Adventists (1.82%)
5. Pentecostals (1.28%)
6. Unknown (7.61%)
7. Others (0.50%)
8. Irreligious, atheists and agnostics (0.20%)

Nițchidorf had a population of 1,483 inhabitants at the 2021 census, down 2.63% from the 2011 census. Most inhabitants are Romanians (86.71%), with a minority of Ukrainians (4.58%). For 7.34% of the population, ethnicity is unknown. By religion, most inhabitants are Orthodox (83%), but there are also minorities of Baptists (3.23%), Roman Catholics (2.36%), Adventists (1.82%) and Pentecostals (1.28%). For 7.61% of the population, religious affiliation is unknown.

Census		Ethnic composition
Year	Population	Romanians	Hungarians	Germans	Ukrainians
1880	2,861	1,015	19	1,803	–
1890	3,205	1,073	26	2,076	–
1900	3,394	1,141	60	2,167	–
1910	3,455	1,226	71	2,123	–
1920	3,278	1,088	35	2,136	–
1930	3,357	1,145	44	2,151	–
1941	3,157	1,035	29	2,078	–
1956	2,837	1,059	26	1,742	–
1966	2,495	1,004	20	1,466	–
1977	2,106	956	14	1,131	–
1992	1,555	1,411	21	59	55
2002	1,583	1,457	29	21	65
2011	1,523	1,352	26	21	49
2021	1,483	1,286	5	11	68

== Politics and administration ==
The commune of Nițchidorf is administered by a mayor and a local council composed of 11 councilors. The mayor, Dănuț-Ionel Drăghici, from the Social Democratic Party, has been in office since 2016. As from the 2024 local elections, the local council has the following composition by political parties:

Party	Seats	Composition
Social Democratic Party	9	
Save Romania Union	2	

== Notable people ==
- Sebastian Kräuter (1922–2008), Roman Catholic bishop
- Balthasar Waitz (b. 1950), writer, translator and journalist
- Herta Müller (b. 1953), writer and recipient of the 2009 Nobel Prize in Literature
