= Boldur =

- Commune
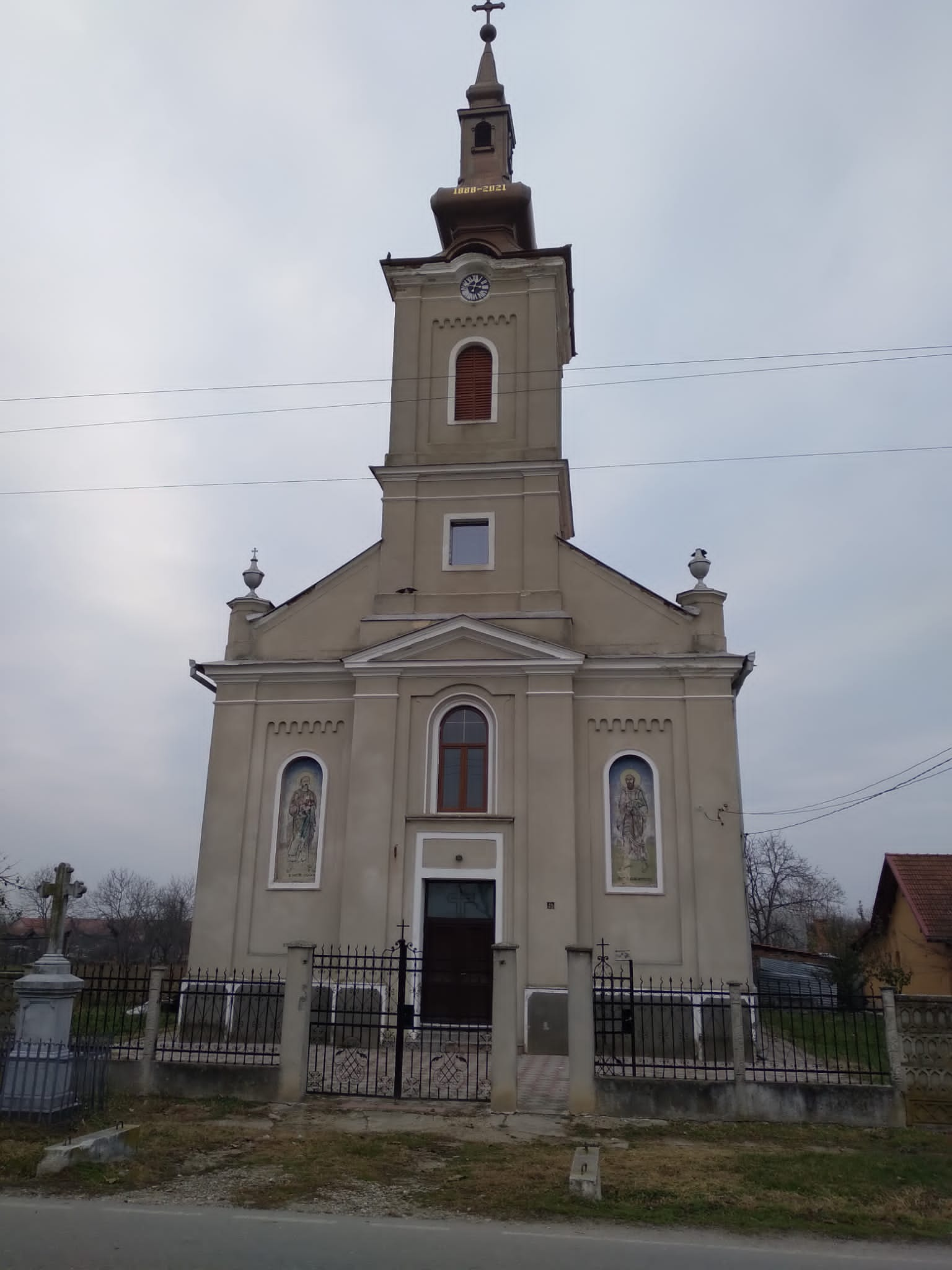
- Orthodox church in Jabăr

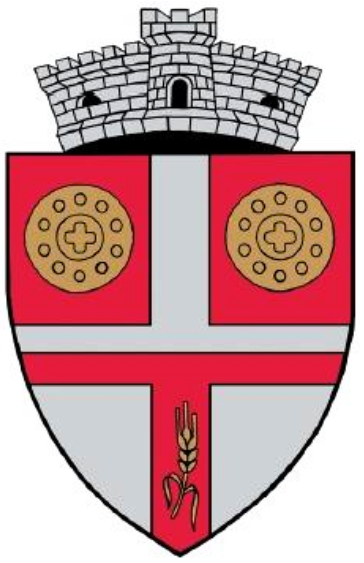
- Coat of arms

- Location in Timiș County

- Location in Romania
- Coordinates: 45°42′N 21°47′E
- Country: Romania
- County: Timiș

Government
  - Mayor (2024–2028): Constantin-Cristian Stoi (PSD)
- Area: 84.81 km^{2} (32.75 sq mi)
- Elevation: 108 m (354 ft)
- Population (2021-12-01): 2,407
  - Density: 28.38/km^{2} (73.51/sq mi)
- Time zone: UTC+02:00 (EET)
  - Summer (DST): UTC+03:00 (EEST)
- Postal code: 307080–307083
- Area code: +(40) 256
- Vehicle reg.: TM

Boldur (Hungarian: Boldor; German: Boldur; Serbian: Болдор, romanized: Boldor) is a commune in Timiș County, Romania. It is composed of four villages: Boldur (commune seat), Jabăr, Ohaba-Forgaci, and Sinersig.

== History ==
The first recorded mention of Boldur dates from 1290, being mentioned in a Hungarian diploma with the name Bulder. In the Middle Ages the name changed, but kept the same root: Boudor (1368), Boldur (1371), Boldor (1416), Boldur (1597), etc. At the end of the 16th century, it was part of the commune of Belinț and belonged to Transylvania. From 1690 to 1700 it is definitely called Boldur. Around 1739 there were colonizations with Romanians from Oltenia (bufeni), against the background of the Austro-Turkish War, which caused the emigration of many families to Banat. In the past, the hearth of the village was on the site of the former cemetery. After the settlement of Oltenians here, Boldur was divided into two areas: that of the frătuți (natives) and that of the bufeni (Oltenians), from which present-day Boldur resulted.

Jabăr was first mentioned in 1597, when Sigismund Báthory donated Sabat together with other localities to the Bejan family. After passing through the property of several noblemen, in 1650 it is an estate of the Aerarium. Around 1690–1700, the toponym Sabar appears in historical documents. This would mean "bullfrog", so the "village of bullfrogs". The consonant J from the root Jabăr appeared through the Hungarianization in zs of the old consonant z, taken over sonorously in Romanian. In 1717 the name of the village was changed to Jabăr. At that time it belonged to the district of Făget and had 33 houses. Before the Revolution of 1848, the village was owned by the Milencovici family, after which the locality was put up for auction.

The first recorded mention of Ohaba-Forgaci is from 1442, when by order of King Ulászló I, the estates of some villages, Chewhaba among them, passed into the possession of Nicolae Turcsin and Mihai Cornethi. On Count Mercy's map it appears in the district of Lugoj, inhabited by Romanians. Around 1880 the name of the village is Csev-Ohaba. The name "Forgaci" was given much later, in honor of the district councilor Antal Forgách to distinguish it from the name "Ohaba" in Transylvania and especially in the counties of Arad and Caraș-Severin.

The first recorded mentions of the existence of Sinersig are from 1323, when it was the property of Ioan Dan, a chatelaine from Jdioara. The name "Sinersig" comes from the older Szénaszeg, the Hungarian széna meaning 'hay', and szeg, 'corner', 'angle', which means that it was formed in a place with hay, in a meadow with a small number of inhabitants. In the documents from Matthias I from 1471, the village appears as "passessio" next to the "castellum" and "appidum" of Hodoș. For a century the estates of the locality knew a series of owners: in 1781 Iosif Kereztury, in 1790 Count Ioan Althyn, and at the beginning of the 19th century it became the property of the Gyurky family. Sinersig was incorporated into the commune of Boldur in August 1968.

== Demographics ==
Ethnic composition (2021)
1. Romanians (90.2%)
2. Ukrainians (1.53%)
3. Unknown (7.06%)
4. Others (1.22%)
Religious composition (2021)
1. Orthodox (77.8%)
2. Greek Catholics (5.02%)
3. Pentecostals (4.40%)
4. Baptists (1.82%)
5. Roman Catholics (1.62%)
6. Unknown (7.60%)
7. Others (1.49%)
8. Irreligious, atheists and agnostics (0.24%)

Boldur had a population of 2,407 inhabitants at the 2021 census, down 1.31% from the 2011 census. Most inhabitants are Romanians (90.19%), with a minority of Ukrainians (1.53%). For 7.06% of the population, ethnicity is unknown. By religion, most inhabitants are Orthodox (77.81%), but there are also minorities of Greek Catholics (5.02%), Pentecostals (4.4%), Baptists (1.82%) and Roman Catholics (1.62%). For 7.6% of the population, religious affiliation is unknown.

Census		Ethnic composition
Year	Population	Romanians	Hungarians	Germans	Ukrainians
1880	4,481	4,159	265	47	–
1890	4,491	4,121	254	62	–
1900	4,680	4,178	342	102	–
1910	4,669	4,149	408	68	–
1920	4,088	3,740	268	53	–
1930	4,076	3,709	278	64	–
1941	3,857	3,503	222	72	–
1956	3,947	3,713	180	30	2
1966	3,693	3,547	115	22	–
1977	3,685	3,527	108	13	6
1992	2,594	2,470	60	4	36
2002	2,567	2,446	51	6	50
2011	2,439	2,257	40	–	39
2021	2,407	2,171	23	–	37

== Politics and administration ==
The commune of Boldur is administered by a mayor and a local council composed of 11 councilors. The mayor, Constantin-Cristian Stoi, from the Social Democratic Party, has been in office since 1996. As from the 2024 local elections, the local council has the following composition by political parties:

Party	Seats	Composition
Social Democratic Party	6	
Save Romania Union–People's Movement Party–Force of the Right	2	
National Liberal Party	1	
Alliance for the Union of Romanians	1	
Social Liberal Humanist Party	1	

== Notable people ==
- Ștefan Petrovici (1859–1922), lawyer and deputy
- Ștefan Pătruț (1938–2003), folklorist and monographer
- Nicolae Sârbu (b. 1945), publicist and poet
- Ioan Iovan (b. 1948), visual artist and art critic
