= Domogled-Valea Cernei National Park =

Protected area in Romania

- Parcul Național Domogled-Valea Cernei
- IUCN category II (national park)
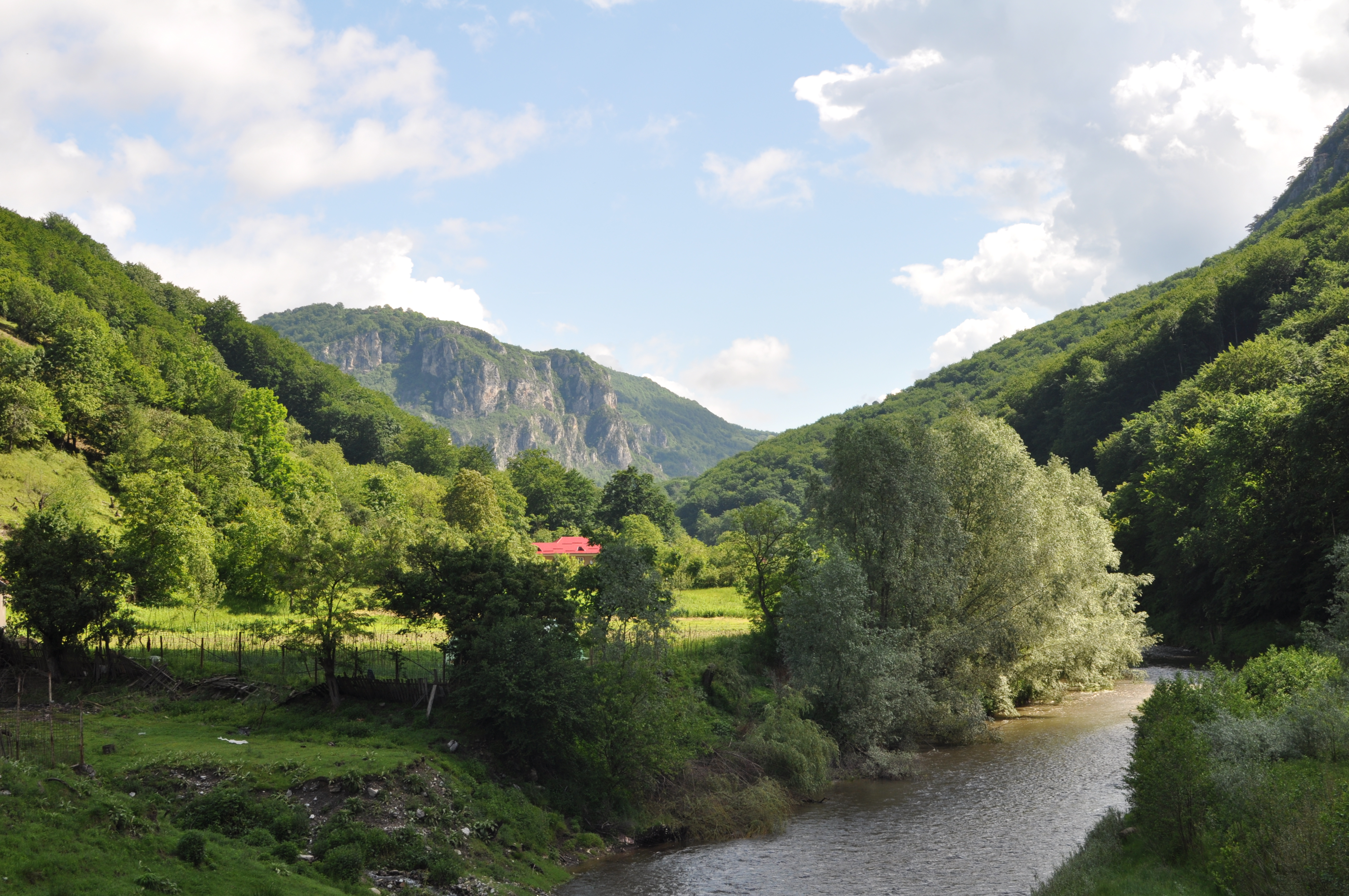
- Domogled-Valea Cernei National Park

- Location within Romania
- Location: Romania; Caraș-Severin County; Gorj County; Mehedinți County
- Nearest city: Orșova
- Coordinates: 45.093°N 22.624°E
- Area: 61,211 hectares (151,260 acres)
- Established: 2000, designation 1982

The Domogled-Valea Cernei National Park (Romanian: Parcul Național Domogled-Valea Cernei) is a protected area (national park category II IUCN) situated in Romania, on the administrative territory of counties Caraș-Severin, Gorj, and Mehedinți.

== Location ==
The National Park stretches across over the Cerna Mountains and the Godeanu Mountains on the right side, and over the Vâlcan Mountains and the Mehedinți Mountains on the left side. It is located in the Retezat-Godeanu Mountains group, a group of mountains in the Southern Carpathians, in the Cerna River basin.

== Description ==
Domogled-Valea Cernei National Park, with an area of 61,211 ha (151,260 acres), was declared protected area by Law Number 5 of March 6, 2000 (published in Romanian Official Paper Number 152 of April 12, 2000) and represents a mountainous area (cirques, mountain peaks, sinkholes, limestone pavements, caves, pit caves, valleys, waterfalls), that shelters a large variety of flora and fauna, some of the species being very rare or even endemics.

=== Nature reserve ===
Protected areas included in the park:

- In Caraș-Severin County
  - Coronini-Bedina (3,864.80 ha)
  - Domogled (2,382.80 ha)
  - Iardașița (501.60 ha)
  - Iauna - Craiova (1,545.10 ha)
  - Bârzoni Cave (0.10 ha)
- In Gorj County
  - Piatra Cloșanilor (1,730 ha)
  - Cheile Corcoaiei (34 ha)
  - Ciucevele Cernei (1,166 ha)
- In Mehedinți County
  - Vârful lui Stan (120 ha)
  - Valea Țesna (160 ha).

The natural area has several types of habitats (Beech forests (Symphyto-Fagion), Asperulo-Fagetum beech forests, Cephalanthero-Fagion Medio-European beech forests, Alluvial forests with Alnus glutinosa and Fraxinus excelsior (Alno-Padion, Alnion incanae, Salicion albae), Acidophilous forests of Picea abies in the mountain region (Vaccinio-Piceetea), Illyrian forests of Fagus sylvatica (Aremonio-Fagion), Tilio-Acerion forests on steep slopes, screes and ravines, Beech forests of Luzulo Fagetum type, Illyrian oak forests with hornbeam (Erythronio-Carpiniori), Alpine and boreal shrubberies, Peri-Pannonian subcontinental shrubberies, Alpine and subalpine calcareous meadows, Molinia meadows on calcareous, peaty or clayey soils (Molinion caeruleae), Pannonian rocky meadows (Stipo Festucetalia pallentis), Semi-natural dry meadows and shrub facies on calcareous substratum (Festuco Brometalia), Calcareous rock-dwelling plants communities or basiphytic meadows of Alysso-Sedion albi, Tree line communities of tall hygrophilous grasses from lowland to montane and alpine levels, Medio-European calcareous screes of hill and montane levels, Siliceous screes of the montane to alpine levels (Androsacetalia alpinae and Galeopsietalia ladani), Mountain meadows, Caves closed to the public, Petrifying springs with travertine formation (Cratoneurion), Rocky slopes with chasmophytic vegetation on calcareous rocks, Sub-Mediterranean forest vegetation with the endemic Pinus nigra ssp. banatica and Herbaceous vegetation on the banks of mountain rivers) harbouring a diverse range of flora and fauna specific to the Carpathian range of the Retezat-Godeanu Mountains.

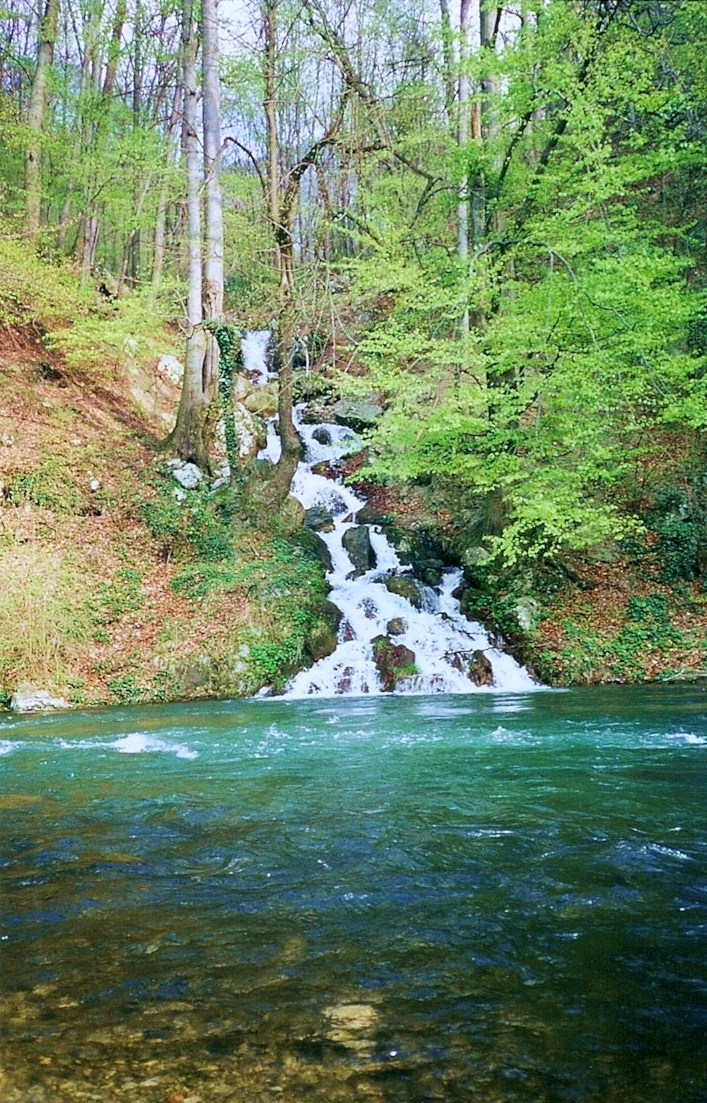
Domogled-Valea Cernei National Park

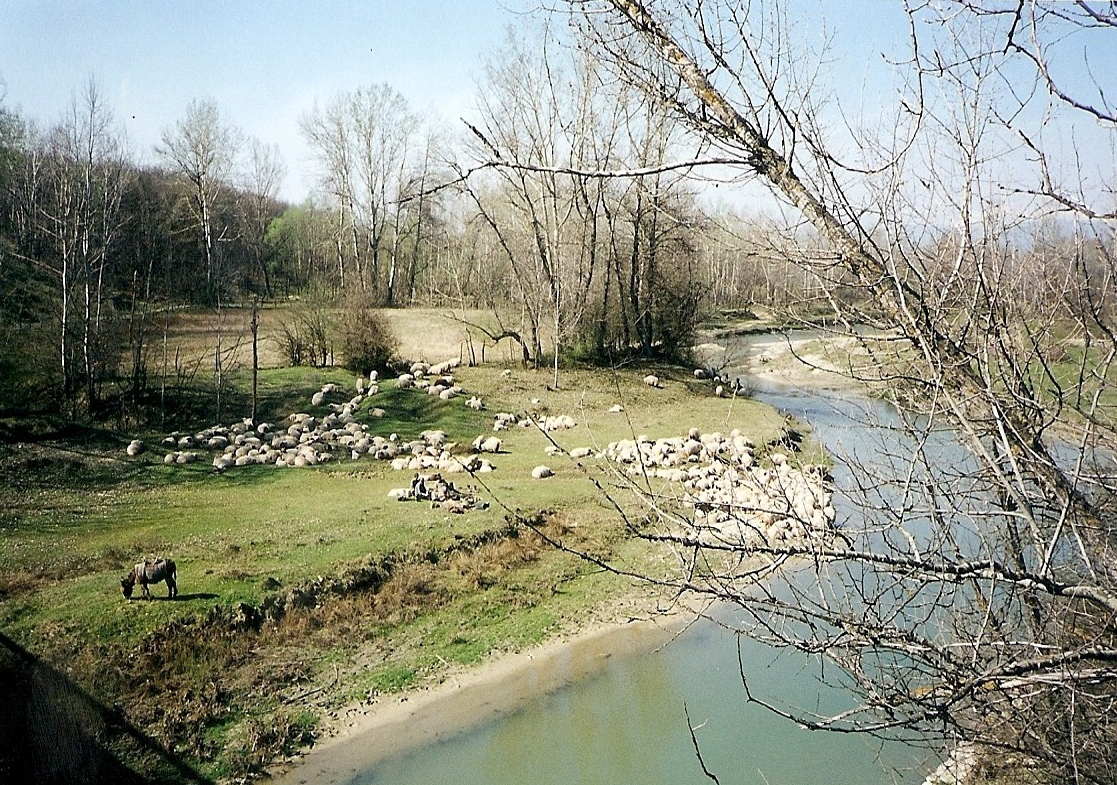
Domogled-Valea Cernei National Park

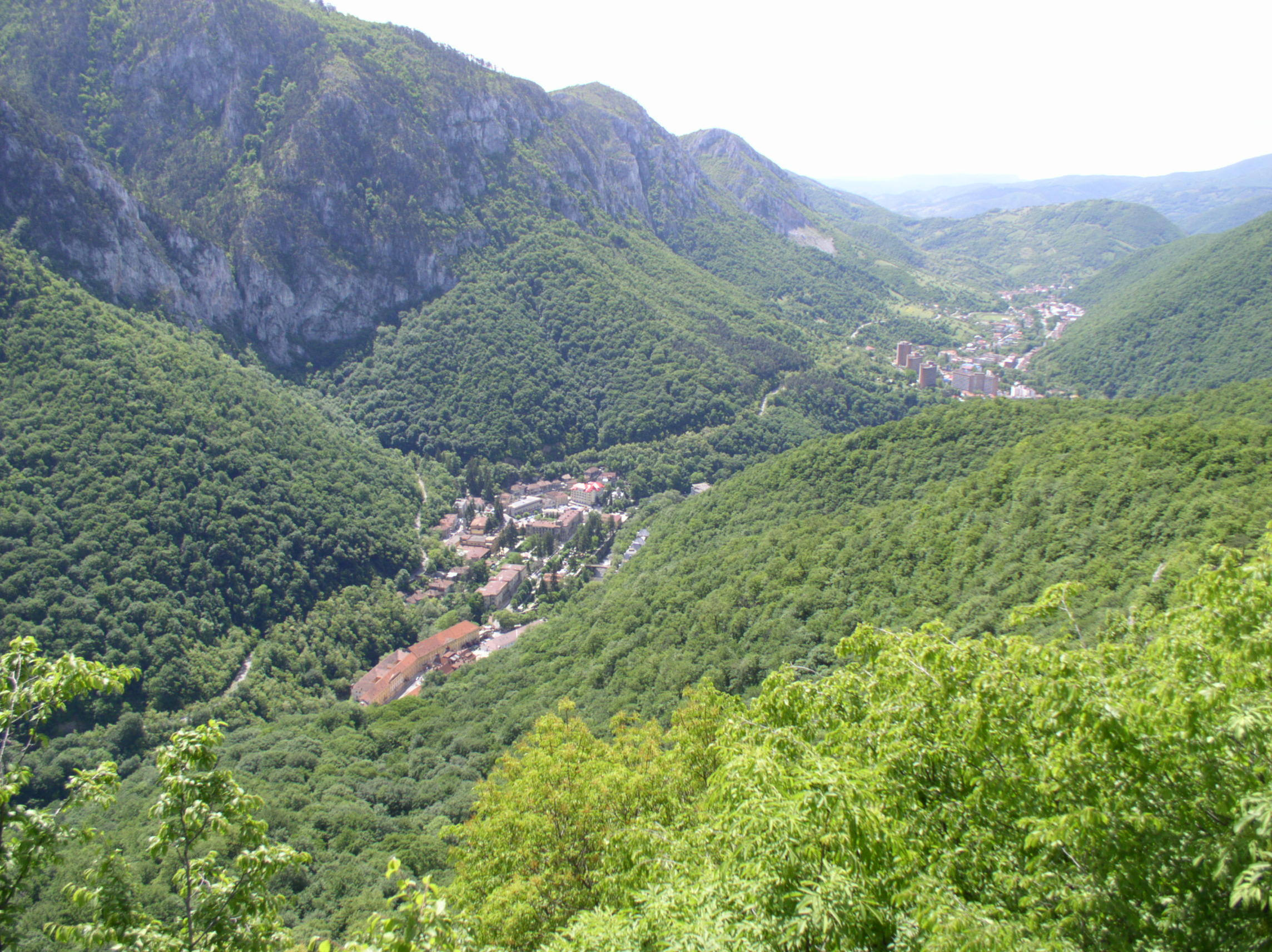
Băile Herculane

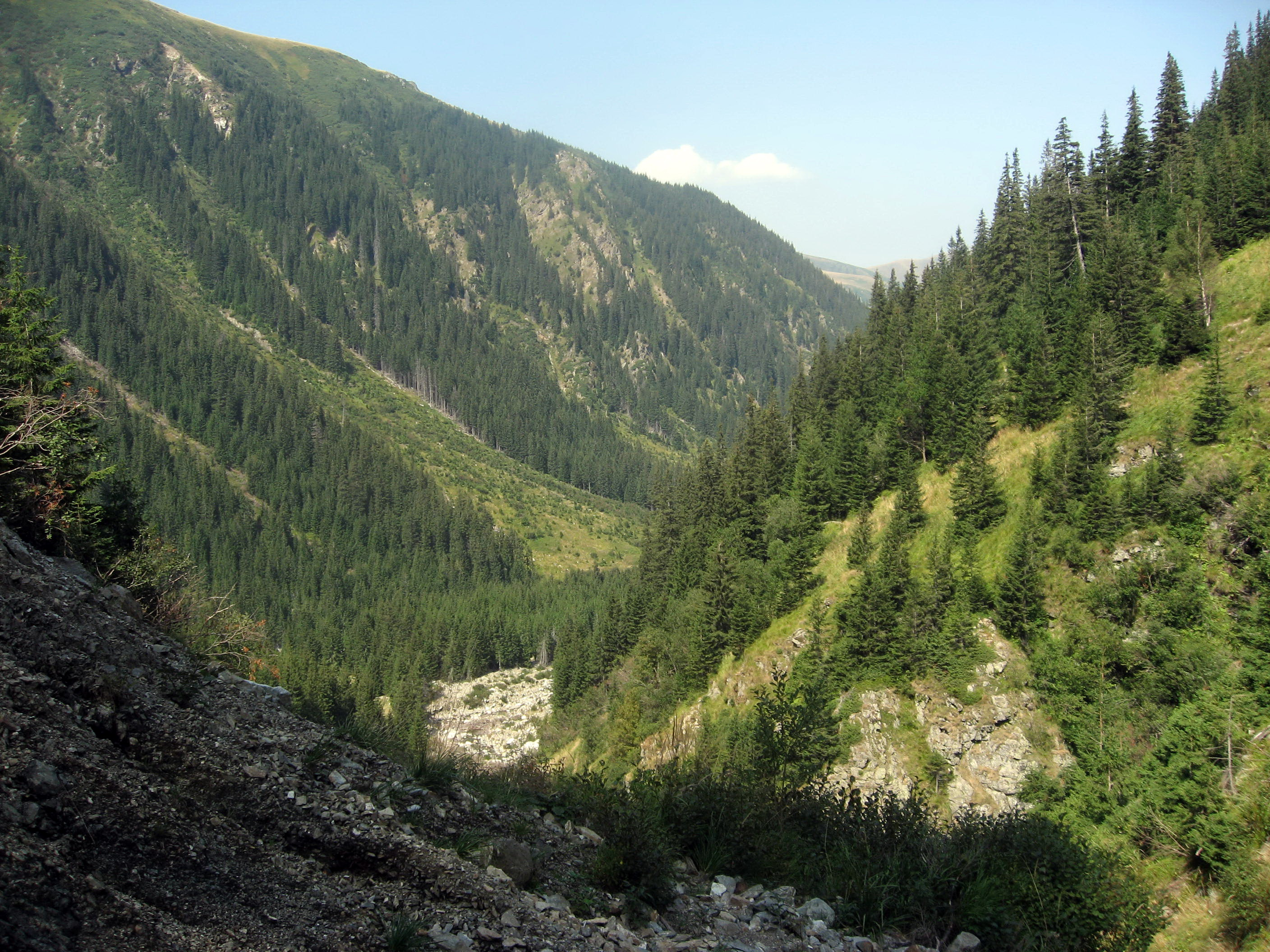
Godeanu mountains

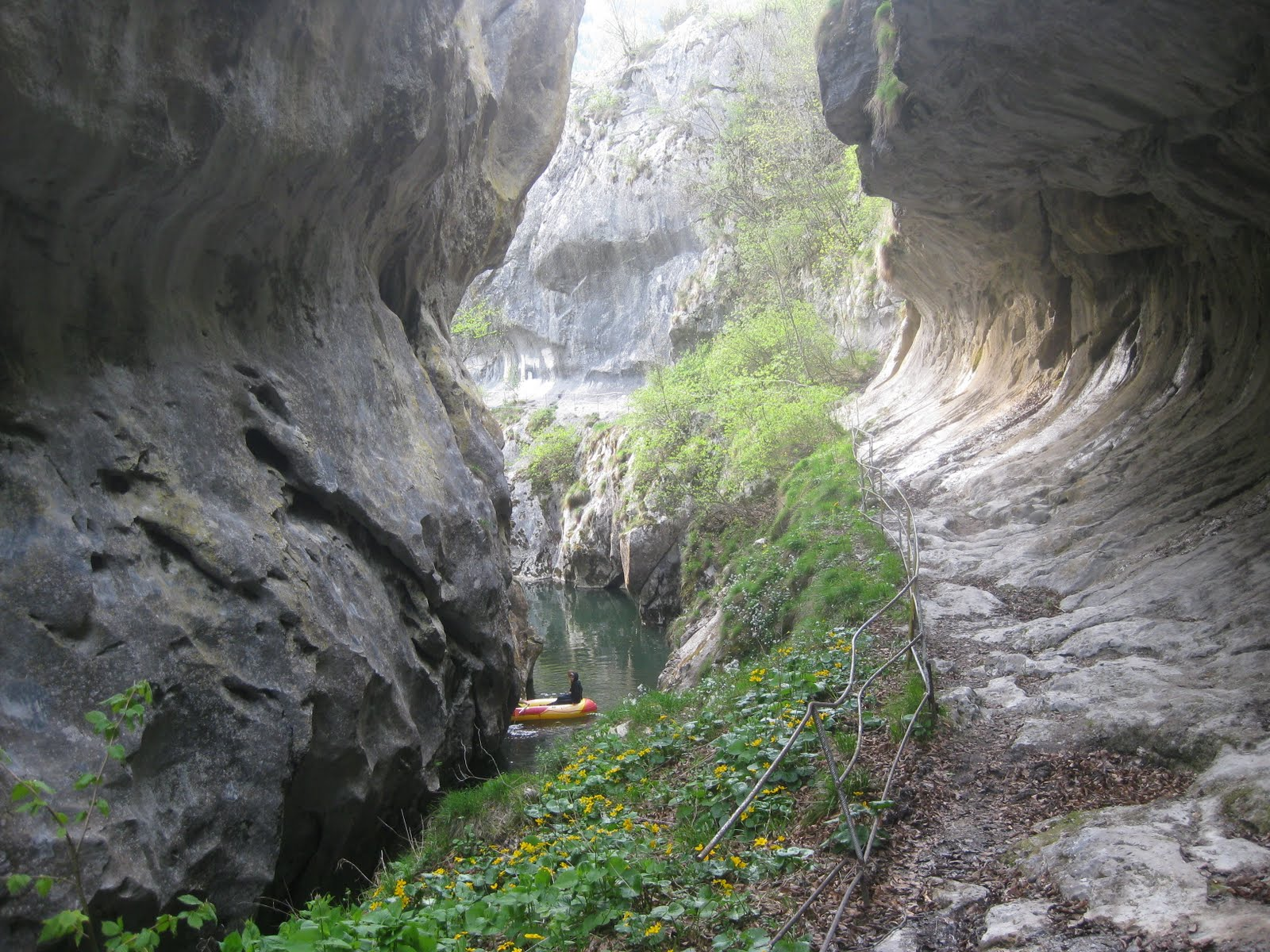
Corcoaia Gorge

== See also ==
- Protected areas of Romania
