= Belareca =

Right tributary of the river Cerna

Belareca Bela Reca
- Location within Romania

Location
- Country: Romania
- Counties: Caraș-Severin County
- Villages: Hora Mică, Cornereva, Pogara, Globurău, Plugova, Mehadia

Physical characteristics
- Mouth: Cerna
  - location: Pecinișca
  - coordinates: 44.8601°N 22.3894°E
- Length: 36 km (22 mi)
- Basin size: 713 km^{2} (275 sq mi)

Basin features
- Progression: Cerna→ Danube→ Black Sea
- Tributaries
  - left: Ranica, Bolvașnița
  - right: Mehadica, Sverdinul Mare

The Belareca or Bela Reca is a right tributary of the river Cerna in Romania. It discharges into the Cerna near the town Băile Herculane. Its length is 36 km (22 mi) and its basin size is 713 km^{2} (275 sq mi).
