= Lake Prisaca =

Lake in Romania

- Location within Romania
- Coordinates: 44°56′21″N 22°27′46″E
- Type: artificial
- Primary inflows: Cerna River
- Primary outflows: Cerna River
- Basin countries: Romania
- Max. length: 5 km (3.1 mi)
- Max. width: 0.16 km (0.099 mi)
- Surface elevation: 225 m (738 ft)

Lake Prisaca (Romanian: Lacul Prisaca) is an elongated lake in the Cerna River in Caraș-Severin County, southwestern Romania. It is located about 6 kilometres north of Băile Herculane and northeast of Mehadia.
