= Ranica (river) =

- Location within Romania

Location
- Country: Romania
- Counties: Caraș-Severin County
- Villages: Zmogotin, Zănogi, Dolina

Physical characteristics
- Mouth: Belareca
  - location: Cornereva
  - coordinates: 45.0621°N 22.4180°E
- Length: 10 km (6.2 mi)
- Basin size: 67 km^{2} (26 sq mi)

Basin features
- Progression: Belareca→ Cerna→ Danube→ Black Sea

The Ranica (also: Ramna) is a left tributary of the river Belareca in Romania. It flows into the Belareca in Cornereva. Its length is 10 km (6.2 mi) and its basin size is 67 km^{2} (26 sq mi).
