= Vânturătoarea Waterfall =

Coordinates: 44°58′12″N 22°28′25″E

The Vânturătoarea Waterfall (Romanian: Cascada Vânturătoarea) is a waterfall north of Băile Herculane, Caraș-Severin County, southwestern Romania. It is about 50 m (160 ft) high, and consists of two drops, one of which is the highest single drop waterfall of Romania at 40 m (130 ft). It is on a small right tributary of the Cerna.
