= Olanul =

- Location within Romania

Location
- Country: Romania
- Counties: Gorj County

Physical characteristics
- Source: Godeanu Mountains
- Mouth: Cerna
  - location: Cerna-Sat
  - coordinates: 45.1160°N 22.6677°E
- Length: 13 km (8.1 mi)
- Basin size: 47 km^{2} (18 sq mi)

Basin features
- Progression: Cerna→ Danube→ Black Sea
- Tributaries
  - left: Stârminos

The Olanul is a right tributary of the river Cerna in Romania. It discharges into the Cerna near Cerna-Sat. Its source is in the Godeanu Mountains. Its length is 13 km (8.1 mi) and its basin size is 47 km^{2} (18 sq mi).
