= Sverdinul Mare =

- Location within Romania

Location
- Country: Romania
- Counties: Caraș-Severin County

Physical characteristics
- Mouth: Belareca
  - location: Mehadia
  - coordinates: 44.9054°N 22.3637°E
- Length: 21 km (13 mi)
- Basin size: 75 km^{2} (29 sq mi)

Basin features
- Progression: Belareca→ Cerna→ Danube→ Black Sea

The Sverdinul Mare is a right tributary of the river Belareca in Romania. It discharges into the Belareca in Mehadia. Its length is 21 km (13 mi) and its basin size is 75 km^{2} (29 sq mi).
