= Globurău mine =

Manganese mine in Caraș-Severin County, Romania

- Location: Mehadia, Caraș-Severin County, Romania
- Products: Manganese
- Production: 20,000 tonnes
- Company: MinBucovina

The Globurău mine is a large mine in the west of Romania in Caraș-Severin County, 29 km (18 mi) north of Orșova and 392 km (244 mi) west of the capital, Bucharest. Globurău is one of the largest manganese reserves in Romania, with estimated reserves of 3 million tons of manganese.
