= Iauna =

- Location within Romania

Location
- Country: Romania
- Counties: Caraș-Severin County

Physical characteristics
- Mouth: Cerna
  - coordinates: 45.059°N 22.601°E
- Length: 7 km (4.3 mi)
- Basin size: 23 km^{2} (8.9 sq mi)

Basin features
- Progression: Cerna→ Danube→ Black Sea

The Iauna is a right tributary of the river Cerna in Romania. It discharges into the Cerna near Țațu. Its length is 7 km (4.3 mi) and its basin size is 23 km^{2} (8.9 sq mi).
