= Godeanu River =

Godeanu River may refer to:

- Godeanu, a tributary of the river Valea lui Iovan in Gorj County
- the upper reach of the river Orăștie in Hunedoara County

== See also ==
- Godeanu
