= Timiș-Cerna Gap =

Third Approach
- Location: Romania
- Range: Southern Carpathians/Banat Mountains

Timiș-Cerna Gap (Romanian: Culoarul Timiș-Cerna) is a mountain pass in South-Western Romania, mostly in Caraș-Severin County, dividing the Southern Carpathians and the Banat mountain ranges, both part of the Carpathians.

The pass follows the paths of the rivers Timiș (which flows northward) and Cerna (which flows southward). To the west lie the Almăj and Semenic Mountains and to the east the Mehedinți, Cerna, Țarcului, and Poiana Ruscă Mountains.

The town of Caransebeș lies in the Timiș-Cerna Gap and Orșova lies on the Danube at the gap's southern end.
