= Sacherștița =

- Location within Romania

Location
- Country: Romania
- Counties: Caraș-Severin County
- Villages: Topleț

Physical characteristics
- Mouth: Cerna
  - coordinates: 44.8048°N 22.3877°E

Basin features
- Progression: Cerna→ Danube→ Black Sea

The Sarcherștița is a right tributary of the river Cerna in Romania. It discharges into the Cerna near the village Bârza. Its length is 15 km (9.3 mi) and its basin size is 49 km^{2} (19 sq mi).
