= Prisăcina =

- Location within Romania

Location
- Country: Romania
- Counties: Caraș-Severin County
- Villages: Prisăcina

Physical characteristics
- Mouth: Cerna
  - coordinates: 44.9908°N 22.5150°E
- Length: 7 km (4.3 mi)
- Basin size: 13 km^{2} (5.0 sq mi)

Basin features
- Progression: Cerna→ Danube→ Black Sea

The Prisăcina is a right tributary of the river Cerna in Romania. It flows into the Cerna near Cracu Mare. Its length is 7 km (4.3 mi) and its basin size is 13 km^{2} (5.0 sq mi).
