= Jelerău =

- Location within Romania

Location
- Country: Romania
- Counties: Caraș-Severin County
- Towns: Băile Herculane

Physical characteristics
- Mouth: Cerna
  - location: Băile Herculane
  - coordinates: 44.8864°N 22.4224°E
- Length: 5 km (3.1 mi)
- Basin size: 10 km^{2} (3.9 sq mi)

Basin features
- Progression: Cerna→ Danube→ Black Sea

The Jelerău is a left tributary of the river Cerna in Romania. It flows into the Cerna in the town Băile Herculane. Its length is 5 km (3.1 mi) and its basin size is 10 km^{2} (3.9 sq mi).
