= Jardașița Mare =

- Location within Romania

Location
- Country: Romania
- Counties: Caraș-Severin County

Physical characteristics
- Mouth: Cerna
  - location: Bârza
  - coordinates: 44.8246°N 22.3855°E
- Length: 14 km (8.7 mi)
- Basin size: 42 km^{2} (16 sq mi)

Basin features
- Progression: Cerna→ Danube→ Black Sea

The Jardașița Mare (also: Iardașița) is a right tributary of the river Cerna in Romania. It flows into the Cerna near Bârza. Its length is 14 km (8.7 mi) and its basin size is 42 km^{2} (16 sq mi).
