= Craiova (disambiguation) =

Craiova is a city in Romania.

Craiova may also refer to the following rivers in Romania:

- Craiova (Cerna), a tributary of the Cerna in Caraș-Severin County
- Craiova, another name for the river Globu in Caraș-Severin County
