= Valea lui Iovan =

- Location within Romania

Location
- Country: Romania
- Counties: Gorj County

Physical characteristics
- Mouth: Cerna
  - coordinates: 45.164°N 22.732°E
- Length: 11 km (6.8 mi)
- Basin size: 31 km^{2} (12 sq mi)

Basin features
- Progression: Cerna→ Danube→ Black Sea
- Tributaries
  - right: Godeanu
- River code: VI.2.3

The Valea lui Iovan (also: Iovanu) is a river in Romania, right tributary of the Cerna. Its source is in the Godeanu Mountains. It discharges into the Valea lui Iovan Reservoir. Its length is 11 km (6.8 mi) and its basin size is 31 km^{2} (12 sq mi). In its upper course, it is also called Scărișoara and Scărița.
