= Valea Cărbunelui =

- Location within Romania

Location
- Country: Romania
- Counties: Gorj County

Physical characteristics
- Mouth: Cerna
  - location: Valea lui Iovan Lake
  - coordinates: 45.1798°N 22.7672°E
- Length: 11 km (6.8 mi)
- Basin size: 41 km^{2} (16 sq mi)

Basin features
- Progression: Cerna→ Danube→ Black Sea
- Tributaries
  - right: Radocheasa
- River code: VI.2.2

The Valea Cărbunelui is a right tributary of the river Cerna in Romania. It discharges into the Valea lui Iovan Reservoir. Its length is 11 km (6.8 mi) and its basin size is 41 km^{2} (16 sq mi).
