= Craiova (Cerna) =

- Location within Romania

Location
- Country: Romania
- Counties: Caraș-Severin County

Physical characteristics
- Mouth: Cerna
  - coordinates: 45.1051°N 22.6557°E
- Length: 16 km (9.9 mi)
- Basin size: 38 km^{2} (15 sq mi)

Basin features
- Progression: Cerna→ Danube→ Black Sea

The Craiova is a right tributary of the river Cerna in Romania. It flows into the Cerna downstream from Cerna-Sat. Its length is 16 km (9.9 mi) and its basin size is 38 km^{2} (15 sq mi).
