= Ioan Talpeș =

Romanian army general (born 1944)

Ioan Talpeș (born 24 August 1944) is a Romanian senator, who previously served as a Romanian Army general, military historian and politician. He served as head of the Romanian Foreign Intelligence Service (SIE) from 1992 to 1997. In 1997–8, Talpeș served as Ambassador to Bulgaria and acted as an advisor to President Ion Iliescu from 1999 to 2000. He is currently an independent Senator representing Caraș-Severin County, having resigned from the Social Democratic Party (PSD) in May 2005 because of a scandal involving the party.

== Biography ==
=== Communist period ===
Talpeș was born in Topleț commune, Caraș-Severin County. He graduated from the University of Bucharest's Faculty of History in 1970, and received a PhD in History in 1980. The same year, he graduated from the Nicolae Bălcescu School of Active Officers in Sibiu.

Talpeș served as a research military officer at the Bucharest Center for Study and Research in the Field of History and Military Theory (within the Defense Ministry) from 1970 to 1988.

=== Post-1989 career ===
Following the Romanian Revolution of 1989 and the fall of the Nicolae Ceaușescu communist regime, Talpeș relinquished his position at Editura Militară, and served President Iliescu as an advisor from July 1990 to April 1992. In March 1992, Talpeș was appointed head of SIE, a position he held until 1997. During this period, Talpeș was promoted to the rank of general.

Immediately following the 1996 elections, Talpeș was appointed ambassador to Bulgaria by the head of state, Emil Constantinescu. He served in that capacity until 20 December 1998, following his resignation in November.

In January 1999, Talpeș resumed his duties as a personal advisor to Iliescu, who was at the time leader of the PSD. When Iliescu was again elected President of Romania in December 2000, he appointed Talpeș head of the National Security Department and chief of the Presidential Administration.

On 8 March 2004, Prime Minister Adrian Năstase appointed Talpeș State Minister for the Coordination of National Defense, European Integration, and Justice, one of three "super minister" positions created as part of the government reshuffle to prepare for entry in the European Union.

Talpeș was elected to the Parliament of Romania in December 2004, where he continues to serve as a Senator representing his home county of Caraș-Severin.

Ioan Talpeș is particular mentioned in the report of the investigator of the Council of Europe to illegal activities of the U.S. secret service CIA in Europe, Dick Marty, as one of the persons, who authorized or at least knew about and have to stand accountable for torture prisons on the Mihail Kogălniceanu military base from 2003 to 2005. In April 2015, Talpeș confirmed to Der Spiegel that from 2003 to 2006, he had allowed the CIA use of a building in Bucharest. Talpeș stated he never visited the building and explicitly told his CIA counterpart that the Romanians did not want to know what was taking place inside.
