= Mehadia =

- Commune
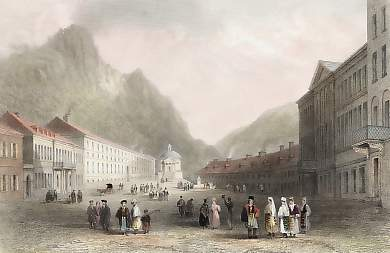
- Baths of Mehadia, 1842

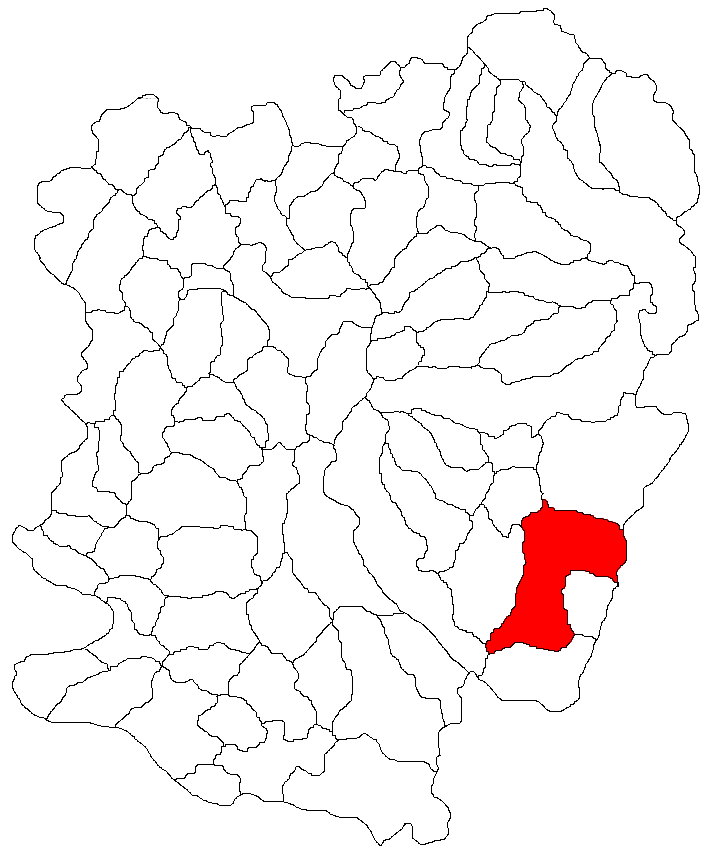
- Location in Caraș-Severin County

- Location in Romania
- Coordinates: 44°54′N 22°22′E
- Country: Romania
- County: Caraș-Severin

Government
  - Mayor (2024–2028): Grigore Petru Bardac (PSD)
- Area: 179.4 km^{2} (69.3 sq mi)
- Elevation: 176 m (577 ft)
- Population (2021-12-01): 3,512
  - Density: 19.58/km^{2} (50.70/sq mi)
- Time zone: UTC+02:00 (EET)
  - Summer (DST): UTC+03:00 (EEST)
- Postal code: 327270
- Area code: (+40) 02 55
- Vehicle reg.: CS
- Website: primariamehadia.ro

Mehadia (Hungarian: Mehádia; German: Mehadia; Turkish: Mehadiye) is a small market town and commune in Caraș-Severin County, Banat, Romania. It lies on the European route E70, in the Cerna River valley. The town is located on the site of the ancient Roman colony Ad Mediam and was noted for its Hercules baths. It had a population of 2,492 in 1900, 4,128 in 2011, and 3,512 in 2021. Fluctuations in populations are partly due to major flooding, to which the area is prone. The 1838 floods destroyed some 2,000 houses in the valley and the 1841 floods in Mehadia were also devastating. It experienced major flooding in May 2005 and September 2014.

The commune is composed of four villages: Globurău (Golbor), Mehadia, Plugova (Ekés), and Valea Bolvașnița (Bolvásvölgy).

Historical population
Year	Pop.	±%
1880	2,097	—
1890	2,480	+18.3%
1900	2,492	+0.5%
1910	2,504	+0.5%
1930	2,162	−13.7%
1941	2,346	+8.5%
1977	1,968	−16.1%
1992	2,834	+44.0%
2002	4,474	+57.9%
2011	4,128	−7.7%
2021	3,512	−14.9%
Source: Census data

== Etymology ==
The Romanian historian, Alexandru Dimitrie Xenopol, stated that the name of the town had been derived from the ancient Roman name Ad Mediam. Linguist Cicerone Poghirc proposed that the Romans had adopted a hypotethical (non-attested) native *Mehedia or *Mehadia form. Most linguists agree that the Romanians adopted the medieval Hungarian name of the town which was first recorded as Michald in 1323.

== History ==
During the Roman period, Mehadia was the known by the name "Ad Medium"; the ruins of a fortress and other Roman antiquaries testify this fact. The Hercules baths also are of Roman vintage known in that period as Thermae Herculis or Ponies Herculis. Subsequent to the fall of the Roman Empire, the place was deserted till it was restored in recent times (after 1735) and the springs are most visited (June to September are the best months for visiting the baths). The Roman road from the Danube to Dacia was close to this village. Recent archaeological excavations have further substantiated the Roman period rule in the region. Many inscriptions dedicated to Hercules which testify the Hadrian reign of the Romans are seen at the baths.

Mehadia is mentioned as the seat of a Romanian district in 1376. In 1788, the Battle of Mehadia took place in this area, in which Ottoman forces resulted victorius against the Habsburg monarchy.

During the continent floods of 1910, Mehadia suffered serious loss to farms and property and several hundred people died; 600 houses were destroyed.

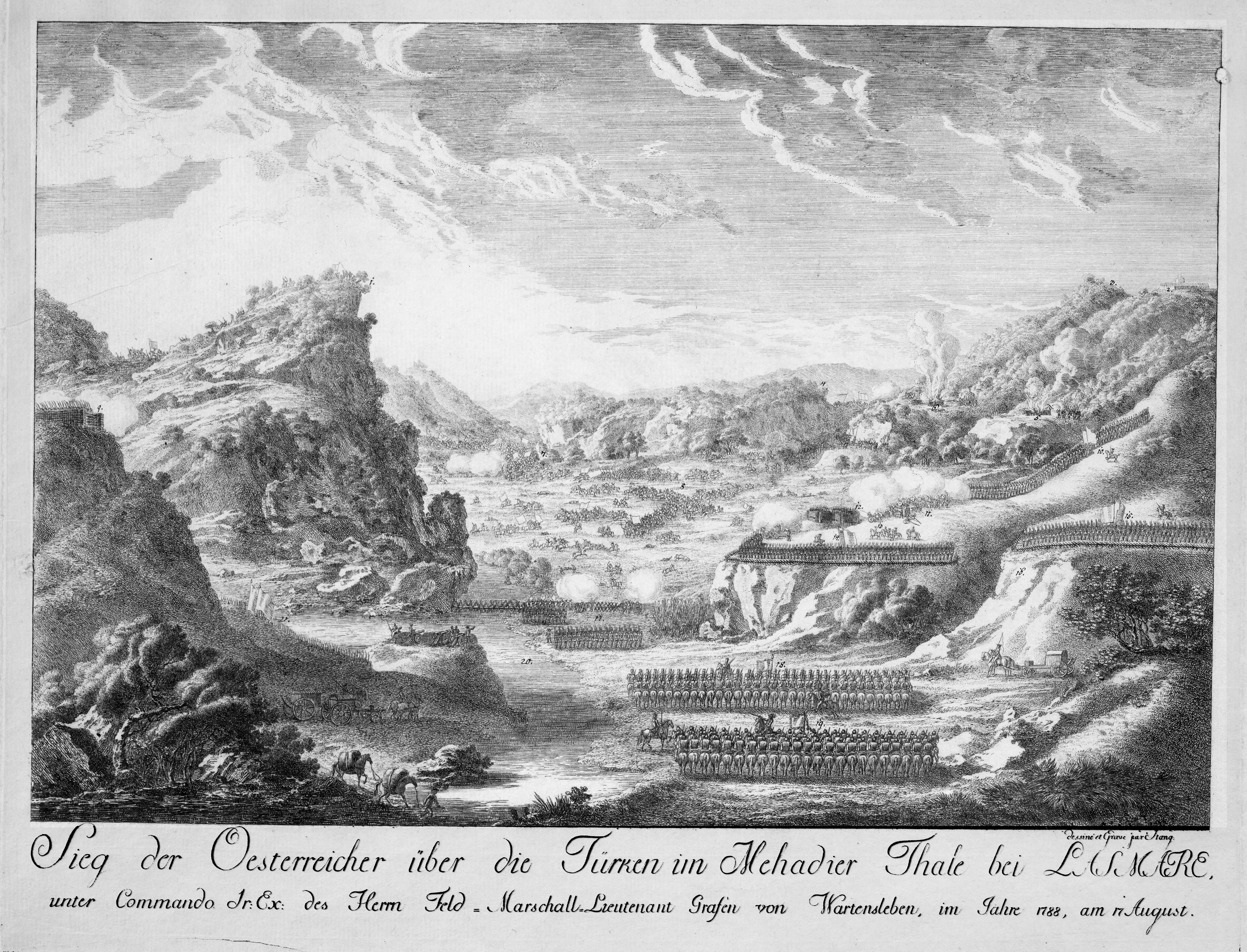
1788 Battle in Mehadia valley

== Geography ==
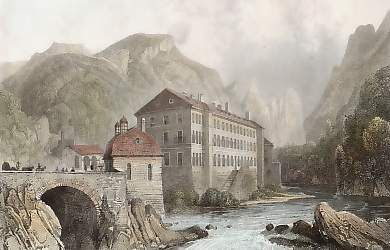
Mehadia in 1835

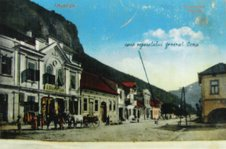
Postcard of Mehadia in 1918

Mehadia is located in southwestern Romania in the Cerna valley at an elevation of 287 m (942 ft). It is located along European route E70, south of the village of Plugova and north of Topleț. Beyond Topleț to the south is Orșova, which was for many years the residence of a Pasha and contained a prominent Turkish fortress. The town of Băile Herculane lies nearby to the east. Different parts of the river valley in the commune have different names such as the Shupanek valley and Coramnic. To the northeast of the main town is an elongated lake named Lacul Prisaca. A suspension bridge crosses the river near Mehadia in an area which is said to smell strongly of sulphur. The road to Mehadia passes through a broad forested scenic valley and crosses a Roman Aqueduct. The aqueduct has only 11 arches remaining in an otherwise well preserved state. They are made of large field stones and red bricks placed over a four layered field stones.

Geologically, the Plugova Fault exists between the Vârciorova and Bolvașnița valleys on the eastern boundary of the river basin and the Belibuc Fault also lies in the Plugova vicinity.

== Wild life and flora ==
Wild life found in the vicinity of Mehadia are mainly wolves and bears.

In the mild climate of Mehadia, fig trees grow in profusion.

== Culture ==
The famous baths of Mehadia were known to the Romans as "The Baths of Hercules". It is a celebrated place for its mineral springs, which are located in a narrow rocky gorge. The springs rise in Banat in the Cerna valley, about a mile from the Mehadia town. Originally, 22 hot springs existed. However, now only nine springs are known of which the popular one is Hercules spring, which emanates from fissures. The temperature of the water, on an average, remains in the range of 70 to 145 0 F. The nine different springs in use have varying degree of chemical content with the usual sulphurated hydrogen gas, lime sulphate, soda and lime, nitrogen gas, carbonic acid gas. However, the Hercules bath does not contain sulphurated hydrogen. The temperature is controlled through a cooling apparatus. Eye treatment is also arranged with the spring water, apart from the therapeutic healing powers for scrofula, joint pains, chronic rheumatism, gout, indolent skin diseases, complicated mercurial afflictions, hysteria, hypochondria ad many other “opprobria medica”. The spring waters which are rich in hydrogen in particular, are popular for cures of cutaneous disorders, paralysis and apoplexy. The yield of these springs have been estimated as 5,500 cu ft (160 m^{3}) of water even during the dry season. The water temperature of some of the springs reported in a German publication in degrees on the Réaumur scale (°C = °Ré × 1.25) are: The Kalkabad 30 °Ré, the Rauber bad or Hercules Spring 35.5 °Ré, the Old Gliederbad 30.5 °Ré; the Augenbader 42 °Ré the new Giledarbad 20 °Ré; the Spring Brunnon 47.5 °Ré; The Schindel or Ledwige bad 36.5 °Ré; the Schwitzhloch 30 v; the Fiedrabad 30.5 °Ré; and Franciscilbad 25 °Ré.

There are ruins of a Praetorium and civilian settlement about 3 km (1.9 mi) northwest of Mehadia and about 2 km (1.2 mi) south of Plugova on the left side of the E 70 at 44°55′0″N 22°21′0″E.

The Koramnik part of the commune historically contained a gypsy encampment along the river bank. Traditionally the locals grew peaches and Muscat grapes and produced wine. Gypsies in the area were known for their vibrant music and Germanic theatrical influences.

=== Houses ===
There are no small houses in Mehadia. They are built in narrow “Platz” with a statue of Hercules in the middle, placed over spout shaped like a crocodile from which the clear spring water emerges. The houses are painted in pale green or yellow colour, have high roofs with overhanging eves and with brownish tiles in the backdrop of the rocky mountains.

=== Costumes ===
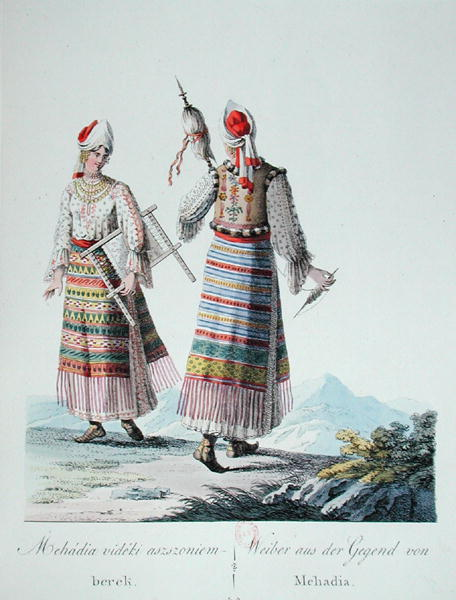
Women of Mehadia in traditional dress

The peasants of Mehadia wear picturesque costumes and walk with a graceful bearing. The comely women wear braided hair, which is braided in bands and twisted round the head and bedecked with flowers. The hair seen in different colours is attributed to the traditional custom, followed by women even today, of wearing the hair of several generations of women as natural inheritance from mother, grandmother and great grand mother, along with their own. The native colourful dresses which the women wear is described as “The Obrescha, a broad girdle with red fringe hanging to the instep and worn over the white shift, gives them occasionally, as they walk along the road with the long disheveled web flaunting in the wind, a wild witch like air”.

== Economic development ==
Mehadia forest resources are proposed to be exploited by new company known as Woodex Industries. The project started in 2001 envisaged manufacture of large wood laminated boards.

The road networks in and around Mehadia are also under a major expansion and rehabilitation programme. The upgrading of the roads to international standards is aimed at meeting the increased traffic in the region and to minimise occurrence of accidents, to improving traffic safety and create new parking lots.

The baths in Mehadia are now provided with elegant accommodation to stay and are provided with modern amenities.

== Archaeological excavations ==
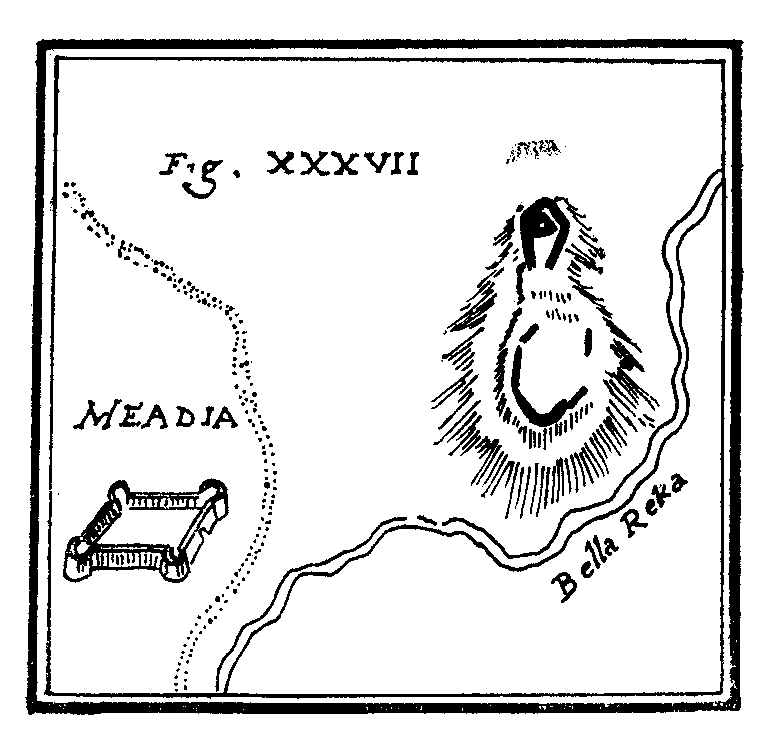
Plan of the Roman Castra of Mehadia (also known as Praetorium), published in the 1726 work Danubius Pannonico-Mysicus, Vol. 2 by the Italian naturalist and soldier Luigi Ferdinando Marsigli (1658–1730).

The Mehadia archaeological site is spread over an area of 7 ha. The "Roman champ" is the site where excavations were initiated since 1942. The Roman champ has been investigated in two stages – the first stage excavation was in earth while the second stage was in stone formations in pits of 116×142.6 m size. These have unearthed many Roman antiquaries buried under agricultural fields of corn and private orchards. A defence system dated to 101 has been discovered near the confluence of the Bolvașnița stream with the Bela Reka River. It has been inferred that the Emperor Trajan had set up his army establishment here during the first phase of the war with the Dacians. A relic of a military diploma was found. This diploma is stated to belong to a soldier of the Cohors I Ulpia Brittonum, a personal guard of the emperor.

Epigraphical information read at the base of the Roman champ provides link to the Cohors III Delmatarum. In addition, temporary military establishments of "Cohors VII Raetorum, detachments from Legio XIII Gemina, Legio V Macedonica and from Legio III Flavia Felix and Legio VII Claudia" have also been identified. The defense system was created to protect the Dierna city from northern invasions. In the constricted area of the Roman champ, "a circular military vicus", which extends along the Bela Reka River up to the thermae has also been identified. A graveyard of the Roman period has also been discovered on the bank of the Bolvașnița stream, in the northern part the Roman champ. Further, excavations have also revealed "the Capitolium of the civilian settlement at Praetorium – Mehadia", which has a temple built by the soldiers of the Cohors III Delmatarum ¥.

== Notable people ==
- Maria Alexandru (1939–2024), world champion tennis player
- Nicolae Cena (1844–1922), general
- Gheorghe Domășnean (1868–1940), general and politician
- Nicolae Kovács (1911–1977), football player and coach

== Sources ==
- Moldovanu, Dragoș (2010). "Toponimie de origine Romană în Transilvania și în sud-vestul Moldovei" (PDF). Anuar de Lingvistică şi Istorie Literară (in Romanian). XLIX–L. Institute of Geography, Romanian Academy: 17–95. Archived from the original (PDF) on 5 March 2016.
