= Retezat-Godeanu Mountains group =

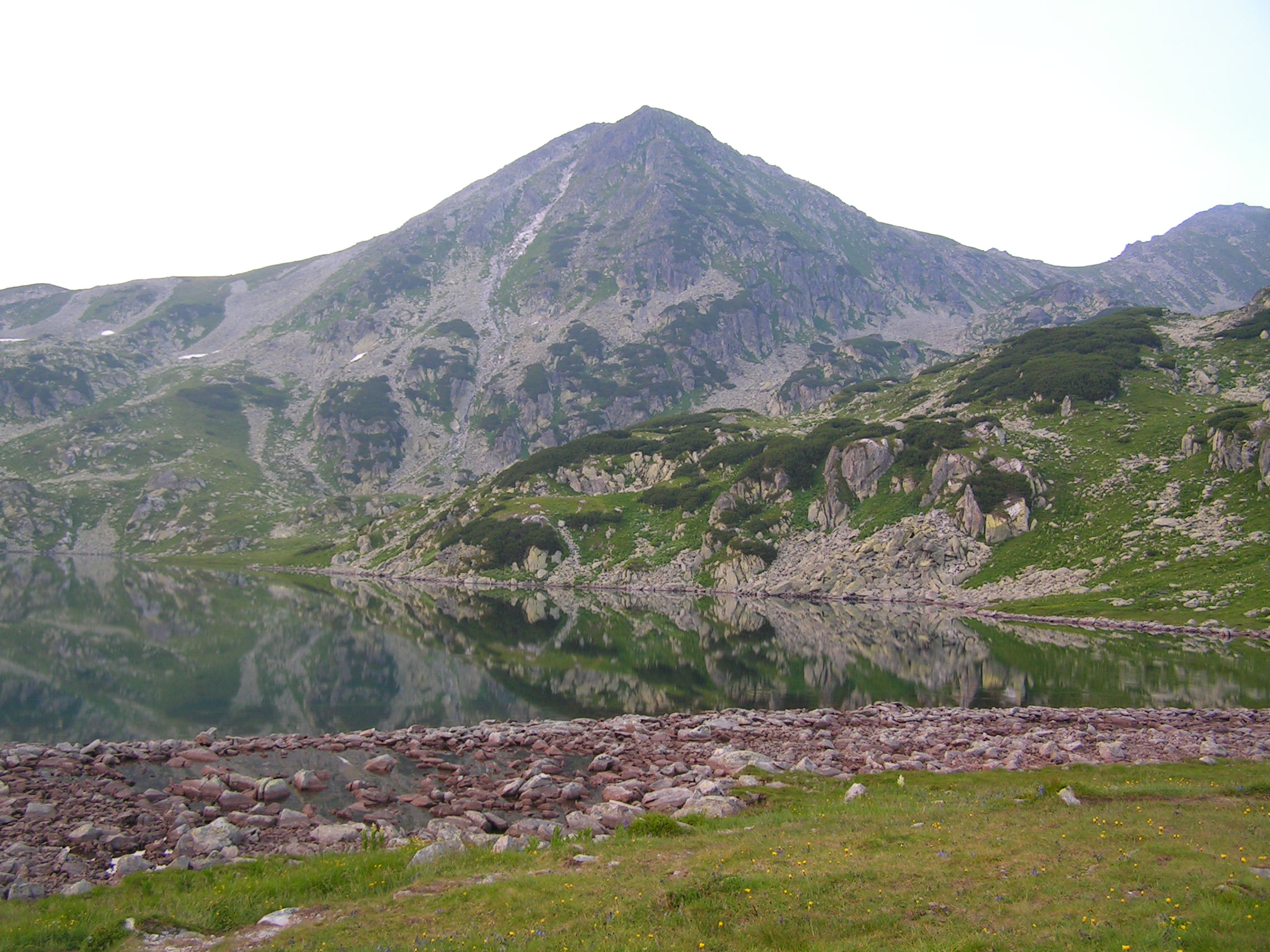
Bucura Lake, the largest glacial lake in Romania

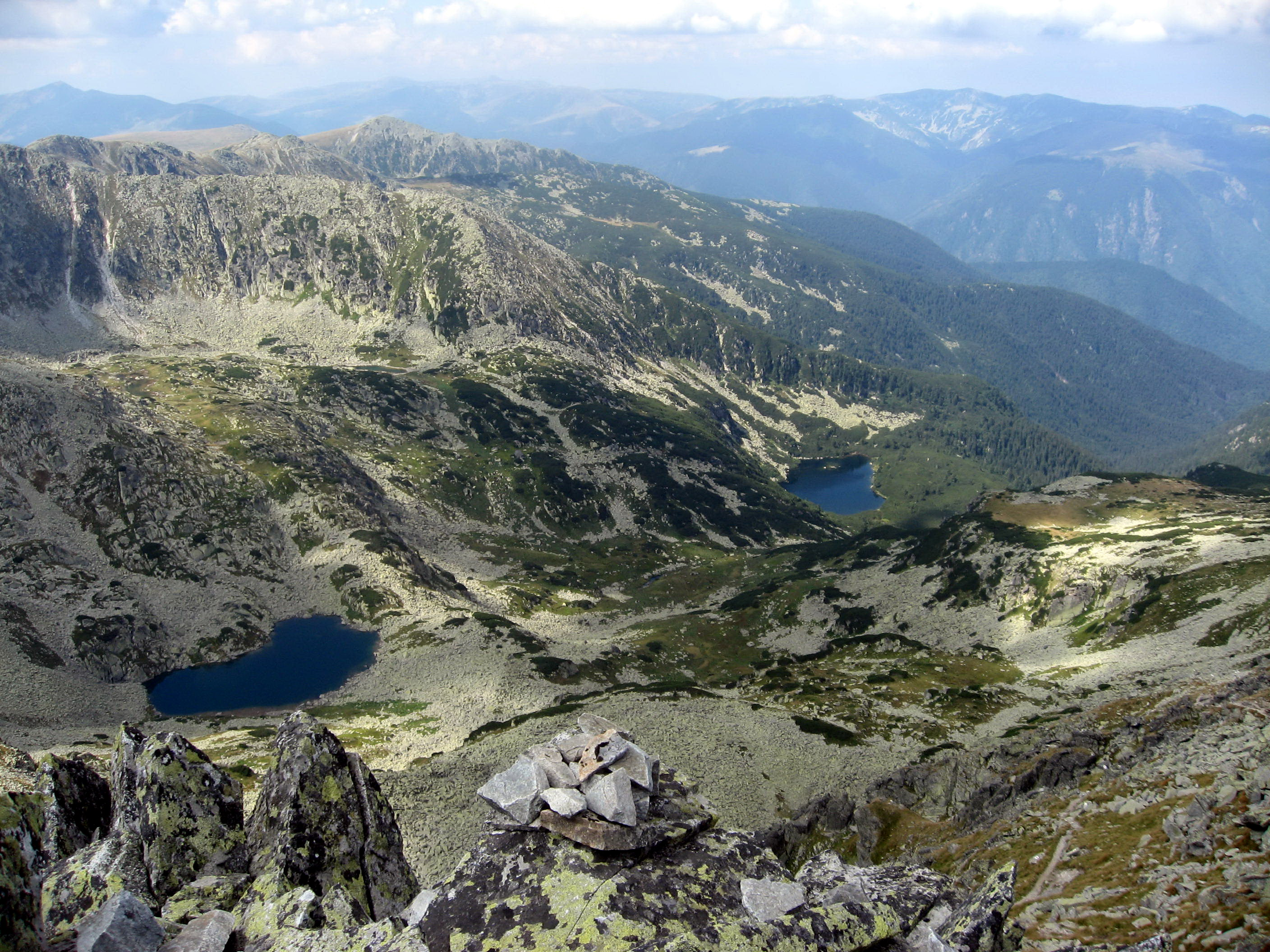
Glacial lakes in the Retezat Mountains

The Retezat–Godeanu mountain group is a subgroup of mountains in the Southern Carpathians, Romania. It is named after the highest mountains in the group, the Retezat Mountains.

== Boundaries ==
The Retezat–Godeanu group of mountains is bounded:

- in the east, by the Jiu River;
- in the west, by the Timiș-Cerna Gap (the Cerna River and the Timiș River);
- in the north, by the Bistra River and the Hațeg depression.

== Mountains ==
- Retezat Mountains (Munții Retezat; literally: Hewed Mountains)
- Godeanu Mountains (Munții Godeanu)
- Vâlcan Mountains (Munții Vâlcan)
- Mehedinți Mountains (Munții Mehendinţi)
- Cerna Mountains (Munții Cernei)
- Țarcu Mountains (Munții Țarcu; literally: Pen Mountains)

== See also ==
- Carpathian Mountains
- Parâng Mountains group
