= Mehedinți Mountains =

Mountain Range in Romania

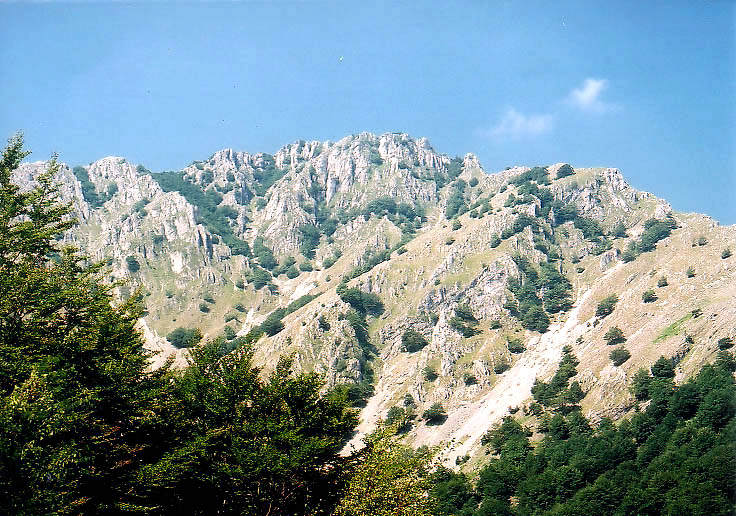
Vârful lui Stan

The Mehedinți Mountains (Romanian: Munții Mehedinți) are a mountain range in southwestern Romania, part of the Retezat-Godeanu Mountains group.

The range represents the highest relief form in Mehedinți County, with an average height of 1100-1200 meters. The tallest peak is Vârful lui Stan, which reaches 1466 meters.
