= Padeș =

- Commune
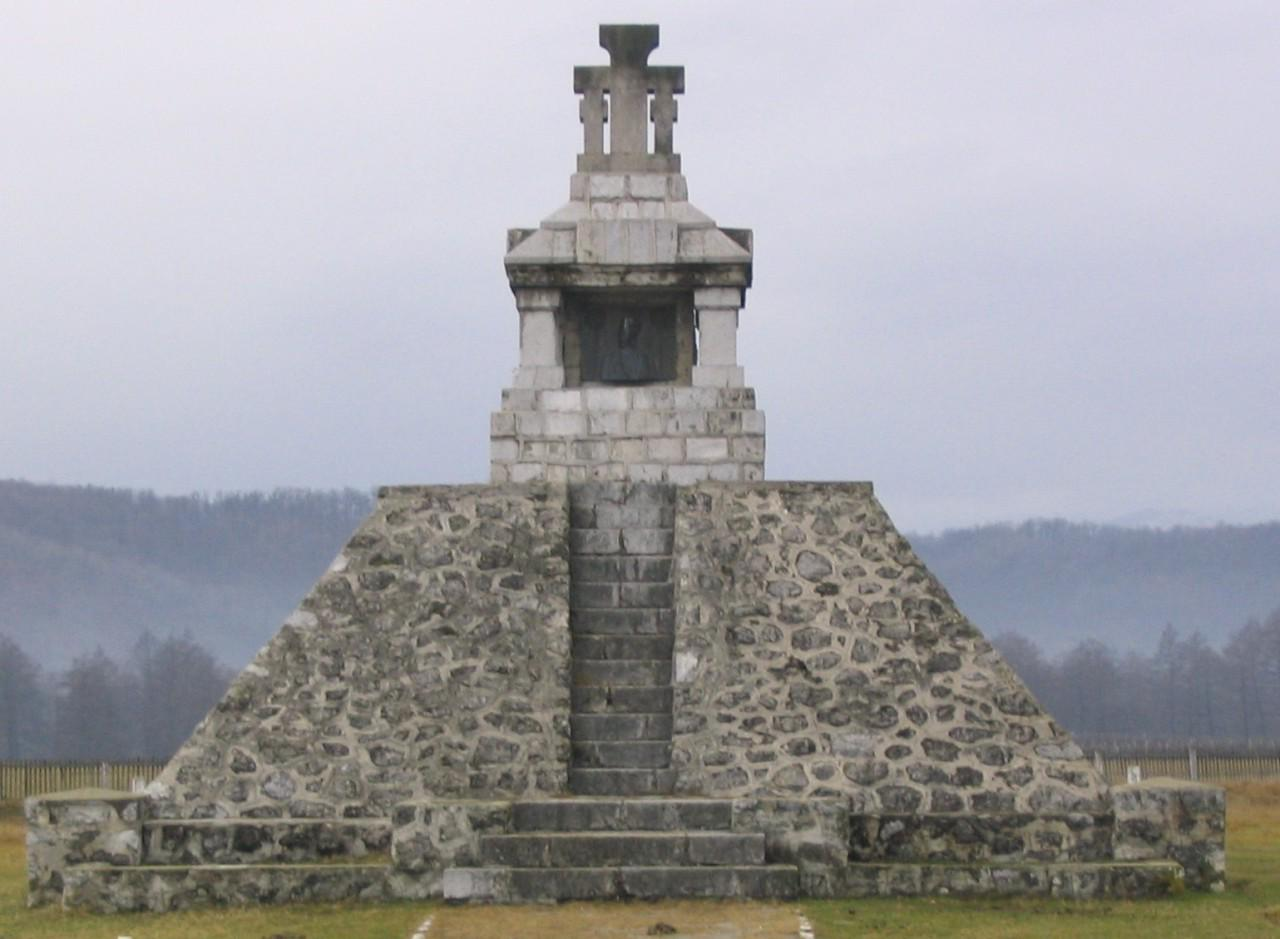
- The Wallachian uprising of 1821 Monument

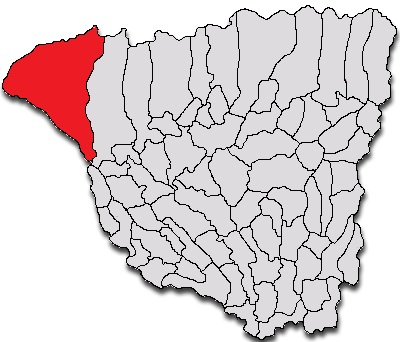
- Location in Gorj County

- Location in Romania
- Coordinates: 45°01′N 22°51′E
- Country: Romania
- County: Gorj
- Subdivisions: Apa Neagră, Călugareni, Cerna-Sat, Cloșani, Motru-Sec, Orzești, Padeș, Văieni

Government
  - Mayor (2020–2024): Mihăiță-Gabriel Troacă (PSD)
- Area: 389.81 km^{2} (150.51 sq mi)
- Population (2021-12-01): 4,632
  - Density: 11.88/km^{2} (30.78/sq mi)
- Time zone: UTC+02:00 (EET)
  - Summer (DST): UTC+03:00 (EEST)
- Vehicle reg.: GJ

Padeș is a commune in Gorj County, Oltenia, Romania. It is composed of eight villages: Apa Neagră, Călugareni (the commune center), Cerna-Sat, Cloșani, Motru-Sec, Orzești, Padeș and Văieni.
