= Cerna (Danube) =

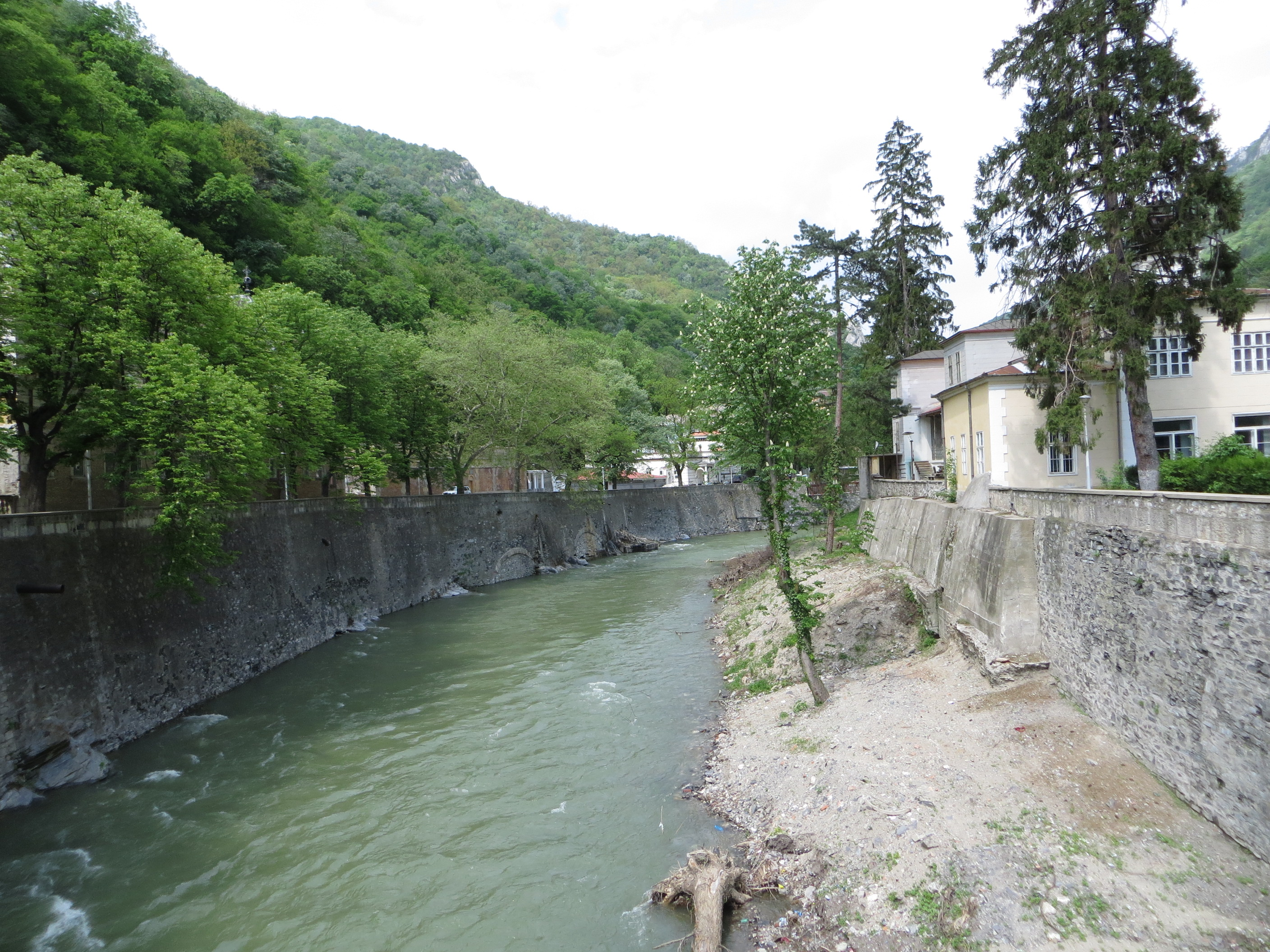

- Location within Romania

Location
- Country: Romania
- Counties: Gorj, Caraș-Severin, Mehedinți
- Towns: Băile Herculane, Orșova

Physical characteristics
- Source: Godeanu Mountains
- Mouth: Danube
  - location: Orșova
  - coordinates: 44°44′22″N 22°24′44″E
- Length: 79 km (49 mi)
- Basin size: 1,380 km^{2} (530 sq mi)

Basin features
- Progression: Danube→ Black Sea
- Tributaries
  - right: Belareca

The Cerna (Hungarian: Cserna) is a river in Romania, a left tributary of the river Danube. The Cerna has its source on the south-east side of the Godeanu Mountains and flows into the Danube near the town Orșova. The upper reach of the river is sometimes called Cernișoara. With a length of 79 km (49 mi) and its basin of 1,380 km^{2} (530 sq mi), it carves an erosive tectonic valley with numerous gorges, quite deep sometimes. There is a man-made lake on it (Tierna), just before it crosses the Băile Herculane spa, to perpetuate the old toponymic od Dierna. The upper course of the Cerna is part of the Domogled-Valea Cernei National Park. The Cerna flows through the villages and towns Cerna-Sat, Țațu, Băile Herculane, Pecinișca, Bârza, Topleț, Coramnic and Orșova.

The Valea lui Iovan-Cerna dam is located on the Cerna at its confluence with the river Valea lui Iovan. The Valea lui Iovan reservoir has a maximum volume of 124 million m^{3} and an area of 292 ha.

The Herculane Dam is the second important barrier obstructing the waters of the Cerna River. It is located 7 km upstream from Băile Herculane, has a volume of 15.8 million m^{3}, a retention level NNR of 235 m above sea level, and an area of 75.2 ha.

The Cornereva Dam is located on the main tributary of the Cerna, Belareca (with a discharge of 6.24 m³/s) approximately 5 km upstream from the village of Cornereva.

At the end of its journey, the Cerna flows into the Danube at Orșova via a large bay. This bay was formed when the Danube entered the Cerna's mouth following the construction of the Iron Gates I dam, which caused water levels to rise.

== Tributaries ==
The most important tributary of the Cerna is the Belareca. The following rivers are tributaries of the river Cerna (from source to mouth):

- Left: Arsaca, Jelerău, Valea Mare
- Right: Șturu, Măneasa, Valea Cărbunelui, Valea lui Iovan, Balmez, Naiba, Olanul, Craiova, Iauna, Topenia, Iuta, Prisăcina, Belareca, Jardașița Mare, Sacherștița

The Cerna has several other (minor) tributaries and subtributaries. These include, from north to south: Scurtu, Gârdomanu, Turcineasa, Bulzu, Mocirliu (upstream from the Valea lui Iovan reservoir), Curmezișa, Minocu, Râmnuța, Bedina, Țăsna, Ogașu lui Roșeț, Slatina, Ogașu Ursului, Șaua Padina, Clepeniac, Munk, Valea Mare, Padina Soroniște, Prolaz, Ferigari, Bârzoni and Pecinișca (near Băile Herculane).

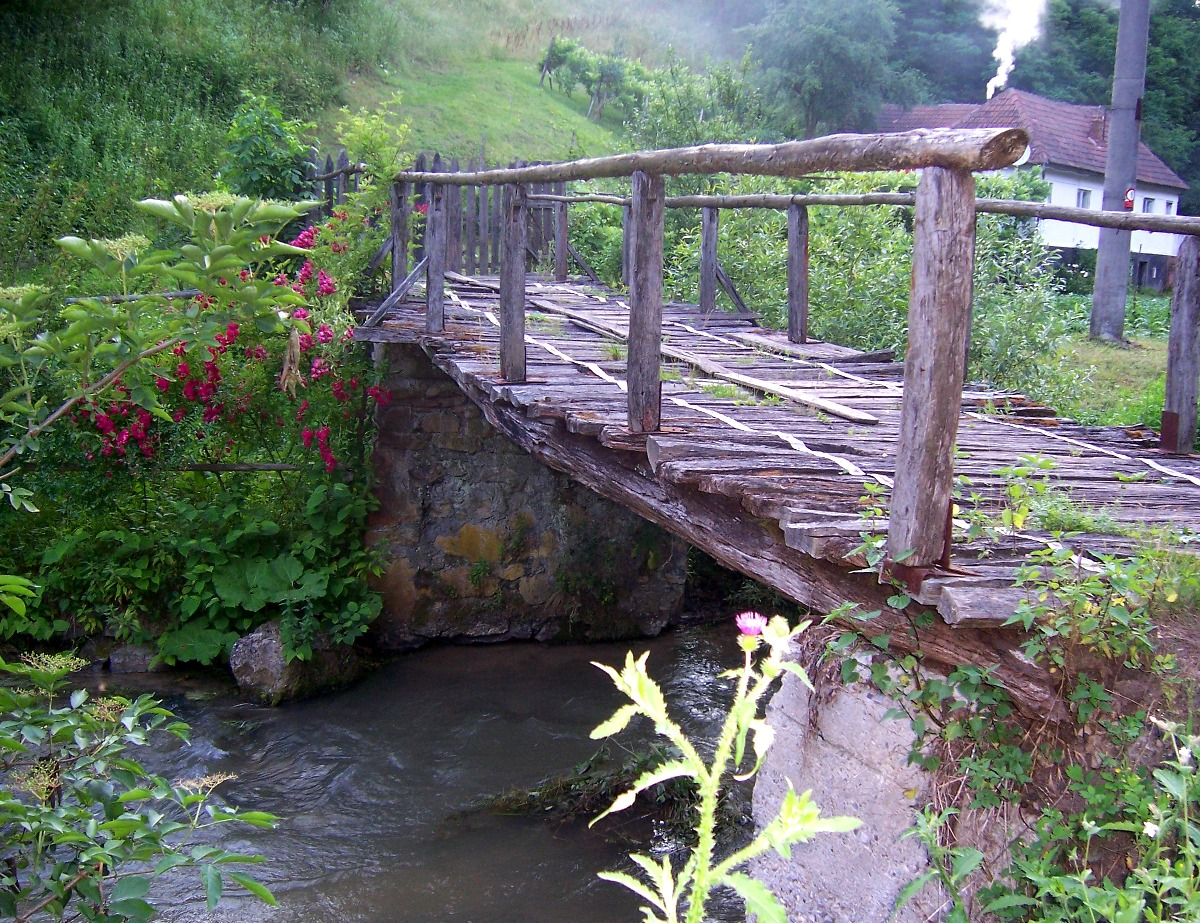
Bridge over the Cerna river
