= Băile Herculane =

- Town
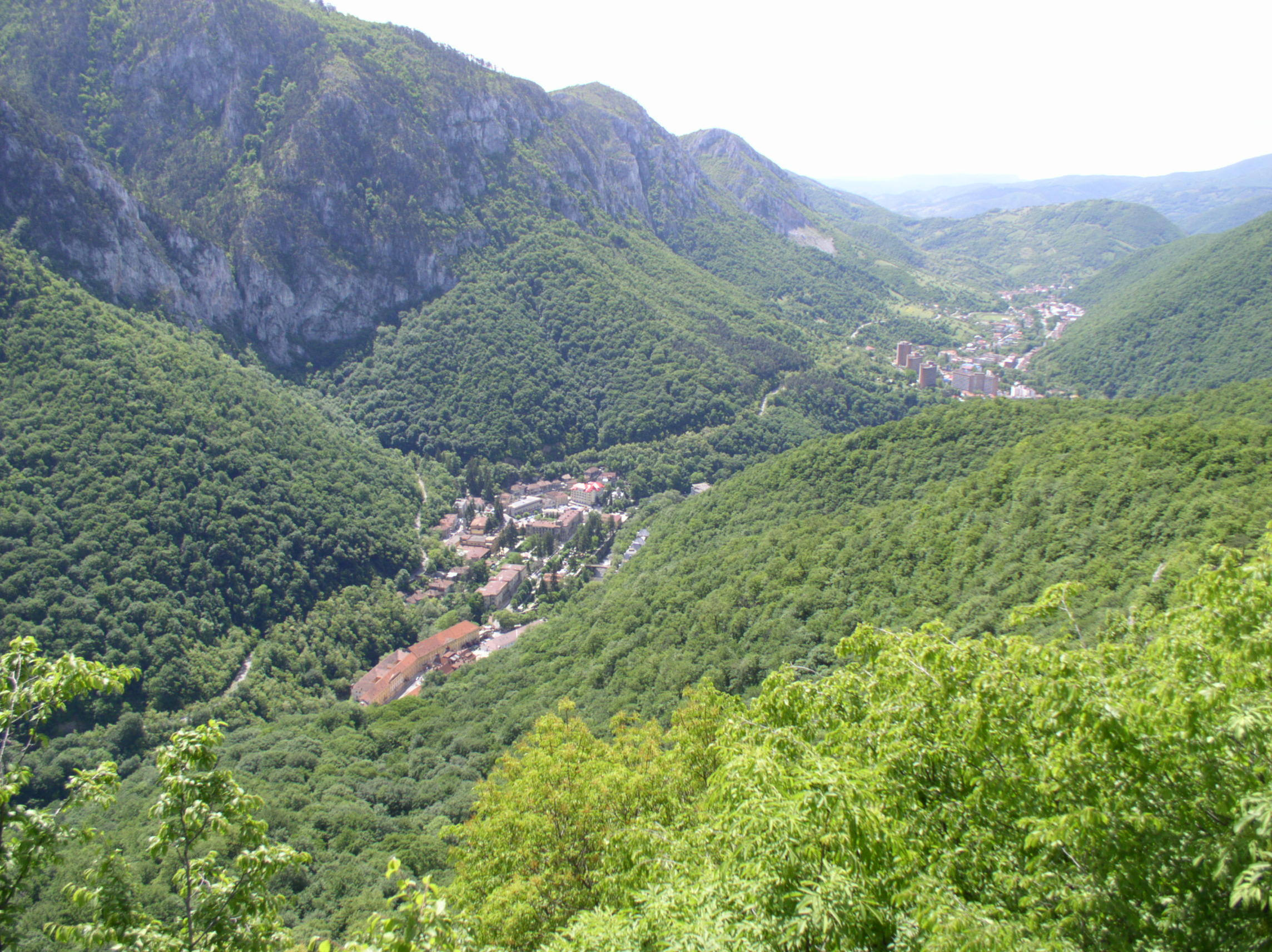
- Băile Herculane seen from a mountaintop

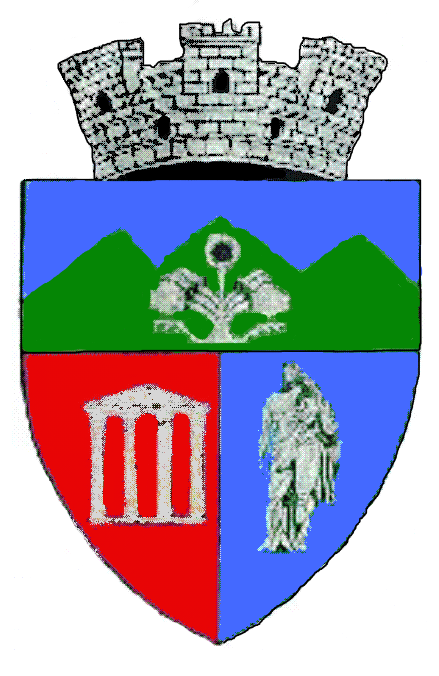
- Coat of arms

- Location in Caraș-Severin County

- Location in Romania
- Coordinates: 44°52′43″N 22°24′51″E
- Country: Romania
- County: Caraș-Severin

Government
  - Mayor (2024–2028): Gheorghe Orza (PSD)
- Area: 105.48 km^{2} (40.73 sq mi)
- Elevation: 168 m (551 ft)
- Population (2021-12-01): 3,787
  - Density: 35.90/km^{2} (92.99/sq mi)
- Time zone: UTC+02:00 (EET)
  - Summer (DST): UTC+03:00 (EEST)
- Postal code: 325200
- Area code: (+40) 02 55
- Vehicle reg.: CS
- Website: www.primaria-baileherculane.ro

Băile Herculane (Latin: Aqua Herculis; German: Herkulesbad; Hungarian: Herkulesfürdő; Czech: Herkulovy Lázně, Turkish: Lazarethane, English: Herculean Baths) is a spa town in Romanian Banat, in Caraș-Severin County, situated in the valley of the Cerna River, between the Mehedinți Mountains to the east and the Cerna Mountains to the west, elevation 168 m (551 ft). Its current population is 3,787. The town administers one village, Pecinișca (Hungarian: Pecsenyeska; from 1912 to 1918 Csernabesenyő).

== History ==
The spa town of Băile Herculane has a long history of human habitation. Numerous archaeological discoveries show that the area has been inhabited since the Paleolithic era. The Peștera Hoților (Cave of the Thieves), contains multiple levels, including one from the Mousterian period, one from the Mesolithic period (late Epigravettian) and several from the later Neolithic periods.

The Romans established the town of Ad Aquas Herculis based on the legend that the weary Hercules stopped in the valley to bathe and rest. Unearthed stone carvings show that visiting Roman aristocrats turned the town into a Roman leisure centre. Six statues of Hercules from the time have been discovered. A bronze replica of one of them, molded in 1874, stands as a landmark in the town centre.

Roman baths, mapped in 1774, became the thermal spring now known as Hygea's Spring, had an area of 667 m^{2} with 11 rooms. In the middle of the building was a circular pool of 5 m diameter with steps descending to the pool floor. There was another rectangular pool with sides of 8 x 4.2 m. On the steep Cerna bank the Romans built another five buildings around thermal springs.

The ruins of the amphitheatre were 43 m from the left bank of the river. It had an outer diameter of 47.4 m. The Austrian architects took the massive ruins into account in order to create a rectangular park with terraces which still exists today in the centre.

Austrian and Ottoman troops clashed here after the Ottoman victory in the battle of Mehadia on 30 August 1788. The Ottomans won the skirmish, took the town on 7 September 1788 and advanced to Caransebeș. It was retaken by the Austrians at the end of September 1789.

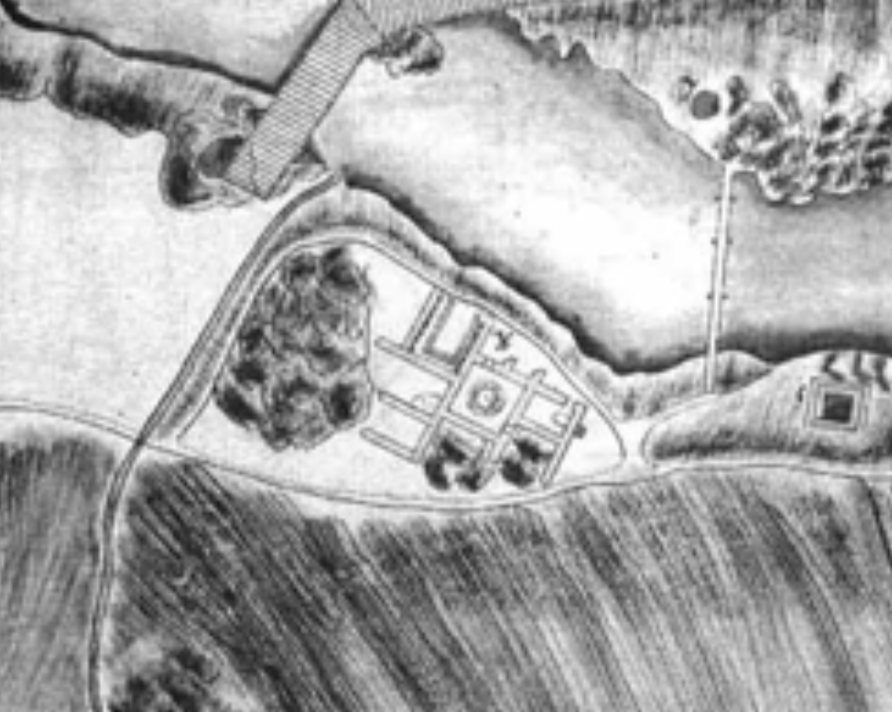
Roman baths from 1774

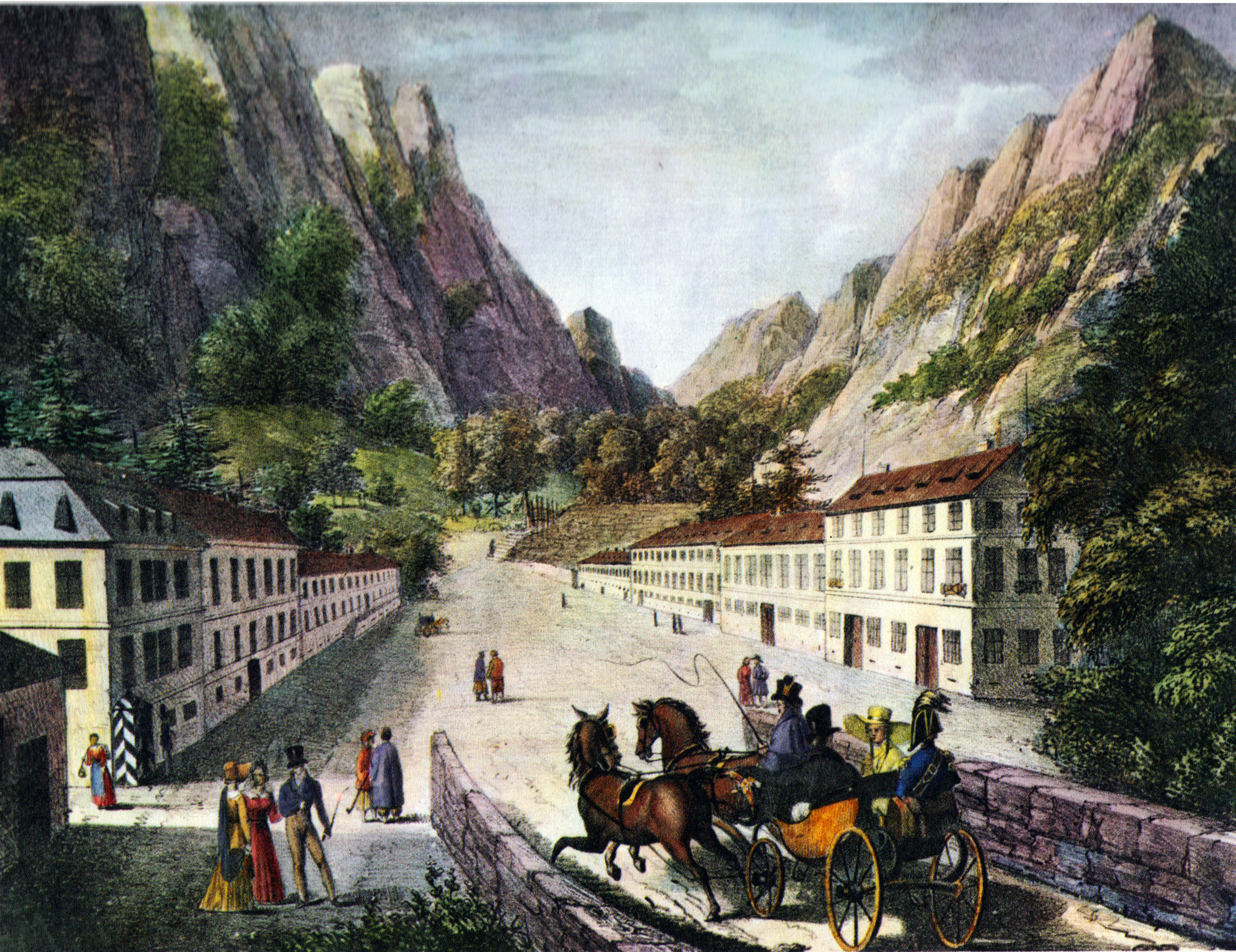
The town in 1824

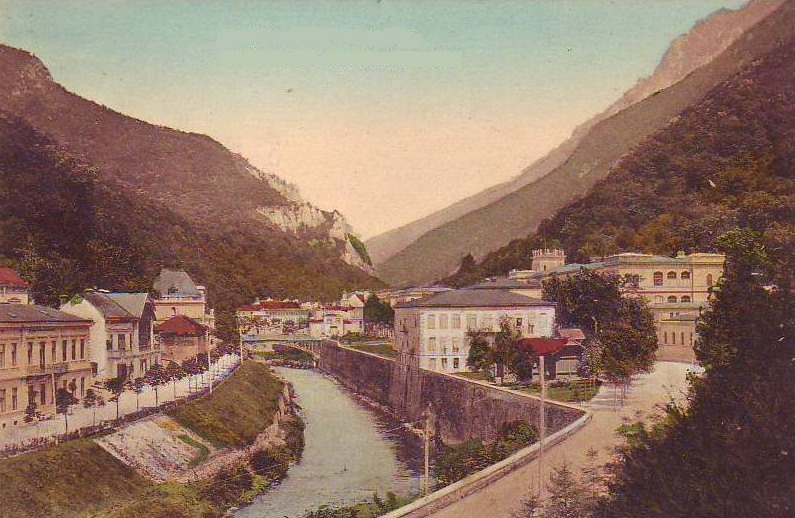
The town around 1900

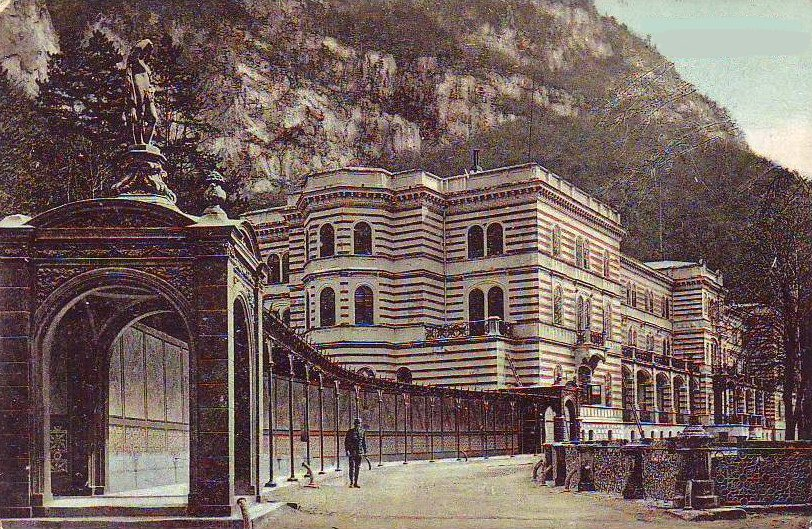
The town around 1900

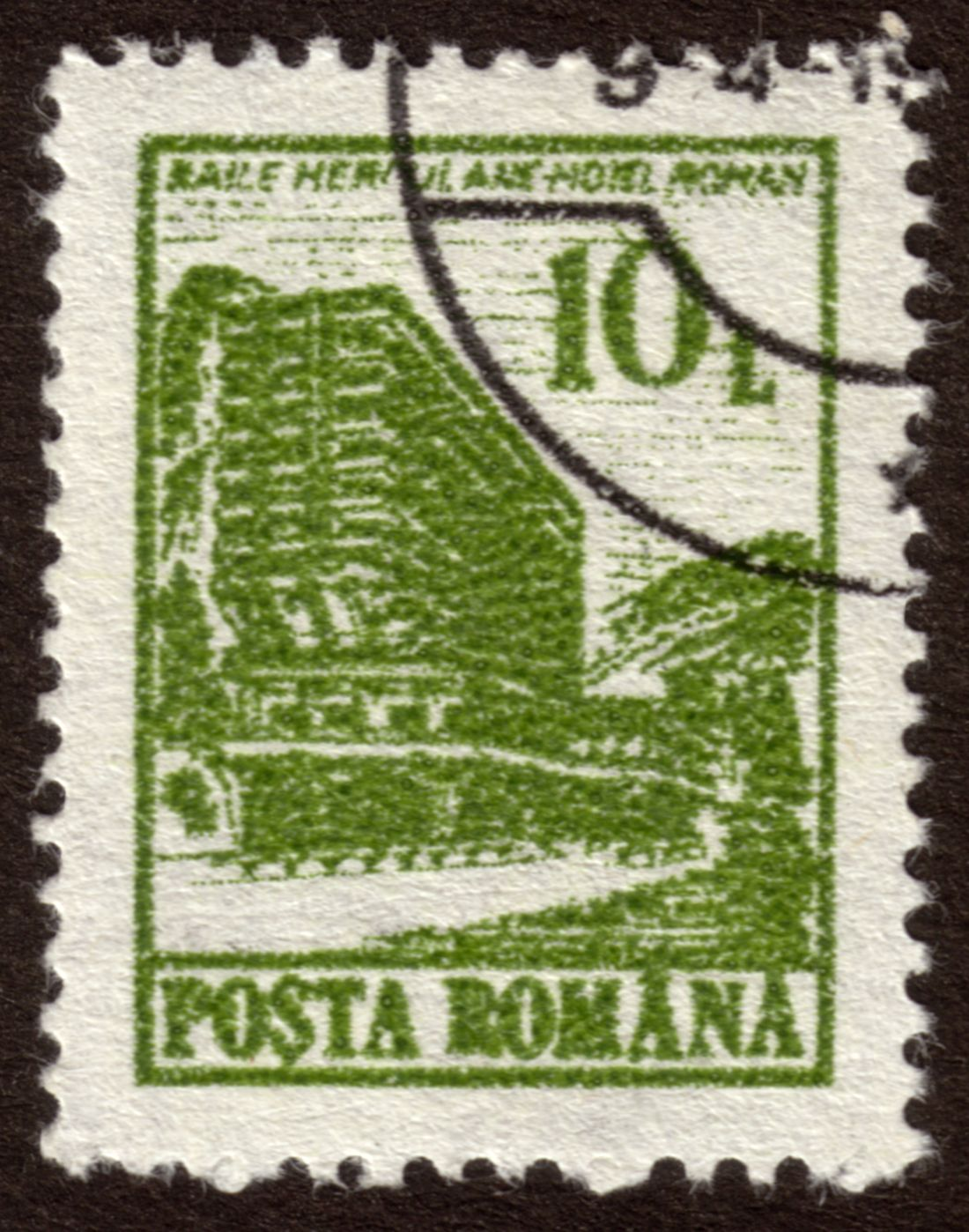
Romanian stamp of the Hotel Roman

== Climate ==
Băile Herculane has a humid continental climate (Dfb in the Köppen climate classification.

Climate data for Băile Herculane
Month	Jan	Feb	Mar	Apr	May	Jun	Jul	Aug	Sep	Oct	Nov	Dec	Year
Mean daily maximum °C (°F)	4.0 (39.2)	6.0 (42.8)	11.0 (51.8)	17.0 (62.6)	22.0 (71.6)	26.0 (78.8)	29.0 (84.2)	29.0 (84.2)	23.0 (73.4)	17.0 (62.6)	10.0 (50.0)	5.0 (41.0)	16.6 (61.9)
Daily mean °C (°F)	0.5 (32.9)	2.0 (35.6)	6.0 (42.8)	12.0 (53.6)	16.0 (60.8)	20.0 (68.0)	22.5 (72.5)	22.5 (72.5)	17.5 (63.5)	12.0 (53.6)	6.5 (43.7)	2.0 (35.6)	11.6 (52.9)
Mean daily minimum °C (°F)	−3.0 (26.6)	−2.0 (28.4)	1.0 (33.8)	6.0 (42.8)	10.0 (50.0)	14.0 (57.2)	16.0 (60.8)	16.0 (60.8)	12.0 (53.6)	6.0 (42.8)	3.0 (37.4)	−1.0 (30.2)	6.5 (43.7)
Average precipitation mm (inches)	70 (2.8)	66 (2.6)	76 (3.0)	98 (3.9)	116 (4.6)	110 (4.3)	94 (3.7)	75 (3.0)	79 (3.1)	74 (2.9)	75 (3.0)	81 (3.2)	1,014 (40.1)
Source: meteoblue

== Demography ==
According to the 2021 census, the population of the town of Băile Herculane amounts to 3,787 inhabitants, a decrease compared to the previous census in 2011, when 5,008 inhabitants were recorded. The majority of residents are Romanians (83.81%), with a Roma minority (1.66%), while for 13.97% the ethnic affiliation is unknown. From a religious standpoint, most residents are Orthodox (82.31%), with a Roman Catholic minority (1.85%), and for 14.47% the religious affiliation is unknown.

Ethnic composition of the city of Băile Herculane
1. Romanians (83.8%)
2. Roma (1.66%)
3. Other ethnic groups (0.55%)
4. Unknown (14.0%)

Historical population
Year	Pop.	±%
1956	1,656	—
1966	2,456	+48.3%
1977	3,835	+56.1%
1992	6,340	+65.3%
2002	6,051	−4.6%
2011	5,008	−17.2%
2021	3,787	−24.4%
Source: Census data

Religious composition of the city of Băile Herculane
1. Orthodox (82.3%)
2. Roman-Catholic (1.85%)
3. Other religions (1.37%)
4. Unknown (14.5%)

== The modern spa ==
In modern times, the spa town has been visited for its supposedly natural healing properties: hot springs with sulfur, chlorine, sodium, calcium, magnesium and other minerals, as well as negatively ionized air. Before World War II, when the first modern hotel was built (i.e. H Cerna, 1930) it remained a popular destination with Western Europeans. During the Communist era, mass tourism facilities were built, such as the 8- to 12-storied concrete hotels Roman, Hercules A, Hercules B, Afrodita, Minerva, Diana, UGSR, etc. which dominate the skyline. It was visited by all kinds of people but was especially popular with employees and retirees, who would spend their state-allotted vacation vouchers there, hoping to improve their health. Today, they share the town with a younger crowd.

Treatment options include: aerosol therapy; massage; electrotherapy; kinesiotherapy (medical rehabilitation programs); thermal baths in an outdoor pool (with steam); balneotherapy with sulfurous and saline waters; mofettes and mineral water drinking cure; thermotherapy facilities with saunas; hydrokinesitherapy in pools and swimming areas; balneotherapy (sapropelic mud and paraffin wraps); reflexology; cryotherapy; acupuncture, and other procedures. The facilities available at this resort allow for the treatment of rickets, rheumatism, and osteoporosis; the alleviation of cardiovascular and arthritic conditions, as well as neurological, dermatological, or pediatric ailments.

From the resort, there are excursions to the Domogled-Cheile Carașului and Cheile Nerei-Beușnița nature reserves, the Bigăr and Beușnița waterfalls, Comarnic Cave, Iron Gates Natural Park, the Banat Sphinx, Lacul Dracului ( Devil’s Lake), Ochiul Beiului Lake, the Banat Semmering, and many other attractions in the area.

New privately owned pensions and hotels appeared after 1989, along the Cerna/Tiena river banks, spread from the train station to the end of the hydroelectric dam. Some of the Austro-Hungarian-era buildings have become derelict, including many of the baths, because of bad management after privatization. In the late 2010s, an NGO called the Herculane Project was established to stabilise the buildings and eventually restore them.

== Natives ==
- Friedrich von Martini (1833–1897), Swiss engineer, designer of the Martini–Henry rifle
- Vasile Didea (born 1954), Romanian boxer
- Ferenc Szécsi (1913–1974), Hungarian stage and film actor

== Image gallery ==
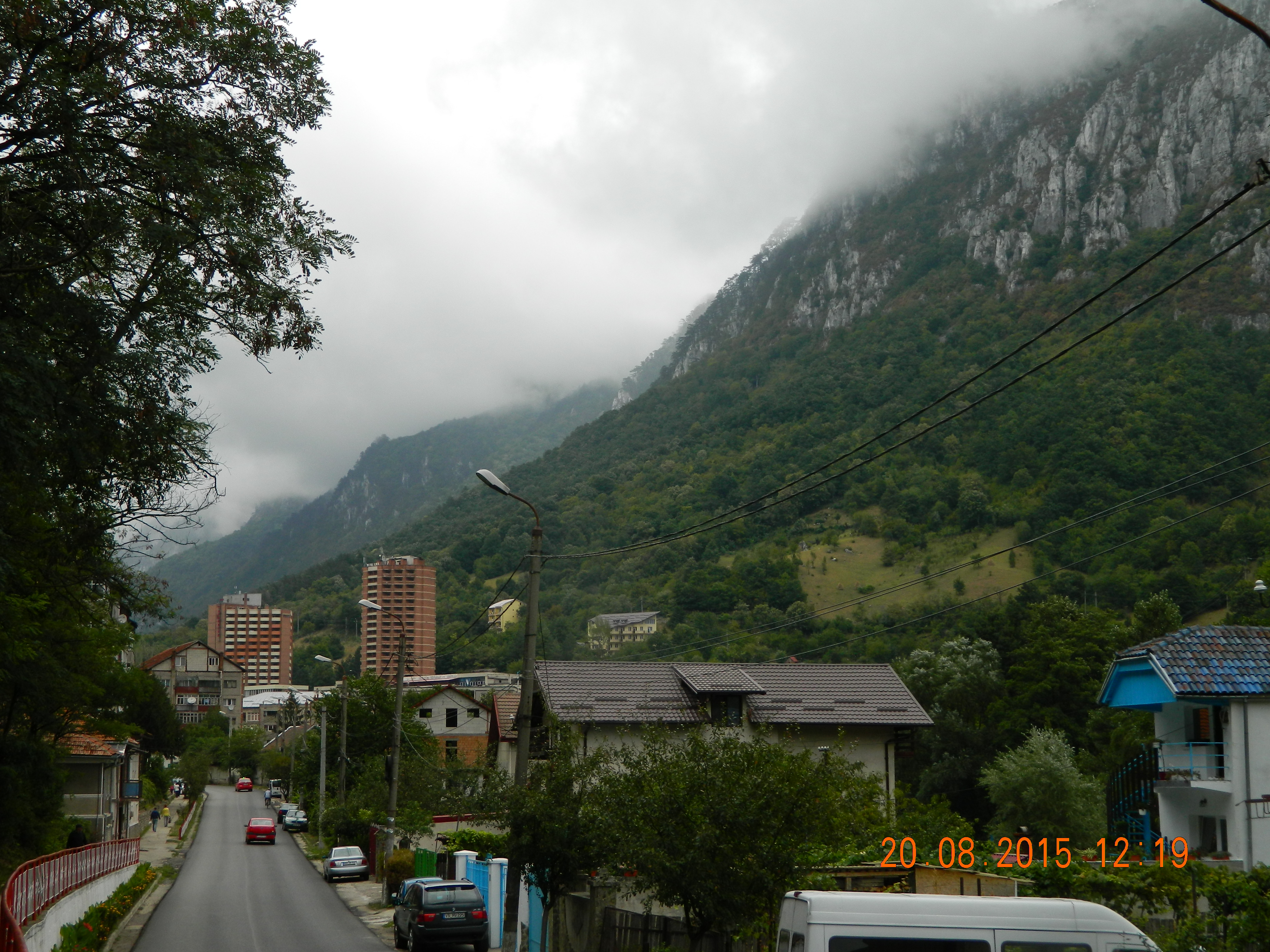
Main road going into the resort

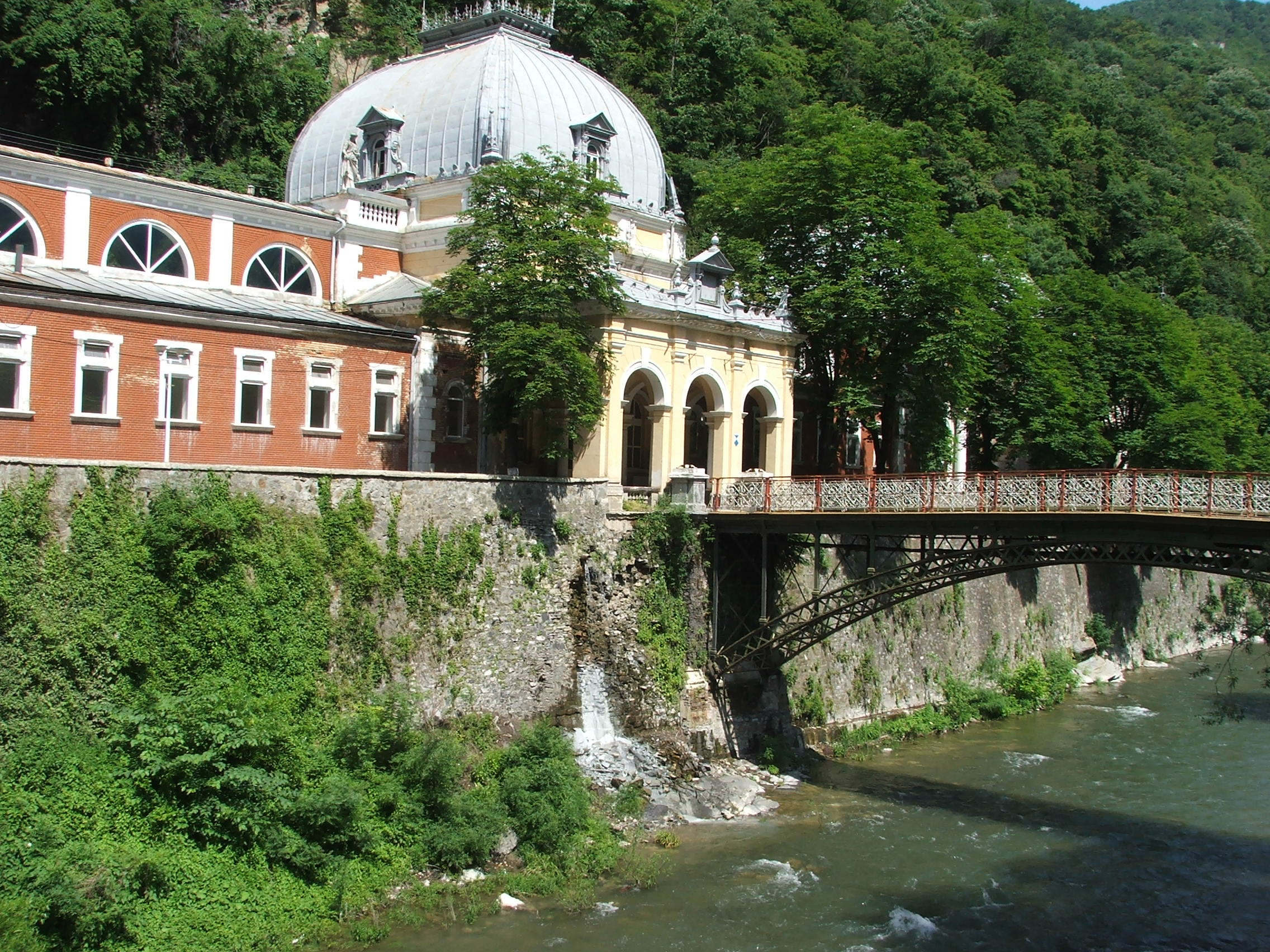
Spa

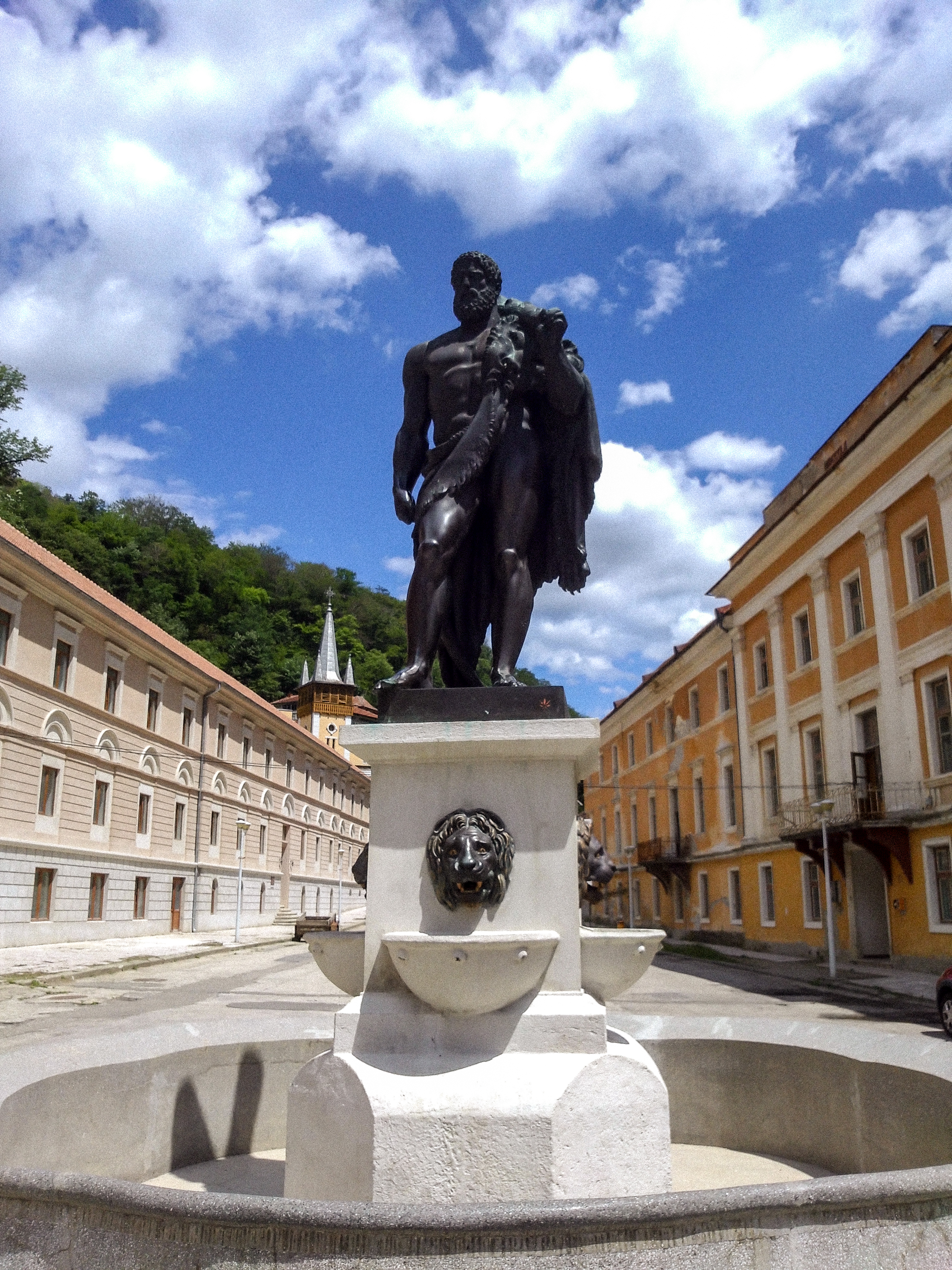
Statue of Hercules

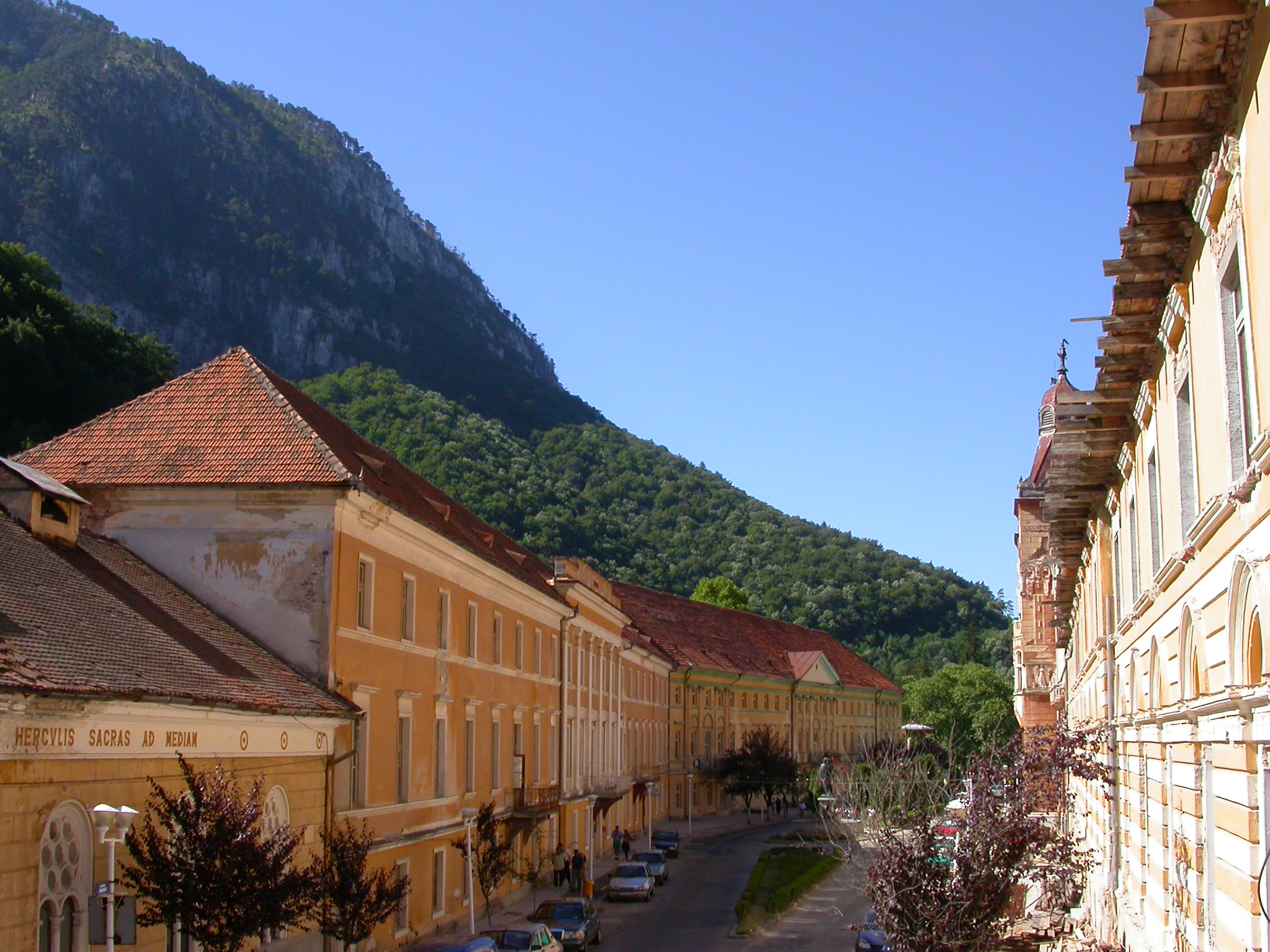
Hercules Square

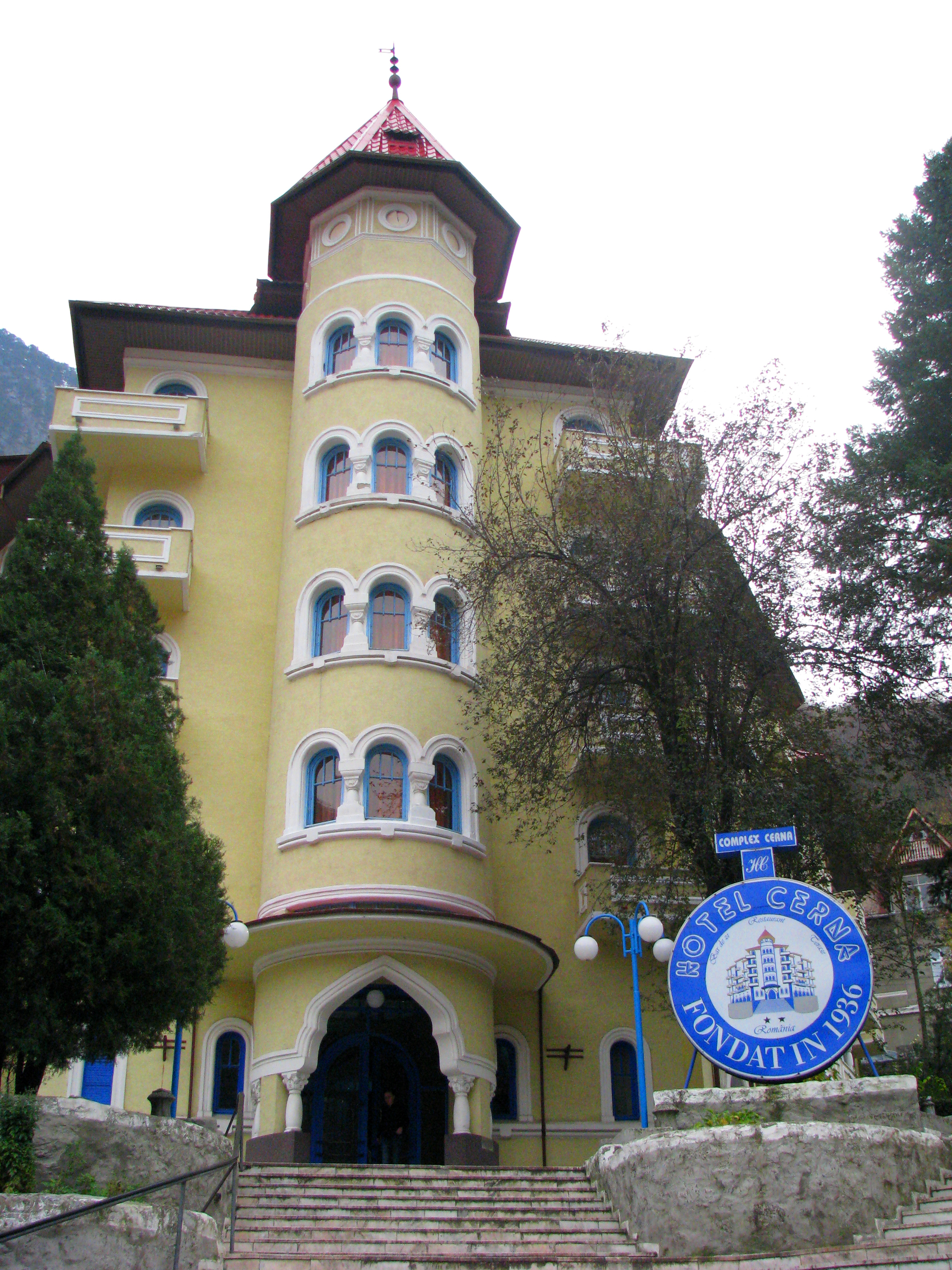
Cerna Hotel, founded in 1936

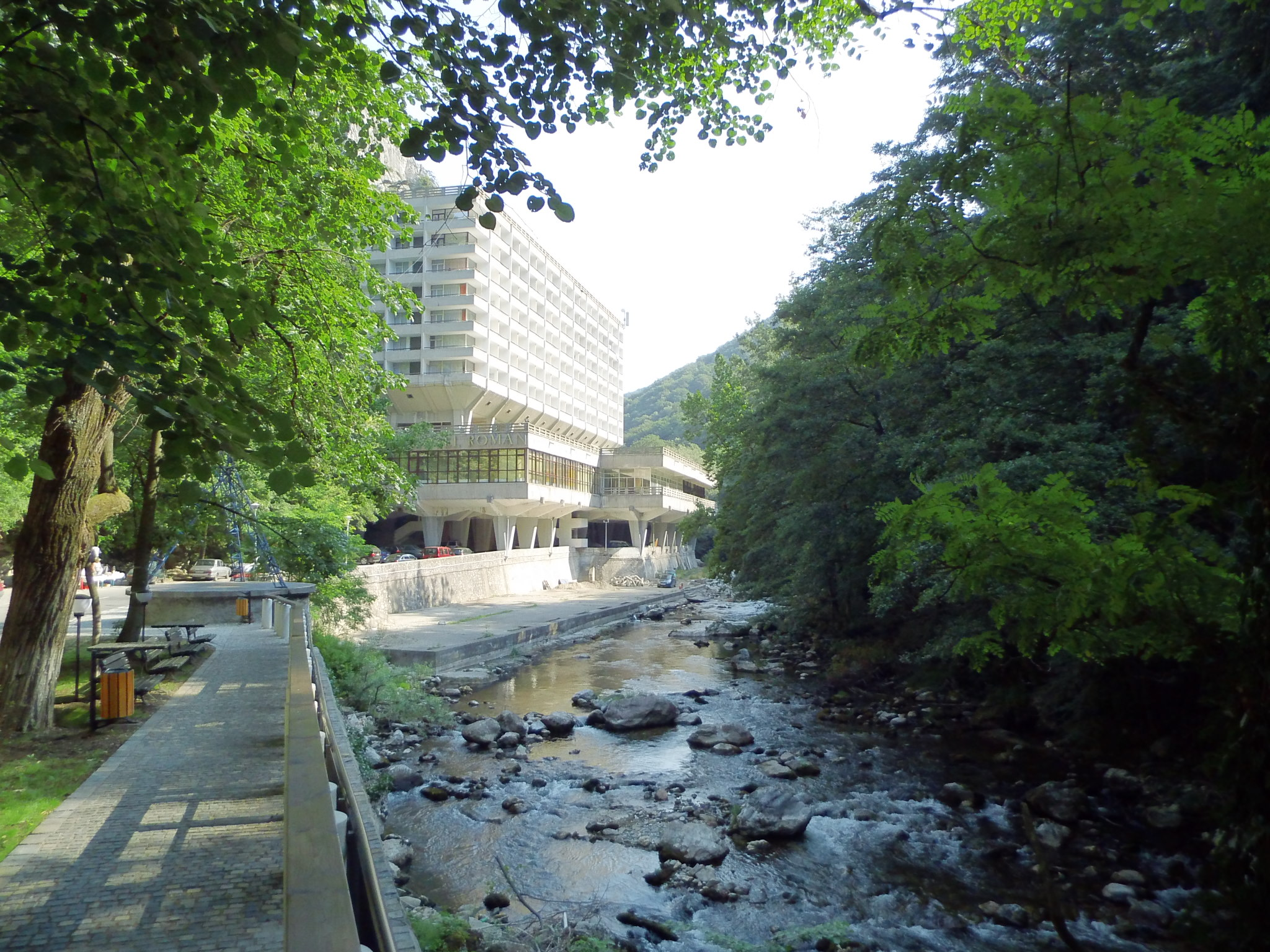
Roman Hotel

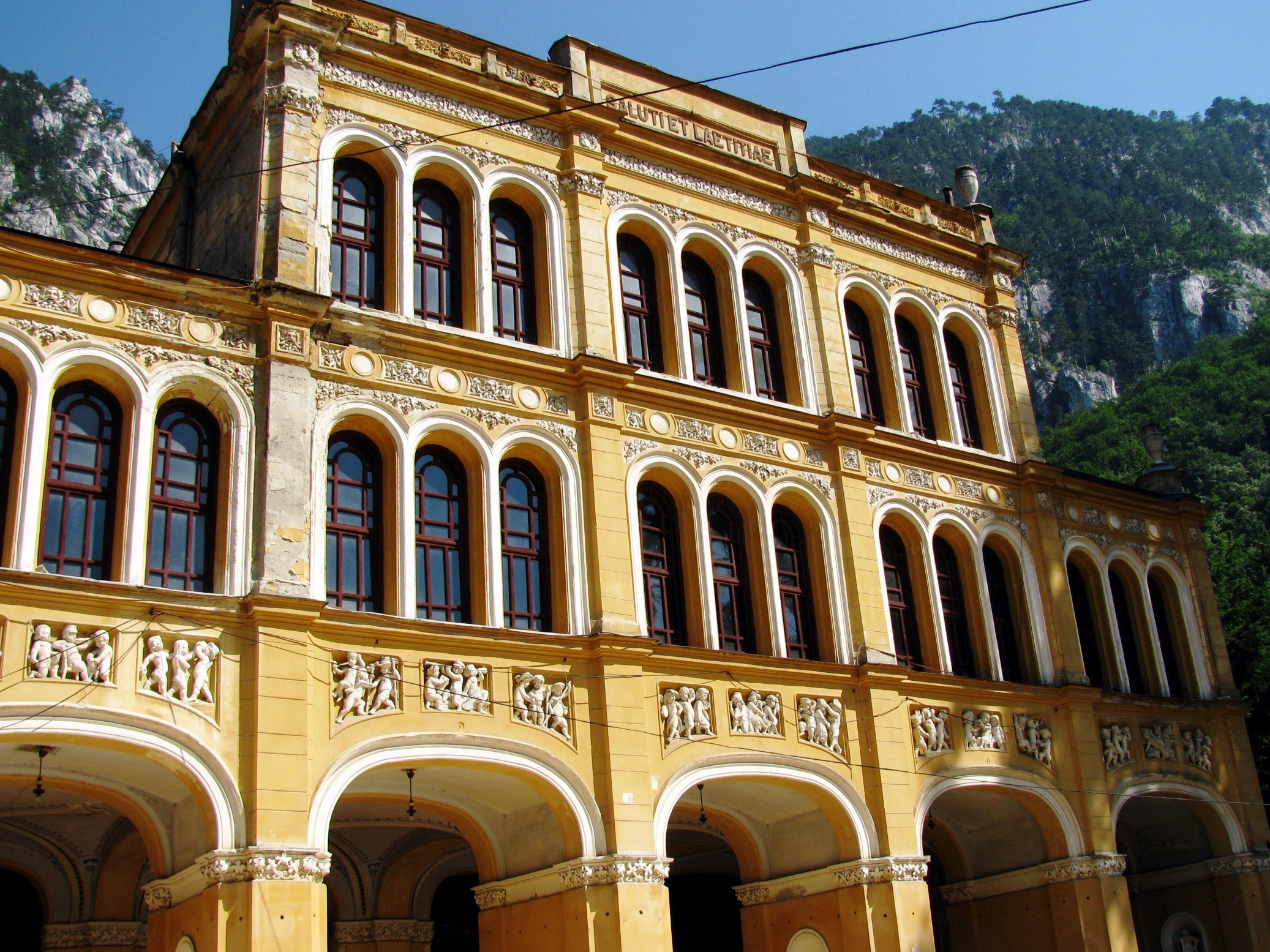
The Casino

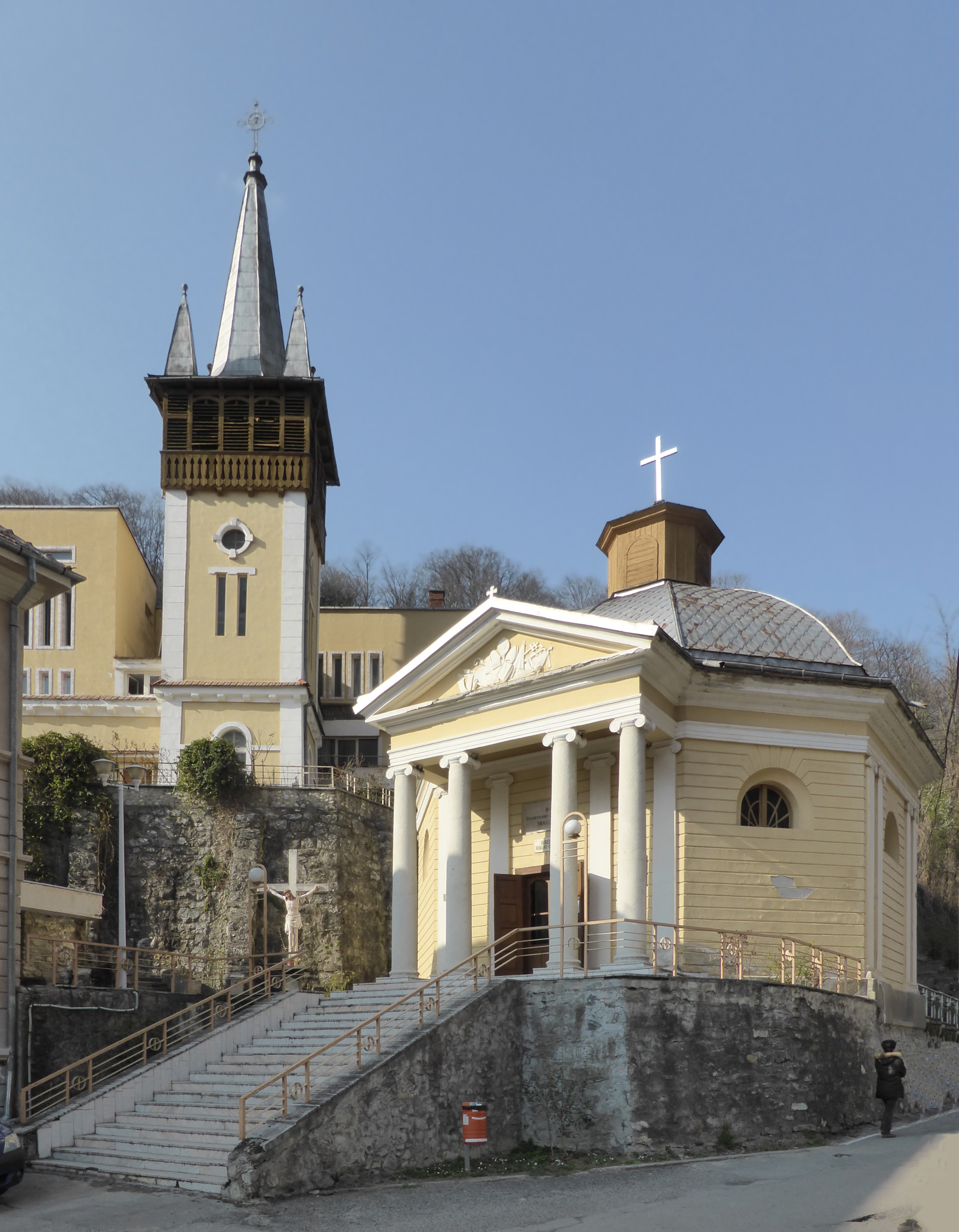
Roman-Catholic Church

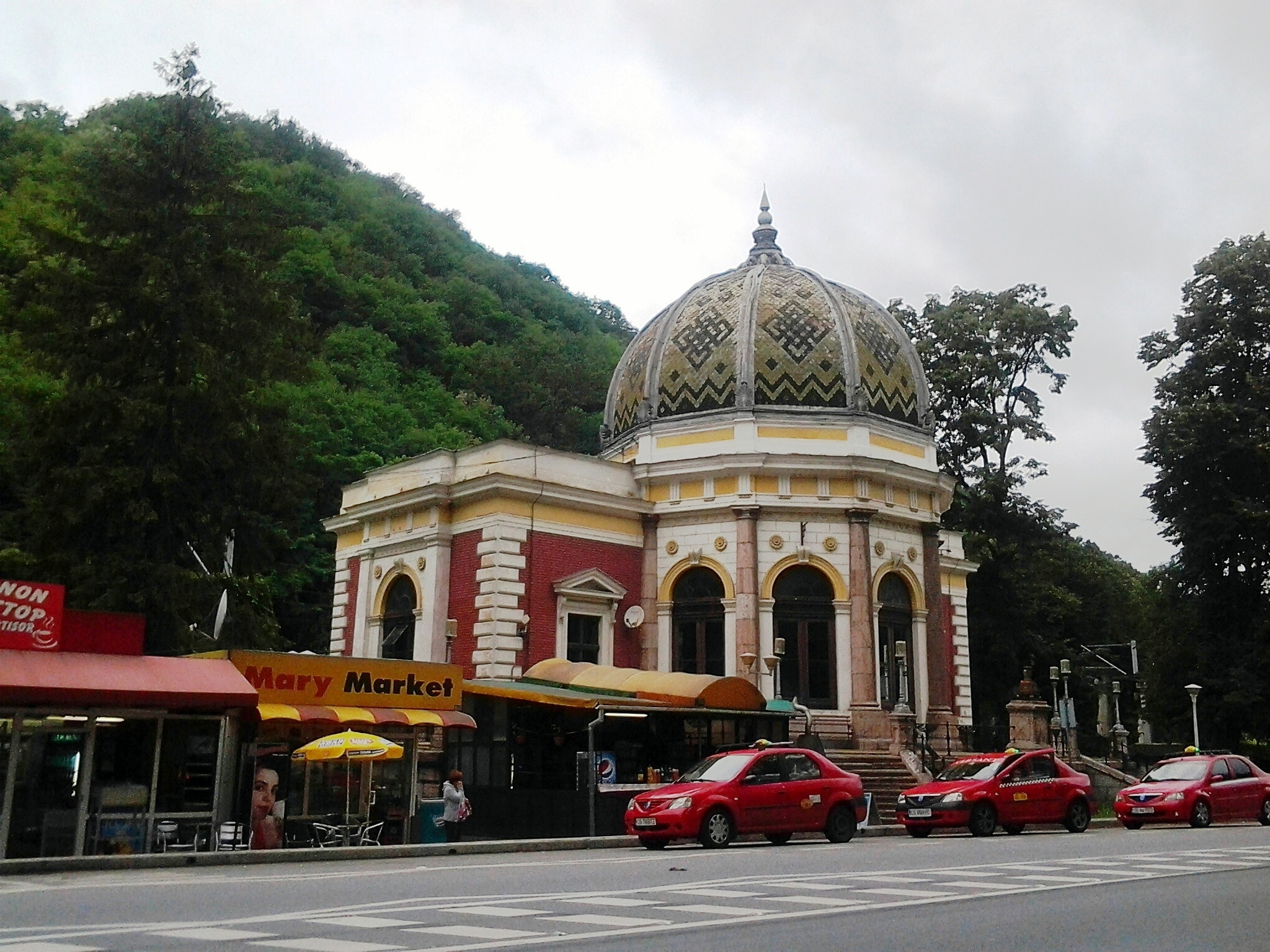
Railway station

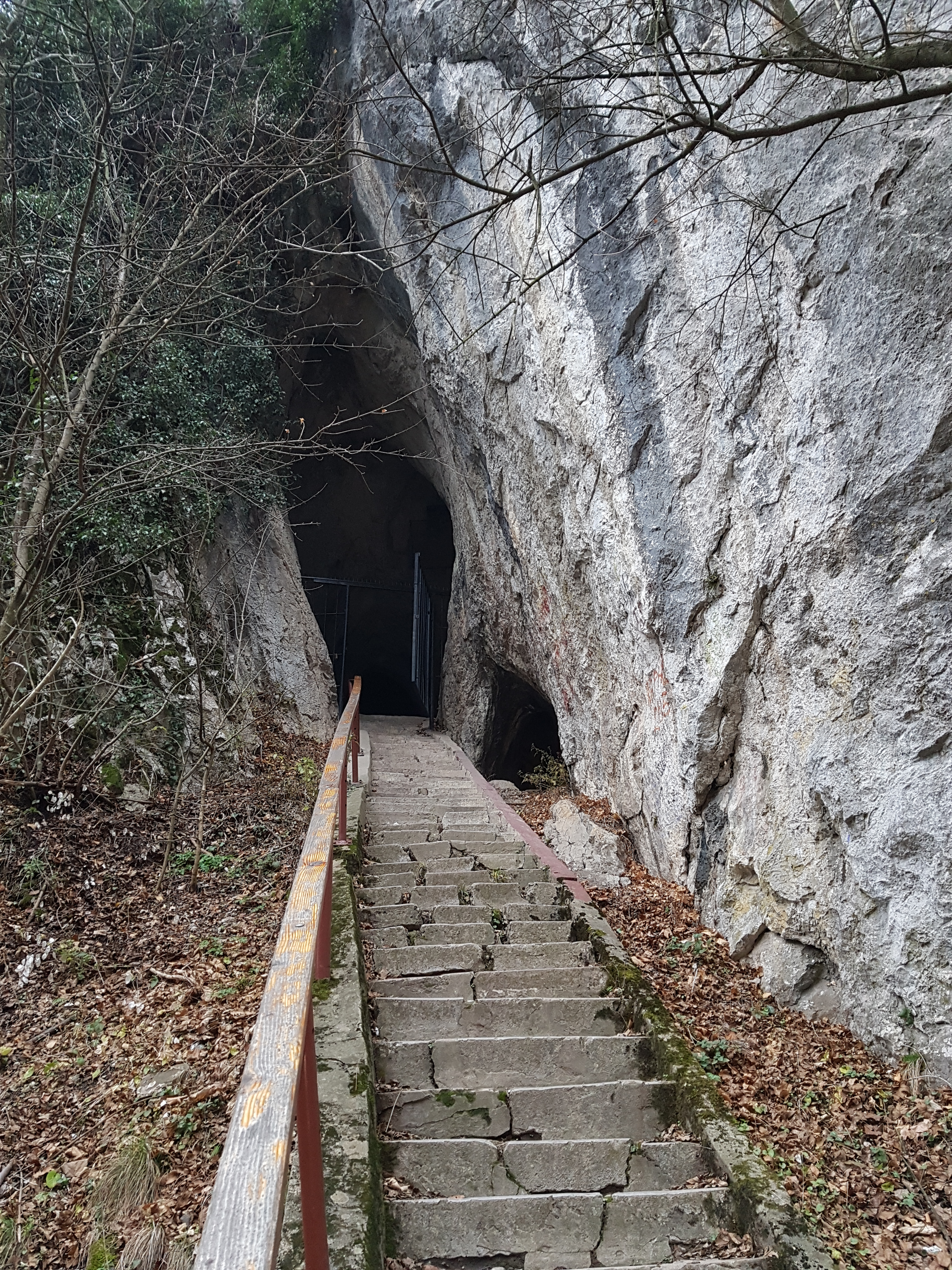
Entrance to a nearby cave
