= Topleț =

- Commune
- Topleț village

- Coat of arms

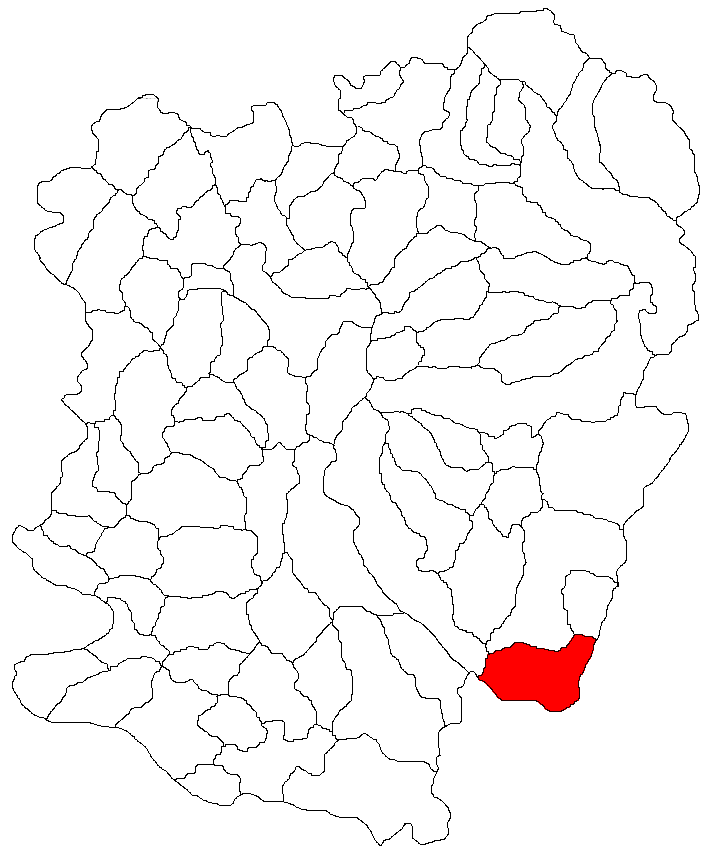
- Location in Caraș-Severin County

- Location in Romania
- Coordinates: 44°48′N 22°24′E
- Country: Romania
- County: Caraș-Severin

Government
  - Mayor (2024–2028): Ion Blidaru (PSD)
- Area: 93.06 km^{2} (35.93 sq mi)
- Elevation: 99 m (325 ft)
- Population (2021-12-01): 2,246
  - Density: 24.13/km^{2} (62.51/sq mi)
- Time zone: UTC+02:00 (EET)
  - Summer (DST): UTC+03:00 (EEST)
- Postal code: 327400
- Area code: (+40) 02 55
- Vehicle reg.: CS
- Website: www.primaria-toplet.ro

Topleț (Hungarian: Toplec) is a commune in Caraș-Severin County, western Romania with a population of 2,246 as of 2021. It is composed of two villages, Bârza (Börza) and Topleț.

== Natives ==
- Ioan Talpeș (born 1944), general, military historian, and politician
