= Cornereva =

- Commune
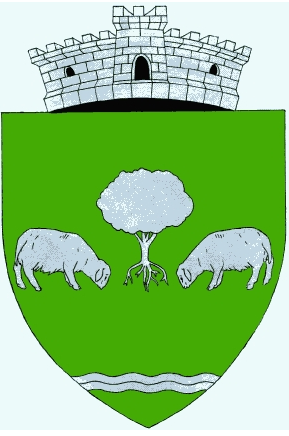
- Coat of arms

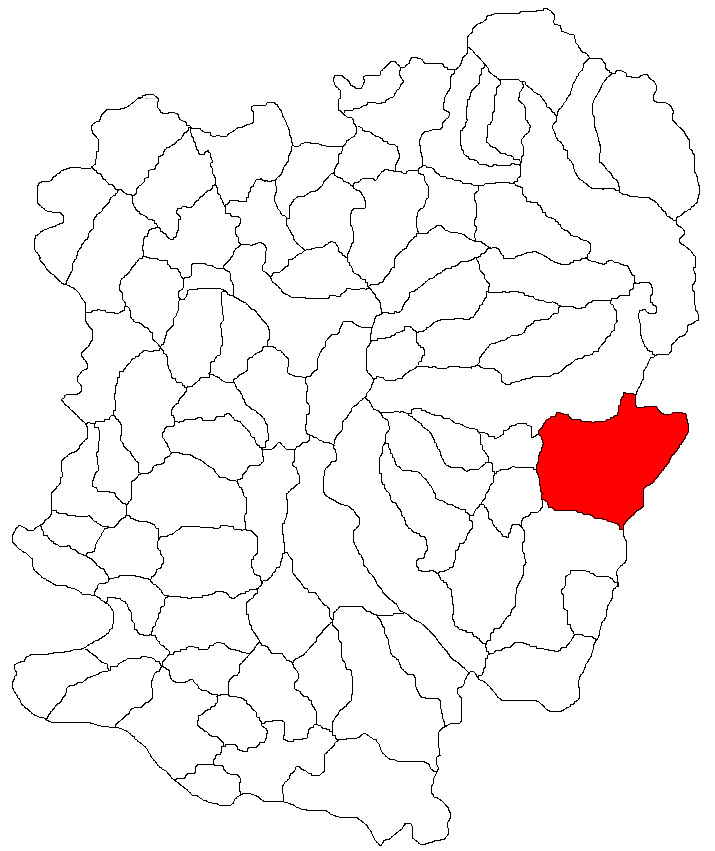
- Location in Caraș-Severin County

- Location in Romania
- Coordinates: 45°04′N 22°25′E
- Country: Romania
- County: Caraș-Severin

Government
  - Mayor (2024–2028): Nicolae Novăcescu (PSD)
- Area: 261.04 km^{2} (100.79 sq mi)
- Elevation: 700 m (2,300 ft)
- Highest elevation: 1,800 m (5,900 ft)
- Lowest elevation: 436 m (1,430 ft)
- Population (2021-12-01): 2,707
  - Density: 10.37/km^{2} (26.86/sq mi)
- Time zone: UTC+02:00 (EET)
  - Summer (DST): UTC+03:00 (EEST)
- Postal code: 327110
- Area code: +(40) 02 55
- Vehicle reg.: CS
- Website: www.comunacornerevacs.ro

Cornereva (Hungarian: Somosréve) is a commune in Caraș-Severin County, western Romania with a population of 2,707 inhabitants as of 2021. It is composed of forty villages: Arsuri, Bogâltin (Bogoltény), Bojia, Borugi, Camena (Kamenavölgy), Cireșel, Costiș, Cozia, Cracu Mare, Cracu Teiului, Cornereva, Dobraia, Dolina, Gruni (Grúny), Hora Mare, Hora Mică, Ineleț (Inelec), Izvor, Lunca Florii, Lunca Zaicii, Mesteacăn, Negiudin, Obița, Pogara, Pogara de Sus, Poiana Lungă, Prisăcina, Prislop, Ruștin, Scărișoara, Strugasca, Studena, Sub Crâng, Sub Plai, Topla (Topla), Țațu, Zănogi, Zbegu, Zmogotin, and Zoina.

Historical population
| Year | Pop. | ±% |
|---|---|---|
| 1880 | 5,884 | — |
| 1910 | 6,105 | +3.8% |
| 1930 | 5,360 | −12.2% |
| 1977 | 4,387 | −18.2% |
| 2002 | 3,403 | −22.4% |
| 2011 | 3,190 | −6.3% |
| 2021 | 2,707 | −15.1% |
Source: Census data

According to the 2002 census, the commune had a population of 3,403; of those, 99.97% of the population were ethnic Romanians, and 99.9% were Romanian Orthodox. At the 2021 census, the population had decreased to 2,707, of which 97.19% were Romanians and 97.04% Romanian Orthodox.
