= Plesi =

Plesi or Pleşi may refer to:

- Pleşi, a village in Săsciori commune, Romania
- Pleşi, a village in Bisoca commune, Romania
- Plesi (Goražde), a village in Bosnia and Herzegovina

== See also ==
- Pleșa (disambiguation)
- Pleașa (disambiguation)
- Pleșoiu (disambiguation)
