= Spaia =

- Location within Romania

Location
- Country: Romania
- Counties: Timiș County
- Villages: Zgribești, Sălbăgel

Physical characteristics
- Mouth: Timiș
  - location: Gavojdia
  - coordinates: 45.6266°N 22.0351°E
- Length: 17 km (11 mi)
- Basin size: 59 km^{2} (23 sq mi)

Basin features
- Progression: Timiș→ Danube→ Black Sea
- Tributaries
  - left: Sălbăgel
  - right: Slăveni

The Spaia is a left tributary of the river Timiș in Romania. It discharges into the Timiș in Gavojdia. Its length is 17 km (11 mi) and its basin size is 59 km^{2} (23 sq mi).
