= Știuca (disambiguation) =

Știuca may refer to the following places in Romania:

- Știuca, a commune in Timiș County
- Știuca, a tributary of the Olt in Harghita County
- Știuca (Timiș), a tributary of the Timiș in Timiș County
