= Golet =

Golet may refer to:

- Goleț, a river in Romania
- Goleț, a village in Bucoșnița Commune, Caraș-Severin County, Romania
- Golleti, a village in Telgana, India
- Golett, a Pokémon species
