= Pleșești =

Pleşeşti may refer to several places in Romania:

- Alexandru Vlahuţă, formerly called Pleşeşti, a commune in Vaslui County, Romania
- Pleşeşti, a village in Albac Commune, Alba County
- Pleşeşti, a village in Berca Commune, Buzău County
- Pleşeşti, a village in Podgoria Commune, Buzău County
- Pleşeşti, a village in Vultureşti Commune, Suceava County
- Pleşeşti, a village in Roșiile Commune, Vâlcea County
- Pleşeşti, a village in Boghești Commune, Vrancea County

== See also ==
- Pleșa (disambiguation)
- Pleși (disambiguation)
- Pleașa (disambiguation)
- Pleșoiu (disambiguation)
