= Bega Mică =

- Location within Romania

Location
- Country: Romania
- Counties: Timiș County
- Villages: Utvin, Diniaș, Sânmartinu Sârbesc, Ivanda

Physical characteristics
- Mouth: Timișaț
  - location: Iohanisfeld
  - coordinates: 45.5446°N 20.8767°E
- Length: 28 km (17 mi)
- Basin size: 201 km^{2} (78 sq mi)

Basin features
- Progression: Timișaț→ Timiș→ Danube→ Black Sea

The Bega Mică is a left tributary of the river Timișaț in Romania. It flows into the Timișaț near Iohanisfeld. Its length is 28 km (17 mi) and its basin size is 201 km^{2} (78 sq mi).
