= Vâna Mare (Timiș) =

- Location within Romania

Location
- Country: Romania
- Counties: Caraș-Severin, Timiș
- Villages: Sacu

Physical characteristics
- Mouth: Timiș
  - location: Jena
  - coordinates: 45.6091°N 22.0714°E
- Length: 14 km (8.7 mi)
- Basin size: 50 km^{2} (19 sq mi)

Basin features
- Progression: Timiș→ Danube→ Black Sea

The Vâna Mare is a left tributary of the river Timiș in Romania. It flows into the Timiș in Jena. Its length is 14 km (8.7 mi) and its basin size is 50 km^{2} (19 sq mi).
