= Cernabora =

Cernabora Scăiuș
- Location within Romania

Location
- Country: Romania
- Counties: Caraș-Severin, Timiș
- Villages: Scăiuș, Dragomirești, Oloșag

Physical characteristics
- Mouth: Timiș
  - location: near Lugoj
  - coordinates: 45.6798°N 21.9217°E
- Length: 26 km (16 mi)
- Basin size: 130 km^{2} (50 sq mi)

Basin features
- Progression: Timiș→ Danube→ Black Sea
- Tributaries
  - left: Sudriaș

The Cernabora (also: Scăiuș) is a left tributary of the Timiș in Romania. It flows into the Timiș near the city Lugoj. Its length is 26 km (16 mi) and its basin size is 130 km^{2} (50 sq mi).
