= Vâna Secănească =

Vâna Secănească Vâna Ohaba
- Location within Romania

Location
- Country: Romania
- Counties: Caraș-Severin County
- Villages: Ohaba-Mâtnic, Copăcele

Physical characteristics
- Mouth: Timiș
  - location: Sacu
  - coordinates: 45.5679°N 22.1382°E
- Length: 19 km (12 mi)
- Basin size: 61 km^{2} (24 sq mi)

Basin features
- Progression: Timiș→ Danube→ Black Sea
- Tributaries
  - right: Mâtnic

The Vâna Secănească or Vâna Ohaba is a left tributary of the river Timiș in Romania. It flows into the Timiș near Sacu. Its length is 19 km (12 mi) and its basin size is 61 km^{2} (24 sq mi).
