= Măcicaș =

- Location within Romania

Location
- Country: Romania
- Counties: Caraș-Severin County
- Villages: Rugi, Păltiniș, Zăgujeni, Prisaca

Physical characteristics
- Mouth: Timiș
  - location: Peștere
  - coordinates: 45.5247°N 22.1682°E
- Length: 26 km (16 mi)
- Basin size: 82 km^{2} (32 sq mi)

Basin features
- Progression: Timiș→ Danube→ Black Sea
- Tributaries
  - left: Toplița

The Măcicaș is a left tributary of the river Timiș in Romania. It discharges into the Timiș in Peștere. Its length is 26 km (16 mi) and its basin size is 82 km^{2} (32 sq mi).
