= Bolvașnița (river) =

- Location within Romania

Location
- Country: Romania
- Counties: Caraș-Severin County
- Villages: Vârciorova, Bolvașnița, Valea Timișului

Physical characteristics
- Source: Muntele Mic
- Mouth: Timiș
  - location: Valea Timișului
  - coordinates: 45.3444°N 22.2560°E
- Length: 18 km (11 mi)
- Basin size: 59 km^{2} (23 sq mi)

Basin features
- Progression: Timiș→ Danube→ Black Sea
- Tributaries
  - right: Bolvășnicioara

The Bolvașnița is a right tributary of the river Timiș in Romania. It discharges into the Timiș in Valea Timișului. Its length is 18 km (11 mi) and its basin size is 59 km^{2} (23 sq mi).
