= Teregova mine =

Open-pit mine in Romania

- Location: Teregova, Caraș-Severin County, Romania
- Products: Feldspar
- Production: 20,000 tonnes of feldspar
- Financial year: 2008

The Teregova mine is a large open pit mine in the western Romania in Caraș-Severin County, 85 km south-east of Reșița and 571 km north-west of the capital, Bucharest. Teregova represents one of the largest feldspar reserves in Romania having estimated reserves of 2,200,000 tonnes of ore.
