= Pârâieni oil field =

Oil field in Vâlcea County, Romania

Pârâieni
- Country: Romania
- Region: Vâlcea County
- Offshore/onshore: onshore
- Operator: Petrom

Field history
- Discovery: 2007
- Start of development: 2007
- Start of production: 2008

Production
- Current production of oil: 120 barrels per day (~6,000 t/a)
- Estimated oil in place: 1.4 million tonnes (~ 2×10^{6} m^{3} or 10 million bbl)

The Pârâieni oil field is an oil field located in Livezi, Vâlcea County. It was discovered in 2007 and developed by Petrom. It began production in 2008 and produces oil. The total proven reserves of the Pârâieni oil field are around 10 million barrels (1.4 million tonnes), and production is centered on 120 barrels per day (19 m^{3}/d).
