= Pleșa =

Pleșa is a Romanian surname and may also refer to several places in Romania. As a surname it is Anglicisized as Plesa.

== Etymology ==
From Romanian language, pleșă (baldness).

== People ==
- Pleșa (Name), a given name or surname
- Mihaela_Plesa, Romanian-American politician, born in 1983
- Gabriel Codru Pleșa, politician, born in 1966
- Dan Pleșa, editor, writer and cultural journalist
- Ion Pleșa, Romanian-Hungarian writer, born in 1956
- Ion Trif Pleșa, writer and publicist, born in 1948
- Ioan Pleșa, university professor, born in 1930

== Places ==
=== Villages ===
- Pleșa, a village in Berești-Meria Commune, Galați County
- Pleșa, a village in the town of Bumbești-Jiu, Gorj County
- Pleșa, a village in Mănăstirea Humorului Commune, Suceava County

=== Rivers ===
- Pleșa (Timiș), a river in Caraș-Severin, Romania, tributary of the Timiș in Caraș-Severin County
- Pleșa, a river in Hunedoara, Romania, tributary of the Jiul de Vest in Hunedoara County
- Pleșa, a tributary of the Horezu in Vâlcea County
- Pleșa, a river in Alba_County, Romania, tributary to the Geoagiu
- Pleșa, a river in Bistrița-Năsăud, Romania, tributary to the Meleș
- Pleșa, a river in Brașov_County, Romania, tributary to the Sebeș
- Pleșa, a river in Vâlcea, Romania, tributary to the Valea Largă

=== Buildings ===
- Castelul Pleșa, a neoclassic palace in Mehedinți County, Romania

== External sources ==
- Familia Pleșa (Pleșea, Plessia) - scurt istoric

== See also ==
- Pleși (disambiguation)
- Pleașa (disambiguation)
- Pleșoiu (disambiguation)
- Pleșești (disambiguation)
- Pleșoi, commune in Dolj county, Romania
- Pleșcoi, village in Buzău county, Romania
- Pleșeni, village in Cantemir country, Republic of Moldova
