= Valea Mare (Timiș) =

- Location within Romania

Location
- Country: Romania
- Counties: Caraș-Severin County
- Villages: Lindenfeld, Poiana

Physical characteristics
- Mouth: Timiș
  - location: Prisian
  - coordinates: 45.3696°N 22.2266°E
- Length: 15 km (9.3 mi)
- Basin size: 50 km^{2} (19 sq mi)

Basin features
- Progression: Timiș→ Danube→ Black Sea

The Valea Mare is a left tributary of the river Timiș in Romania. It flows into the Timiș near Prisian. Its length is 15 km (9.3 mi) and its basin size is 50 km^{2} (19 sq mi).
