= Livezi =

Livezi may refer to:

== Romania ==
- Livezi, Bacău, a commune in Bacău County
- Livezi, Vâlcea, a commune in Vâlcea County
- Livezi, a village in Podari Commune, Dolj County
- Livezi, a village in Mihăileni Commune, Harghita County
- Livezi, a village in General Berthelot Commune, Hunedoara County
- Livezi, a village in Florești Commune, Mehedinți County
- Livezi, a former commune, merged into Vizantea-Livezi Commune, Vrancea County

== Moldova ==
- Livezi, a village in Cremenciug Commune, Soroca district
