= Erőss =

Erőss is a Hungarian surname. Notable people with the surname include:

- Imre Erőss (1909–1950), Romanian Roman Catholic bishop and theologian
- Zsolt Erőss (1968–2013), Hungarian mountaineer
