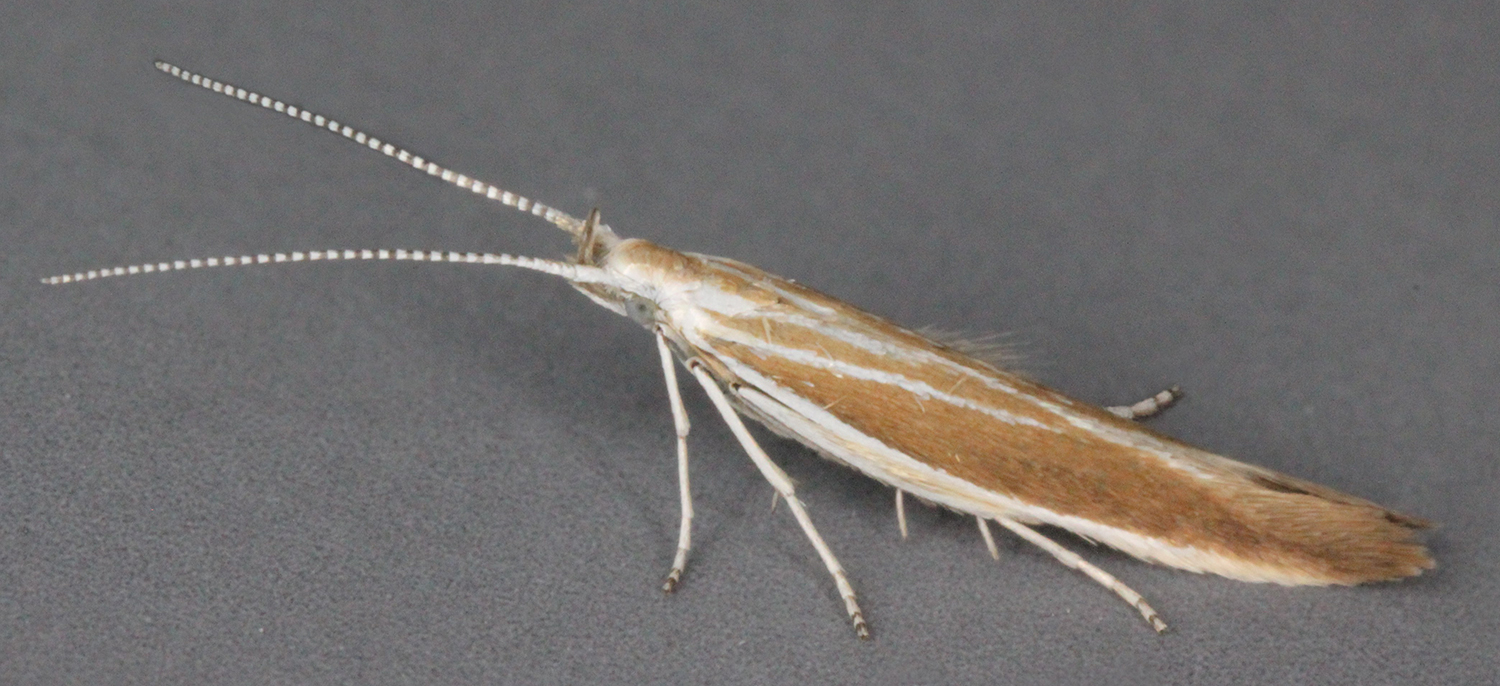
- Coleophora discordella Tolfannau, North Wales
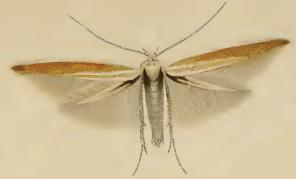

Scientific classification
- Kingdom: Animalia
- Phylum: Arthropoda
- Class: Insecta
- Order: Lepidoptera
- Family: Coleophoridae
- Genus: Coleophora
- Species: C. discordella

Binomial name
- Coleophora discordella Zeller, 1849

Synonyms
- Coleophora dorycniella Hartig, 1939

= Coleophora discordella =

Species of moth

Coleophora discordella is a moth of the family Coleophoridae. It was first described by Philipp Christoph Zeller in 1849 and is found in Europe.

== Description ==
The wingspan is about 11–13 mm. Adults are buff or brown with a white costal streak and some other smaller white streaks. Head white, crown sometimes ochreous-tinged. Antennae white, ringed with dark fuscous, basal joint with rather spreading hairs. Forewings shining yellow -ochreous, slightly brownish-tinged; a white costal streak from base to near apex; a short fine line in disc, one along fold, and one along dorsum white, often almost obsolete. Hindwings grey.

They are on wing in July in western Europe.

The larvae feed on common bird's-foot trefoil (Lotus corniculatus), narrowleaf trefoil (Lotus tenuis) and greater bird's-foot-trefoil (Lotus pedunculatus). Full-grown larvae can be found in May.

== Distribution ==
It is found from Fennoscandia to the Iberian Peninsula, Italy and Greece and from Ireland to Poland.
