= Pârâul Rece =

Pârâul Rece Hideg, Râul Rece
- Location within Romania

Location
- Country: Romania
- Counties: Caraș-Severin County
- Villages: Rusca

Physical characteristics
- Source: Țarcu Mountains
- Mouth: Timiș
  - coordinates: 45.1713°N 22.3029°E
- Length: 38 km (24 mi)
- Basin size: 184 km^{2} (71 sq mi)

Basin features
- Progression: Timiș→ Danube→ Black Sea
- Tributaries
  - left: Ogașu Baranului, Hididel

The Pârâul Rece (also: Hideg, Râul Rece) is a right tributary of the river Timiș in Romania. It discharges into the Timiș near Rusca. Its length is 38 km (24 mi) and its basin size is 184 km^{2} (71 sq mi).
