= Slatina (Timiș) =

River in Romania

- Location within Romania

Location
- Country: Romania
- Counties: Caraș-Severin County
- Villages: Slatina-Timiș

Physical characteristics
- Mouth: Timiș
  - location: Slatina-Timiș
  - coordinates: 45.2631°N 22.2906°E
- Length: 13 km (8.1 mi)
- Basin size: 25 km^{2} (9.7 sq mi)

Basin features
- Progression: Timiș→ Danube→ Black Sea

The Slatina is a left tributary of the river Timiș in Romania. It flows into the Timiș in Slatina-Timiș. Its length is 13 km (8.1 mi) and its basin size is 25 km^{2} (9.7 sq mi).
