= Hididel =

- Location within Romania

Location
- Country: Romania
- Counties: Caraș-Severin County

Physical characteristics
- Source: Muntele Mic
- Mouth: Pârâul Rece
  - coordinates: 45.1602°N 22.4502°E
- Length: 13 km (8.1 mi)
- Basin size: 43 km^{2} (17 sq mi)

Basin features
- Progression: Pârâul Rece→ Timiș→ Danube→ Black Sea
- Tributaries
  - left: Pietrele Albe

The Hididel is a left tributary of the river Pârâul Rece in Romania. It discharges into the Poiana Ruscă Reservoir, which is drained by the Pârâul Rece. Its length is 13 km (8.1 mi) and its basin size is 43 km^{2} (17 sq mi).
