= Știuca (Timiș) =

- Location within Romania

Location
- Country: Romania
- Counties: Timiș County
- Villages: Știuca

Physical characteristics
- Mouth: Timiș
  - location: near Gavojdia
  - coordinates: 45.6444°N 21.9979°E
- Length: 13 km (8.1 mi)
- Basin size: 34 km^{2} (13 sq mi)

Basin features
- Progression: Timiș→ Danube→ Black Sea

The Știuca is a left tributary of the river Timiș in Romania. It discharges into the Timiș near Gavojdia. Its length is 13 km (8.1 mi) and its basin size is 34 km^{2} (13 sq mi).
