= Giulvăz =

- Commune
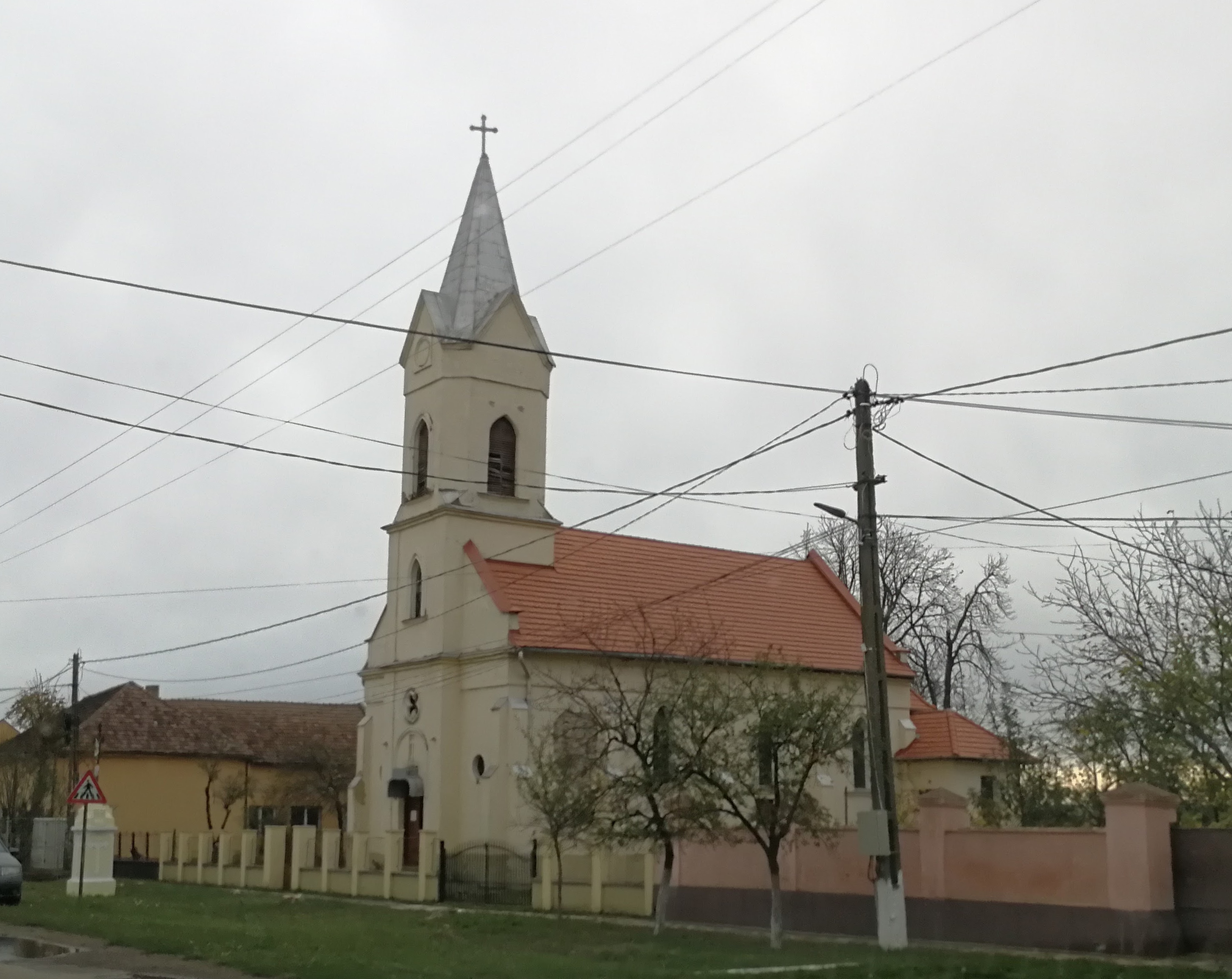
- Roman Catholic church in Giulvăz

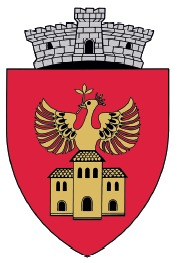
- Coat of arms

- Location in Timiș County

- Location in Romania
- Coordinates: 45°33′N 20°59′E
- Country: Romania
- County: Timiș

Government
  - Mayor (2008–): Florentin Gheorghe Cristeți (PSD)
- Area: 100 km^{2} (39 sq mi)
- Population (2021-12-01): 3,072
  - Density: 31/km^{2} (80/sq mi)
- Time zone: UTC+02:00 (EET)
  - Summer (DST): UTC+03:00 (EEST)
- Postal code: 307225–307228
- Vehicle reg.: TM
- Website: www.primariagiulvaz.ro

Giulvăz (Hungarian: Torontálgyülvész; German: Gilwas; Banat Swabian: Djulwess; Serbian: Ђулвес, romanized: Đulves) is a commune in Timiș County, Romania. It is composed of four villages: Crai Nou, Giulvăz (commune seat), Ivanda and Rudna.

== Geography ==
Giulvăz is located in the southwestern part of the Timiș County. It borders Peciu Nou to the north; Ciacova to the east and southeast, the limit on a great length being the Timiș River; Foeni and Uivar to the west and southwest. The territory of the commune lies in the middle of a low plain area, Ciacova Plain, with altitudes between 80–90 m (260–300 ft).

The climate is characterized by average annual temperatures of 10–11 °C (50–52 °F), average temperatures of −2 °C (28 °F) in January and 22–24 °C (72–75 °F) in July. The average annual rainfall is 500–600 mm (20–24 in). The dominant winds are those from the north, northeast, east and southeast.

The dominant vegetation is the grassy one. The areas with trees and shrubs are few, located especially in the Timiș meadow. The characteristic fauna is that of the steppe represented by rodents such as: suslik, hamster, vole, mole, etc. The birds found here are: sparrow, quail, starling, rook, northern goshawk, magpie, etc. The hunting fauna is represented by hares, pheasants, wild geese and ducks, deer and wild boars.

== History ==
The first recorded mention of Giulvăz dates from 1355. It was inhabited uninterruptedly, during the Middle Ages and the Turkish occupation of Banat. In Marsigli's writings of 1690–1700, it is mentioned and said to have 27 houses. On Count Mercy's map of 1723 it appears with the name Julves, rounded to the district of Ciacova, and on the military map of 1761 it is listed as a rather important locality. In 1779 it joined the Torontál County to which it belonged until the end of World War I. In 1781 it was bought by the Macedo-Romanians Naum and Constantin Dadan, and later, it remained in the property of the latter. Dadan Hungarianizes and becomes Dadányi. From him, the property is inherited by Count Kinsky, who parcels it in 1909.

== Demographics ==
Ethnic composition (2021)
1. Romanians (75.7%)
2. Roma (8.36%)
3. Serbs (3.22%)
4. Unknown (11.2%)
5. Others (1.48%)
Religious composition (2021)
1. Orthodox (74.0%)
2. Pentecostals (7.48%)
3. Serbian Orthodox (3.02%)
4. Roman Catholics (2.24%)
5. Unknown (11.9%)
6. Others (1.34%)
7. Irreligious, atheists and agnostics (0.09%)

Giulvăz had a population of 3,072 inhabitants at the 2021 census, down 0.1% from the 2011 census. Most inhabitants are Romanians (75.71%), larger minorities being represented by Roma (8.36%) and Serbs (3.22%). For 11.23% of the population, ethnicity is unknown. By religion, most inhabitants are Orthodox (73.95%), but there are also minorities of Pentecostals (7.48%), Serbian Orthodox (3.02%) and Roman Catholics (2.24%). For 11.88% of the population, religious affiliation is unknown.

Census		Ethnic composition
Year	Population	Romanians	Hungarians	Germans	Roma	Serbs
1880	3,759	1,067	321	528	–	1,830
1890	4,245	1,273	312	693	–	1,958
1900	4,568	1,272	340	968	–	1,974
1910	4,672	1,212	480	888	–	2,051
1920	4,345	1,019	400	835	–	–
1930	5,048	1,870	214	874	128	1,936
1941	5,128	2,089	242	740	–	–
1956	4,264	2,100	146	338	165	1,508
1966	3,962	2,302	121	267	50	1,210
1977	3,667	2,369	121	211	36	923
1992	2,813	2,144	51	94	87	424
2002	3,022	2,396	72	38	175	327
2011	3,075	2,459	50	32	169	198
2021	3,072	2,326	22	14	257	99

== Politics and administration ==
The commune of Giulvăz is administered by a mayor and a local council composed of 12 councilors. The mayor, Florentin Gheorghe Cristeți, from the Social Democratic Party, has been in office since 2008. As from the 2024 local elections, the local council has the following composition by political parties:

Party	Seats	Composition
Social Democratic Party	7	
Save Romania Union–People's Movement Party–Force of the Right	2	
Alliance for the Union of Romanians	2	
S.O.S. Romania	1	

== Economy ==
The basic economic activities of Giulvăz are agriculture and animal husbandry, activities favored by the commune's position in the middle of a plain area. Out of the total surface of the commune, 92.75% is agricultural territory in use, with 74.1% arable lands and 22.4% pastures. The agricultural area per inhabitant is 3.5 ha/inhab.
