= Pleșa (Timiș) =

- Location within Romania

Location
- Country: Romania
- Counties: Caraș-Severin County
- Villages: Ciuta

Physical characteristics
- Source: Poiana Ruscă Mountains
- Mouth: Timiș
  - coordinates: 45.5074°N 22.1785°E
- Length: 13 km (8.1 mi)
- Basin size: 17 km^{2} (6.6 sq mi)

Basin features
- Progression: Timiș→ Danube→ Black Sea

The Pleșa is a right tributary of the river Timiș in Romania. It flows into the Timiș near Prisaca. Its length is 13 km (8.1 mi) and its basin size is 17 km^{2} (6.6 sq mi).
