= Goleț =

- Location within Romania

Location
- Country: Romania
- Counties: Caraș-Severin County
- Villages: Goleț

Physical characteristics
- Mouth: Timiș
  - coordinates: 45°17′20″N 22°16′55″E
- Length: 16 km (9.9 mi)
- Basin size: 46 km^{2} (18 sq mi)

Basin features
- Progression: Timiș→ Danube→ Black Sea

The Goleț is a left tributary of the river Timiș in Romania. It discharges into the Timiș near Bucoșnița. Its length is 16 km (9.9 mi) and its basin size is 46 km^{2} (18 sq mi).
