= Constantin Daicoviciu =

Romanian historian and archaeologist (1898–1973)

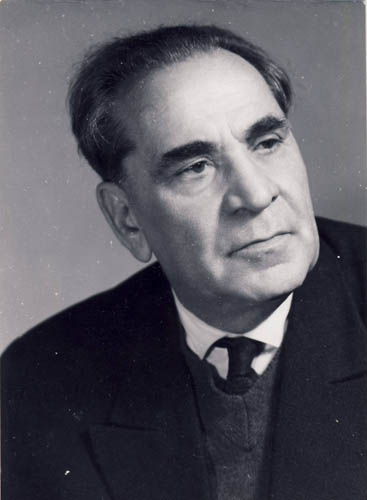
- Born: February 22, 1898; Kavarán, Krassó-Szörény County, Austria-Hungary
- Died: May 27, 1973 (aged 75); Cluj, Romania
- Occupations: Historian, archaeologist
- Children: Hadrian Daicoviciu

Academic background
- Education: University of Cluj

Constantin Daicoviciu (Romanian pronunciation: [konstanˈtin ˈdajkovitʃju]; February 22, 1898 – May 27, 1973) was a Romanian historian and archaeologist, professor at the University of Cluj, and titular member of the Romanian Academy.

He was born in Kavarán, Kingdom of Hungary, Austria-Hungary (now Căvăran, Romania). His father Damaschin was a Romanian Orthodox religion teacher, while his mother Sofia (née Drăgan) was the orphaned daughter of the village schoolteacher. After finishing primary school in Căvăran, he attended the state high school in Lugoj from 1909 to 1916. Following a stint in the Austro-Hungarian Army during World War I, he entered the University of Cluj in the autumn of 1918.

From 1923 to 1968 he was a faculty member of the University of Cluj, advancing to associate professor in 1932 and full professor in 1938. After Northern Transylvania (including the city of Cluj) was transferred to Hungary in the wake of the Second Vienna Award of August 1940, Daicoviciu moved to the University of Sibiu, where he was dean of the philology department in 1940–41.

After World War II, Daicoviciu returned to Cluj, where he was rector (president) of the University of Cluj from 1957 to 1968. From 1948 to 1952 he served as Deputy in the Great National Assembly. He was elected full member of the Romanian Academy in 1955.

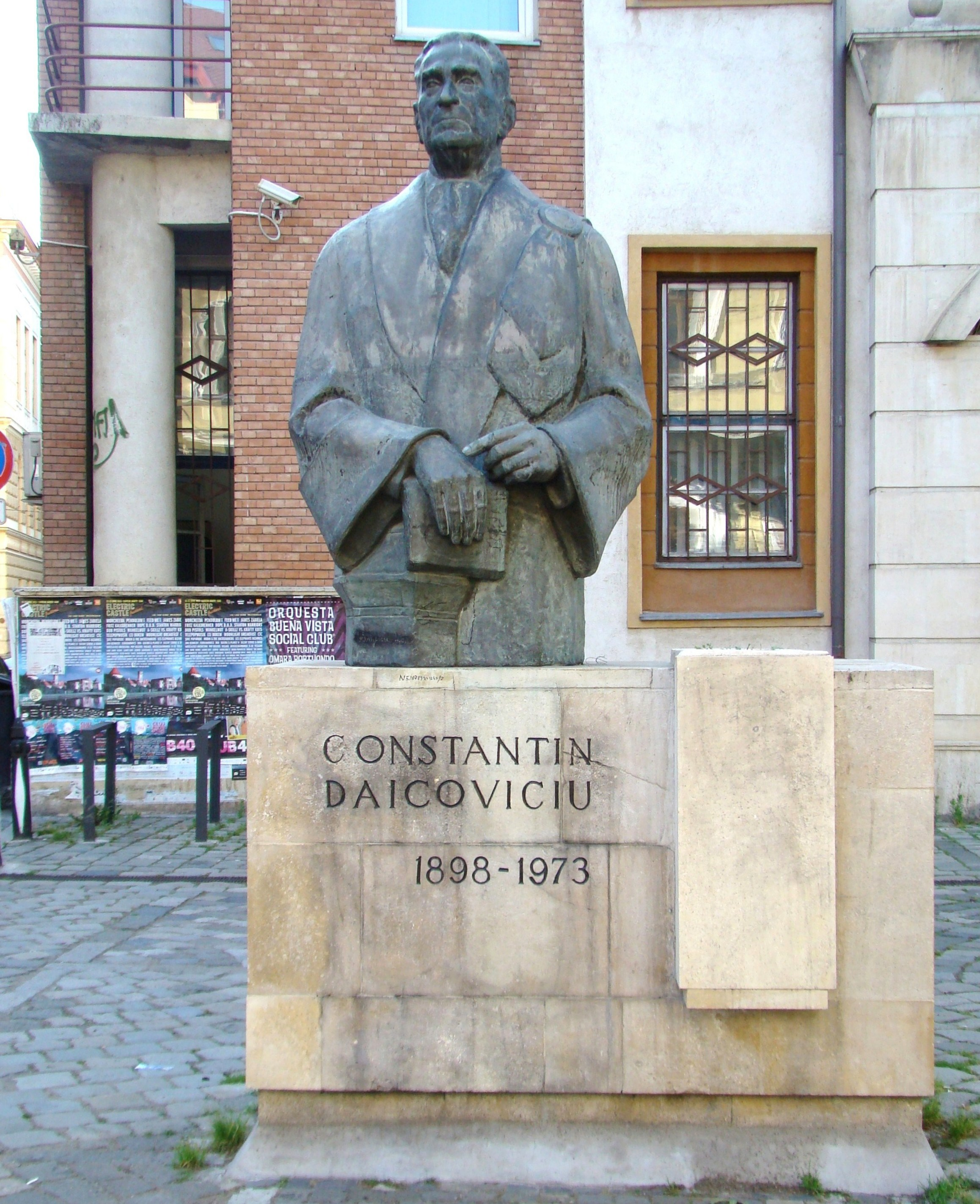
Bust of Daicoviciu in Cluj-Napoca

He was the main representative of the Daco-Romanian continuity theory that was actively promoted in Communist Romania as the accepted ethnogenesis theory of the Romanian nation. A 1978 public letter by anonymous Hungarian intellectuals claims that, in his political testament, Daicoviciu withdrew his theses, calling his theory (by the time adopted by the state in education) only hypothetical.

He married Lucia Bugnariu in 1931. Their son, Hadrian Daicoviciu (1932–1984), was also a historian.

He died in 1973 in Cluj, and was buried in the city's Hajongard Cemetery. Since his death, the commune in the Banat where he was born in bears his name.

== Book ==
- Emil Condurachi, Constantin Daicoviciu, The Ancient Civilization of Romania, London: Barrie & Jenkins, 1971. 250 pp. ISBN 0-214-65256-4
