= Ad Pannonios (castra) =

- Castra of Teregova; Panonin
- Location within Romania
- 45.16861°N 22.30683°E
- Location: La luncă / La hideg, Teregova, Caraș-Severin, Romania

Site notes
- Elevation: 375 m (1,230 ft)
- Condition: Ruined

Ad Pannonios was a fort in the Roman province of Dacia.

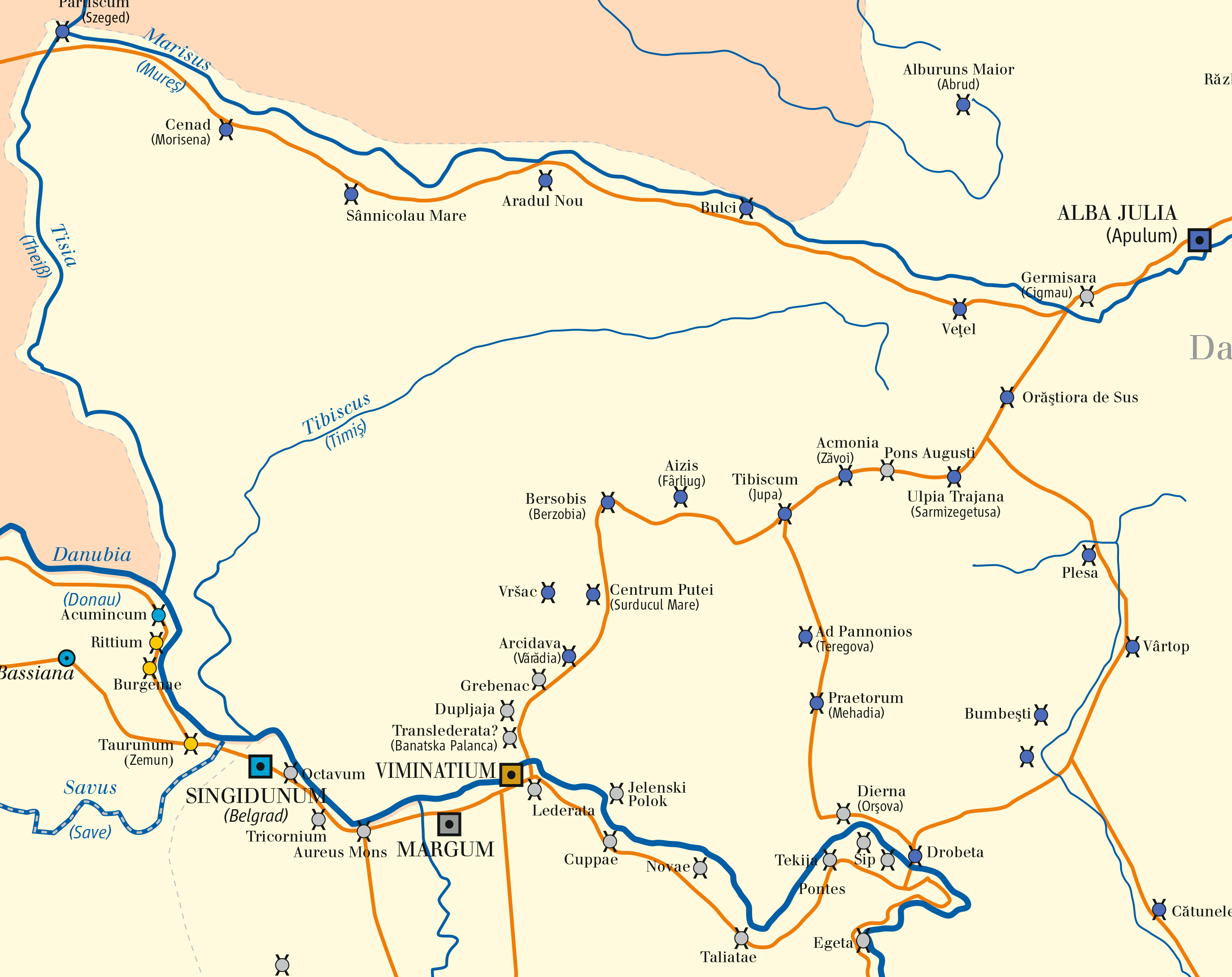
Western Dacia forts

== See also ==
- List of castra
