= Iarcoș =

- Location within Romania

Location
- Country: Romania
- Counties: Timiș
- Villages: Bazoș

Physical characteristics
- Mouth: Timiș
  - coordinates: 45.719°N 21.419°E
- Length: 22 km (14 mi)
- Basin size: 46 km^{2} (18 sq mi)

Basin features
- Progression: Timiș→ Danube→ Black Sea

The Iarcoș is a right tributary of the river Timiș in Romania. It discharges into the Timiș near Dragșina. Its length is 22 km (14 mi) and its basin size is 46 km^{2} (18 sq mi).
