= Timișaț =

- Location within Romania

Location
- Country: Romania
- Counties: Timiș County
- Villages: Otelec, Iohanisfeld, Foeni, Cruceni

Physical characteristics
- Mouth: Timiș
  - location: Grăniceri
  - coordinates: 45.4501°N 20.8902°E
- Length: 24 km (15 mi)
- Basin size: 333 km^{2} (129 sq mi)

Basin features
- Progression: Timiș→ Danube→ Black Sea
- Tributaries
  - left: Bega Mică

The Timișaț is a right tributary of the river Timiș in Romania. It discharges into the Timiș in Grăniceri. Its length is 24 km (15 mi) and its basin size is 333 km^{2} (129 sq mi). It has been canalized for most of its length, and is used as a drainage canal for the area between the rivers Bega and Timiș. For a short reach of 95 m the Timișaț defines the border between Romania and Serbia.
