= Teregova (river) =

- Location within Romania

Location
- Country: Romania
- Counties: Caraș-Severin County
- Villages: Teregova

Physical characteristics
- Source: Semenic Mountains
- Mouth: Timiș
  - location: Teregova
  - coordinates: 45.1578°N 22.2985°E
- Length: 16 km (9.9 mi)
- Basin size: 50 km^{2} (19 sq mi)

Basin features
- Progression: Timiș→ Danube→ Black Sea
- Tributaries
  - right: Teregovița, Lazul

The Teregova is a right tributary of the river Timiș in Romania. It flows into the Timiș in the village Teregova. Its length is 16 km (9.9 mi) and its basin size is 50 km^{2} (19 sq mi).
