= Bolvașnița =

- Commune
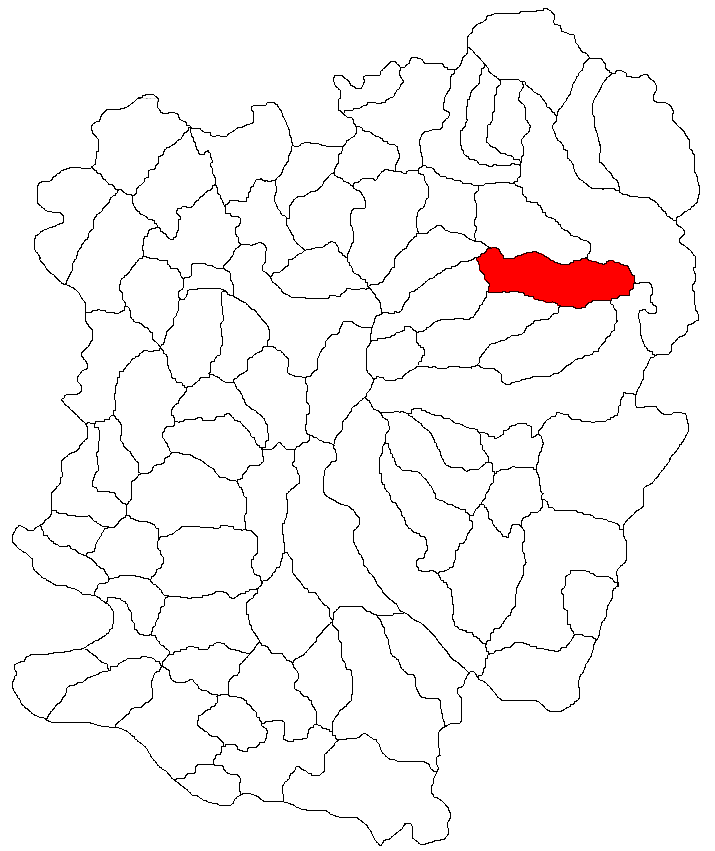
- Location in Caraș-Severin County

- Location in Romania
- Coordinates: 45°21′N 22°18′E
- Country: Romania
- County: Caraș-Severin

Government
  - Mayor (2024–2028): Marius Maxim Daniel Măran (PNL)
- Area: 89.26 km^{2} (34.46 sq mi)
- Elevation: 294 m (965 ft)
- Population (2021-12-01): 1,286
  - Density: 14.41/km^{2} (37.31/sq mi)
- Time zone: UTC+02:00 (EET)
  - Summer (DST): UTC+03:00 (EEST)
- Postal code: 327035
- Area code: +(40) x55
- Vehicle reg.: CS
- Website: www.primaria-bolvasnita.ro

Bolvașnița (Hungarian: Bolvás) is a commune in Caraș-Severin County, western Romania, with a population of 1,286 people as of 2021. It is composed of two villages, Bolvașnițan and Vârciorova (Varcsaró). It is situated in the historical region of Banat.

The commune is situated in the foothills of the Țarcu Mountains, at an altitude of 294 m (965 ft), on the banks of the river Bolvașnița. It located in the northeastern part of the county, 13 km (8.1 mi) southeast of Caransebeș and 54 km (34 mi) east of the county seat, Reșița.

Historical population
Year	Pop.	±%
1880	1,969	—
1910	2,199	+11.7%
1930	2,179	−0.9%
1977	1,871	−14.1%
2002	1,573	−15.9%
2011	1,405	−10.7%
2021	1,286	−8.5%
Source: Census data
