= Gavojdia =

- Commune
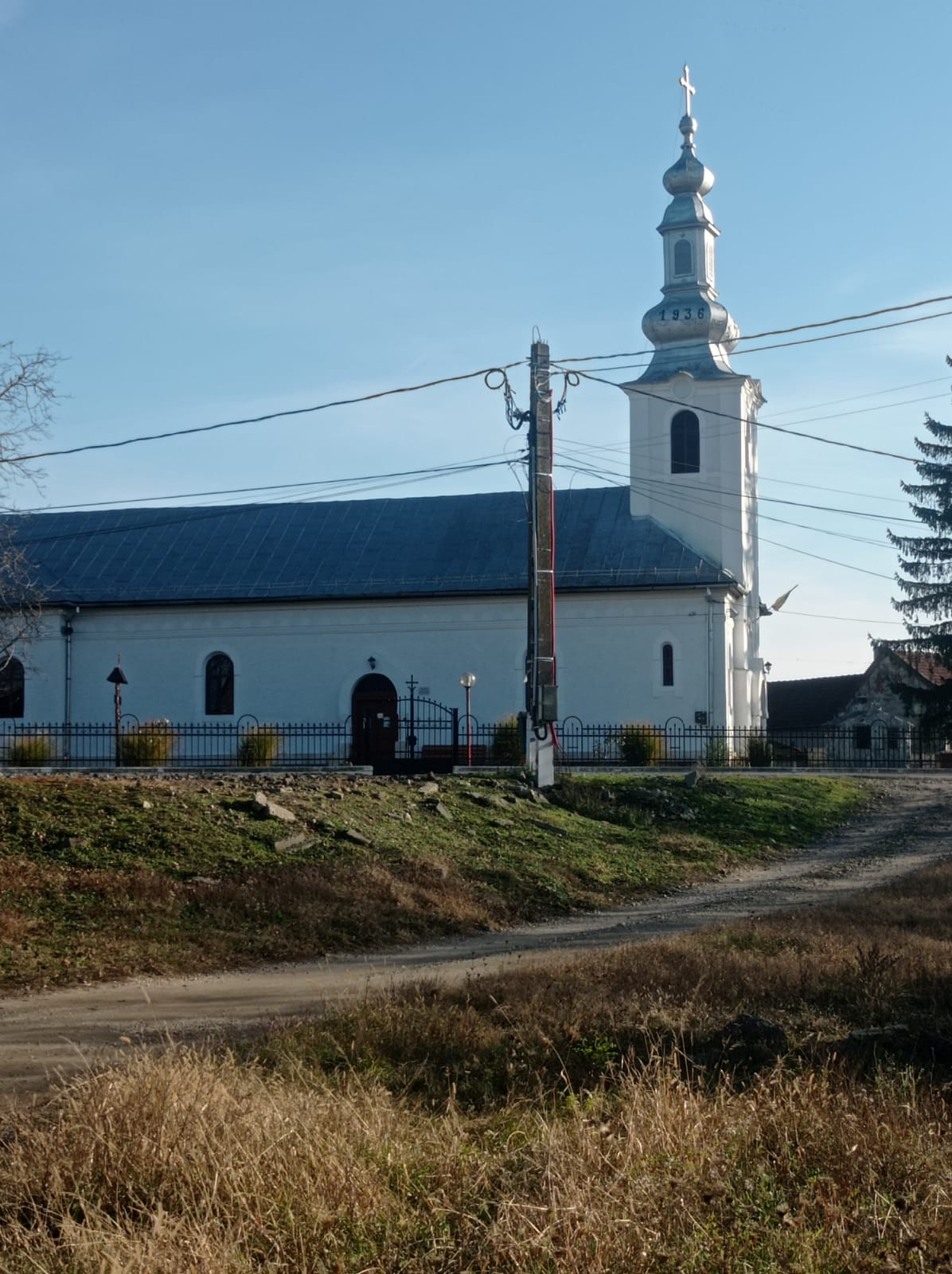
- Ascension Church in Gavojdia

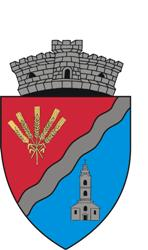
- Coat of arms

- Location in Timiș County

- Location in Romania
- Coordinates: 45°37′N 22°1′E
- Country: Romania
- County: Timiș

Government
  - Mayor (2024–2028): Dănuț Toma Stoica
- Area: 74.94 km^{2} (28.93 sq mi)
- Population (2021-12-01): 2,719
  - Density: 36.28/km^{2} (93.97/sq mi)
- Time zone: UTC+02:00 (EET)
  - Summer (DST): UTC+03:00 (EEST)
- Postal code: 307180–307183
- Vehicle reg.: TM
- Website: www.comunagavojdia.ro

Gavojdia (often spelled Găvojdia; Hungarian: Gavosdia; German: Gawoschdia) is a commune in Timiș County, Romania. It is composed of four villages: Gavojdia (commune seat), Jena, Lugojel and Sălbăgel.

== Etymology ==
The name Gavojdia has its origin in the Latin quvae which means "hills" and sideo which means "settlement", which would translate as "settlement between hills". There is another theory according to which Gavojdia has its origin in the Slavic gvojd which means "iron" and gvojde which means "blacksmith", since there were many blacksmiths serving the interests of landowners and those who traveled by stagecoach here. Hungarian ethnologists claimed that the origin of the word Gavojdia came from kő which means "stone" and köves which means "stony".

== Geography ==
Gavojdia is located in the southeast of Timiș County, in the Lugoj Plain. It covers an area of 74.94 km^{2} (28.93 mi^{2}), most of which is arable land, the rest being pastures, hayfields, vineyards, orchards and others. Gavojdia is crossed by two main streams, Sudriaș (known locally as Vâna) and Știuca, both collected by the Timiș River. Știuca has its source on the territory of the homonymous village, with intermittent flow. Vâna has a continuous flow, but it is not important for irrigation; its water is good for watering cattle.

=== Climate ===
The average annual temperature is 11.1 °C (52.0 °F). By season, in winter there is an average temperature of −0.5 °C (31.1 °F), and in summer 20.4 °C (68.7 °F); in spring the temperature averages 11.4 °C (52.5 °F), and in autumn 11.7 °C (53.1 °F). The average annual number of winter days is 18.88 days with temperatures below 0 °C (32 °F). The average annual number of summer days with temperatures above 25 °C (77 °F) is 106.9 days. The average annual rainfall is 639.9 mm (25.19 in). Gavojdia gets maximum rainfall in May, June, August, October and November, while January and February are generally the driest months. The dominant wind blows from the southeast with a frequency of 20%. Wind strength is generally low.

=== Flora ===
The specific vegetation is that of the plain and hill forests. In forests that have survived deforestation, especially on areas that could not be cultivated due to relief or excess moisture, species such as Quercus cerris (Turkey oak), Quercus pedunculiflora (greyish oak), Quercus robur (pedunculate oak) and Quercus pubescens (downy oak) predominate, in association with Carpinus betulus (hornbeam), Tilia tomentosa (silver linden), Cornus mas (cornel), Alnus glutinosa (alder), Corylus avellana (hazel) and Prunus spinosa (blackthorn). On the wide valleys, with the groundwater closer to the surface, there are clusters of Salix alba (white willow) and Salix × fragilis (crack willow), Populus alba (silver poplar) and Populus nigra (black poplar), Alnus glutinosa (alder), Clematis vitalba (old man's beard) and Rosa canina (dog rose), and on the consolidated ravines grow species such as Robinia pseudoacacia (black locust), Pyrus pyraster (wild pear), Vitis sylvestris (wild grapevine), Gleditsia triacanthos (honey locust), Prunus spinosa (blackthorn) and Rosa canina (dog rose).

The natural meadows are varied from a floristic point of view, with the mesophilic and mesoxerophilic groups dominating; in the areas with the groundwater closer to the surface, the mesophilic and hydrophilic groups prevail. The meadows in the hilly area are made up of species such as Festuca pseudovina and Festuca pratensis (meadow fescue), Agrostis capillaris (bent), Poa pratensis (meadow-grass), Alopecurus pratensis (meadow foxtail), Bromus secalinus (rye brome), Cynodon dactylon (dog's tooth grass), Lotus corniculatus (bird's-foot trefoil) and Lotus tenuis (narrowleaf trefoil), Medicago falcata (yellow lucerne), Trifolium repens (white clover) and Bothriochloa ischaemum (yellow bluestem). On the sunny slopes there are species such as Elymus repens (couch), Rubus caesius (dewberry) and Stipa spp. (feather grass). The meadows in the lowland area are small in size, being made up of species such as Lolium perenne (ryegrass), Festuca valesiaca (Volga fescue), Agrostis capillaris (bent), Dactylis glomerata (cock's-foot), Alopecurus pratensis (meadow foxtail), Lotus corniculatus (bird's-foot trefoil) and Lotus tenuis (narrowleaf trefoil), Trifolium repens (white clover) and Medicago lupulina (black medick).

Associations of Carex spp. (sedge), Juncus effusus (rush) and, more rarely, Typha latifolia (bulrush) and Phragmites australis (reed) develop in the microdepression forms in the meadows and on the valleys, accompanied by Gratiola officinalis (hedgehyssop), Mentha × piperita (peppermint) and Bidens tripartita (three-lobe beggartick).

The following wild flowers and plants grow in fields, hedges and stubbles: Viola tricolor (wild pansy), Capsella bursa-pastoris (shepherd's purse), Lepidium draba (hoary cress), Anagallis arvensis (red pimpernel), Lamium album (white nettle), Urtica dioica (stinging nettle), Russula heterophylla (brittlegill), Taraxacum officinale (dandelion), Aristolochia clematitis (birthwort), Rorippa palustris (yellow-cress), Raphanus raphanistrum (wild radish), Papaver rhoeas (red poppy), Centaurea cyanus (cornflower), Agrostemma githago (corn-cockle), Sambucus ebulus (dwarf elder), Cirsium arvense (field thistle), Consolida regalis (field larkspur), Ranunculus repens (creeping buttercup), Vicia spp. (vetch), Convolvulus arvensis (field bindweed), Matricaria chamomilla (chamomile), Primula veris (cowslip), Achillea millefolium (yarrow), Conium maculatum (hemlock), Echium vulgare (viper's bugloss), Althaea officinalis (marsh mallow), Polygonum aviculare (knotgrass), etc.

=== Fauna ===
The wildlife is varied. Among the most characteristic species are: hare, harvest mouse, badger, fox, wild boar, deer, etc. The ornithological fauna is represented by: pheasant, hoopoe, nightingale, blackbird, leaf warbler, woodpecker, turtle dove, roller, golden oriole, etc. There are also reptiles, spread both in forests and on crops and pastures: sand lizard, green lizard, slow worm, grass snake, dice snake, salamander, etc. The ichthyological fauna is represented by barbel, bleak, minnow, sunfish, nase and Kessler's gudgeon. In Gavojdia the inhabitants grow large-horned cattle, horses, sheep and pigs.

== History ==
Gavojdia first appears in written history under the name Kuvesd (Cueșd), in 1363. In the first half of the 15th century, Hungarian documents mention two Cueșds, "Lower Cueșd" (Cueșdiul de Jos) and "Upper Cueșd" (Cueșdiul de Sus). In 1447 John Hunyadi donated half of his domain in Lower and Upper Cueșd to Dan and Vlad Temesely, the other part being in the possession of Petru and Ioan, sons of the late Deneș (Dees). Between 1514–1516 these localities were called Gavojdioara and were the property of George of Brandenburg-Ansbach, the chatelaine of the Jdioara Fortress.

According to the local tradition, the inhabitants of Gavojdia came from Dâmbovița, a village that between the 15th–17th centuries was located between Gavojdia and Lugoj, on the valley of the Știuca River. The departure of the inhabitants from Dâmbovița to Gavojdia, where they settled permanently, is related to the invasions of the Turkish armies around 1551 when most of the young people from Dâmbovița were taken to the army by the Turks or killed. On the other hand, the Știuca River overflowed frequently, flooding the courtyards and gardens of the inhabitants of Dâmbovița. The evacuation of Dâmbovița was carried out periodically. After 1650, Dâmbovița no longer appears in any Austro-Hungarian document. During the emigration of the inhabitants from Dâmbovița, their settlement was made to the left and to the right of the Vâna River, so that towards the end of the 18th century, only one Gavojdia was coagulated.

== Demographics ==
Ethnic composition (2021)
1. Romanians (89.1%)
2. Ukrainians (1.47%)
3. Unknown (9.19%)
4. Others (0.23%)
Religious composition (2021)
1. Orthodox (85.2%)
2. Pentecostals (3.27%)
3. Unknown (9.67%)
4. Others (1.56%)
5. Irreligious, atheists and agnostics (0.25%)

Gavojdia had a population of 2,719 inhabitants at the 2021 census, down 10.39% from the 2011 census. Most inhabitants are Romanians (89.11%), with a minority of Ukrainians (1.47%). For 9.19% of the population, ethnicity is unknown. By religion, most inhabitants are Orthodox (85.25%), with a minority of Pentecostals (3.27%). For 9.67% of the population, religious affiliation is unknown.

Census		Ethnic composition
Year	Population	Romanians	Hungarians	Germans	Roma	Ukrainians
1880	3,591	3,129	165	230	–	–
1890	3,844	3,411	177	199	–	–
1900	4,445	3,507	311	521	–	–
1910	4,257	3,637	361	186	–	3
1920	3,561	3,279	102	80	–	–
1930	3,681	3,334	141	105	26	1
1941	3,764	3,444	86	78	–	–
1956	3,658	3,356	107	56	13	61
1966	3,593	3,338	61	65	2	84
1977	3,576	3,301	29	24	–	169
1992	3,189	2,903	18	6	–	253
2002	3,169	2,752	42	17	32	310
2011	3,034	2,644	13	–	31	245
2021	2,719	2,423	3	–	–	40

== Politics and administration ==
The commune of Gavojdia is administered by a mayor and a local council composed of 10 councilors. The mayor, Dănuț Toma Stoica, from the Social Democratic Party, has been in office since 2000. As from the 2024 local elections, the local council has the following composition by political parties:

Party	Seats	Composition
Social Democratic Party–National Liberal Party	7	
Alliance for the Union of Romanians	1	
Romanian National Conservative Party	1	
Save Romania Union	1	

== Economy ==
The main economic activities of the inhabitants of the commune and, at the same time, the main sources of income are agriculture, trade and other economic activities, including the exploitation of stone and gravel. The area cultivated with cereals is about 660 ha, and the non-food crops are cultivated on about 435 ha. The soil, relief and climate of Gavojdia favor the cultivation of wheat, corn, barley, oat and sunflower.
