= House snake =

House snake can refer to the following genera:

- Elaphe
- Lampropeltis
- Lamprophis
- Dryophylax
- Mesotes
