= Timiș =

River in Romania and Serbia

Timiș Tamiš
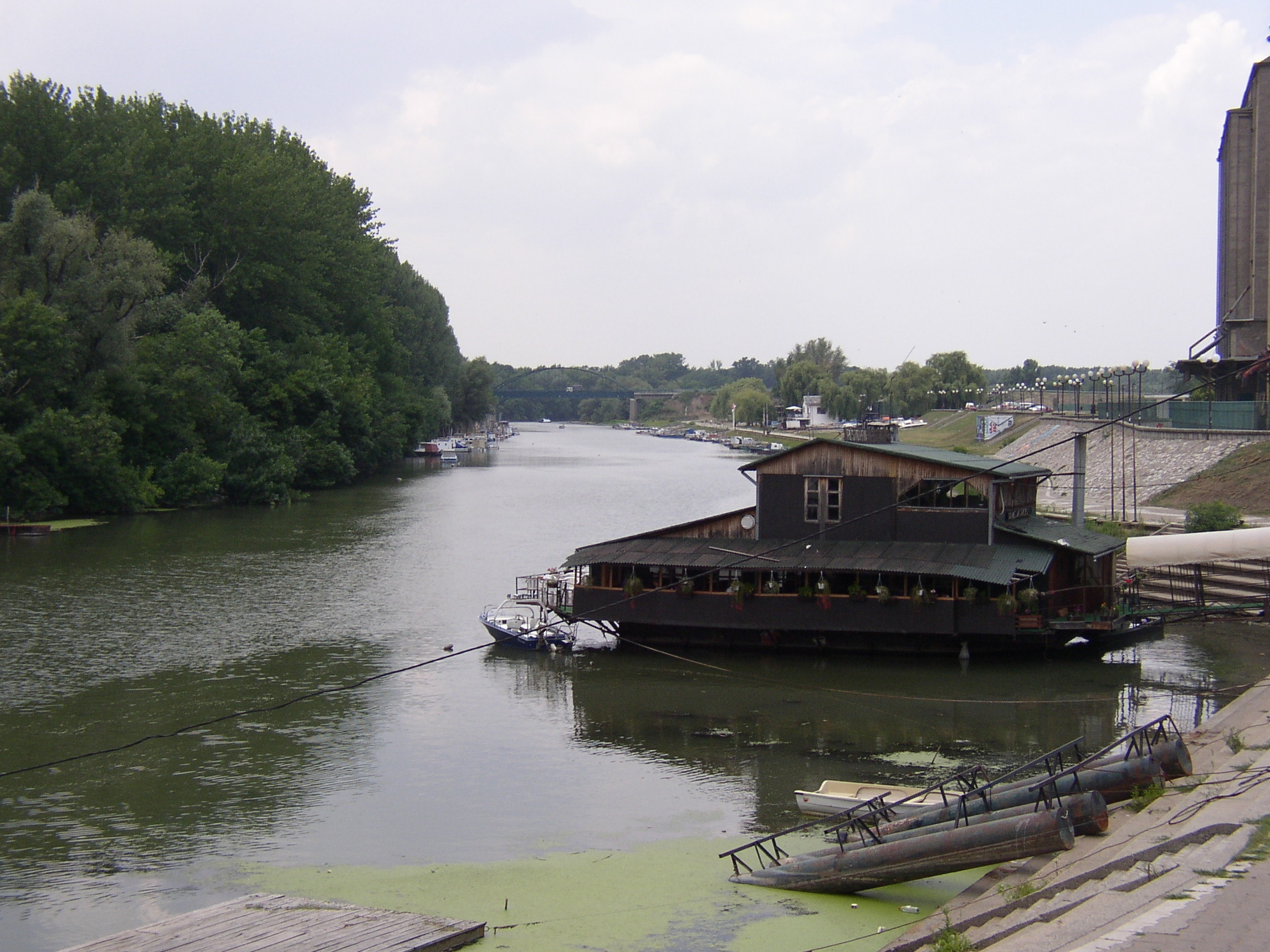
- The Timiș (Tamiš) in Pančevo, Serbia

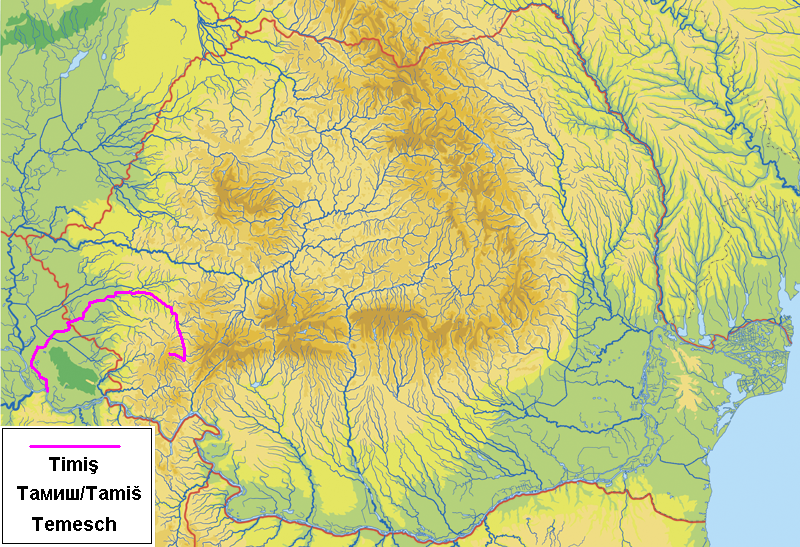
- Native name: Timiș (Romanian); Тамиш / Tamiš (Serbian)

Location
- Countries: Romania; Serbia
- Counties/Province: Caraș-Severin; Timiș; Vojvodina
- Towns: Caransebeș; Lugoj; Pančevo

Physical characteristics
- Source: Semenic Mountains, Romania
- Mouth: Danube
  - location: near Pančevo, Serbia
  - coordinates: 44°50′53″N 20°38′08″E
- Length: 359 km (223 mi)
- Basin size: 10,280 km^{2} (3,970 sq mi)
- Discharge
  - average: 47 m^{3}/s (1,700 cu ft/s)

Basin features
- Progression: Danube→ Black Sea
- Tributaries
  - left: Pogăniș; Bârzava/Brzava
  - right: Bistra

The Timiș or Tamiš (Romanian: Timiș, Serbian: Тамиш / Tamiš, Hungarian: Temes, German: Temesch) is a 359-kilometre-long (223 mi) river that flows through the Banat region of Romania and Serbia and joins the Danube near Pančevo, in northern Serbia. Due to its position in the region, it has been labeled as the "spine of the Banat".

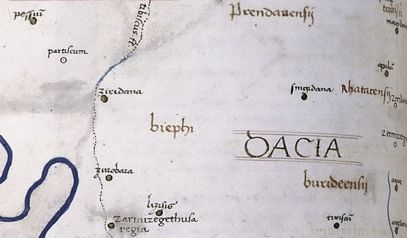
Tibiscus on Dacia's map from a medieval book made after Ptolemy's Geographia (ca. 140 AD).

== Name ==
In antiquity, the river was known as Tibiscus (in Latin) and Tibisis (Θίβισις in ancient Greek), and as Timisis in De Administrando Imperio; in addition, Edward Gibbon referred to it as the Teyss.

The Romans, who traversed the plains of Hungary, suppose that they passed several navigable rivers, either in canoes or portable boats; but there is reason to suspect that the winding stream of the Teyss, or Tibiscus, might present itself in different places under different names.

== Geography ==
The drainage area covers 10,280 km^{2} (3,970 sq mi), of which 7,310 km^{2} (2,820 sq mi) in Romania. With the Danube, the Timis belongs to the Black Sea drainage basin. The river flows through Romania for 241 km (150 mi), and 118 km (73 mi) through Serbia. Its average discharge at the mouth is 47 m^{3}/s (1,700 cu ft/s).

The source of the river is near the mountain resort Semenic, in the Semenic Mountains, Caraș-Severin County, Romania. It flows towards the southeast, through the Trei Ape Reservoir, until it turns north near Teregova. Downstream from Caransebeș it turns northwest. It leaves the mountains and enters the Banat plain near Lugoj. After entering Banat, the river becomes slow and meandering. The most important port is the heavily industrialized Pančevo.

At the river's mouth, on the right bank, there is a forested area, the Pančevo Forest. It covers 300 ha (740 acres) of marshland, with several dozen of deciduous species and 176 species of birds and mammals. The colonies of magnificent bryozoans were found in the river.

In June 2023, Serbian government began process of declaring a landscape of outstanding features Potamišje ("Tamiš valley"). It will protect the river's flood valley on the territory of Zrenjanin, Kovačica, and Opovo municipalities. A spatial plan for wider valley area (including Sečanj and Plandište) has been concurrently made.

== Characteristics ==
Within the scopes of the Interreg IPA program, conducted jointly by Romania and Serbia, the area around the river has been arranged in the 2017-2019 period. Starting from Timiș' origin in Romania, up to its mouth in Serbia, the bird watch towers, benches, gazebos, small bridges, billboards, signposts and waste containers have been placed. The bicycle paths along the river have been built and locations for recreational fishing have been set. At Pančevo, near the confluence, there are catamarans, canoes and bicycles for renting.

The right bank, on river's course through Pančevo close to its mouth, was arranged as a promenade in the 1980s. A plan of massive reconstruction of the quay and urbanization of the area was announced for years and confirmed in June 2020. Section between the bridge and old shipyard facilities will be completely reconstructed with addition of renovation of "city pontoon" (floating platform for various public activities), sports and recreation fields, skate park, ski slopes, bicycle paths, etc. The project is called "Pančevo Promenade". It also includes the footbridge across the Timiș which will connect the city with the City Forest which stretches along the opposite, un-urbanized bank. The forest degraded in time and will be rejuvenated as part of the same project. The anti-flood embankments will be re-fortified, too. The deadline is 2023.

Arranged beach on the Timiș, with paid tickets and some 200 visitors daily, was recorded in Pančevo in 1891. Later, two beaches developed in Donji Grad neighborhood, left of the bridge across the river: Waltman's and municipal (also called students or military beach). The former was paid and had pontoons, while the latter, with two marked basins, was open for everyone. Sports club "Banat" held revues and competitions on the municipal beach in the 1920s, which survived until the 1970s. Upstream, there was another beach in Gornji Grad neighborhood called "At three carrots", while the wild beach "Bećar Lido" developed on the very mouth into the Danube.

By the 2020s, several beaches developed along the river's banks, outside if Pančevo. At Idvor, 250 poplars were planted, to restore the natural vegetation balance along the river. A small bridge was placed, and the crushed stone was poured before the beach, to purify and clear the water. In Glogonj, there is Skela beach. In Jabuka, there are two beaches. One, also called Skela, was arranged as part of the joint Serbian-Romanian project "Eco-Timiș - new touristic product". The other one is Pesak. All got new access roads, some of them have barges-restaurants, some sports fields, etc.

== Navigation ==
In its lower course, the river is regulated, and for the last 53 km (33 mi) it is navigable.

Pančevo had a busy port already in the 17th century, when it was occupied by the Ottoman Turks. Later, in Habsburg period, it became a hub of the river routes in the Banat region. The grain was transported to the capital Vienna, while later, with the industrialization of Pančevo, shipping of the beer, silk, salt, bricks and timber developed. In time, a row of halls, warehouses and storage object along the river bank were built. With the appearance of the steam power, the passenger transport developed too, connecting Pančevo and Serbian capital Belgrade. As Pančevo grew into the developed industrial center, by the early 20th century the traffic on Timiș became so intensive that the river had to be rerouted and straighten, with numerous canals being cut through around it.

=== Lighthouses ===
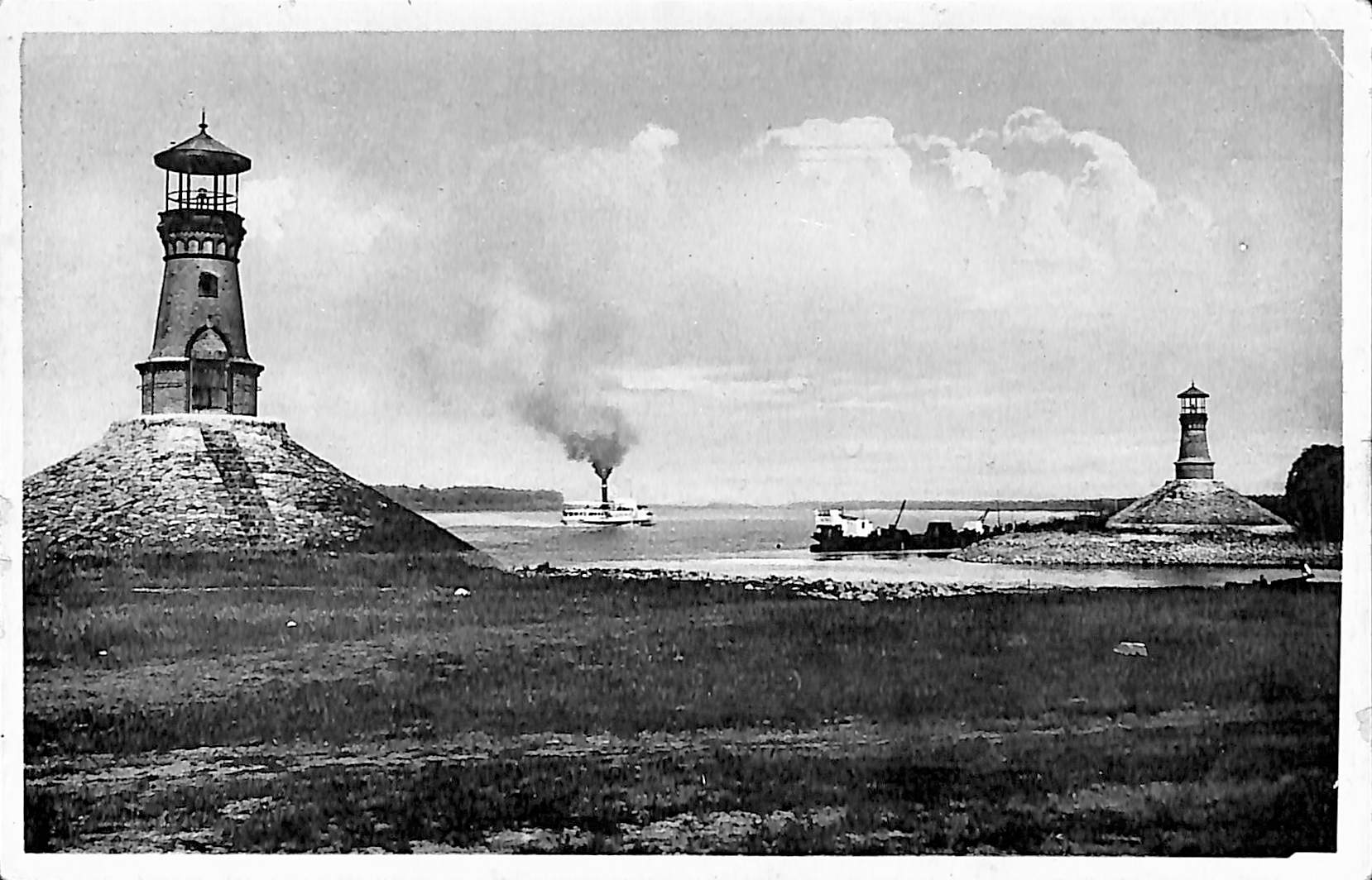
Old photo of the Timiș' lighthouses

At the mouth of the Timiș into the Danube, there are two lighthouses, one on the each bank of the Timiș. They are one of the rare inland lighthouses in Europe, as the banks of the rivers are usually visible so there is no need for them. They are also among only few inland lighthouses in the world, and the only one in Europe, that were built in pair. Measured by the Danube, they are located at Danube'e 1,154 km (717 mi), on its left bank, and 3 km (1.9 mi) from downtown Pančevo.

The lighthouses were built during the "golden age" of the steam-powered river traffic. They are designed in the military style. The cone-shaped bases have 153 m (502 ft) in diameter, and are plated with stone. The towers are sturdy and massive, built of yellow bricks. Doors and paned windows are framed with decorative garlands made of bricks. The top platform has an open terrace with the powerful lighthouse reflector. The terrace is covered with cone-shaped roof, resting on the metal rods.

After the works to improve the navigation were conducted in the early twentieth century, river's mouth area was left without any landmarks. The trees and overgrowth were cut during the digging of the canals so the area and the course of the river was new and unfamiliar to the ship crews. Situation became dangerous, especially at night, as there were no natural orienteering marks, so the wreckages became frequent. To prevent this, the lighthouses were built in 1909. The one on the right bank of the Timiș is built in the Ferland locality, while the left one is in the Pančevo's section of Mali Rit. They became very popular. The honking of the ships passing next to them was considered "obligatory", while the young boatmen and town youth used to visit and climb onto them, as a sort of the adolescent dare games. They were also writing and carving their names and short notes on the bricks, so by the time of the 2000s reconstruction, almost none of the bricks were carve-free.

Since then, the steamboats were replaced with modern ships and Pančevo got a new port on the Daunube, so the old one, on the Timiș, was closed. The lighthouses went out of use in the 1960s and were left to the elements. In time, the locals stripped from them all that could be taken and transported by the boat, including metal staircases, oil lamps, etc. The stone slabs were used for paving private backyards and the bases, without this stone cover, were being partially washed off by thy river which compromised the integrity of the objects as they began to tilt and the collapse became a serious threat.

The reconstruction of the lighthouses began in the twenty-first century, and was finished by 2019. Geodetic surveys were conducted and the old photographs were used in the reconstruction. The carved writings on the bricks were documented by the Pančevo's Cultural Monuments Protection Institute. The lighthouses are protected by the law as the Cultural Heritage of Great Importance.

== Flooding ==
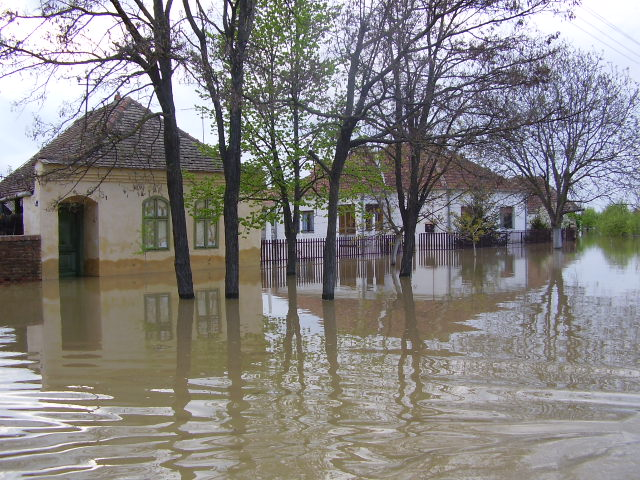
Flood in Jaša Tomić in 2005

After Banat, floods occur in rainy years. Especially devastating were the floods of 2005, when the villages Boka and Jaša Tomić were badly damaged. On 20 April 2005, a level of 844 centimeters (332 in) was recorded, the highest ever since the measurements began.

In the spring of 2007 works on the elevation of the embankments on both banks of the river began, 11.5 kilometers (7.1 mi) on the right bank and 13.2 kilometers (8.2 mi) on the left. The embankments will be 30–70 cm (12–28 in) higher than they are now and being higher than 8.5 m (28 ft) should prevent any future floodings.

In some parts of the low, marshy areas created by the floods, several fish-filled lakes have been created, most notably at Banatski Despotovac, Uzdin, Sakule and Slatina.

== Tributaries ==
The following rivers are tributaries to the river Timiș:

Left: Brebu, Slatina, Goleț, Bucoșnița, Cerneț, Petroșnița, Valea Mare, Vălișoara, Măcicaș, Vâna Secănească, Vâna Mare, Spaia, Știuca, Cernabora, Timișana, Timișina, Șurgani, Sariș, Pogăniș, Timișul Mort, Lanca Birda, Bârzava/Brzava

Right: Semenic, Teregova, Criva, Pârâul Rece, Feneș, Armeniș, Sadovița, Ilova, Groapa Copaciului, Bolvașnița, Zlagna, Sebeș, Potoc, Bistra, Pleșa, Calova, Maciovița, Vălișor, Tincova, Nădrag, Slatina, Măguri, Tapia, Iarcoș, Timișaț

== Settlements ==
=== Romania ===
Major cities in its Romanian course are Caransebeș and Lugoj, smaller places include (from source to mouth):

- Teregova, Armeniș, Slatina-Timiș, Bucoșnița, Buchin, Caransebeș, Constantin Daicoviciu, Sacu, Gavojdia, Lugoj, Coșteiu, Moșnița Nouă, Șag, Parța, Peciu Nou

Timișoara has its name derived from the river Timiș meaning the fortress of Timiș. However the town of Timiș City, even though its name may indicate it, is not a settlement on the river, but on another Romanian-Serbian river, Bega.

=== Serbia ===
From source to mouth: Jaša Tomić, Šurjan, Boka, Sečanj, Neuzina, Banatski Despotovac, Botoš, Tomaševac, Orlovat, Uzdin, Idvor, Farkaždin, Sakule, Čenta, Baranda, Opovo, Sefkerin, Glogonj, Jabuka, Pančevo

After the Austrians officially took over the lands north of the Sava and Danube in the early 18th century, at the Timiș' mouth into the Danube, there was a derelict Ottoman stockade, surrounded by the palisades. In 1716 the Austrians began construction of the new, larger proper fortress, and finished it in 1720. It was a pentagon shaped structure built for artillery warfare., with brick-layered bastions, triangular ramparts, and a pontoon bridge across the Timiș. It resembled the Belgrade Fortress, and bailey of the Petrovaradin Fortress.

Settlement which developed within the fortress was the core of modern Panćevo. One of the stipulations of the 1739 Austrian-Ottoman Treaty of Belgrade was that Austria had to demolish all fortifications built in the previous two decades. Pančevo Fortress was razed to the ground, with nothing surviving above the ground level, but the settlement remained as a border town. Old downtown of Pančevo, and its street grid, were shaped by the size, position and orientation of the fortress. During the reconstruction of the City Park in 2013, remains of the foundations and brick walls of the southern rampart were discovered.

== Pančevački Rit ==
The river's old mouth into the Danube was some 40 km (25 mi) to the north-west, between villages of Čenta and Surduk, thus it was shorter. Canal Karaš remained marking old river bed, and the area bounded by the old and new river beds and the Danube, is called Pančevački Rit (Pančevo Marsh). The 400 km^{2} (150 sq mi) large wetland was constantly flooded, but since World War II it has been drained part by part and almost half of it is turned into a very fertile patch of land, suitable especially for cultivating grains and vegetables. It is managed by Serbian largest agricultural company, "PKB Beograd", which almost exclusively provides food for 2 million people in wider Belgrade area, thus Pančevački Rit is commonly nicknamed Granary of Belgrade. Stockbreeding is also very intensive, and so are fishery and hunting.

Many meandering canals and bogs remained in the marsh: slow streams of Vizelj, Dunavac, Sibnica, Butuš, Rogoznica, Buk, Belanoš and Sebeš, and large bogs of Reva, Veliko Blato (2 km^{2} (0.77 sq mi)), Sebeš and Široka Bara. In the south, area ends with a river island (ada) Kožara (0.44 km^{2} (0.17 sq mi)).

After being almost uninhabited before 1945, today its population density is above average for Serbia as a whole, since some of the fastest growing suburbs of Belgrade (Borča, Padinska Skela and Krnjača) are built there. The whole area of Pančevački Rit belongs administratively to Belgrade's municipality of Palilula.

== Sources ==
- Mala Prosvetina Enciklopedija, Third edition (1985); Prosveta; ISBN 86-07-00001-2
- Jovan Đ. Marković (1990): Enciklopedijski geografski leksikon Jugoslavije; Svjetlost-Sarajevo; ISBN 86-01-02651-6
