= Imre Erőss =

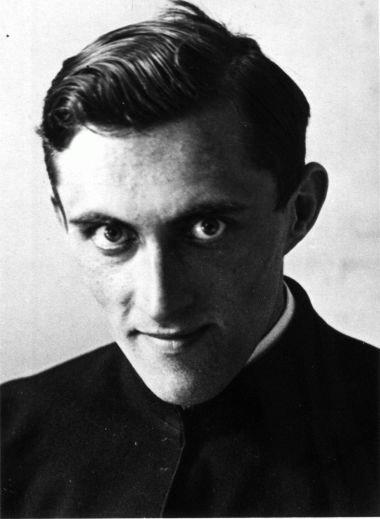

Imre Alfréd Erőss (7 July 1909 – 31 July 1950) was a Romanian cleric and Roman Catholic bishop.

Born into an ethnic Hungarian family in Prisian (Perestyén) in what is now Caraş-Severin County, he began his studies at the Piarist High School in Timișoara. His father objected to his wish of becoming a Jesuit, and so he continued his studies in Târgu Secuiesc. He began his theological education at the Roman Catholic Theological Institute of Alba Iulia before continuing in Rome from 1929 to 1937, being ordained a priest there in 1935. He was a hospital chaplain at Cluj in 1937 and supervised seminarians at Alba Iulia from 1938 to 1941 before returning to teach dogmatics at Cluj until 1944. From then until 1949, he taught World War II refugees at Zirc. In 1949, he was consecrated bishop in Bucharest. He died in a hospital in Cluj and was buried in Turda.

Erőss published a number of theological works.
