= Pleșoiu (disambiguation) =

Pleșoiu may refer to:

- Pleşoiu, a commune in Olt County, Romania
- Pleșoiu, a village in Livezi Commune, Vâlcea County, Romania
- Pleșoiu, a village in Nicolae Bălcescu Commune, Vâlcea County, Romania

== See also ==
- Pleșa (disambiguation)
- Pleși (disambiguation)
- Pleașa (disambiguation)
