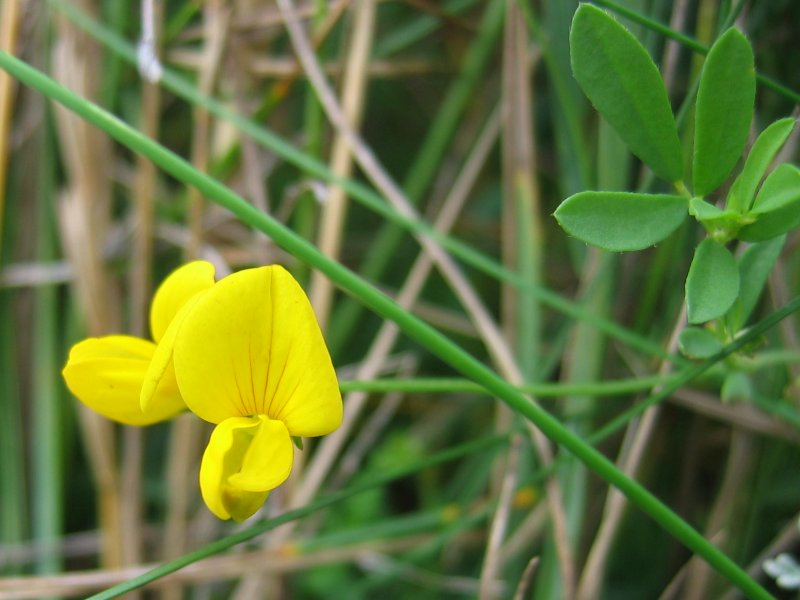

Scientific classification
- Kingdom: Plantae
- Clade: Tracheophytes
- Clade: Angiosperms
- Clade: Eudicots
- Clade: Rosids
- Order: Fabales
- Family: Fabaceae
- Subfamily: Faboideae
- Genus: Lotus
- Species: L. tenuis

Binomial name
- Lotus tenuis Waldst. & Kit. ex Willd.

Synonyms
- List: Dorycnium iberecum Koehne (1893); Lotus acutus Waldst. & Kit. ex Steud. (1821); Lotus campestris Schur (1877); Lotus corniculatus var. filicaulis (Durieu) Brand (1898); Lotus corniculatus var. longicaulis Martrin-Donos (1864); Lotus corniculatus subsp. tenuis (Waldst. & Kit. ex Willd.) Syme (1864); Lotus corniculatus var. tenuis (Waldst. & Kit. ex Willd.) Wahlenb. (1826); Lotus corniculatus proles tenuis (Waldst. & Kit. ex Willd.) Rouy (1899); Lotus corniculatus f. tenuifolius (L.) Pau (1900); Lotus corniculatus subsp. tenuifolius (L.) Hartm. (1846); Lotus corniculatus subsp. tenuifolius (L.) Gams (1923); Lotus corniculatus var. tenuifolius L. (1753); Lotus filicaulis Durieu (1847); Lotus glaber Mill. (1768); Lotus macbridei A.Nelson (1912); Lotus minor Bishop (1826); Lotus noeanus Boiss. (1856); Lotus tenuifolius (L.) Rchb. (1832); Lotus tenuifolius var. pubescens Meisn. (1844); Lotus tenuifolius var. ramosissimus Carion (1865)

= Lotus tenuis =

Plant species in the pea family

Lotus tenuis is a flowering plant of the pea family Fabaceae, native to western and southern Europe and southwest Asia. Some botanists treat it as a subspecies of Lotus corniculatus, as L. corniculatus subsp. tenuifolius.

Its tolerance of salt and poor soil make this plant useful for marginal conditions. It has become naturalised in many other locations, including the Pampas of Argentina, and parts of the United States.

Common names include narrowleaf trefoil, narrow-leaved bird's-foot-trefoil, slender trefoil, creeping trefoil, or prostrate trefoil.
