= Slatina-Timiș =

- Commune
- Sadova Veche village

- Coat of arms

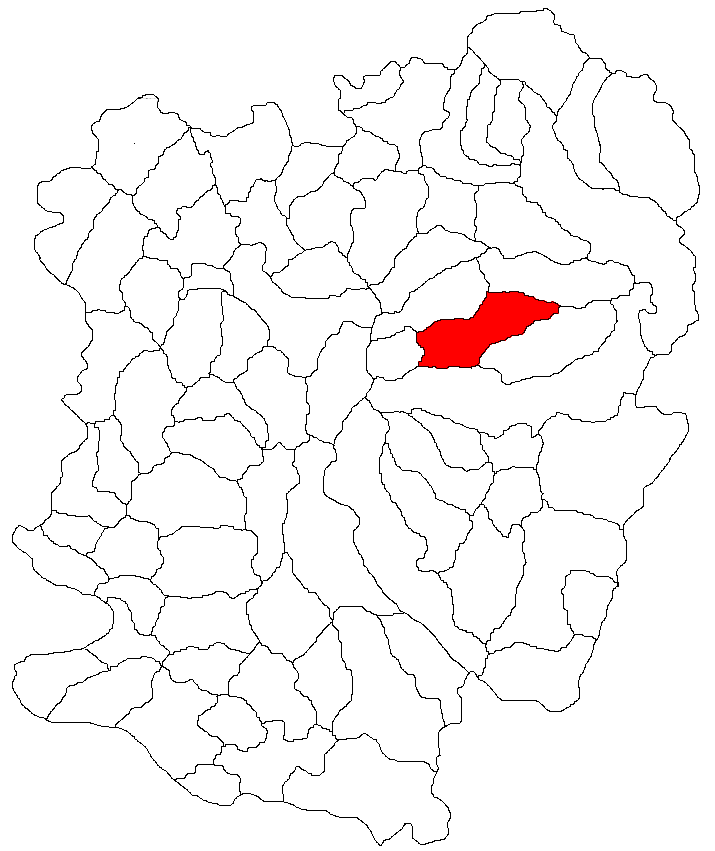
- Location in Caraș-Severin County

- Location in Romania
- Coordinates: 45°15′N 22°17′E
- Country: Romania
- County: Caraș-Severin

Government
  - Mayor (2024–2028): Gheorghe Roma (Ind.)
- Area: 151.1 km^{2} (58.3 sq mi)
- Elevation: 300 m (980 ft)
- Population (2021-12-01): 2,682
  - Density: 17.75/km^{2} (45.97/sq mi)
- Time zone: UTC+02:00 (EET)
  - Summer (DST): UTC+03:00 (EEST)
- Postal code: 327360
- Area code: (+40) 02 55
- Vehicle reg.: CS
- Website: www.slatina-timis.ro

Slatina-Timiș (Hungarian: Temesszlatina) is a commune in Caraș-Severin County, western Romania with a population of 2,682 people as of 2021. It is composed of four villages: Ilova (Illópatak), Sadova Nouă (Újszadova), Sadova Veche (Ószadova), and Slatina-Timiș.
