= Teregova =

- Commune
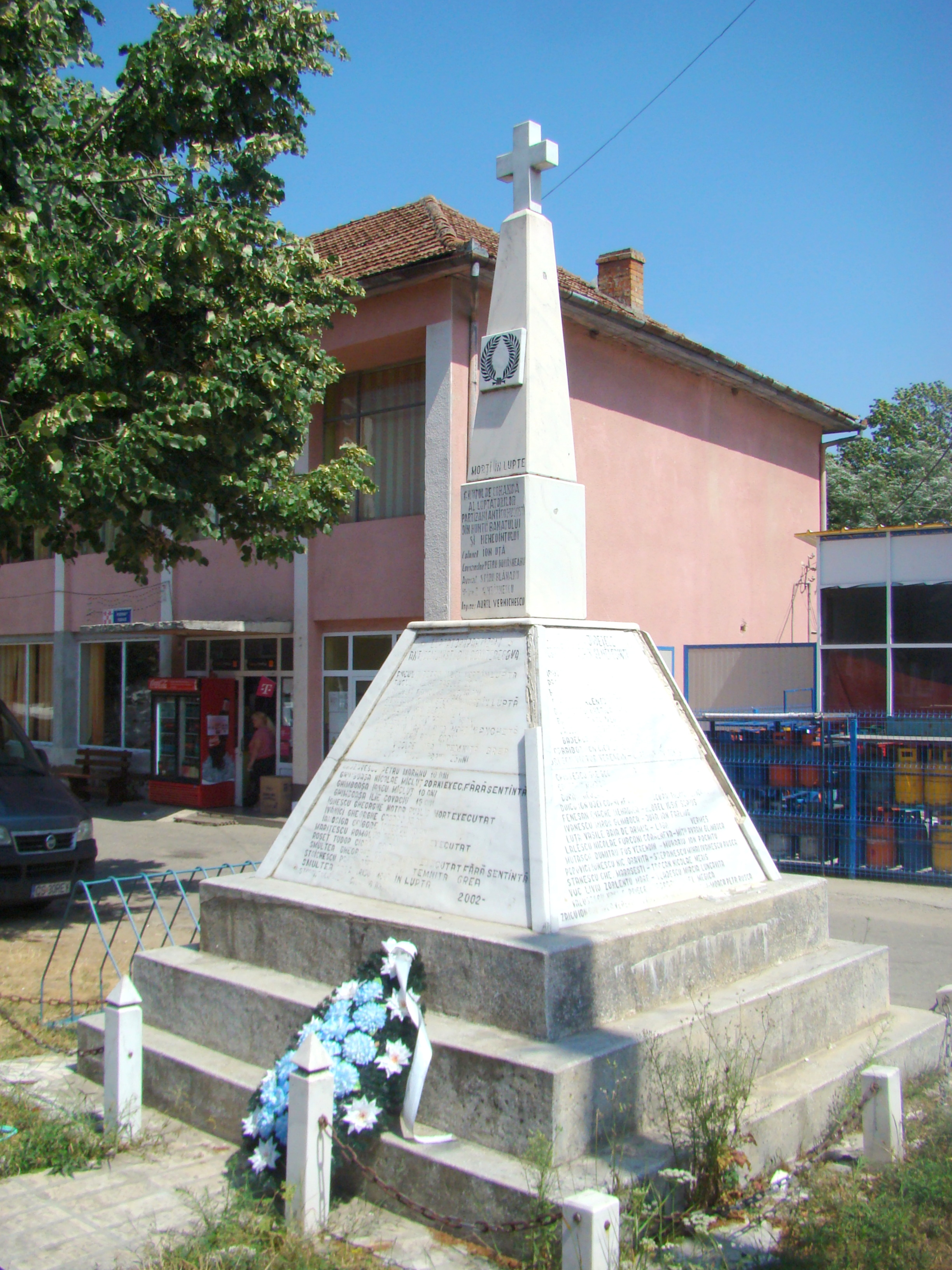
- Memorial commemorating Romanian anti-communist partisans

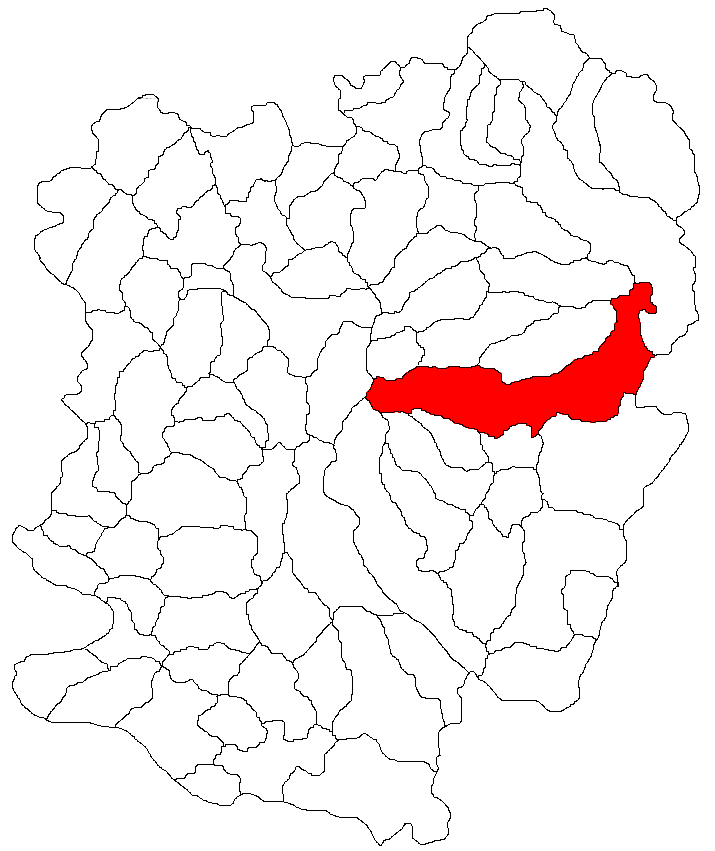
- Location in Caraș-Severin County

- Location in Romania
- Coordinates: 45°09′N 22°17′E
- Country: Romania
- County: Caraș-Severin

Government
  - Mayor (2020–2024): Maria Damian (PRO)
- Area: 331.02 km^{2} (127.81 sq mi)
- Elevation: 424 m (1,391 ft)
- Population (2021-12-01): 3,446
  - Density: 10.41/km^{2} (26.96/sq mi)
- Time zone: UTC+02:00 (EET)
  - Summer (DST): UTC+03:00 (EEST)
- Postal code: 327390
- Area code: (+40) 02 55
- Vehicle reg.: CS
- Website: teregova.ro

Teregova (Hungarian: Teregova) is a commune in Caraș-Severin County, Western Romania with a population of 3,446 as of 2021. It is composed of two villages, Rusca (Ruszka) and Teregova. It is situated in the historical region of Banat.

The commune is located in the east-central part of county, stretching eastwards to the border with Hunedoara County. It is situated at an altitude of 424 m (1,391 ft), at the foot of the Țarcu Mountains. The river Timiș flows through Rusca village; its right tributary, the river Teregova, joins the Timiș in the eponymous village.

== Natives ==
- Lajos Bebrits (1891–1963), Hungarian communist newspaper editor and politician

== See also ==
- Ad Pannonios (castra)
