= Pleașa =

Pleaşa may refer to several places in Romania:

- Pleaşa, a village in Bucov Commune, Prahova County
- Pleaşa, a village in Vlădeşti Commune, Vâlcea County

== See also ==
- Pleșa (disambiguation)
- Pleși (disambiguation)
- Pleșoiu (disambiguation)
