= Bucoșnița =

- Commune
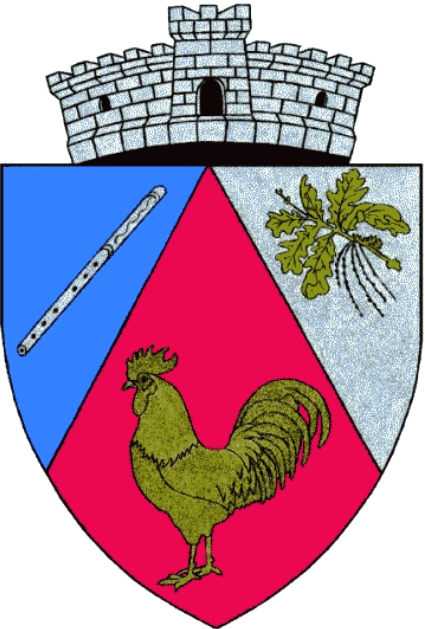
- Coat of arms

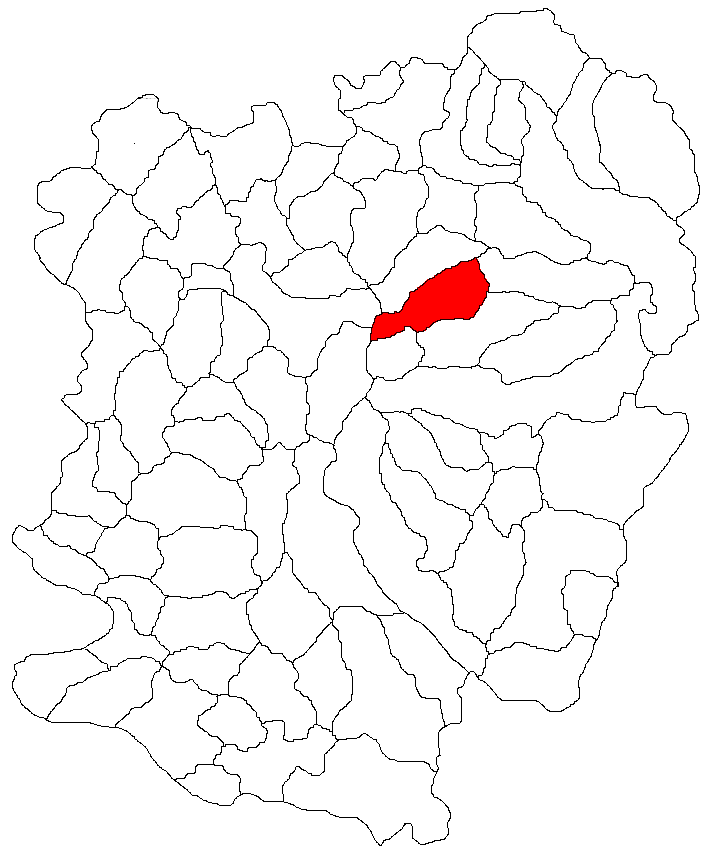
- Location in Caraș-Severin County

- Location in Romania
- Coordinates: 45°18′N 22°16′E
- Country: Romania
- County: Caraș-Severin

Government
  - Mayor (2024–2028): Vichente Suru (PRO)
- Area: 97.67 km^{2} (37.71 sq mi)
- Elevation: 265 m (869 ft)
- Population (2021-12-01): 2,642
  - Density: 27.05/km^{2} (70.06/sq mi)
- Time zone: UTC+02:00 (EET)
  - Summer (DST): UTC+03:00 (EEST)
- Postal code: 327060
- Area code: +(40) x55
- Vehicle reg.: CS
- Website: www.primariabucosnita.ro

Bucoșnița (Hungarian: Bokos) is a commune in Caraș-Severin County, western Romania, with a population of 2,642 as of 2021. It is composed of four villages: Bucoșnița, Goleț (Galacs), Petroșnița (Petresfalva), and Vălișoara (Temesvölgye). It is situated in the historical region of Banat.

The commune is situated at an altitude of 265 m (869 ft), in the foothills of the Țarcu and Semenic mountains, on the banks of the Timiș River. It is located in the central-north part of Caraș-Severin County, 14 km (8.7 mi) south of the municipality of Caransebeș and 56 km (35 mi) east of the county seat, Reșița.

Bucoșnița is crossed by the national road DN6 (part of European route E70), which links Bucharest with the Banat region. The Vălișoara and Petroșnița train stations serve the CFR Main Line 900, which connects the capital city with Timișoara.

Historical population
Year	Pop.	±%
1880	2,976	—
1910	3,965	+33.2%
1930	4,009	+1.1%
1977	3,857	−3.8%
2002	3,125	−19.0%
2011	2,978	−4.7%
2021	2,642	−11.3%
Source: Census data
