= Sacu =

- Commune
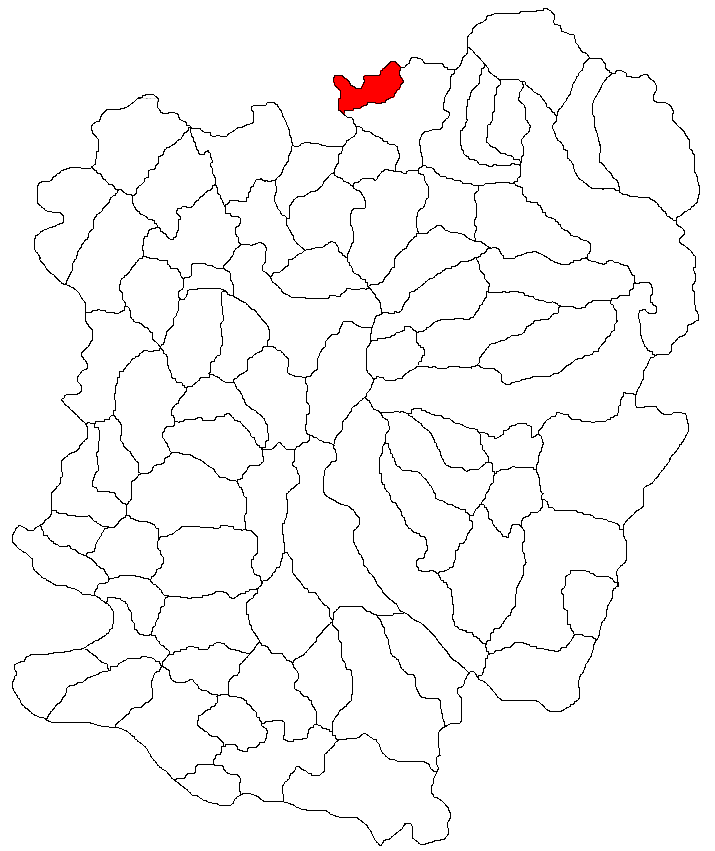
- Location in Caraș-Severin County

- Location in Romania
- Coordinates: 45°34′N 22°07′E
- Country: Romania
- County: Caraș-Severin
- Population (2021-12-01): 1,443
- Time zone: EET/EEST (UTC+2/+3)
- Vehicle reg.: CS

Sacu (Hungarian: Szákul) is a commune in Caraș-Severin County, western Romania with a population of 1681 people. It is composed of three villages: Sacu, Sălbăgelu Nou (Gyulatelep) and Tincova (Tinkova).
