= Știuca =

Știuca Щука
- Commune
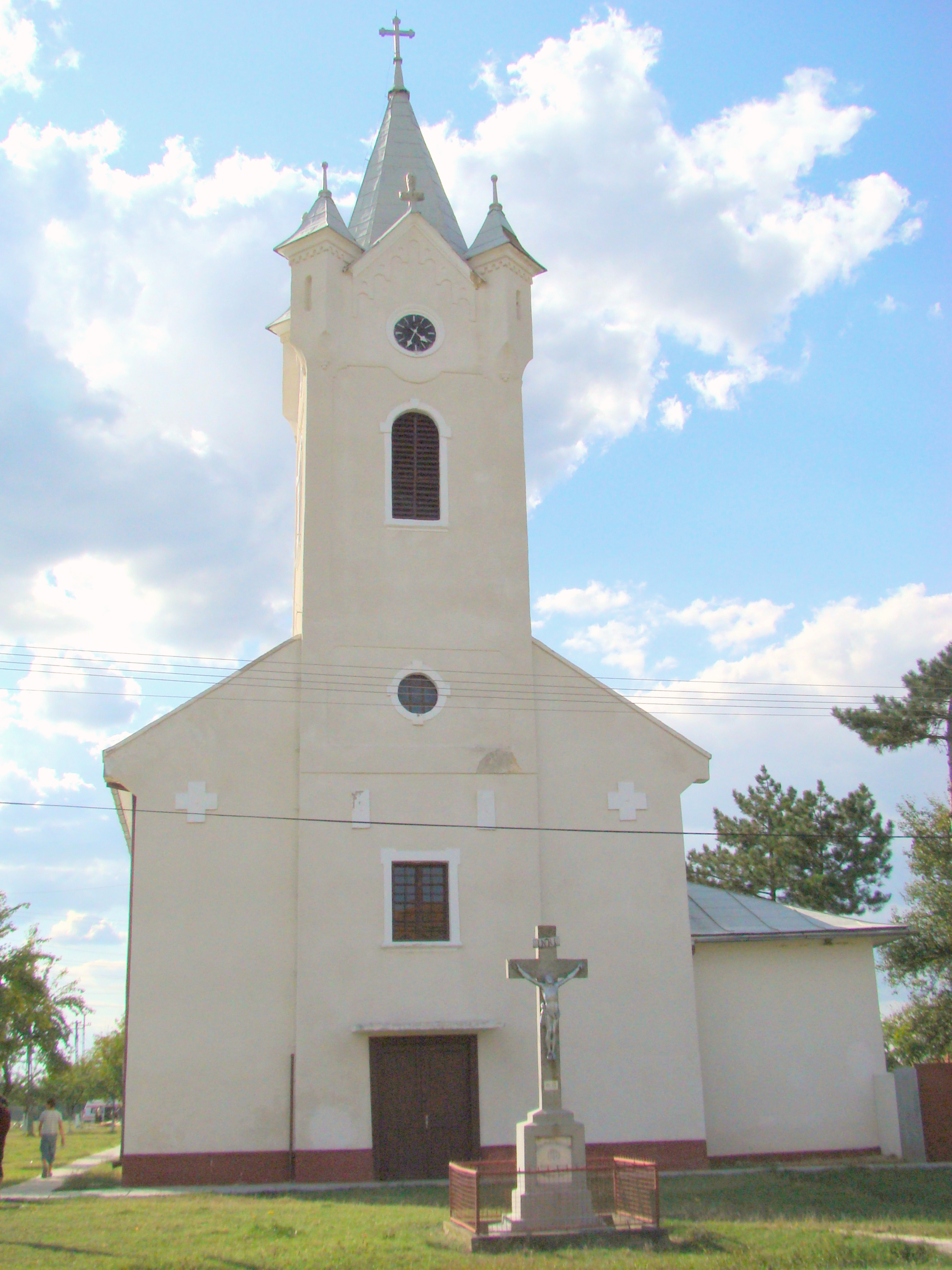
- The Roman Catholic church in Știuca

- Location in Timiș County

- Location in Romania
- Coordinates: 45°34′N 21°59′E
- Country: Romania
- County: Timiș

Government
  - Mayor (2004–): Vasile Bejera (PNL)
- Area: 94.52 km^{2} (36.49 sq mi)
- Population (2021-12-01): 2,160
  - Density: 22.9/km^{2} (59.2/sq mi)
- Time zone: UTC+02:00 (EET)
  - Summer (DST): UTC+03:00 (EEST)
- Postal code: 307400–307403
- Vehicle reg.: TM
- Website: www.primariastiuca.ro

Știuca (Romanian for "pike"; Ukrainian: Щука; Hungarian: Csukás; German: Ebendorf) is a commune in Timiș County, Romania. It is composed of four villages: Dragomirești, Oloșag, Știuca (commune seat) and Zgribești.

== Geography ==
=== Relief ===
The commune of Știuca is situated in the southeastern part of Timiș County, within the Lugoj Plain, approximately 14.1 km from Lugoj and 71 km from Timișoara. It lies in a mixed landscape of hills and plains. The plain covering the commune ranges in elevation from 80 to 100 meters and is characterized by numerous small, continuous or isolated depressions formed by water erosion or local ground subsidence. The hilly terrain, with elevations between 196 meters (around the Oloșag area) and 260 meters (near Zgribești and Dragomirești), belongs to the Sacoș Hills.

=== Hydrography ===
The hydrographic network of Știuca commune consists of several small streams, including:

- Știuchița Stream, which flows through the Știuca locality;
- Cernabora Stream, running through Dragomirești and Oloșag localities, featuring a flow regulation dam on the Timiș River;
- Valea Iancului Stream and Seliște Stream, both located within the Zgribești locality.

In the hilly areas of the commune, there are natural drinking water springs that residents use for personal needs, such as consumption or watering animals.

=== Climate ===
The climate in the area reflects the topoclimatic characteristics of the Banat hills, featuring mild winters, hot summers, and two main precipitation peaks—in May–June and December—along with a frequent presence of southern air masses. It falls under the temperate continental climate type with Mediterranean influences, creating favorable conditions for agricultural development.

Summers are relatively warm, with average temperatures around 22–23°C in July, while winters are generally mild. Spring and autumn tend to be brief. Annual rainfall exceeds 800 mm, though it is not particularly abundant. Among the high-risk weather phenomena in the region are hailstorms and frost accumulation, both of which can negatively impact vegetation.

=== Flora and fauna ===
The fauna of the commune is diverse and typical of both plains and hilly regions, with a rich presence of wild animals. Commonly encountered species include hare, pygmy mouse, badger, fox, wild boar, and deer. The area also boasts a varied bird population, featuring species such as the pheasant, hoopoe, nightingale, blackbird, leaf warbler, woodpecker, turtle dove, roller, and golden oriole. Reptiles are commonly found across the region—in forests, cultivated fields, and pastures. Notable species include the gray lizard, green lizard, slow worm, house snake, water snake, and salamander. The aquatic fauna includes fish such as barbel, bleak, minnow, sun perch, nase, and Kessler's gudgeon.

The local vegetation is characteristic of plain and hill forests, specifically within the oak subzone. In areas where forests have remained intact—mainly on lands unsuitable for cultivation due to terrain or excess moisture—dominant tree species include Quercus cerris (Austrian oak), Quercus robur (pedunculate oak), and Quercus pubescens (downy oak). These are commonly found in association with Carpinus betulus (hornbeam), Tilia tomentosa (silver linden), Cornus mas (cornel), Alnus glutinosa (alder), Corylus avellana (hazel), and Prunus spinosa (blackthorn).

In the broad valleys where groundwater lies closer to the surface, vegetation consists of clusters of Salix alba (white willow), Salix × fragilis (crack willow), Populus alba (white poplar), Populus nigra (black poplar), Populus italica (pyramidal poplar), Alnus glutinosa (alder), Clematis vitalba (old man's beard), and Rosa canina (dog rose). In stabilized ravines, common species include Robinia pseudoacacia (black locust), Pyrus pyraster (wild pear), Vitis sylvestris (wild grape), Gleditsia triacanthos (honey locust), Prunus spinosa (blackthorn), and Rosa canina (dog rose).

== History ==
The first mention of Știuca dates back to 1585, but it is about praedium or terra Stukatth and not about a cohesive locality. The village was practically founded by German settlers between 1784 and 1787. They named it Ebendorf, a name it bore until 1901. The German settlers came from various regions, the first being from Luxembourg, followed by those from Württemberg, Bavaria and Austria. Slovaks and Germans from Bohemia later settled. Through school and church, through mixed marriages, the Slovaks were assimilated over time by the German population. The Știuca–Sălbăgel estate was once owned by the barons of the Brukenthal house. In 1786, 60 families, totaling 214 people, mostly from Luxembourg, settled in Știuca. From 1867, during the Hungarian administration, the village was named Csukás. Since 1919 the village has been called Știuca. Starting in 1966, Ukrainians from Maramureș County, which currently represents the majority of the population, began to settle in Știuca. Most ethnic Germans emigrated to the FRG in 1990.

== Demographics ==
Ethnic composition (2021)
1. Ukrainians (56.8%)
2. Romanians (36.0%)
3. Others (7.19%)
Religious composition (2011)
1. Pentecostals (31.4%)
2. Old Believers (29.4%)
3. Orthodox (29.4%)
4. Baptists (1.57%)
5. Unknown (6.57%)
6. Others (1.55%)

Știuca had a population of 2,160 inhabitants at the 2021 census, up 19.14% from the 2011 census. Most inhabitants are Ukrainians (56.8%), with a minority of Romanians (36.01%). In terms of religion, there is no majority religion, the inhabitants being Pentecostals (31.43%), Old Believers (29.44%), Orthodox (29.44%) and Baptists (1.57%). For 6.57% of the population, religious affiliation is unknown.

| Census | | Ethnic composition |
| Year | Population | Romanians | Hungarians | Germans | Ukrainians | Slovaks |
|---|---|---|---|---|---|---|
| 1880 | 2,896 | 2,028 | 140 | 693 | – | 1 |
| 1890 | 3,182 | 2,220 | 95 | 749 | – | 95 |
| 1900 | 3,644 | 2,402 | 273 | 936 | – | 12 |
| 1910 | 4,573 | 2,485 | 200 | 966 | 894 | 5 |
| 1920 | 3,135 | 2,192 | 52 | 876 | – | – |
| 1930 | 3,250 | 2,211 | 47 | 972 | 5 | 1 |
| 1941 | 3,135 | 2,135 | 36 | 943 | – | – |
| 1956 | 2,672 | 1,868 | 6 | 771 | 25 | – |
| 1966 | 2,152 | 1,426 | 11 | 640 | 74 | – |
| 1977 | 1,949 | 995 | 5 | 367 | 576 | – |
| 1992 | 1,628 | 658 | 7 | 62 | 898 | – |
| 2002 | 1,838 | 639 | 6 | 18 | 1,170 | – |
| 2011 | 1,813 | 618 | 9 | 11 | 1,139 | – |
| 2021 | 2,160 | 778 | 4 | 4 | 1,227 | – |

== Politics and administration ==
The commune of Voiteg is administered by a mayor and a local council composed of 10 councilors. The mayor, Vasile Bejera, from the National Liberal Party, has been in office since 2004. As from the 2024 local elections, the local council has the following composition by political parties:

| Party | Seats | Composition |
|---|---|---|
| National Liberal Party | 3 | |
| Alliance for the Union of Romanians | 3 | |
| Social Democratic Party | 3 | |
| Green Party | 1 | |

== Economy ==
The primary economic activities of the commune's residents—and their main sources of income—are agriculture, trade, construction, along with various secondary economic pursuits. Cereal cultivation occupies the largest share of agricultural land, followed by technical crops and fruit tree orchards. The soil in Știuca commune is particularly well-suited for growing wheat, corn, barley, oats, and sunflower.

== Gallery ==
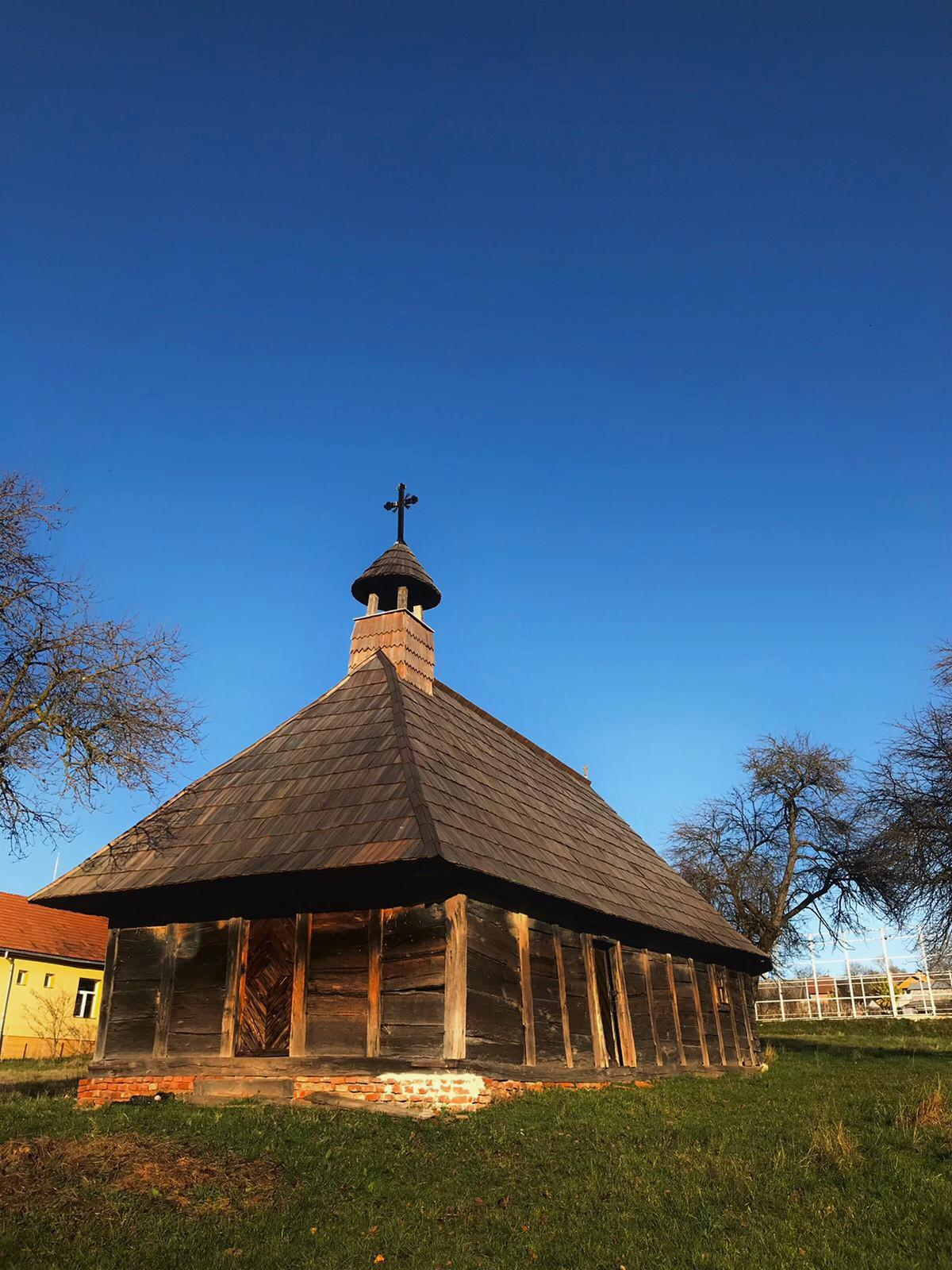
The wooden church in Dragomirești

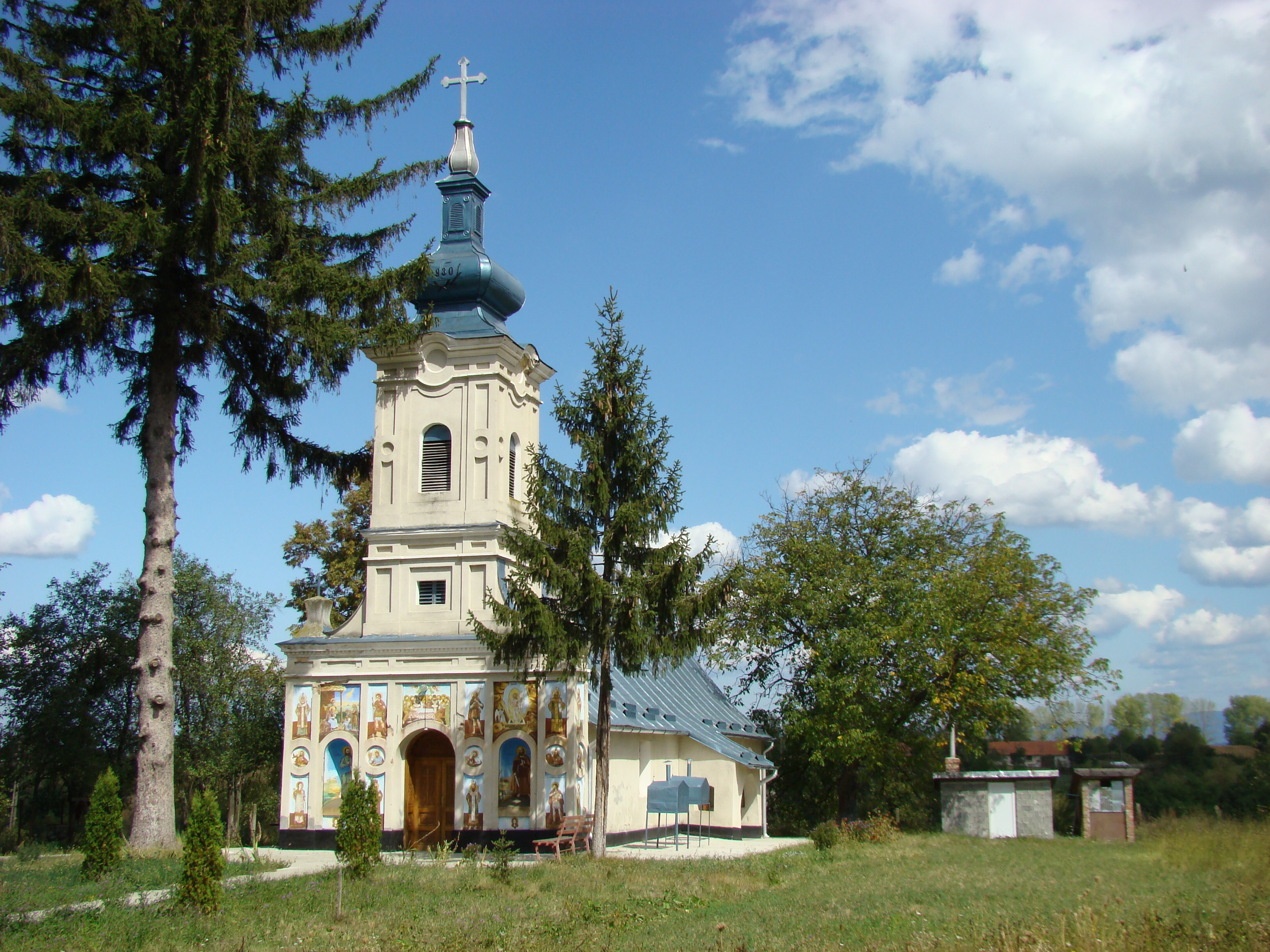
The Orthodox church in Oloșag

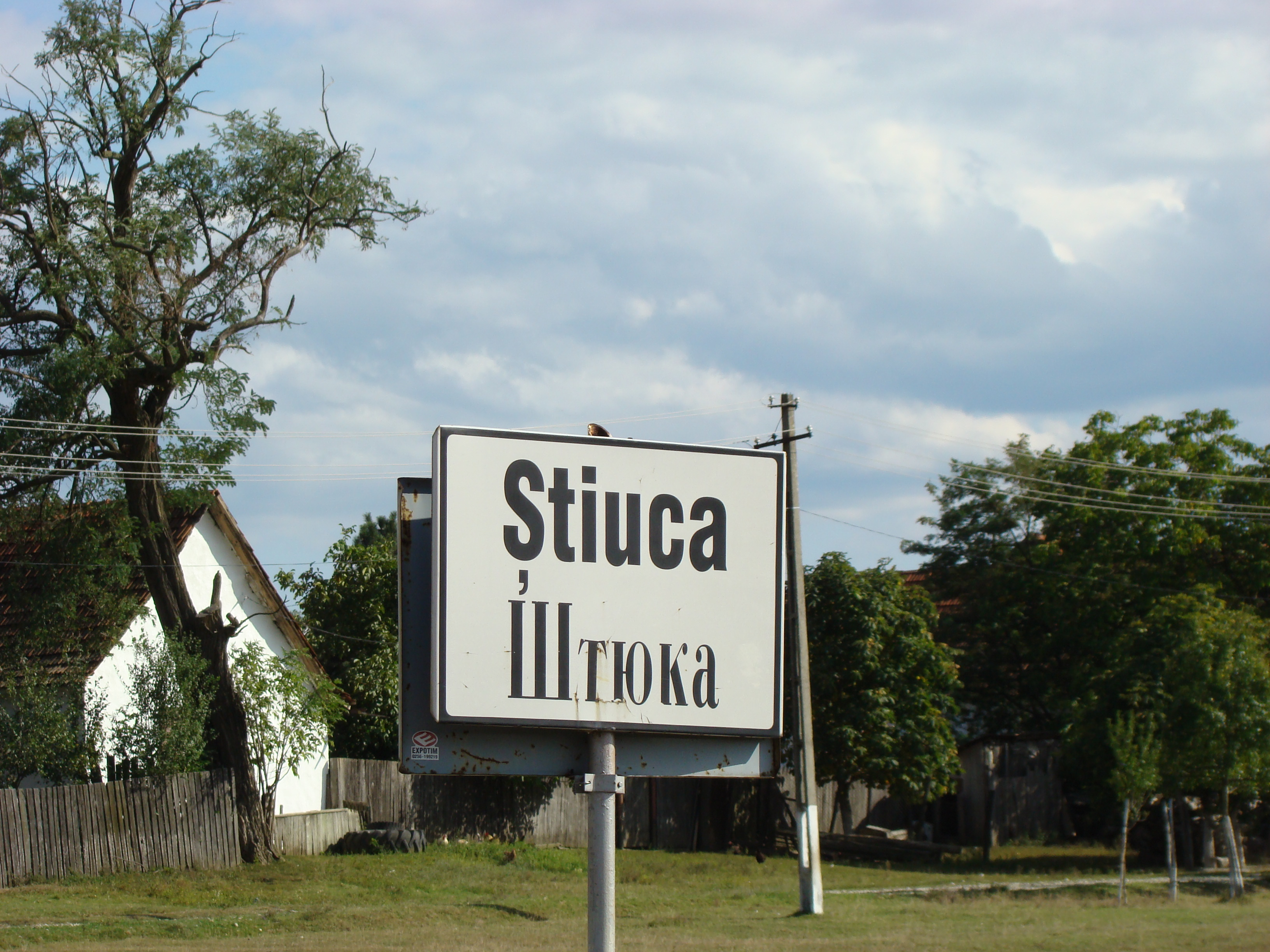
Bilingual sign at the entrance to Știuca

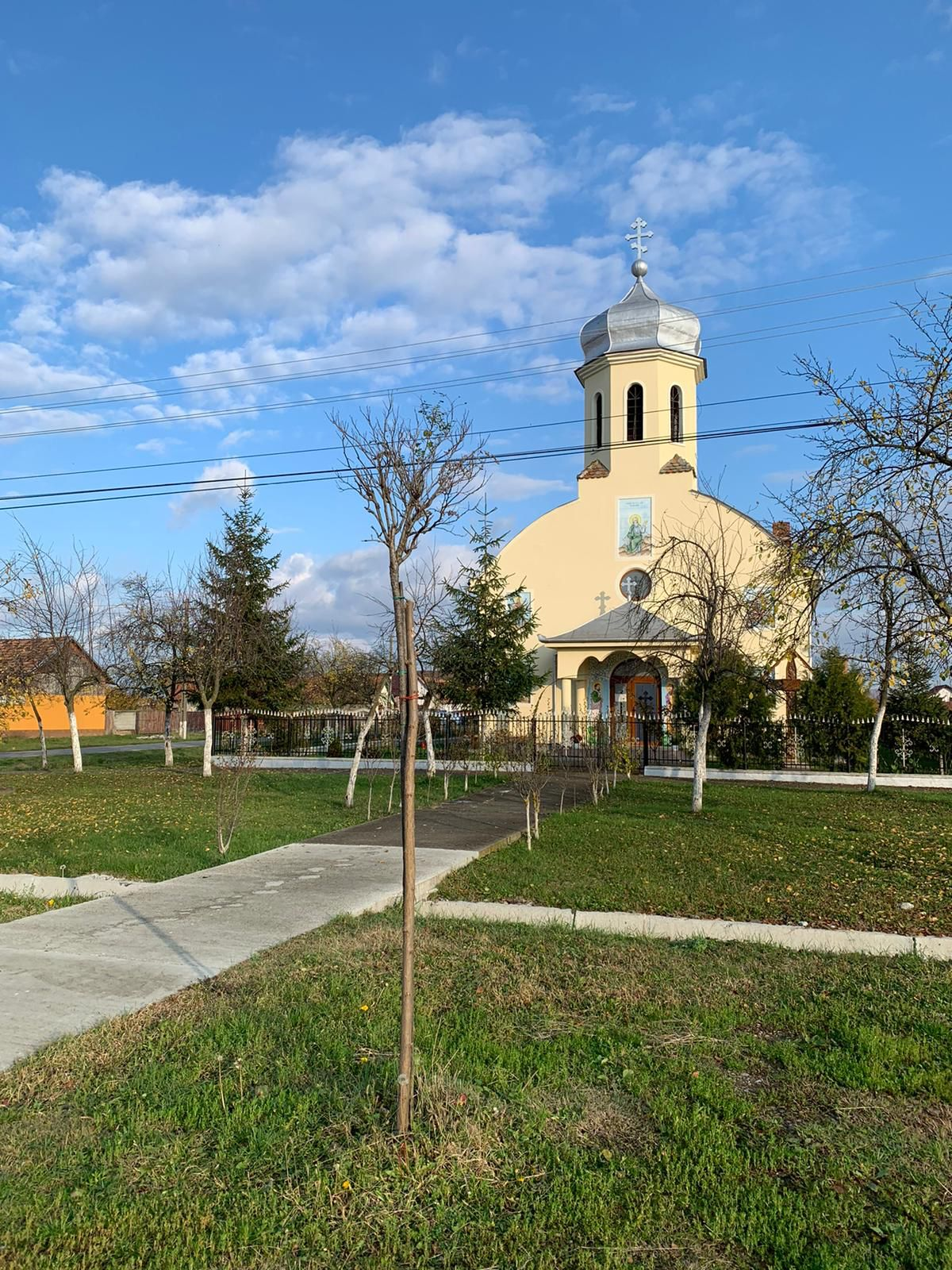
The Orthodox church in Știuca
