= Constantin Daicoviciu, Caraș-Severin =

Constantin Daicoviciu
- Commune
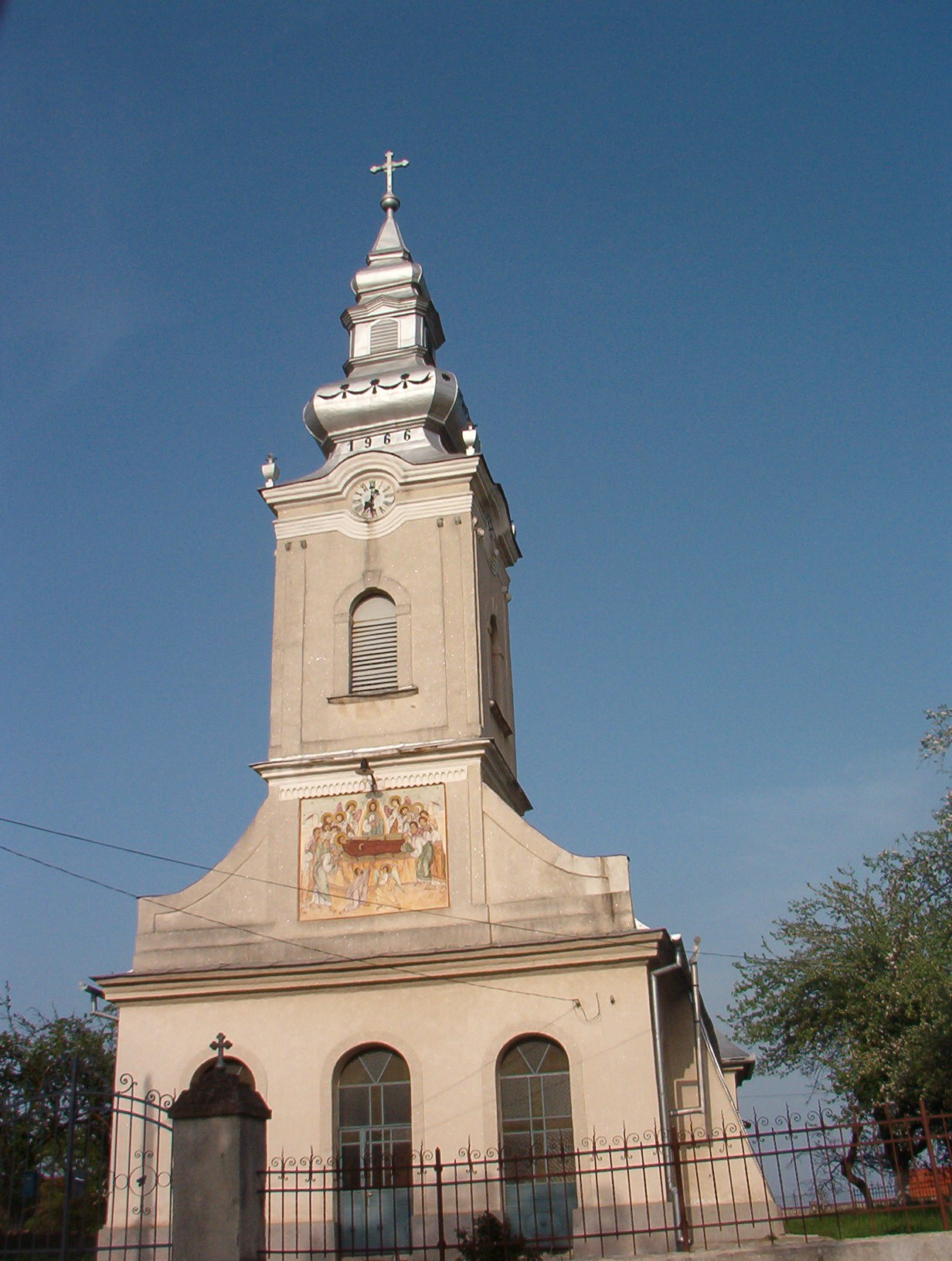
- Church in Mâtnicu Mare

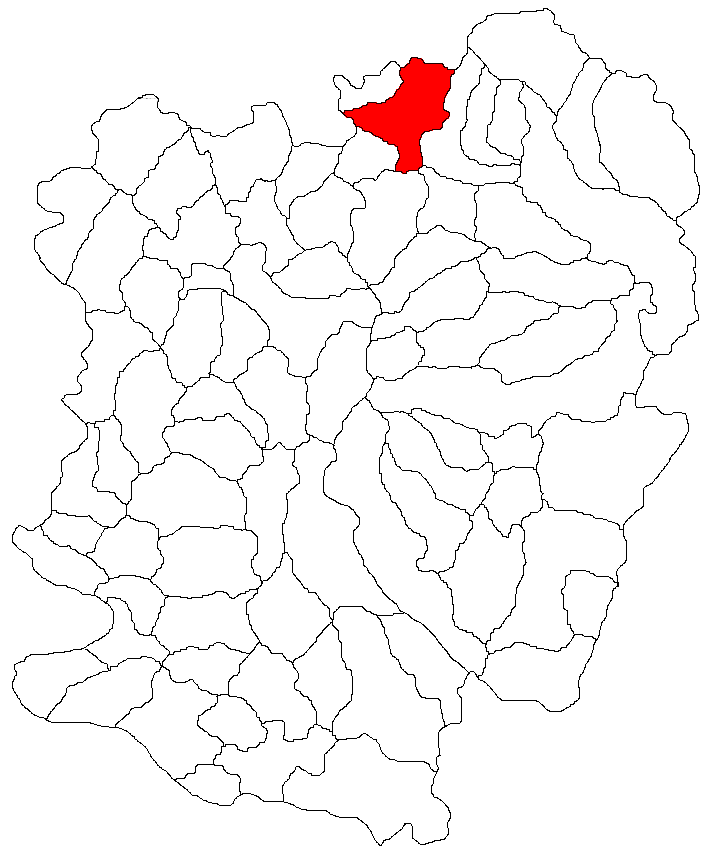
- Location in Caraș-Severin County

- Location in Romania
- Coordinates: 45°33′N 22°09′E
- Country: Romania
- County: Caraș-Severin

Government
  - Mayor (2024–2028): Daniel Boambeș (PSD)
- Area: 105.29 km^{2} (40.65 sq mi)
- Elevation: 160 m (520 ft)
- Population (2021-12-01): 2,649
  - Density: 25.16/km^{2} (65.16/sq mi)
- Time zone: UTC+02:00 (EET)
  - Summer (DST): UTC+03:00 (EEST)
- Postal code: 327090
- Area code: +(40) 02 55
- Vehicle reg.: CS
- Website: primariaconstantindaicoviciu.ro

Constantin Daicoviciu (until 1973 Căvăran; Hungarian: Kavarán) is a commune in Caraș-Severin County, western Romania with a population of 2,649 as of 2021. It is composed of six villages: Constantin Daicoviciu, Maciova (Mácsova), Mâtnicu Mare (Nagymutnok), Peștere (Krassóbarlang), Prisaca (Gyepesfalu), and Zăgujeni (Zaguzsén). It is situated in the historical region of Banat.

The commune is located in the northern part of the county, at a distance of 18 km (11 mi) from Caransebeș and 56 km (35 mi) from the county seat, Reșița.

Constantin Daicoviciu is situated on the Căile Ferate Române Line 900, which runs from Bucharest to Jimbolia.

Historical population
Year	Pop.	±%
2002	2,946	—
2011	2,692	−8.6%
2021	2,649	−1.6%
Source: Census data

== Natives ==
- Constantin Daicoviciu (1898–1973), historian and archaeologist, namesake of the present-day commune
- Otto Roth (1884–1956), lawyer and journalist, leader of the Banat Republic
