= Buchin =

- Commune
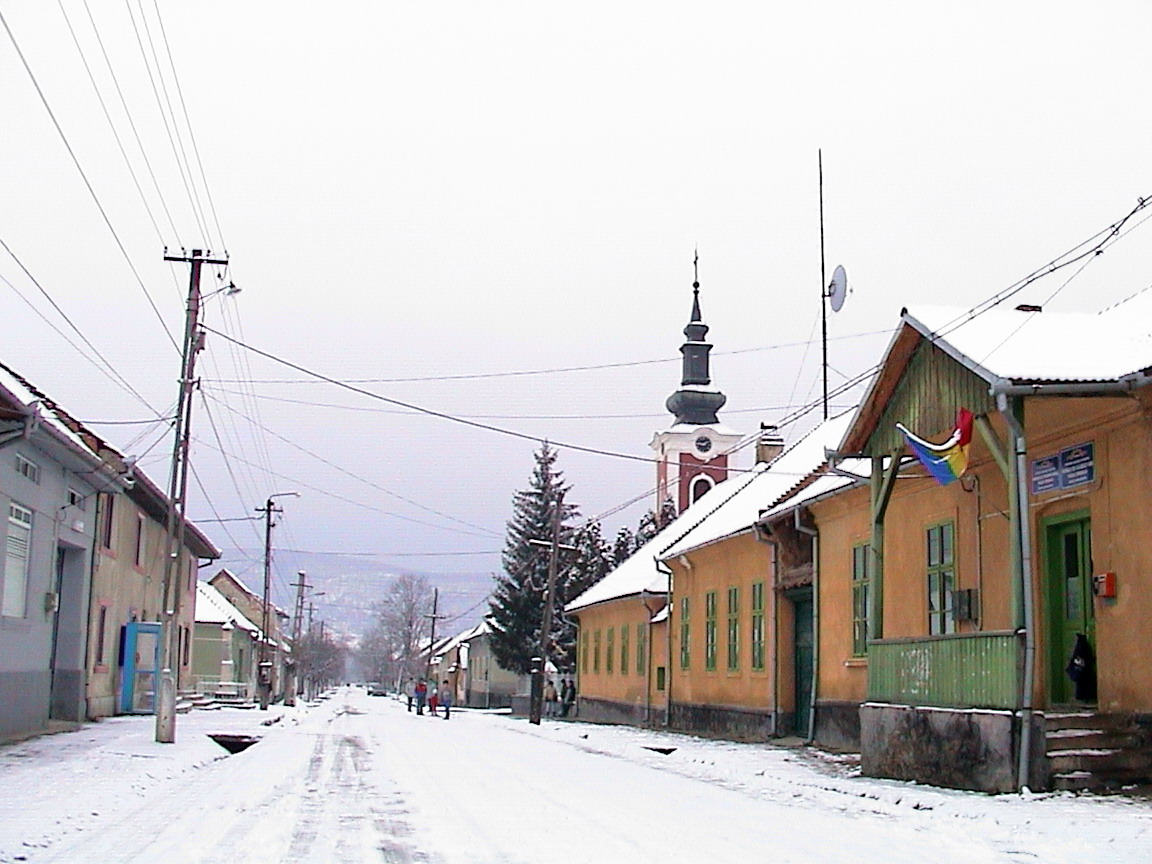
- Valea Timișului

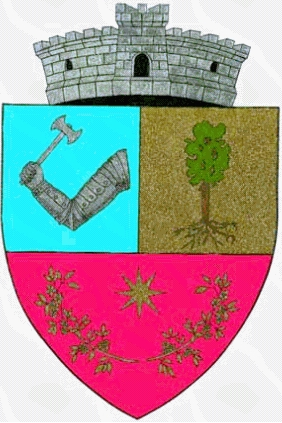
- Coat of arms

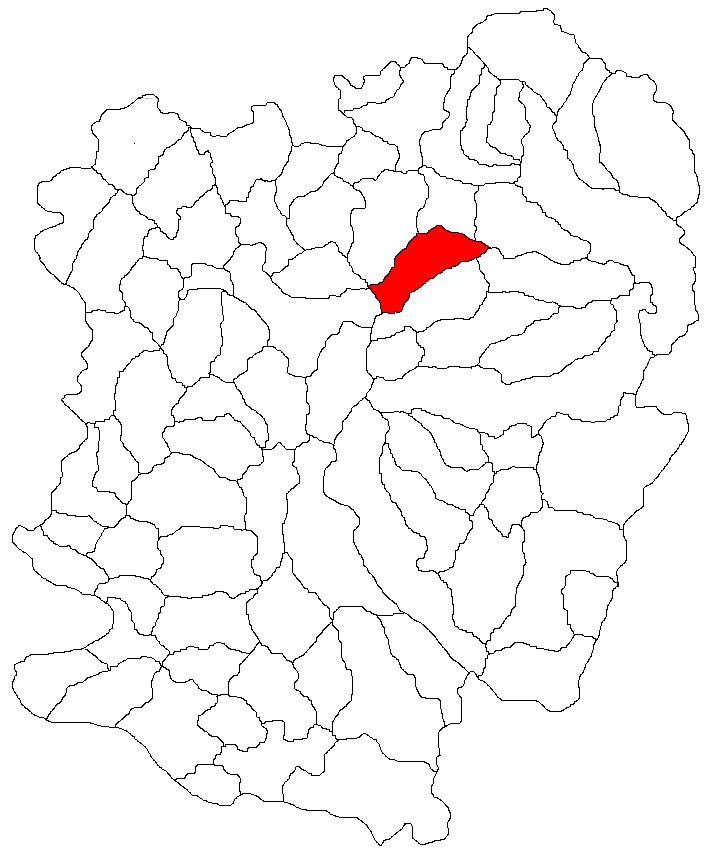
- Location in Caraș-Severin County

- Location in Romania
- Coordinates: 45°22′N 22°15′E
- Country: Romania
- County: Caraș-Severin

Government
  - Mayor (2024–2028): Gheorghe Coilă (PSD)
- Area: 82.35 km^{2} (31.80 sq mi)
- Elevation: 225 m (738 ft)
- Population (2021-12-01): 1,594
  - Density: 19.36/km^{2} (50.13/sq mi)
- Time zone: UTC+02:00 (EET)
  - Summer (DST): UTC+03:00 (EEST)
- Postal code: 327055
- Area code: (+40) 0255
- Vehicle reg.: CS
- Website: primariabuchin.ro

Buchin (Hungarian: Bökény) is a commune in Caraș-Severin County, western Romania with a population of 1,594 as of 2021. It is composed of five villages: Buchin, Lindenfeld (Karánberek; German: Lindenfeld), Poiana (Sebesmező), Prisian (Perestyén), and Valea Timișului (Körpa). It is situated in the historical region of Banat.

Lindenfeld village has been depopulated since 1998.

Historical population
Year	Pop.	±%
1880	2,960	—
1890	3,197	+8.0%
1910	3,821	+19.5%
1930	3,608	−5.6%
1941	3,534	−2.1%
1977	2,975	−15.8%
1992	2,319	−22.1%
2002	2,147	−7.4%
2011	2,039	−5.0%
2021	1,594	−21.8%
Source: Census data

== Natives ==
- Imre Erőss (1909–1950), Roman Catholic bishop
