= Livezi, Vâlcea =

Livezi
- Commune
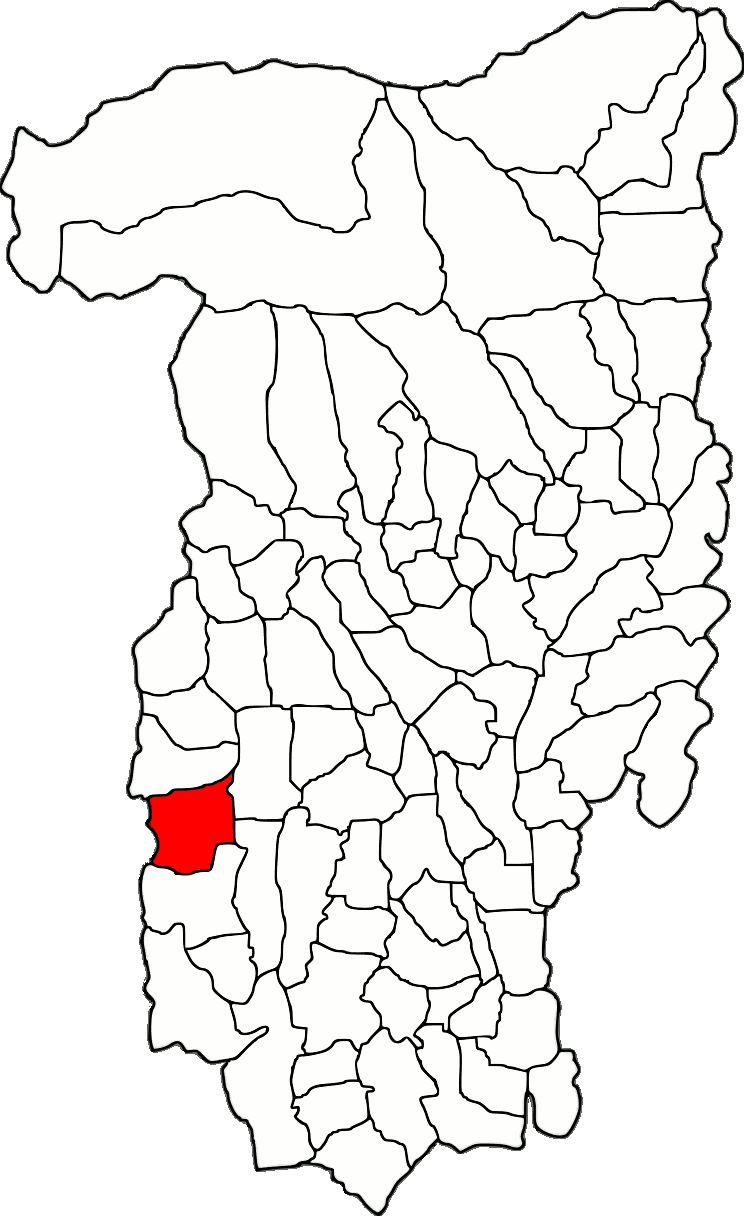
- Location in Vâlcea County

- Location in Romania
- Coordinates: 44°50′40″N 23°49′30″E
- Country: Romania
- County: Vâlcea
- Area: 59.69 km^{2} (23.05 sq mi)
- Population (2021-12-01): 2,014
  - Density: 33.74/km^{2} (87.39/sq mi)
- Time zone: UTC+02:00 (EET)
  - Summer (DST): UTC+03:00 (EEST)
- Vehicle reg.: VL

Livezi is a commune located in Vâlcea County, Oltenia, Romania. It is composed of seven villages: Livezi, Părăușani, Pârâienii de Jos, Pârâienii de Mijloc, Pârâienii de Sus, Pleșoiu and Tina.
