= Lozna =

Lozna may refer to:

== Settlements ==
- Lozna (Banovići), a village in Banovići, Bosnia and Herzegovina
- Lozna, Bijelo Polje, Montenegro
- Lozna, Botoșani, a commune in Botoşani County, Romania
- Lozna, Sălaj, a commune in Sălaj County, Romania
- Lozna (Trstenik), a village in Serbia

== Streams ==
- Lozna (Rusca), a tributary of the Rusca in Caraș-Severin County, Romania
- Lozna (Someș), a tributary of the Someș in Sălaj County, Romania
- Lozna Mare, a source river of the Lozna in Caraș-Severin County, Romania
- Lozna Mică, a source river of the Lozna in Caraș-Severin County, Romania

== See also ==
- Liozna, a town in Belarus
