= Zăvoi =

- Commune
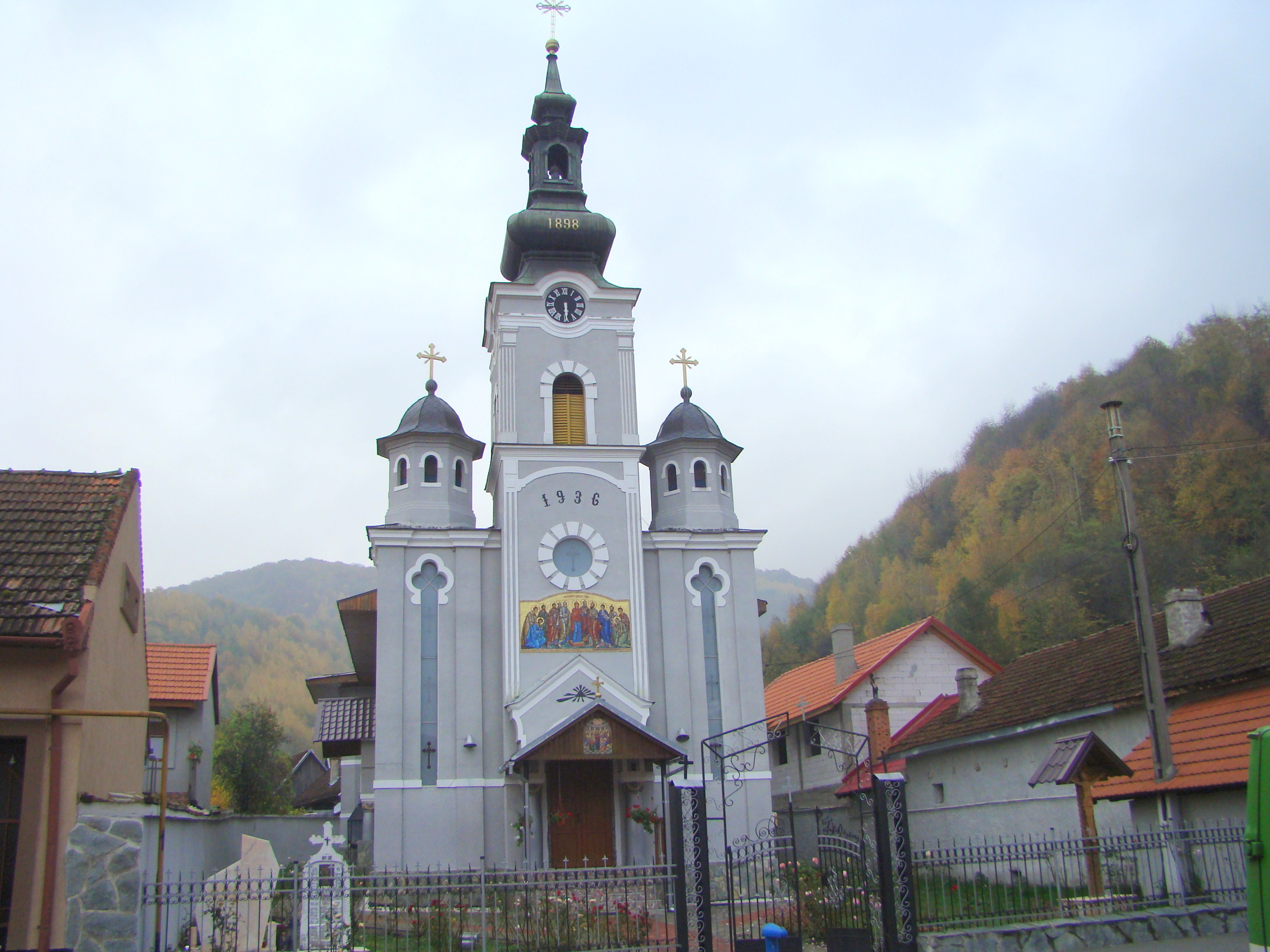
- Church of the Pentecost in Măru

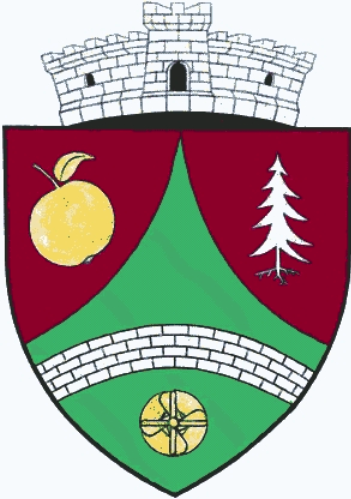
- Coat of arms

- Location in Caraș-Severin County

- Location in Romania
- Coordinates: 45°31′N 22°25′E
- Country: Romania
- County: Caraș-Severin

Government
  - Mayor (2024–2028): Iustin-Doru Cîrde (PNL)
- Area: 389.2 km^{2} (150.3 sq mi)
- Elevation: 302 m (991 ft)
- Population (2021-12-01): 3,514
  - Density: 9.029/km^{2} (23.38/sq mi)
- Time zone: UTC+02:00 (EET)
  - Summer (DST): UTC+03:00 (EEST)
- Postal code: 327435
- Area code: (+40) 02 55
- Vehicle reg.: CS
- Website: comuna-zavoi.ro

Zăvoi (until 1950 Zăvoiu; Hungarian: Závoly) is a commune in Caraș-Severin County, western Romania with a population of 3,514 as of 2021. It is composed of seven villages: 23 August, Măgura (until 1960 Crâjma; Korcsoma), Măru (Almafa), Poiana Mărului (Almafatelep), Valea Bistrei (Bisztranagyvölgy), Voislova (Szörénybalázsd), and Zăvoi.

== Geography ==
The commune is situated in the eastern part of the historical region of Banat, between the Poiana Ruscă Mountains to the north and Muntele Mic to the south, on the banks of the river Bistra. The river Rusca discharges into the Bistra in Voislova village, while the river Bistra Mărului flows through Poiana Mărului and Măru villages.

Zăvoi is located in the northeastern part of the county, on the border with Gorj and Hunedoara counties. It lies at a distance of 5 km (3.1 mi) from Oțelu Roșu, 23 km (14 mi) from Caransebeș, and 65 km (40 mi) from the county seat, Reșița.

The commune borders Rusca Montană commune to the north, the town of Oțelu Roșu and Obreja commune to the northwest, Turnu Ruieni commune to the west, Bolvașnița commune to the southwest, Teregova commune and Gorj County to the south, Hunedoara County to the southeast, Băuțar commune to the east, and Marga commune to the northeast.

Zăvoi is traversed west to east by national road DN68, which connects Caransebeș to the town of Hațeg in Hunedoara County; the portion of the road that runs through the commune was upgraded in October 2020.

The Castra of Zăvoi is a Roman fort located on the territory of the commune.

== Demographics ==
According to the 2021 census, Zăvoi had a population of 3,514; of those, 84.7% were Romanians, 4.7% were Roma, and 10.6% were of unknown ethnicity. The population density was 9/km^{2}.
