= Șucu =

- Location within Romania

Location
- Country: Romania
- Counties: Caraș-Severin County
- Villages: Poiana Mărului

Physical characteristics
- Source: Țarcu Mountains
- Mouth: Bistra Mărului
  - location: Poiana Mărului
  - coordinates: 45.4022°N 22.5416°E
- Length: 16 km (9.9 mi)
- Basin size: 79 km^{2} (31 sq mi)

Basin features
- Progression: Bistra Mărului→ Bistra→ Timiș→ Danube→ Black Sea
- Tributaries
  - left: Olteana

The Șucu (in its upper course also: Șuculețu) is a left tributary of the river Bistra Mărului in Romania. It flows into the Bistra Mărului in Poiana Mărului. Its length is 16 km (9.9 mi) and its basin size is 79 km^{2} (31 sq mi).
