= Marga =

Marga may refer to:

== People ==
=== Given name ===
- Marga (Batak), a family name in Batak society
- Marga Barbu (1929–2009), Romanian actress
- Marga Boodts (1895–1976), woman claimed to be Grand Duchess Olga Nikolaevna of Russia
- Marga Gomez (born 1960), Puerto Rican/Cuban-American comedian, playwright, and humorist
- Marga Klompé (1912–1986), Dutch politician
- Marga López (1924–2005), Argentine-Mexican actress
- Marga Minco (1920–2023), Dutch journalist and writer
- Marga Ortigas, Manila-based correspondent for Al Jazeera English
- Marga Petersen (1919–2002), German athlete who competed mainly in the sprints
- Marga Richter (1926–2020), American composer
- Marga Scheide (born 1954), Dutch former model and a singer
- Marga Schiml (born 1945), German opera singer
- Marga T (1943–2023), Indonesian writer
- Marga van Praag (born 1946), Dutch journalist and television presenter

=== Fictional characters ===
- Margaret "Marga" M. Bartolome, a character from Philippine drama series Kadenang Ginto

== Places ==
- Marga, Estonia, a village in Estonia
- Marga (East Syrian diocese), a mediaeval diocese of the Church of the East
- Marga, Caraș-Severin (Hungarian: Márga), a commune in Caraș-Severin County, southwestern Romania
- Marga, Tabanan, a subdistrict (Kecamatan) of Tabanan Regency, Bali, Indonesia
- Marga Marga Province, one of the eight provinces in the central Chilean region of Valparaíso
- Marga (river), a tributary of the river Bistra in Caraș-Severin County, southwestern Romania
- Marga, a village in Godeanu Commune, Mehedinți County, western Romania
- Marga, now called Yemişli, Uludere in Turkey

== Religion ==
- Ananda Marga, socio-spiritual organization founded in Jamalpur, Bihar, India
- Marga (Sanskrit mārga; Pali magga, "path") in Buddhism refers to the path to enlightenment
- Marga in Hinduism refers to a way of accomplishing something such as yoga or sādhanā

== See also ==
- Marg (disambiguation)
- Margaretha
