= Valea Lupului River =

Valea Lupului River may refer to the following rivers in Romania:

- Valea Lupului, a tributary of the Argeș in Argeș County
- Valea Lupului, a tributary of the Bistra in Caraș-Severin County
- Valea Lupului, a tributary of the Bozani in Bihor County
- Valea Lupului, a tributary of the Cibin in Sibiu County
- Valea Lupului, a tributary of the Holbav in Brașov County
- Valea Lupului, a tributary of the Iad in Bihor County
- Valea Lupului, a tributary of the Negri in Caraș-Severin County
- Valea Lupului, a tributary of the Râușor in Argeș County
