= Bistra Mărului =

River in Romania

- Location within Romania

Location
- Country: Romania
- Counties: Caraș-Severin County
- Villages: Poiana Mărului, Măru

Physical characteristics
- Source: Țarcu Mountains
- Mouth: Bistra
  - location: Oțelu Roșu
  - coordinates: 45.5285°N 22.3743°E
- Length: 35 km (22 mi)
- Basin size: 293 km^{2} (113 sq mi)

Basin features
- Progression: Bistra→ Timiș→ Danube→ Black Sea

The Bistra Mărului is a left tributary of the river Bistra in Romania. It discharges into the Bistra in Oțelu Roșu. Its length is 35 km (22 mi) and its basin size is 293 km^{2} (113 sq mi).

== Tributaries ==
The following rivers are tributaries to the river Bistra Mărului:

- Left: Varing, Frâncu, Dalciu, Jdimir, Șucu, Scorila, Bratonia, Șasa, Pietroasa
- Right: Izvorul Alb, Peceneaga, Valea Rea, Valea Roșiei, Valea Mare, Sălătruc, Bolvașnița Mare
