= 2026 Bavarian local elections =

2026 election in Bavaria, Germany

- 8 March 2026

5,542 district council seats
- Turnout: 6,441,918 (63.44%) ▲4.77%
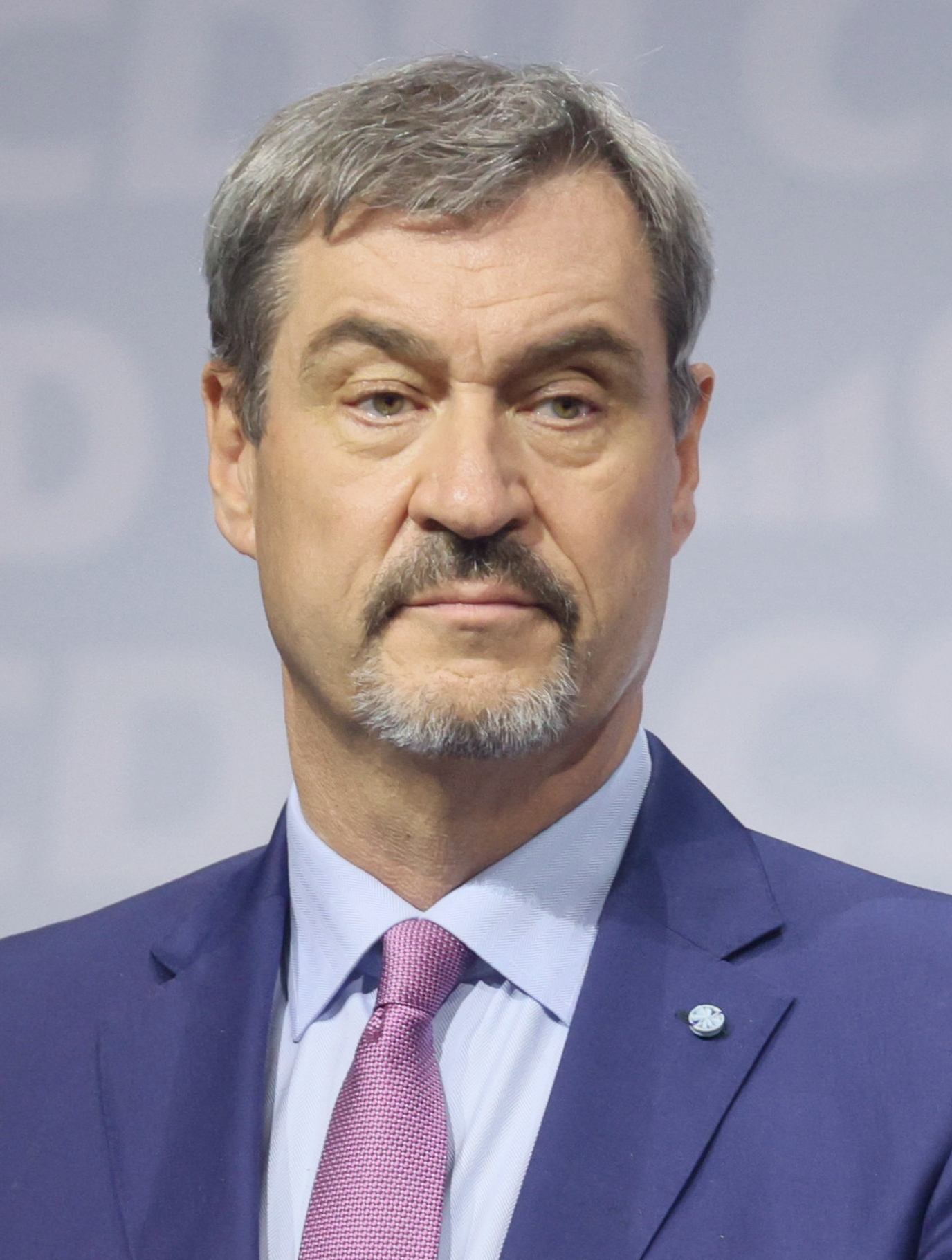

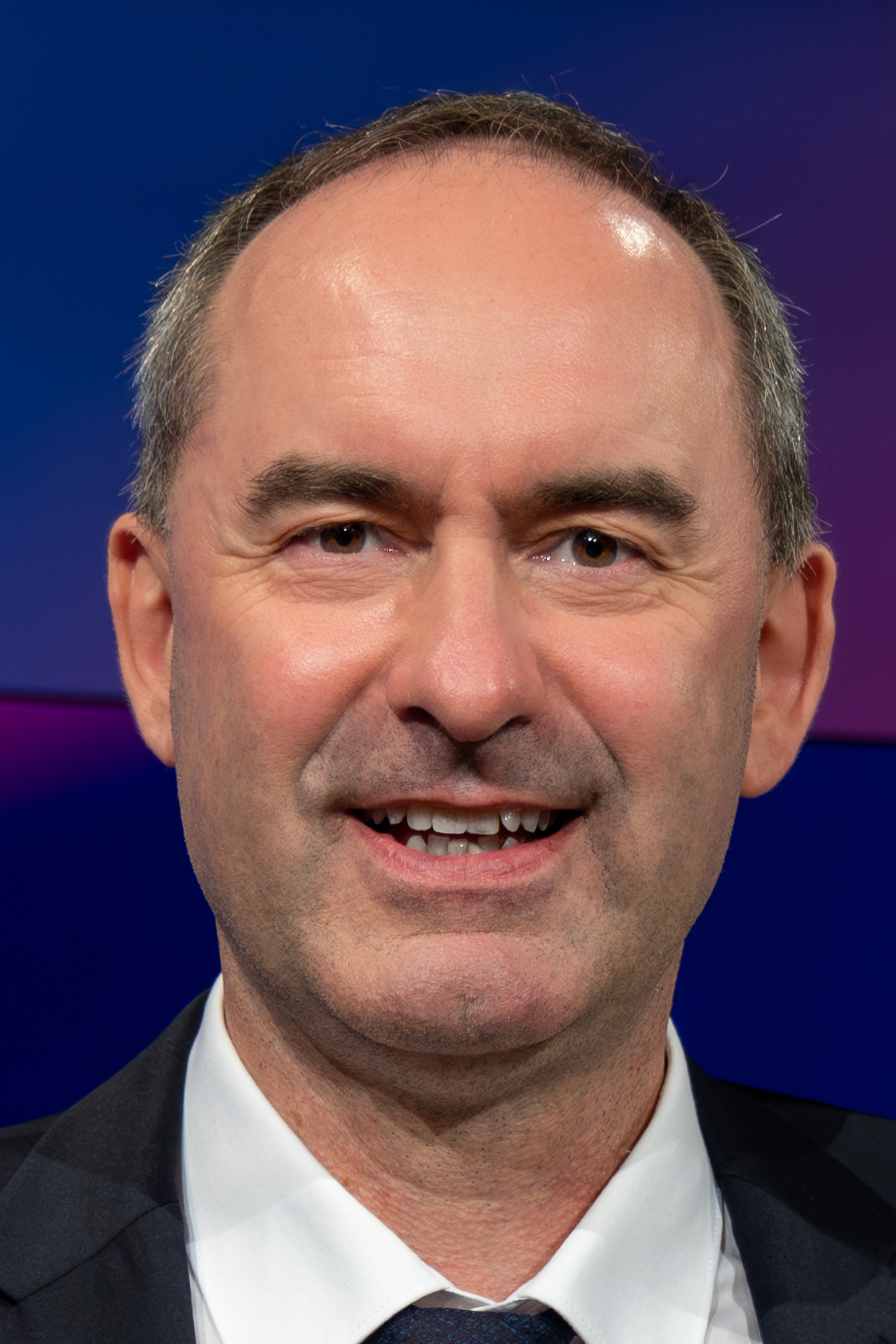

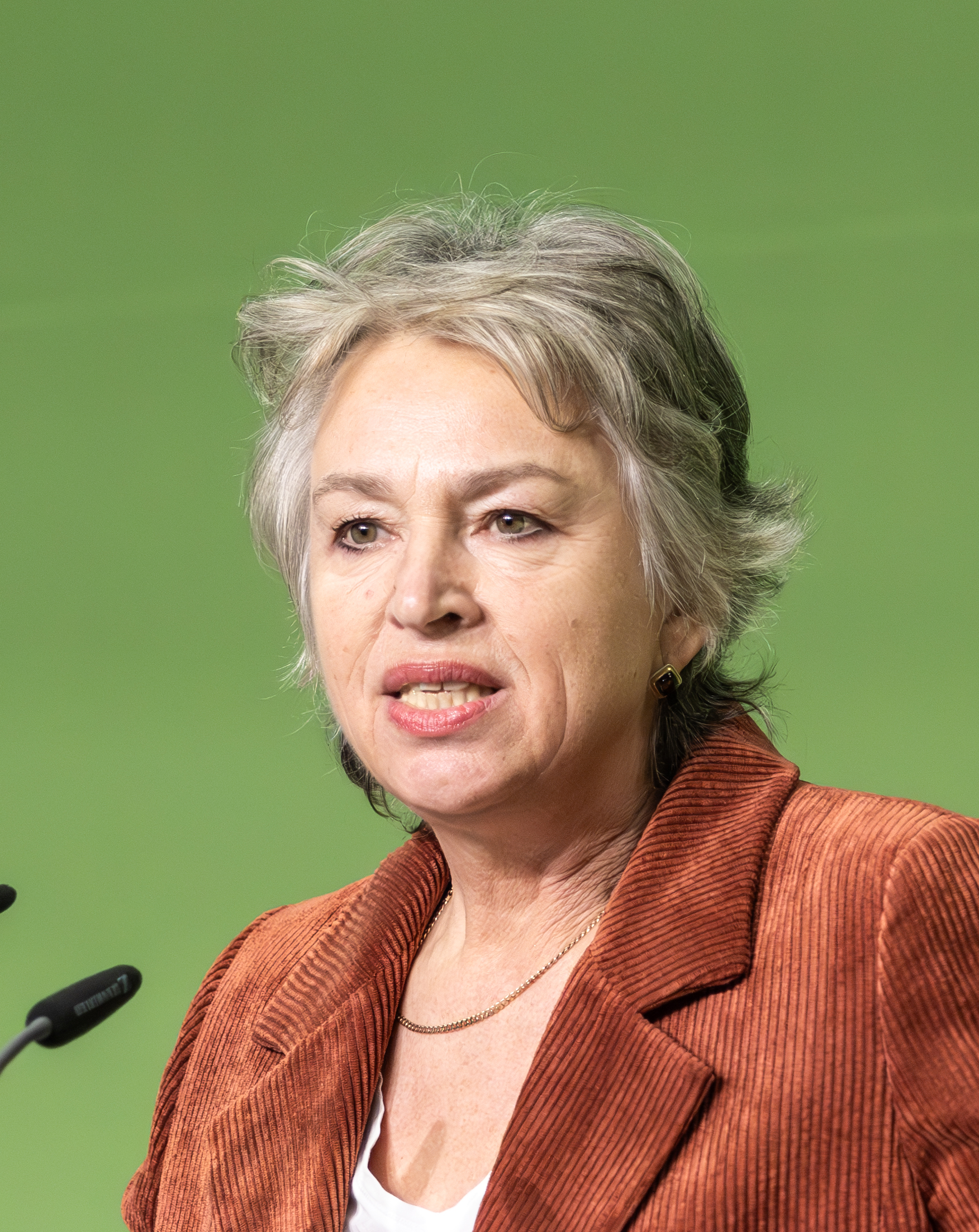

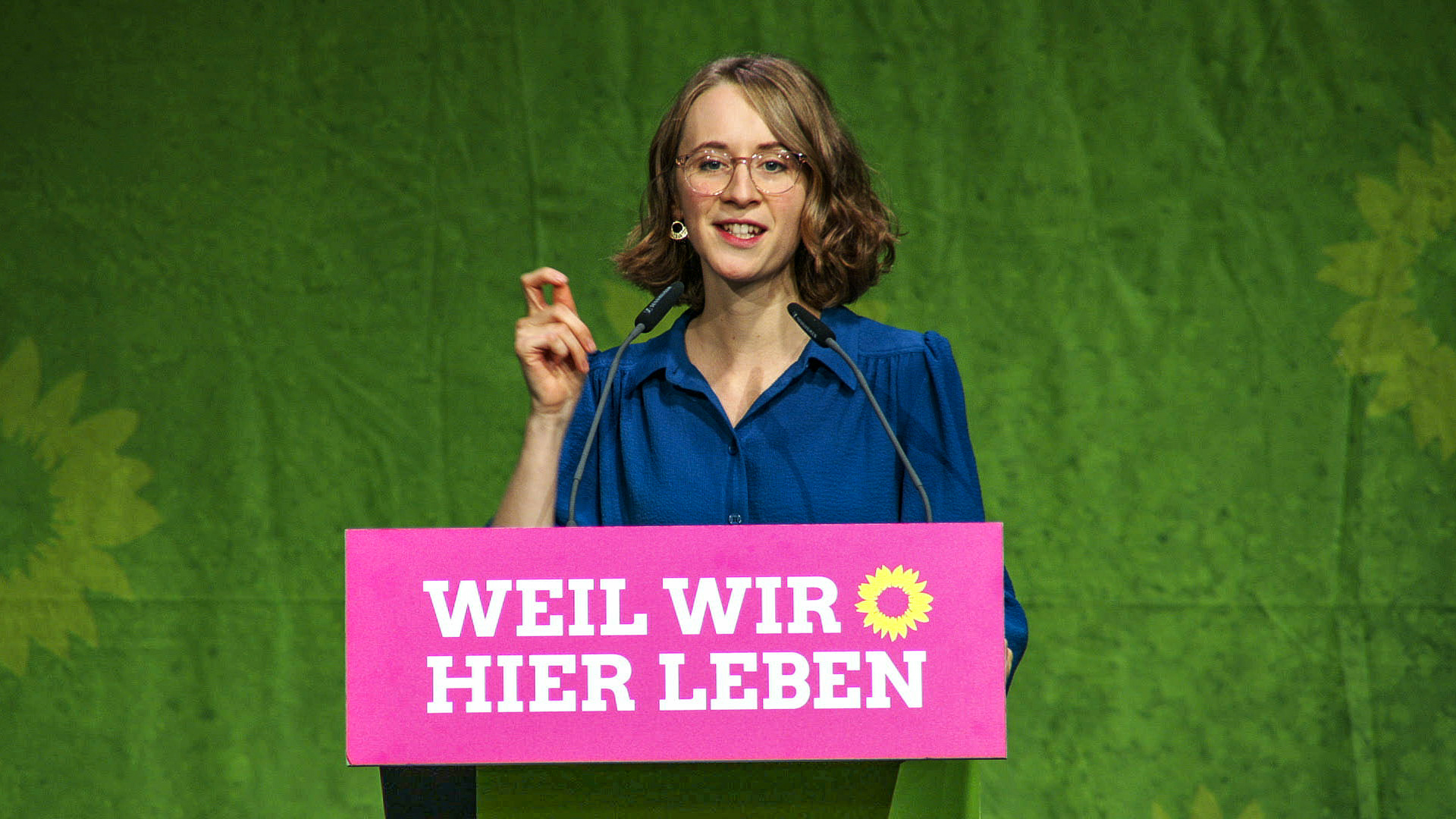

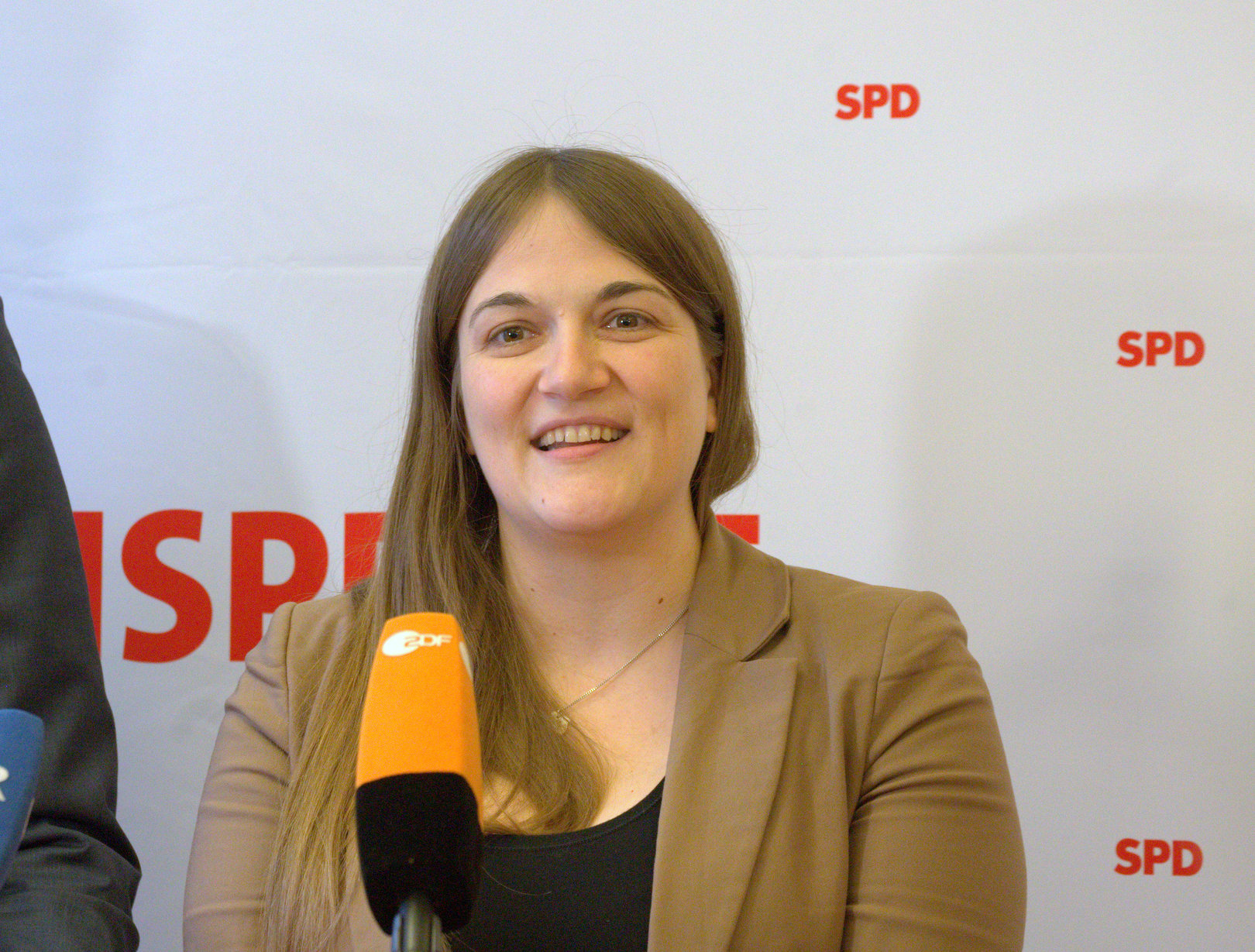

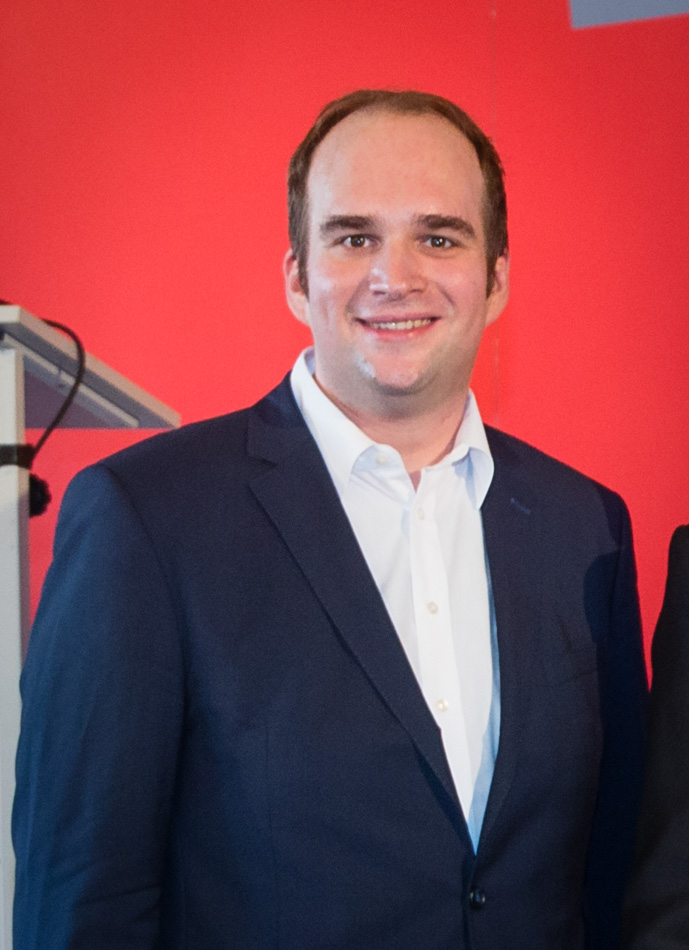

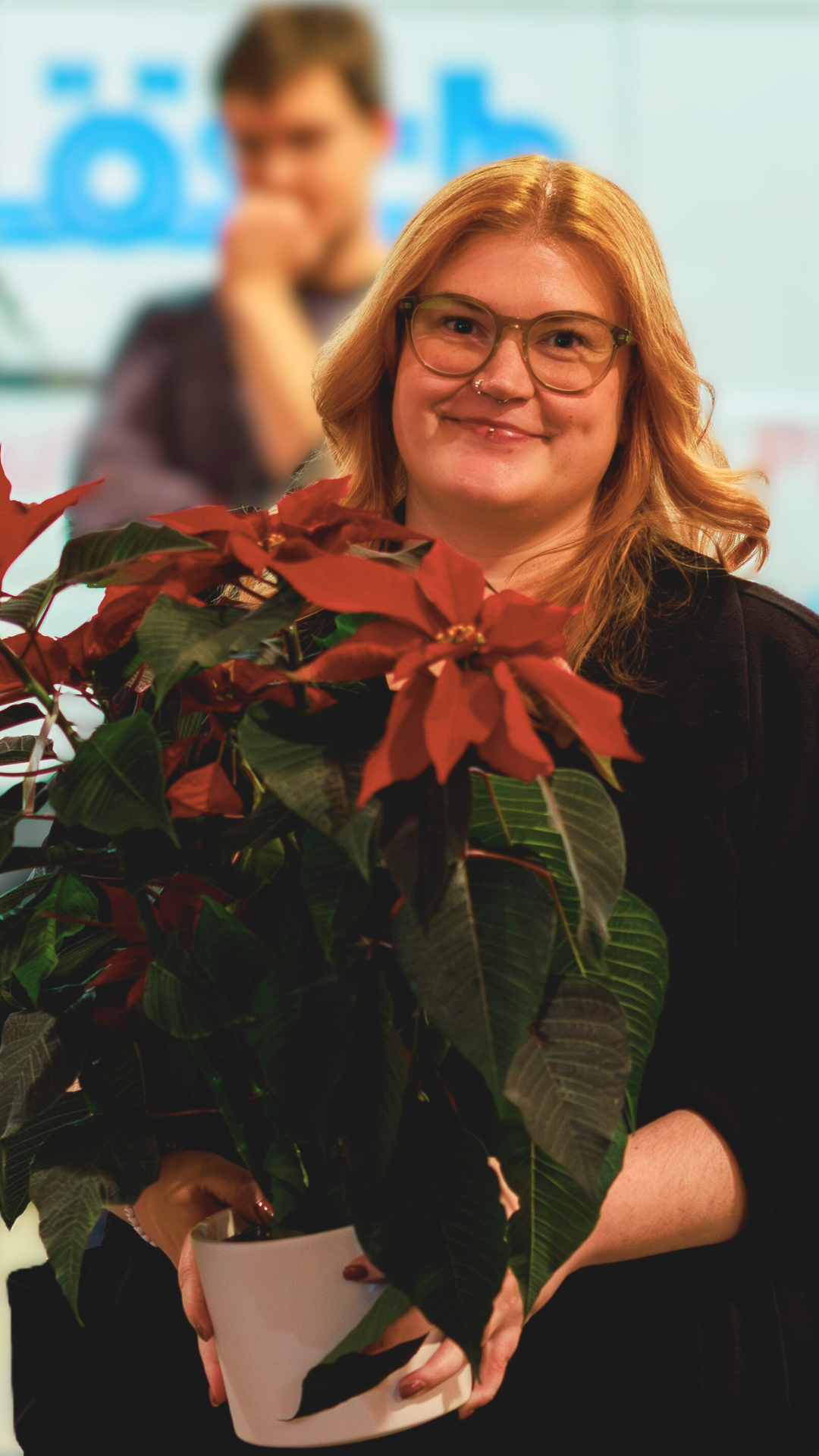

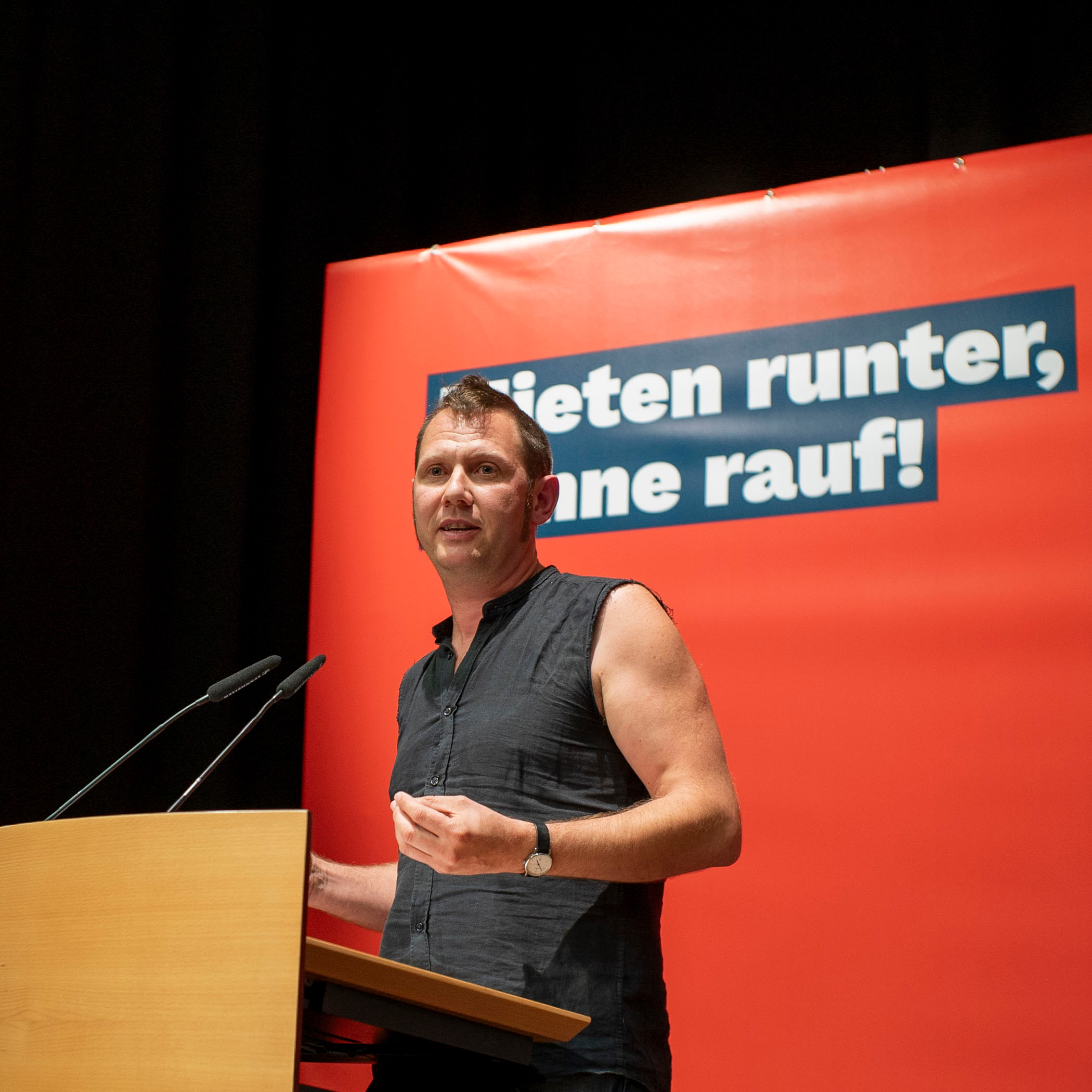

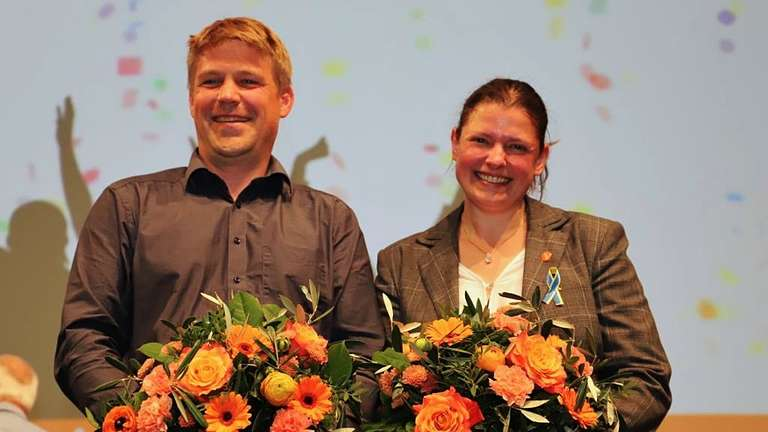
| | First party | Second party | Third party |
|---|---|---|---|
| Leader | Markus Söder | Stephan Protschka | Hubert Aiwanger |
| Party | CSU | AfD | FW |
| Last election | 1,938 seats, 34.47% | 262 seats, 4.75% | 694 seats, 11.90% |
| Seats won | 1,817 | 711 | 711 |
| Seat change | ▼121 | ▲449 | ▲17 |
| Popular vote | 2,030,112 | 763,040 | 755,086 |
| Percentage | 32.54% | 12.23% | 12.10% |
| Swing | ▼1.93% | ▲7.48% | ▲0.20% |
| | Fourth party | Fifth party | Sixth party |
| Leader | Gisela Sengl & Eva Lettenbauer | Ronja Endres & Sebastian Roloff | None |
| Party | Greens | SPD | Local voters' associations |
| Last election | 880 seats, 17.46% | 738 seats, 13.68% | 560 seats, 8.66% |
| Seats won | 666 | 665 | 520 |
| Seat change | ▼214 | ▼73 | ▼40 |
| Popular vote | 848,443 | 764,799 | 512,601 |
| Percentage | 13.60% | 12.26% | 8.22% |
| Swing | ▼3.86% | ▼1.42% | ▼0.44% |
| | Seventh party | Eighth party | Ninth party |
| Leader | Sarah Vollath & Martin Bauhof | Agnes Becker & Tobias Ruff | Michael Ruoff |
| Party | Linke | ÖDP | FDP |
| Last election | 77 seats, 1.66% | 187 seats, 3.42% | 161 seats, 2.94% |
| Seats won | 164 | 131 | 113 |
| Seat change | ▲87 | ▼56 | ▼48 |
| Popular vote | 213,484 | 145,438 | 129,778 |
| Percentage | 3.42% | 2.33% | 2.08% |
| Swing | ▲1.76% | ▼1.09% | ▼0.86% |

The 2026 Bavarian local elections were held on March 8, 2026 to elect members of Bavaria's 71 district councils and 25 independent city councils.

== Results ==
The historically dominant Christian Social Union (CSU) placed first, albeit with a reduction in seats and vote share. The Alternative for Germany (AfD) placed second with more than double the votes and seats they received in the 2020 election. The Greens experienced the largest decline of any party, losing over 200 seats.

A number of small parties also won seats. Volt won a number of seats, largely concentrated in urban areas including Munich, Nuremberg, and Bamberg. The Sahra Wagenknecht Alliance (BSW), participated for the first time since its founding in 2024, winning two seats; one in Coburg and one in Kaufbeuren. Small conservative parties The Republicans and the Bavaria Party both lost seats, and were mostly successful in rural regions.

Summary of results for the 2026 Bavarian local elections
| Party | Votes | % | +/– | Seats | +/– |
|---|---|---|---|---|---|
| Christian Social Union (CSU) | 2,030,112 | 32.54 | −1.93 | 1,817 | −121 |
| Alternative for Germany (AfD) | 763,040 | 12.23 | +7.48 | 711 | +449 |
| Free Voters (FW) | 755,086 | 12.10 | +0.20 | 711 | +17 |
| The Greens (Grüne) | 848,443 | 13.60 | −3.86 | 666 | −214 |
| Social Democratic Party (SPD) | 764,799 | 12.26 | −1.42 | 665 | −73 |
| Local voters' associations | 512,601 | 8.22 | −0.44 | 520 | −40 |
| Die Linke | 213,484 | 3.42 | +1.76 | 164 | +87 |
| Ecological Democratic Party (ÖDP) | 145,438 | 2.33 | −1.09 | 131 | −56 |
| Free Democratic Party (FDP) | 129,778 | 2.08 | −0.86 | 113 | −48 |
| Bavaria Party (BP) | 17,549 | 0.28 | −0.23 | 15 | −14 |
| Die PARTEI | 6,590 | 0.11 | −0.13 | 2 | −4 |
| Other parties (Note: Including Volt, Sahra Wagenknecht Alliance, Pirate Party and The Republicans) | 52,637 | 0.84 | +0.52 | 27 | +17 |
| Total | 6,239,557 | 100.00 | – | 5,542 | – |
| Valid votes | 6,239,557 | 96.86 | | | |
| Invalid/blank votes | 202,361 | 3.14 | | | |
| Total votes | 6,441,918 | 100.00 | | | |
| Registered voters/turnout | 10,153,961 | 63.44 | | | |

=== Mayoral results ===
Lord Mayors were also elected in the 25 county-free (kreisfreie) cities. If no candidate received over 50% of the vote, a run-off election between the two leading candidates took place on March 22. Below are the results for the four largest cities in Bavaria.

==== Munich ====
2026 Munich mayoral election
| Candidate | Party | First round | | Second round | |
| Candidate | Party | Votes | % | Votes | % |
|---|---|---|---|---|---|
| Dominik Krause | Greens | 168,010 | 29.46 | 272,533 | 56.35 |
| Dieter Reiter | SPD | 203,113 | 35.62 | 211,075 | 43.65 |
| Clemens Baumgärtner | CSU | 121,713 | 21.34 | | |
| Markus Walbrunn | AfD | 25,046 | 4.39 | | |
| Stefan Jagel | Die Linke | 13,770 | 2.41 | | |
| Michael Piazolo | FW | 10,624 | 1.86 | | |
| Tobias Ruff | ÖDP | 7,882 | 1.38 | | |
| Jörg Hoffmann | FDP | 6,983 | 1.22 | | |
| Felix Sproll | Volt | 6,117 | 1.07 | | |
| Christiane Pfau | Culture Alliance | 2,002 | 0.35 | | |
| Philipp Drabinski | Die PARTEI | 1,980 | 0.35 | | |
| Dirk Höpner | Munich List | 1,703 | 0.30 | | |
| Richard Progl | BP | 1,285 | 0.23 | | |
| Total | | 570,228 | 100.00 | 483,608 | 100.00 |
| Valid votes | | 570,228 | 99.57 | 483,608 | 99.46 |
| Invalid/blank votes | | 2,472 | 0.43 | 2,615 | 0.54 |
| Total votes | | 572,700 | 100.00 | 486,223 | 100.00 |
| Registered voters/turnout | | 1,094,793 | 52.31 | 1,092,531 | 44.50 |
Source: Bavarian State Office for Statistics and Data

==== Nuremberg ====
2026 Nuremberg mayoral election
| Candidate | Party | First round | | Second round | |
| Candidate | Party | Votes | % | Votes | % |
|---|---|---|---|---|---|
| Marcus König | CSU | 88,889 | 45.99 | 85,751 | 55.48 |
| Nasser Ahmed | SPD | 51,198 | 26.49 | 68,822 | 44.52 |
| Britta Walthelm | Greens | 20,065 | 10.38 | | |
| Roland-Alexander Hübscher | AfD | 17,551 | 9.08 | | |
| Titus Schüller | Die Linke | 7,083 | 3.66 | | |
| Thomas Estrada | FW | 4,849 | 2.51 | | |
| Marion Padua | Left List Nuremberg | 1,501 | 0.78 | | |
| Jan Gehrke | ÖDP | 1,197 | 0.62 | | |
| Christiane Schleindl | Die Guten | 938 | 0.49 | | |
| Total | | 193,271 | 100.00 | 154,573 | 100.00 |
| Valid votes | | 193,271 | 99.45 | 154,573 | 99.52 |
| Invalid/blank votes | | 1,068 | 0.55 | 750 | 0.48 |
| Total votes | | 194,339 | 100.00 | 155,323 | 100.00 |
| Registered voters/turnout | | 379,322 | 51.23 | 378,289 | 41.06 |
Source: Bavarian State Office for Statistics and Data

==== Augsburg ====
2026 Augsburg mayoral election
| Candidate | Party | First round | | Second round | |
| Candidate | Party | Votes | % | Votes | % |
|---|---|---|---|---|---|
| Florian Freund | SPD | 21,834 | 19.93 | 44,077 | 56.58 |
| Eva Weber | CSU | 37,212 | 33.96 | 33,823 | 43.42 |
| Martina Wild | Greens | 17,937 | 16.37 | | |
| Andreas Jurca | AfD | 13,639 | 12.45 | | |
| Hannes Aigner | FW | 7,197 | 6.57 | | |
| Elisabeth Wiesholler | Die Linke | 5,521 | 5.04 | | |
| Bruno Marcon | Augsburg in Bürgerhand | 2,112 | 1.93 | | |
| Lisa McQueen | Die PARTEI | 1,876 | 1.71 | | |
| Iris Steiner | FDP/Pro Augsburg e.V. | 1,622 | 1.48 | | |
| Roland Wegner | V-Partei3 | 619 | 0.56 | | |
| Total | | 109,569 | 100.00 | 77,900 | 100.00 |
| Valid votes | | 109,569 | 99.47 | 77,900 | 99.34 |
| Invalid/blank votes | | 587 | 0.53 | 520 | 0.66 |
| Total votes | | 110,156 | 100.00 | 78,420 | 100.00 |
| Registered voters/turnout | | 212,515 | 51.83 | 212,027 | 36.99 |
Source: Bavarian State Office for Statistics and Data

==== Regensburg ====
2026 Regensburg mayoral election
| Candidate | Party | First round | | Second round | |
| Candidate | Party | Votes | % | Votes | % |
|---|---|---|---|---|---|
| Thomas Burger | SPD | 12,774 | 19.10 | 28,629 | 53.25 |
| Astrid Freudenstein | CSU | 25,068 | 37.48 | 25,138 | 46.75 |
| Helene Sigloch | Greens | 12,637 | 18.90 | | |
| Thomas Thurow | Bridge | 4,300 | 6.43 | | |
| Michael Schien | FW | 3,551 | 5.31 | | |
| Sebastian Wanner | Die Linke | 2,560 | 3.83 | | |
| Benedikt Suttner | ÖDP | 1,691 | 2.53 | | |
| Horst Meierhofer | FDP | 1,232 | 1.84 | | |
| Lisa Brenner | Volt | 1,187 | 1.77 | | |
| Christian Janele | Christian Social Citizens in Regensburg | 794 | 1.19 | | |
| Ingo Frank | Die PARTEI | 545 | 0.81 | | |
| Jakob Friedl | Ribisl Party | 536 | 0.80 | | |
| Total | | 66,875 | 100.00 | 53,767 | 100.00 |
| Valid votes | | 66,875 | 98.94 | 53,767 | 99.65 |
| Invalid/blank votes | | 717 | 1.06 | 189 | 0.35 |
| Total votes | | 67,592 | 100.00 | 53,956 | 100.00 |
| Registered voters/turnout | | 117,094 | 57.72 | 116,778 | 46.20 |
Source: Bavarian State Office for Statistics and Data
