= Marga (river) =

- Location within Romania

Location
- Country: Romania
- Counties: Caraș-Severin County

Physical characteristics
- Source: Țarcu Mountains
- Mouth: Bistra
  - location: Marga
  - coordinates: 45.5243°N 22.5148°E
- Length: 11 km (6.8 mi)
- Basin size: 41 km^{2} (16 sq mi)

Basin features
- Progression: Bistra→ Timiș→ Danube→ Black Sea
- Tributaries
  - left: Nermeș

The Marga is a left tributary of the river Bistra in Romania. It discharges into the Bistra in Vama Marga. Its length is 11 km (6.8 mi) and its basin size is 41 km^{2} (16 sq mi).
