= Alexandru Caia =

Romanian association football player

Personal information
- Full name: Alexandru Simi Caia
- Date of birth: 10 April 2003 (age 23)
- Place of birth: Oțelu Roșu, Romania
- Height: 1.78 m (5 ft 10 in)
- Position: Forward

Team information
- Current team: Bistra Glimboca
- Number: 9

Youth career
- –2020: Botoșani

Senior career*
Years	Team	Apps	(Gls)
2020–2022	Botoșani	12	(0)
2022–2023	Voința Lupac	24	(4)
2023–	Bistra Glimboca		
- * Club domestic league appearances and goals as of 14:27, 15 January 2024 (UTC)

Alexandru Simi Caia (born 10 April 2003) is a Romanian professional footballer who plays as a forward for Bistra Glimboca.

== Career statistics ==
=== Club ===
As of 4 May 2021

Club	Season	League			Cup		Continental		Other		Total	
Club	Season	Division	Apps	Goals	Apps	Goals	Apps	Goals	Apps	Goals	Apps	Goals
Botoșani	2019–20	Liga I	1	0	0	0	0	0	0	0	1	0
Botoșani	2020–21	Liga I	9	0	0	0	0	0	0	0	9	0
Career total			10	0	0	0	0	0	0	0	10	0
