= Crâsnic =

Crâsnic is a Romanian surname. Notable people with the surname include:

- Aurel Crâsnic (1926–1968), Romanian footballer
- Ioan Crâsnic (1929–2026), Romanian Greco-Roman wrestler and wrestling coach
