= Rusca (Bistra) =

River in Romania

- Location within Romania

Location
- Country: Romania
- Counties: Caraș-Severin County
- Villages: Rușchița, Rusca Montană

Physical characteristics
- Source: Poiana Ruscă Mountains
- Mouth: Bistra
  - location: Voislova
  - coordinates: 45.5314°N 22.4609°E
- Length: 21 km (13 mi)
- Basin size: 166 km^{2} (64 sq mi)

Basin features
- Progression: Bistra→ Timiș→ Danube→ Black Sea
- Tributaries
  - left: Miclăuș, Ciotorog, Loznișoara, Valea Mărului
  - right: Lozna

The Rusca is a right tributary of the river Bistra in Romania. It discharges into the Bistra in Voislova. Its length is 21 km (13 mi) and its basin size is 166 km^{2} (64 sq mi).
