= Glâmboca =

Glâmboca Glimboca
- Location within Romania

Location
- Country: Romania
- Counties: Caraș-Severin County

Physical characteristics
- Source: Poiana Ruscă Mountains
- Mouth: Bistra
  - location: Glimboca
  - coordinates: 45.5018°N 22.3239°E
- Length: 12 km (7.5 mi)

Basin features
- Progression: Bistra→ Timiș→ Danube→ Black Sea

The Glâmboca (also: Glimboca) is a right tributary of the river Bistra in Romania. It flows into the Bistra in the village Glimboca. Its length is 12 km (7.5 mi) and its basin size is 13 km^{2} (5.0 sq mi).
