= Preluci =

Preluci may refer to several places in Romania:

- Preluci, a village in Agăș Commune, Bacău County
- Preluci, a village in Lozna Commune, Sălaj County
