= Vârciorova =

River in Romania

- Location within Romania

Location
- Country: Romania
- Counties: Caraș-Severin County

Physical characteristics
- Source: Poiana Ruscă Mountains
- Mouth: Bistra
  - location: Obreja
  - coordinates: 45.4916°N 22.2743°E
- Length: 13 km (8.1 mi)
- Basin size: 27 km^{2} (10 sq mi)

Basin features
- Progression: Bistra→ Timiș→ Danube→ Black Sea

The Vârciorova is a right tributary of the river Bistra in Romania. It discharges into the Bistra in Obreja. Its length is 13 km (8.1 mi) and its basin size is 27 km^{2} (10 sq mi).
