= Rușchița marble =

Rușchița marble (Croatian: Ruščica; Serbian: Рушчица; Hungarian: Ruskica márvány; German: Ruschitza-Marmor) is a mainly reddish, pinkish or white calcitic marble found in Romania. The marble deposit is located in the north of Caraș-Severin County, about 10 km (6 mi) northwest of the village of Rusita near Rusca Montană, in the Poiana Rusca Mountains.

Rușchița marble mining was done in the shape of a turned-over bell between 1884 and 1960. The quarry originally belonged to the royal Hungarian Ärar. He leased it to Johannes Bibel from Oravița in the 19th century. Nowadays the extraction is made in descending horizontal stopes.

== Gallery ==
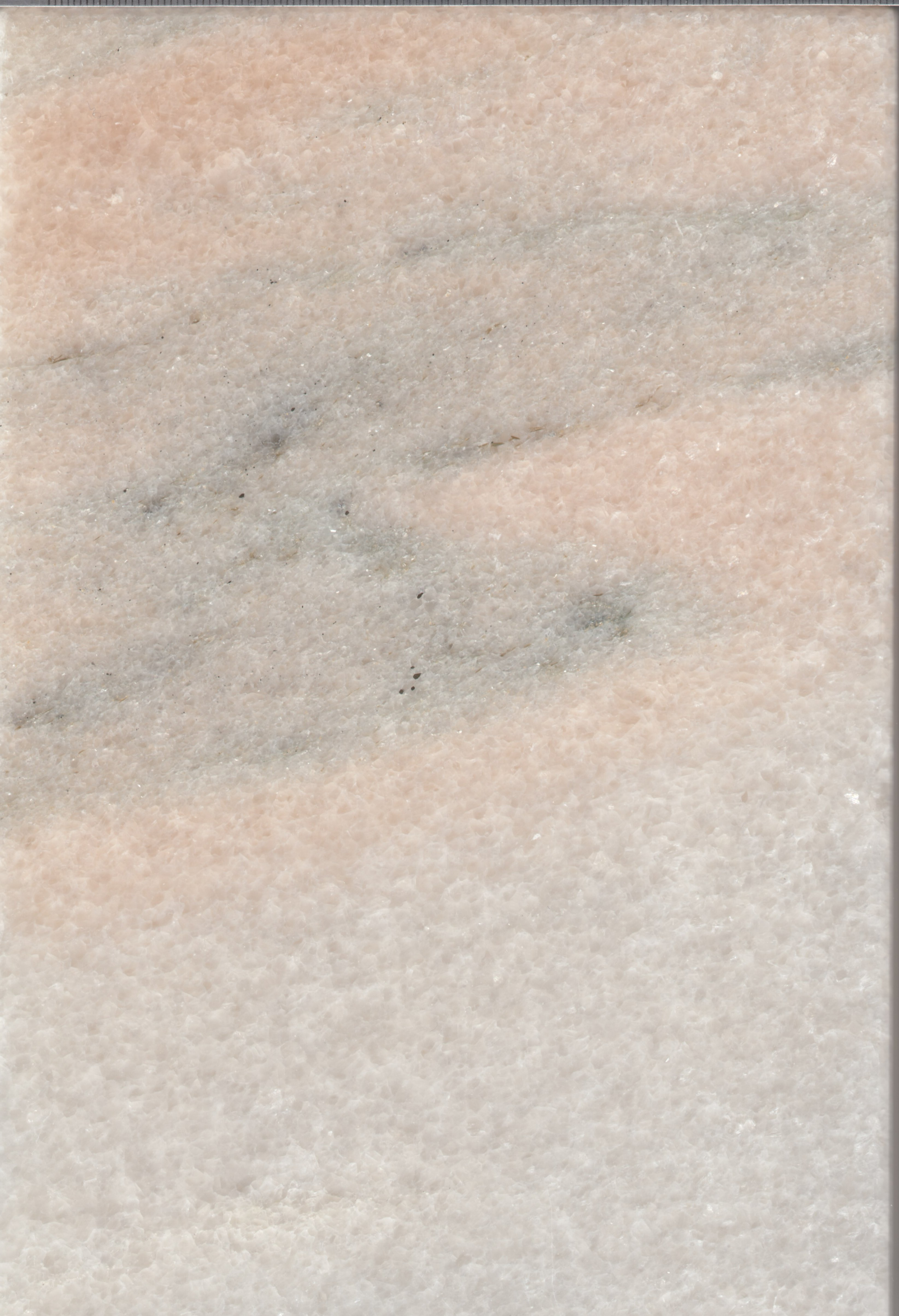
Rușchița marble Champagne

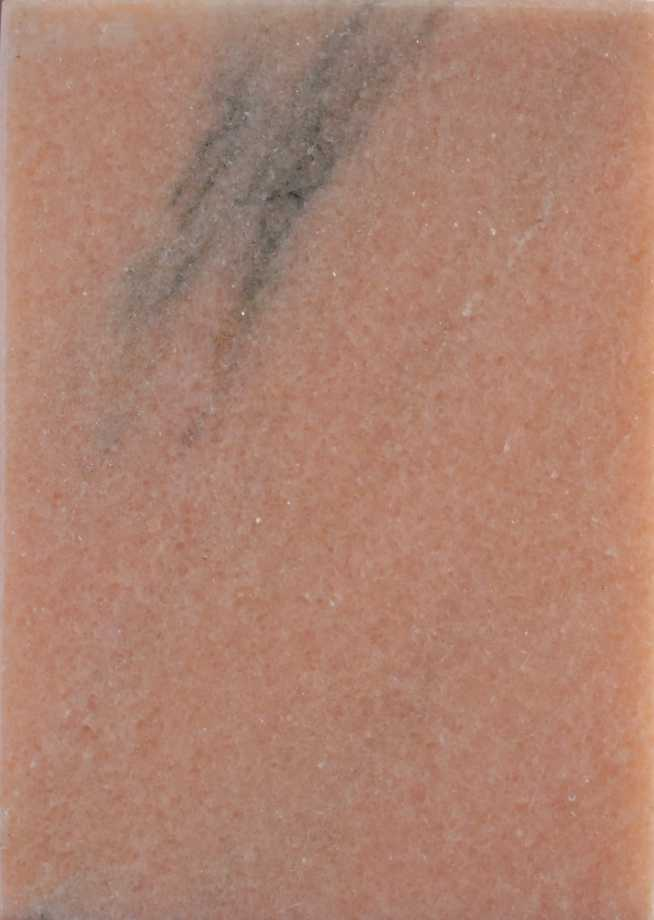
Rușchița marble Rosé

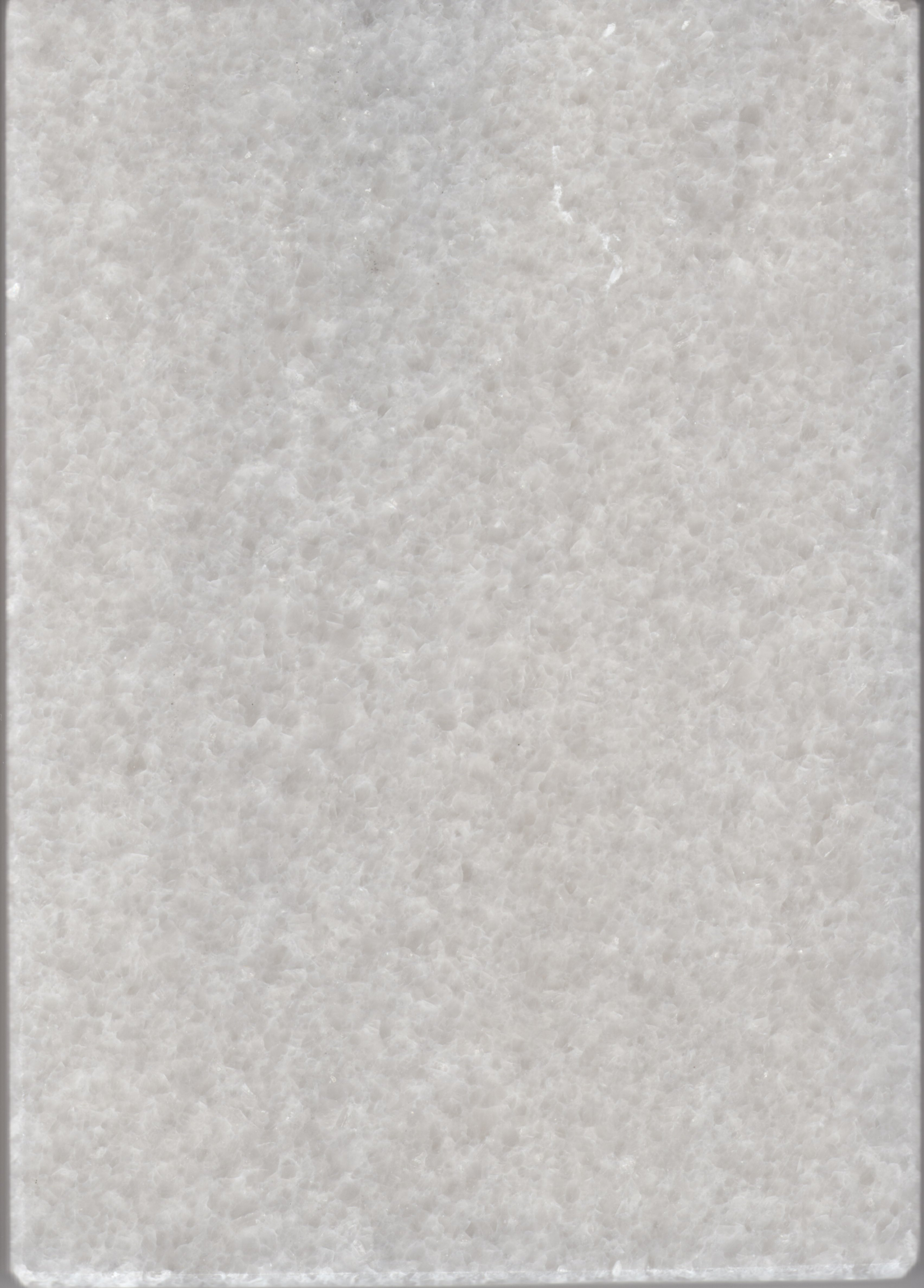
Rușchița marble White
