= Dieter Reiter =

German politician (born 1958)

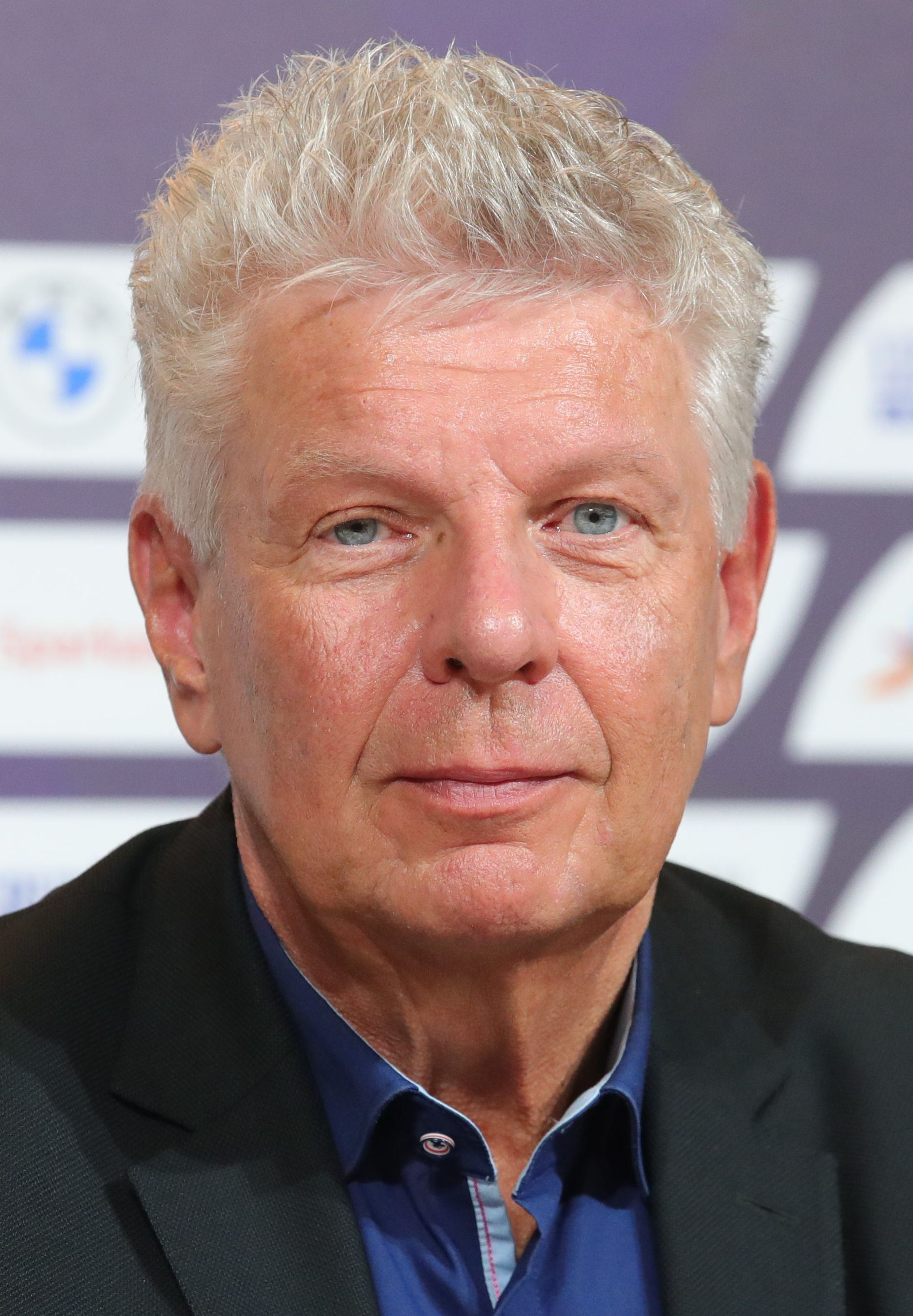
- Reiter in 2022

Mayor of Munich
- In office 1 May 2014 – 30 April 2026
- Preceded by: Christian Ude
- Succeeded by: Dominik Krause

Personal details
- Born: 19 May 1958 (age 68) Rain, Swabia, Bavaria, West Germany
- Party: Social Democratic Party
- Spouse: Petra Reiter (2003–present)
- Children: 1

Dieter Reiter (born 19 May 1958) is a German politician who served as the mayor of Munich from 2014 until 2026. He is a member of the Social Democratic Party (SPD).

== Career ==
Reiter was born in Rain, Swabia, a small town in Bavaria. He studied at the Fachhochschule für öffentliche Verwaltung und Rechtspflege in Hof, where he finished 1981. On 30 March 2014, he was elected mayor of Munich with 56.7% of the votes. He succeeded Christian Ude, who served as mayor from 1993 to 2014. Reiter was SPD delegate to the Federal Convention for the purpose of electing the President of Germany in 2017.

In 2021, Reiter proposed illuminating the stadium for UEFA Euro 2020 in rainbow colors to protest the Hungarian anti-LGBT law, but this was rejected by UEFA.

On March 22, 2026, Reiter lost the mayoral elections in Munich against Dominik Krause.

== Other activities ==
=== Corporate boards ===
- FC Bayern, member of the advisory board
- Stadtwerke München (SWM), ex officio chairman of the supervisory board
- Munich Airport, ex officio member of the supervisory board
- Messe München, ex officio member of the supervisory board

=== Non-profit organizations ===
- LMU Munich, member of the board of trustees
- Technical University of Munich (TUM), member of the board of trustees
- Deutsches Museum, member of the board of trustees
- Ifo Institute for Economic Research, member of the board of trustees
- ver.di, member

== Personal life ==
Reiter has been married twice and is the father of a son from his first marriage. His second wife, Petra, has two children of her own from a previous relationship.

Political offices
Preceded by Christian Ude	Mayor of Munich; 2014–2026	Succeeded by Dominik Krause
