= Bistra (Timiș) =

River in Romania

- Location within Romania

Location
- Country: Romania
- Counties: Caraș-Severin
- Towns: Oțelu Roșu

Physical characteristics
- Source: Lake Bistra
  - location: Țarcu Mountains
- Mouth: Timiș
  - location: Downstream of Caransebeș
  - coordinates: 45.4799°N 22.1847°E
- Length: 60 km (37 mi)
- Basin size: 919 km^{2} (355 sq mi)

Basin features
- Progression: Timiș→ Danube→ Black Sea
- Tributaries
  - left: Marga, Bistra Mărului
  - right: Rusca, Vârciorova

The Bistra is a river in south-western Romania, in the Banat. It is a right tributary of the river Timiș. Its valley delimits the Țarcu Mountains to the south from the Poiana Ruscă mountains to the north. Its name is derived from a Slavic word meaning "fast-flowing".

The Bistra has its source in the Bistra Lake, located in the Țarcu Mountains, near Vârful Pietrei (2192 metres). It flows as a rapid river from south to north until it reaches the village of Bucova, where it changes direction and turns west. Its first major tributary is the Marga River; further down it collects the waters of the river Rusca. Before entering Oțelu Roșu, Bistra collects its greatest influx of waters, the Bistra Mărului. Near Ciuta, north of the town of Caransebeș, it flows into the Timiș. Its length is 60 km (37 mi) and its basin size is 919 km^{2} (355 sq mi).

The Bistra flows through the villages Bucova, Băuțar, Voislova, Valea Bistrei, Zăvoi, Cireșa, Oțelu Roșu, Glimboca, Obreja and Ciuta.

== Tributaries ==
The following rivers are tributaries to the river Bistra:

- Left: Pârâul Lupului, Bucovița, Marga, Bistra Mărului, Axin
- Right: Corni, Rusca, Valea Jghiabului, Valea Rugului, Ohaba, Glâmboca, Radina, Vârciorova
