= Marg =

Marg or MARG may refer to:

== People ==
- Elwin Marg (1918–2010), American optometrist and neuroscientist
- Harald Marg (born 1954), German canoer
- Marg Downey (born 1961), Australian comedian
- Marg Helgenberger, American actress
- Marg Moll (1884–1977), German sculptor, painter and author born Margarethe Haeffner
- Marg Osburne (1927–1977), Canadian country, folk and gospel singer
- Marg Ralston, Australian sports journalist, editor, and government advisor

== Other uses ==
- Shortening of margarita (the tequila-based sour cocktail)
- El Marg, a district of Cairo, Egypt
- MARG Limited, an Indian construction company
- Marg (magazine), an Indian art magazine
- MARG (technology), sensors providing attitude information for aircraft

== See also ==
- Marga (disambiguation)
