= Lozna (Rusca) =

- Location within Romania

Location
- Country: Romania
- Counties: Caraș-Severin County

Physical characteristics
- Source: Confluence of headwaters Lozna Mare and Lozna Mică
  - location: Poiana Ruscă Mountains
- Mouth: Rusca
  - location: Rusca Montană
  - coordinates: 45.5772°N 22.4490°E
- Length: 16 km (9.9 mi)
- Basin size: 63 km^{2} (24 sq mi)

Basin features
- Progression: Rusca→ Bistra→ Timiș→ Danube→ Black Sea
- Tributaries
  - left: Lozna Mică, Valea Cireșului, Negri, Varnița, Valea Cucii
  - right: Lozna Mare, Glăvan, Valea Alunului

The Lozna is a right tributary of the river Rusca in Romania. It starts at the confluence of headwaters Lozna Mare and Lozna Mică in the Poiana Ruscă Mountains. It flows into the Rusca in Rusca Montană. Its length is 16 km (9.9 mi) and its basin size is 63 km^{2} (24 sq mi).
