= Ioan Crâsnic =

Romanian Greco-Roman wrestler (1929–2026)

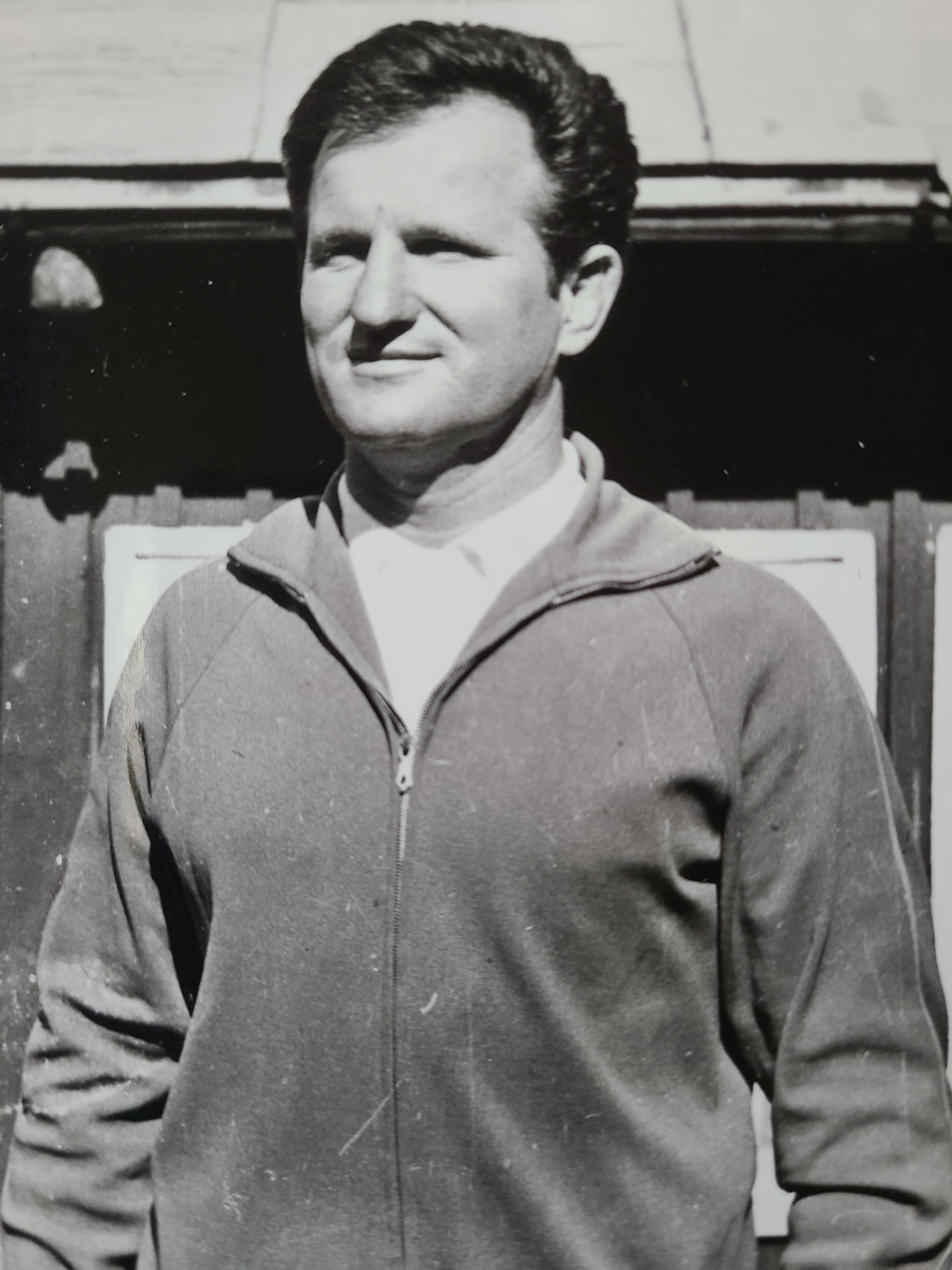

Personal information
- Nationality: Romania
- Born: 10 November 1929 Glimboca, Romania
- Died: 16 January 2026 (aged 96) Bucharest, Romania
- Occupation: Wrestling coach

Sport
- Sport: Wrestling
- Event: Greco-Roman

Ioan Crâsnic (10 November 1929 – 16 January 2026) was a Romanian Greco-Roman wrestler and wrestling coach. He served as coach of the Romanian Greco-Roman wrestling team at the Summer Olympics from 1960 to 1984 and in 1992.

Crâsnic died in Bucharest on 16 January 2026, at the age of 96.
