= Luca Novac =

Romanian musician (1941–2021)

- Born: 15 September 1941; Var, Kingdom of Romania
- Died: 15 February 2021 (aged 79); Timișoara, Romania
- Occupation: Musician

Luca Novac (15 September 1941 – 15 February 2021) was a Romanian musician.

== Biography ==
Novac was born into a family of musicians in the village of Var in Severin County in the Kingdom of Romania. He played multiple instruments, such as the clarinet, bagpipe, saxophone, and ocarina, but his favorite was the tárogató. He joined the Orchestrei Populare de Stat ”Lazăr Cernescu”, which was located in Caransebeș, in 1964. There, he made his first recordings on radio and television.

After his time in Caransebeș, he moved to Timișoara to join the Ansamblul Profesionist „Banatul” . From there, he would perform Romanian music abroad in China, South Korea, Mongolia, and the Soviet Union. He also performed with the band Radu Simion and recorded songs such as Doina oilor, Doiul lui Luca Novac, Doiul gugulanilor, and Hora de la Oravița.

Luca Novac died in Timișoara on 15 February 2021 at the age of 79.

== Discography ==
=== Mini-Discs ===
- Luca Novac și Petrică Vasile (1966, 1967)

=== Albums ===
- Trésors folkloriques roumains: un virtuose du taragote (1977)
- În memoria lui Luță Ioviță (1983)
- Luca Novac și Carmen Luca - Vai de cel care iubește (1994)

=== Audio Cassettes ===
- Luca Novac și Carmen Luca - Vai de cel care iubește (1994)
- Luca și Gheza Novac - Doine și jocuri bănățene (1990s)

=== CDs ===
- Trésors folkloriques roumains: un virtuose du taragote (1997)
- Luca Novac și Carmen Luca

== Distinctions ==
- Knight of the National Order of Merit (2004)
