= Dominik Krause =

Munich politician (born 1990)

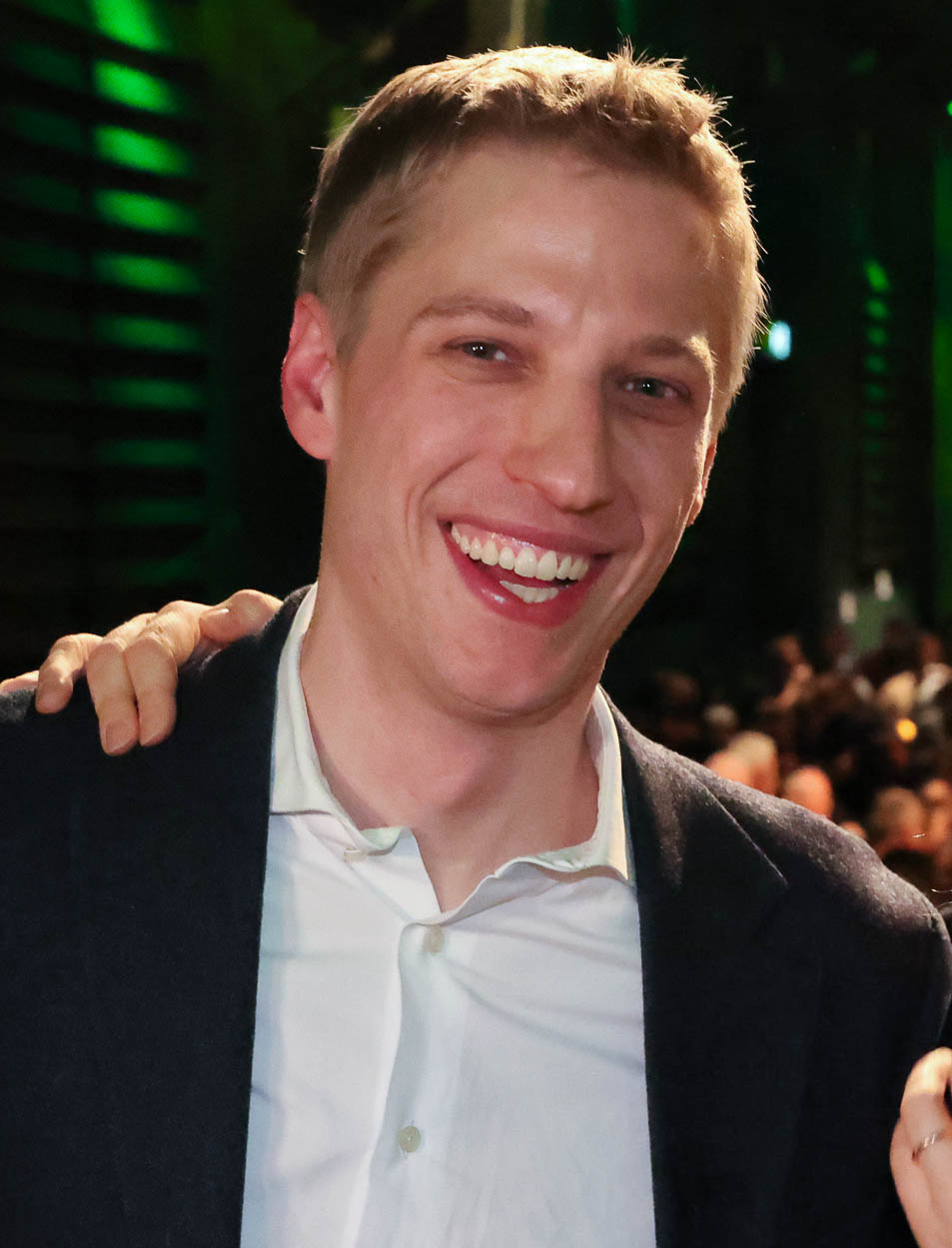
- Krause in 2026

Mayor of Munich
- Incumbent
- Assumed office 1 May 2026
- Preceded by: Dieter Reiter

Second Mayor of Munich
- In office 26 October 2023 – 30 April 2026
- Mayor: Dieter Reiter
- Preceded by: Katrin Habenschaden
- Succeeded by: Mona Fuchs

Personal details
- Born: 3 August 1990 (age 36) Munich, Bavaria, West Germany
- Party: Alliance 90/The Greens

Dominik Krause (born 3 August 1990 in Munich) is a German politician of the Alliance 90/The Greens party. He has served as mayor of Munich since May 2026, having previously served as Second Mayor of Munich from October 2023 until April 2026.

In the 2026 Munich mayoral election, Krause won the runoff election against the incumbent mayor Dieter Reiter. He took office on 1 May 2026.

== Life ==
Krause grew up in the Munich district of Obermenzing. After graduating from the Städtisches Louise-Schroeder-Gymnasium in 2009, he did his Zivildienst at a Montessori school in Großhadern. He then studied applied and engineering physics at the Technical University of Munich, graduating with a Master of Science.

In 2024 he became engaged to his long-time partner, physician Sebastian Müller. According to Krause, the couple met as teenagers at a dance class. They live in the Munich neighborhood of Obergiesing-Fasangarten.

== Political career ==
From 2012 to 2014, Krause served as spokesperson of Green Youth in Munich. In 2014 he was elected to the City Council and served as parliamentary group leader from 2022 to 2023. In 2019 and 2020 he also chaired the Greens in Munich. Since October 2023 he has served as Second Mayor.

Krause has been a member of München ist bunt! e.V. since 2012, where he advocates against racism. Since 2016 he has served on the organization's board.

Krause was a member of the advisory board of the Eine-Welt-Haus; he resigned at the end of 2017 in protest against the membership assembly's decision to make rooms available for an event connected to the anti-Israeli BDS campaign. Krause is also a member of the German-Israeli Society and is known for his close ties to Israel.

Shortly after taking office, he attracted national attention with his remark that the Oktoberfest was the "world's largest open drug scene". In the Instagram interview where he made the remark, he was not advocating drug use at the Oktoberfest, but rather calling for a more relaxed approach to cannabis following its legalization. He clarified that in his view both alcohol and cannabis were perfectly fine, but that both should be consumed within an appropriate context.

As Second Mayor, he chairs the supervisory boards of several city-owned companies, including Deutsche Theater Betriebs-GmbH, Gasteig München GmbH, Internationale Münchner Filmwochen GmbH, Münchner Volkstheater GmbH, and Pasinger Fabrik Kultur- und Bürgerzentrum GmbH. He also serves as a supervisory board member of SWM München GmbH, SWM Service GmbH, and Bayerngas GmbH.

In December 2024, Munich's Greens elected Krause as their mayoral candidate for the March 2026 election with 99.3% of the vote. He became the first Alliance 90/The Greens candidate to reach a mayoral runoff in Munich. He received 29.5% in the first round and faced incumbent Dieter Reiter of the SPD in the runoff on March 22, 2026, which he won with 56.4%.

Political offices
Preceded by Christian Ude	Mayor of Munich; 2026–present	Succeeded by Incumbent
