= Lozna (Someș) =

- Location within Romania

Location
- Country: Romania
- Counties: Sălaj County
- Villages: Valea Loznei, Preluci, Lozna

Physical characteristics
- Mouth: Someș
  - location: Lozna
  - coordinates: 47.3234°N 23.4468°E
- Length: 11 km (6.8 mi)
- Basin size: 22 km^{2} (8.5 sq mi)

Basin features
- Progression: Someș→ Tisza→ Danube→ Black Sea

The Lozna is a left tributary of the river Someș in Romania. It discharges into the Someș in the village Lozna. Its length is 11 km (6.8 mi) and its basin size is 22 km^{2} (8.5 sq mi).
