= Oțelu Roșu =

- Town
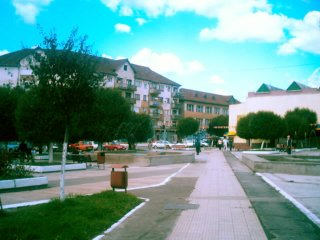
- Town centre

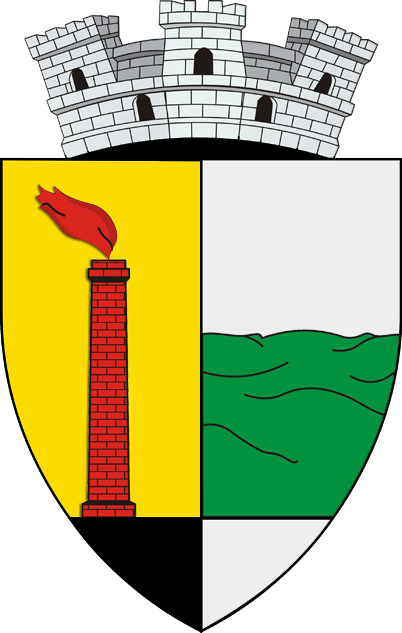
- Coat of arms

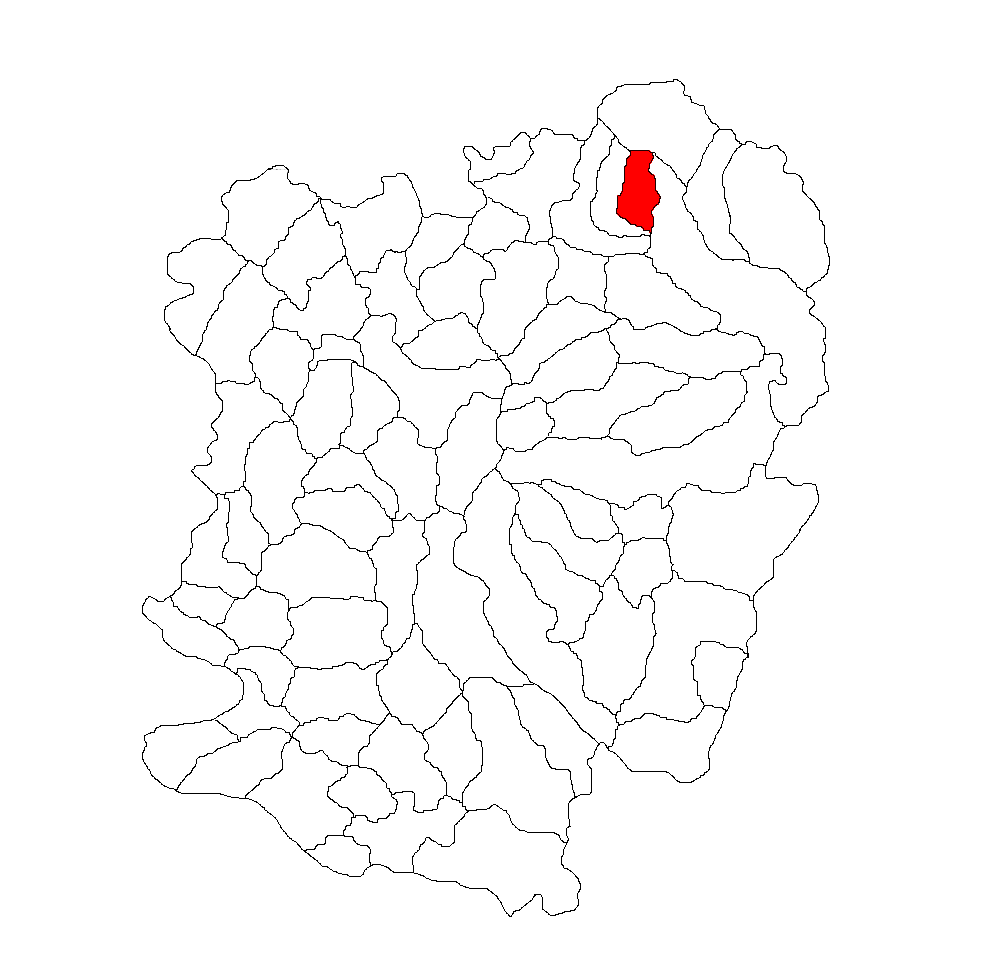
- Location in Caraș-Severin County

- Location in Romania
- Coordinates: 45°31′7″N 22°21′10″E
- Country: Romania
- County: Caraș-Severin

Government
  - Mayor (2024–2028): Luca Mălăiescu (PSD)
- Area: 63.82 km^{2} (24.64 sq mi)
- Elevation: 268 m (879 ft)
- Population (2021-12-01): 8,497
  - Density: 133.1/km^{2} (344.8/sq mi)
- Time zone: UTC+02:00 (EET)
  - Summer (DST): UTC+03:00 (EEST)
- Postal code: 325700
- Area code: (+40) 02 55
- Vehicle reg.: CS
- Website: otelu-rosu.ro

Oțelu Roșu (Romanian pronunciation: [oˌt͡selu ˈroʃu], lit. (the) “Red Steel”; formerly Ferdinand; Hungarian: Nándorhegy; German: Ferdinandsberg) is a town in northeastern Caraș-Severin County, Romania, in the Bistra Valley. It is situated on the national road 68, between Caransebeș (21 km away) and Hațeg. The town administers two villages, Cireșa (Bisztracseres) and Mal (Mál). It is situated in the historical region of Banat.

== Geography ==
Oțelu Roșu is located at an altitude of approximately 300 metres (980 feet) in the Bistra River valley, which lies between the Poiana Ruscă Mountains to the north and the Țarcu Mountains to the south. To the south of Oțelu Roșu is a large piedmont of the Țarcu Mountains, locally named Gai. To the north the town makes direct contact with the foothills of the Poiana Ruscă Mountains. Dominant heights are the hill of Ferdinand (overlooking the foundry) and the hill of Chiciura.

Oțelu Roșu is subjected to west European climatic influences because of its altitude and location. The altitude and the neighbouring forests and mountains ensure a mild climate. In the winter, snow may persist as much as two or three months, however the temperatures do not drop too low. In the spring months, especially May, floods are possible due to the melting of the snow in the high areas of the Țarcu Mountains and abundant rains. The most recent flood took place in the year 2000, destroying several bridges across the river Bistra.

== History ==
The first signs of human habitation date from the Paleolithic, in form of primitive tools. Sporadic remnants from the Neolithic age have been found in the neighbouring areas.

During the wars between Romans and Dacians, the Bistra Valley was the route used by the emperor Trajan in penetrating into the heartland of Dacia. A Roman castrum can be found near the cemetery of Zăvoi (ancient Agnaviae), a settlement close to Oțelu Roșu.

In the fifteenth century, during medieval times, Oțelu Roșu was mentioned under the name of "Bistra", and later with the Hungarian name of Nándorhegy. After the expulsion of Turks from Banat by the Habsburgs, the area was colonised by Germans and the place named Ferdinandsberg after emperor Ferdinand. Also, Italians were brought in to work in metalworking industry. Within the Kingdom of Hungary, the town was part of Krassó-Szörény County from 1881 to 1918. In the aftermath of World War I and the ensuing Hungarian–Romanian War, the Romanian Army entered the town. Following the Treaty of Trianon in 1920, the northeastern part of the Banat became part of the Kingdom of Romania, and the name of Nándorhegy was replaced with Ferdinand. During the interwar period, the town fell within Plasa Caransebeș of Severin County.

After 1947, the name Ferdinand did not please the Communist government, who changed it to Oțelu Roșu ("[The] Red Steel") in order to underline the importance of the town's metalworking industry.

== Population ==
Historical population
Year	Pop.	±%
1966	8,568	—
1977	11,618	+35.6%
1992	13,056	+12.4%
2002	13,128	+0.6%
2011	9,260	−29.5%
2021	8,497	−8.2%
Source: Census data

The population was 8,497 in 2021, down from 9,260 in 2011 and 13,128 in 2002. Causes of this demographic regress are among others the problems of the metalworking industry and the high unemployment, making many young people leave the town and move into regional centres such as Timișoara and other areas of Romania.

92.98% of inhabitants are Romanians, 2.09% Germans, 3.23% Hungarians, and 0.86% Roma. After the Romanian Revolution of 1989, most of the town's Germans, Italians and Slovaks emigrated. In 2002, 76.7% of residents were Romanian Orthodox, 11.4% Roman Catholic, 4.8% Pentecostal, 4.4% Baptist, and 1% Reformed.

== Natives ==
- Axel Azzola (born 1937), German lawyer
- Friedrich Karl Azzola (born 1931), German chemist and historian
- Andreas Jurca (born 1987), German politician
- Iosif Lereter (born 1933), footballer
- Adrian Mărkuș (born 1992), footballer

== Climate ==
Oțelu Roșu has a humid continental climate (Cfb in the Köppen climate classification).

Climate data for Oțelu Roșu
Month	Jan	Feb	Mar	Apr	May	Jun	Jul	Aug	Sep	Oct	Nov	Dec	Year
Mean daily maximum °C (°F)	1.7 (35.1)	3.5 (38.3)	8.3 (46.9)	14.6 (58.3)	19 (66)	22.1 (71.8)	24 (75)	24.4 (75.9)	19.4 (66.9)	14.5 (58.1)	9.1 (48.4)	3.1 (37.6)	13.6 (56.5)
Daily mean °C (°F)	−2 (28)	−0.3 (31.5)	4 (39)	9.8 (49.6)	14.5 (58.1)	18 (64)	19.8 (67.6)	19.9 (67.8)	15.1 (59.2)	9.9 (49.8)	5.1 (41.2)	−0.4 (31.3)	9.4 (48.9)
Mean daily minimum °C (°F)	−5.5 (22.1)	−4 (25)	−0.4 (31.3)	4.4 (39.9)	9.1 (48.4)	12.8 (55.0)	14.7 (58.5)	14.7 (58.5)	10.7 (51.3)	5.8 (42.4)	1.7 (35.1)	−3.6 (25.5)	5.0 (41.1)
Average precipitation mm (inches)	75 (3.0)	70 (2.8)	82 (3.2)	110 (4.3)	119 (4.7)	131 (5.2)	118 (4.6)	98 (3.9)	96 (3.8)	76 (3.0)	72 (2.8)	82 (3.2)	1,129 (44.5)
Source: https://en.climate-data.org/europe/romania/caras-severin/otelu-rosu-10739/

== Education ==
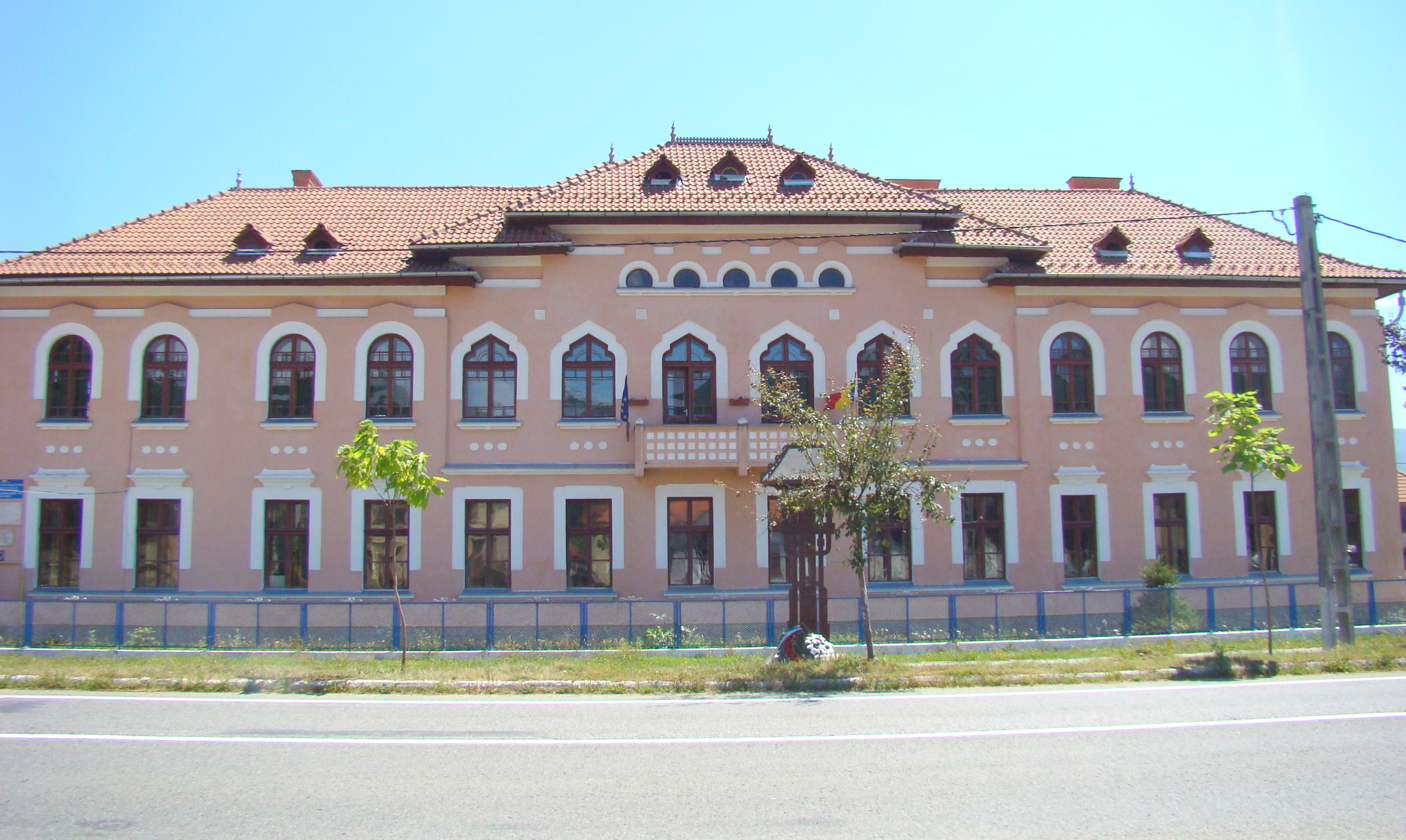
Gymnasium School no. 1, with wayside cross in front

The town has two schools, Generală 1 and Generală 3, plus one industrial high school.
