= Markus Walbrunn =

German politician (born 1987)

Member of the Landtag of Bavaria
- Incumbent
- Assumed office 30 October 2023
- Constituency: Upper Bavaria

Personal details
- Born: 6 February 1987 (age 39)
- Party: Alternative for Germany (since 2015)

Markus Walbrunn (born 6 February 1987) is a German politician serving as a member of the Landtag of Bavaria since 2023. He has served as chairman of the Alternative for Germany in western and central Munich since 2015.
