= Obreja =

- Commune
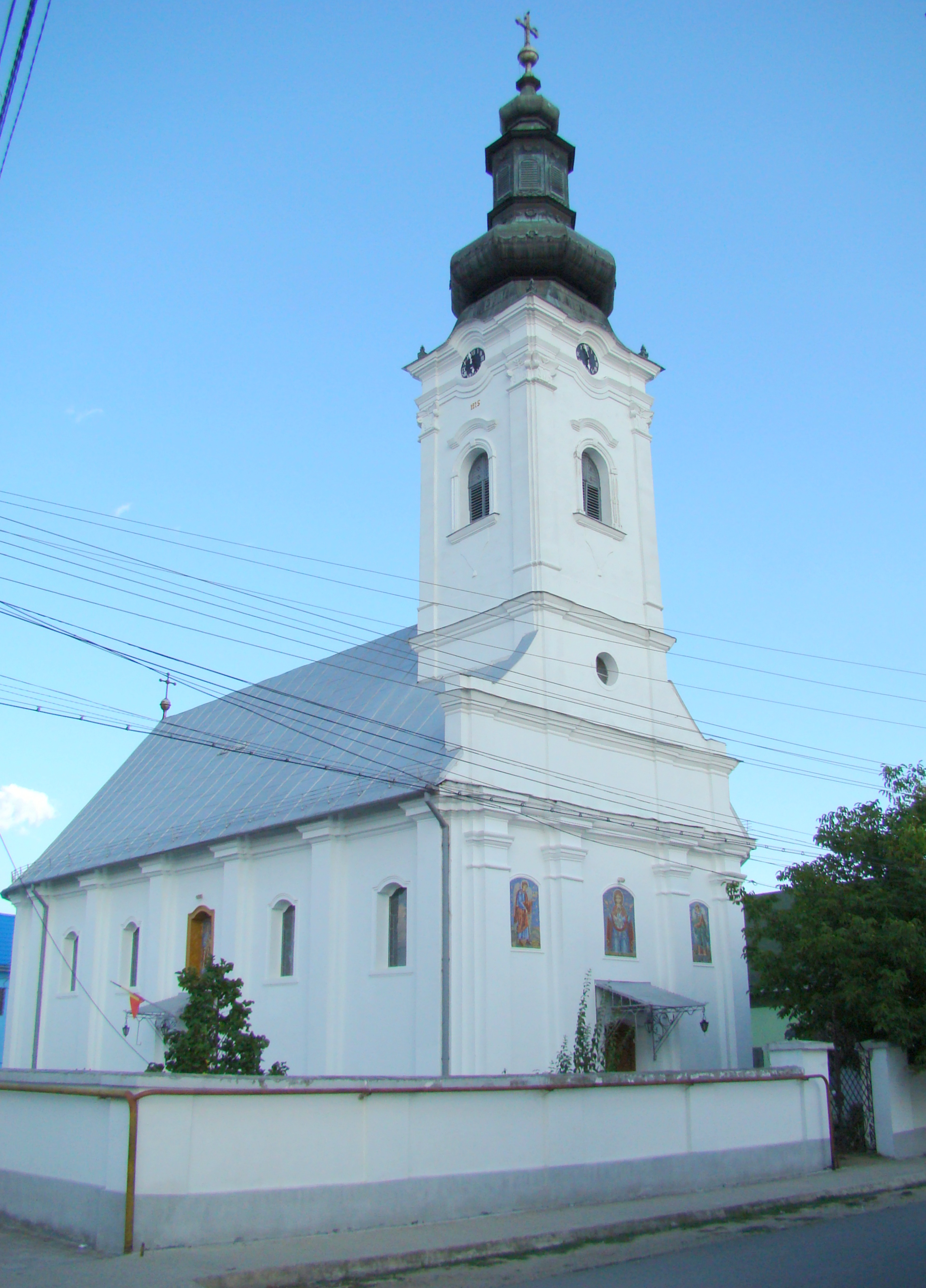
- Orthodox church in Obreja

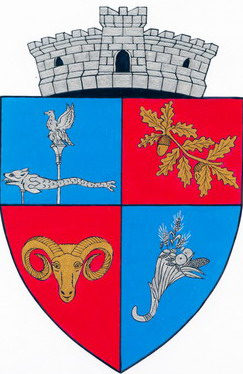
- Coat of arms

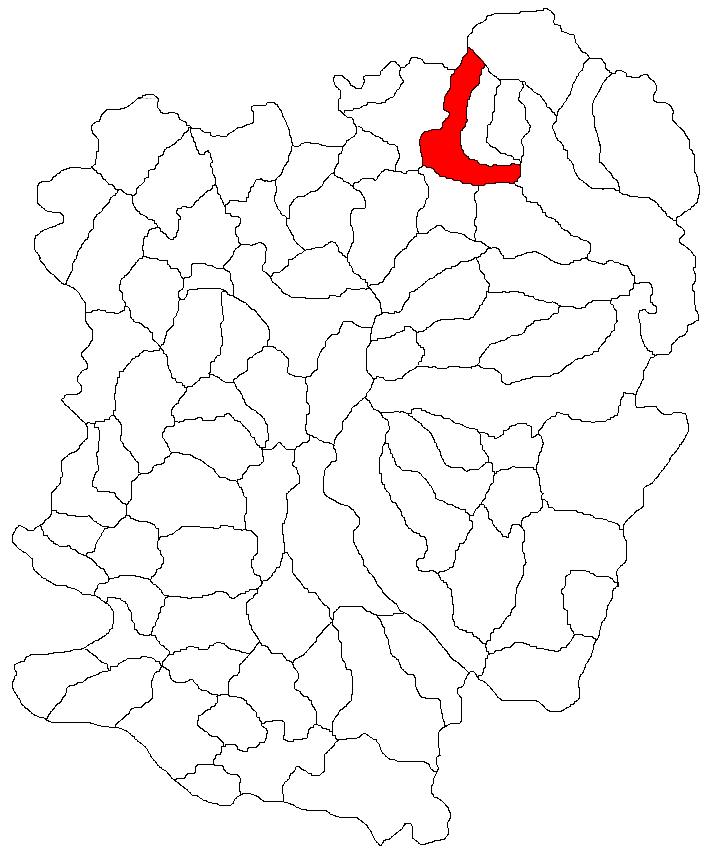
- Location in Caraș-Severin County

- Location in Romania
- Coordinates: 45°28′N 22°15′E
- Country: Romania
- County: Caraș-Severin
- Established: 1547

Government
  - Mayor (2020–2024): Ion Peia (PSD)
- Area: 126.33 km^{2} (48.78 sq mi)
- Elevation: 205 m (673 ft)
- Population (2021-12-01): 3,239
  - Density: 25.64/km^{2} (66.41/sq mi)
- Time zone: UTC+02:00 (EET)
  - Summer (DST): UTC+03:00 (EEST)
- Postal code: 327285
- Area code: +(40) x55
- Vehicle reg.: CS
- Website: primaria-obreja.ro

Obreja (Hungarian: Obrézsa) is a commune in Caraș-Severin County, western Romania with a population of 3,239 as of 2021. It is composed of four villages: Ciuta (Csuta), Iaz (Jász), Obreja, and Var (Vár). It is situated in the historical region of Banat.

The commune is located in the northern part of the county, on the border with Timiș County. It is crossed by national road DN68, which connects it to the municipality of Caransebeș, 9 km (5.6 mi) to the south, and the town of Oțelu Roșu, 9 km to the northeast.

Historical population
Year	Pop.	±%
2002	3,249	—
2011	3,252	+0.1%
2021	3,239	−0.4%
Source: Census data

== Natives ==
- Moise Groza (1844–1919), general
- Achim Nica (born 1930), folk music singer
- Luca Novac (1941–2021), musician
- Ilie Sârbu (born 1950), theologian, economist, and politician
