= Băuțar =

- Commune
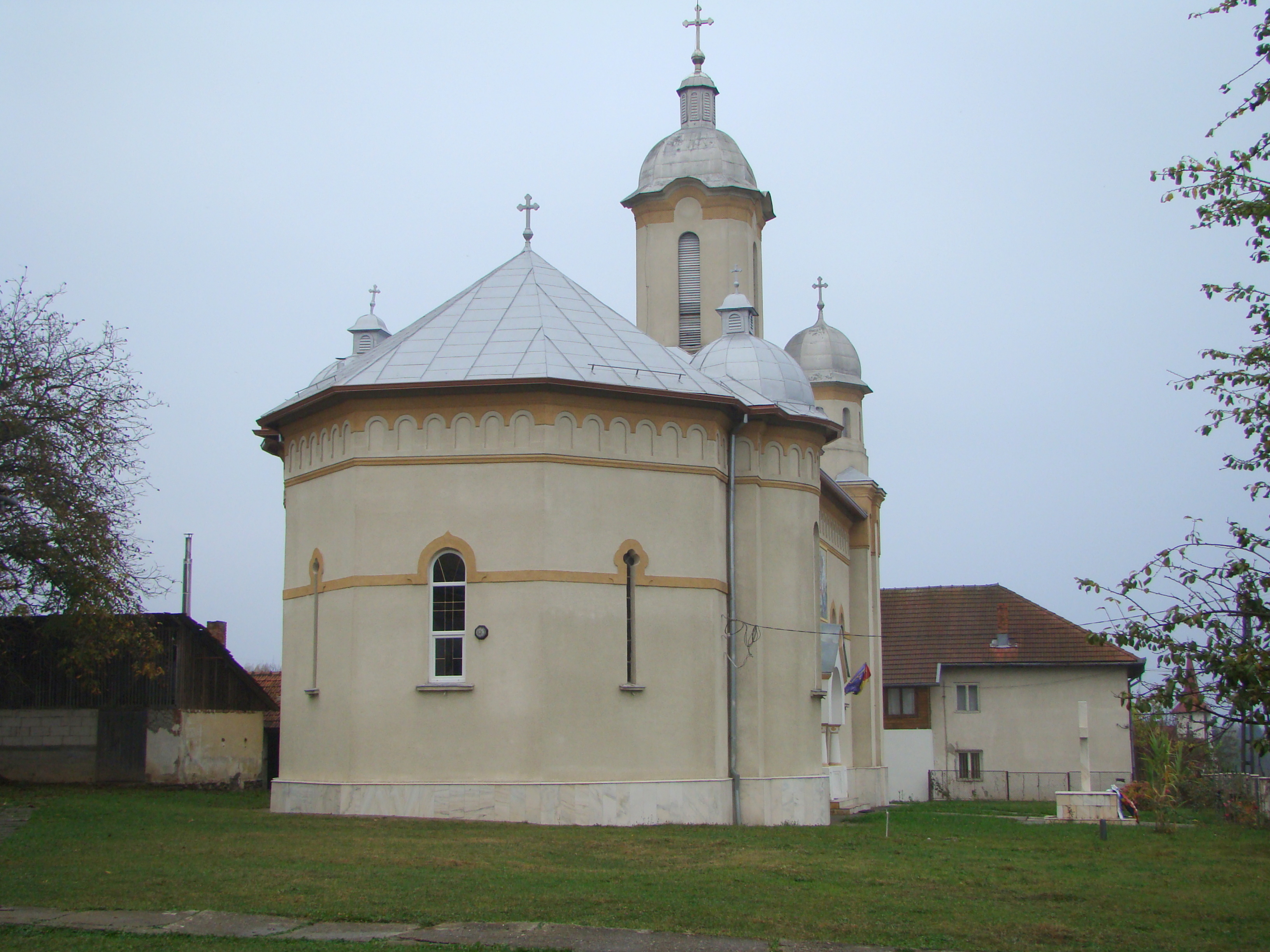
- St. Elijah Church in Băuțar

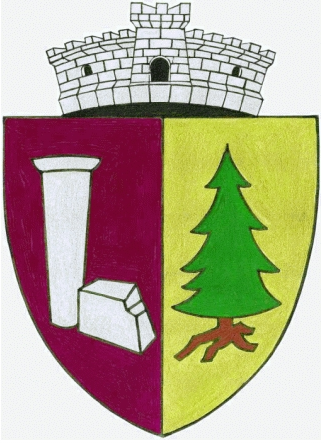
- Coat of arms

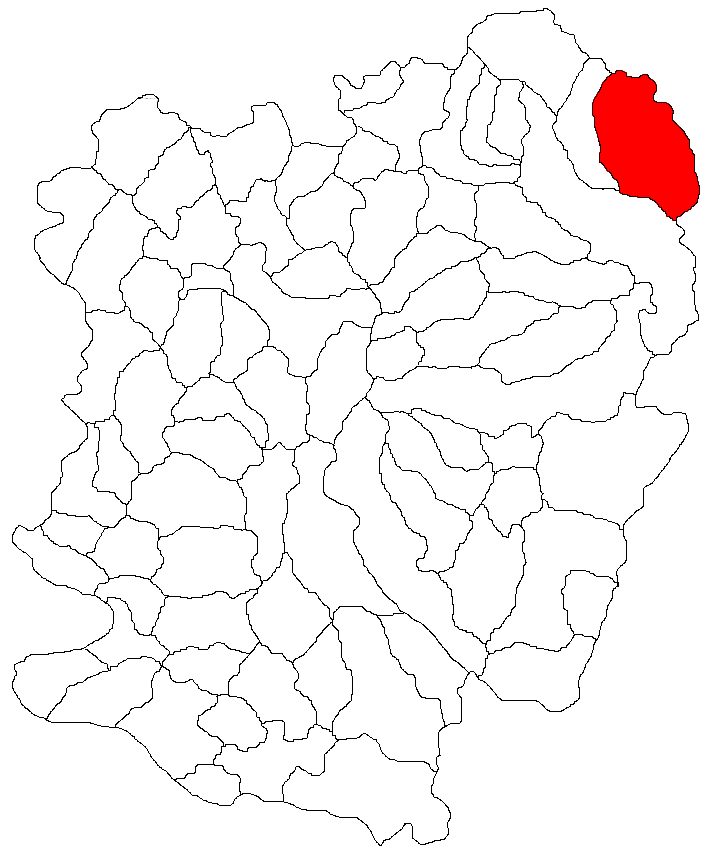
- Location in Caraș-Severin County

- Location in Romania
- Coordinates: 45°31′N 22°34′E
- Country: Romania
- County: Caraș-Severin

Government
  - Mayor (2024–2028): Romeo-Silviu Răduță (PNL)
- Area: 187.98 km^{2} (72.58 sq mi)
- Elevation: 407 m (1,335 ft)
- Population (2021-12-01): 2,229
  - Density: 11.86/km^{2} (30.71/sq mi)
- Time zone: UTC+02:00 (EET)
  - Summer (DST): UTC+03:00 (EEST)
- Postal code: 327015
- Area code: +40 x55x
- Vehicle reg.: CS
- Website: bautar.ro

Băuțar (Hungarian: Alsóbaucár) is a commune in Caraș-Severin County, western Romania with a population of 2,229 people as of 2021. It is composed of four villages: Băuțar, Bucova (Bukova), Cornișoru (Strimba), and Preveciori.

The commune is located in the northeastern part of the county, on the border with Hunedoara County. It is the only commune in the county located in the historical region of Transylvania; the rest is in the Banat.

The route of the Via Transilvanica long-distance trail passes through Băuțar, where the Terra Dacica section of the trail ends, and the Terra Banatica section begins.

Historical population
Year	Pop.	±%
1880	972	—
1910	1,255	+29.1%
1930	1,260	+0.4%
1977	1,828	+45.1%
2002	2,813	+53.9%
2011	2,604	−7.4%
2021	2,229	−14.4%
Source: Census data
