= Andreas Jurca =

German politician (born 1987)

Member of the Landtag of Bavaria
- Incumbent
- Assumed office 30 October 2023

Personal details
- Born: 21 October 1987 (age 38)
- Party: Alternative for Germany (since 2014)

Andreas Jurca (born 21 October 1987) is a Romanian-born German politician serving as a member of the Landtag of Bavaria since 2023. He has served as chairman of the Alternative for Germany in Augsburg since 2019.
