= Rusca Montană =

- Commune
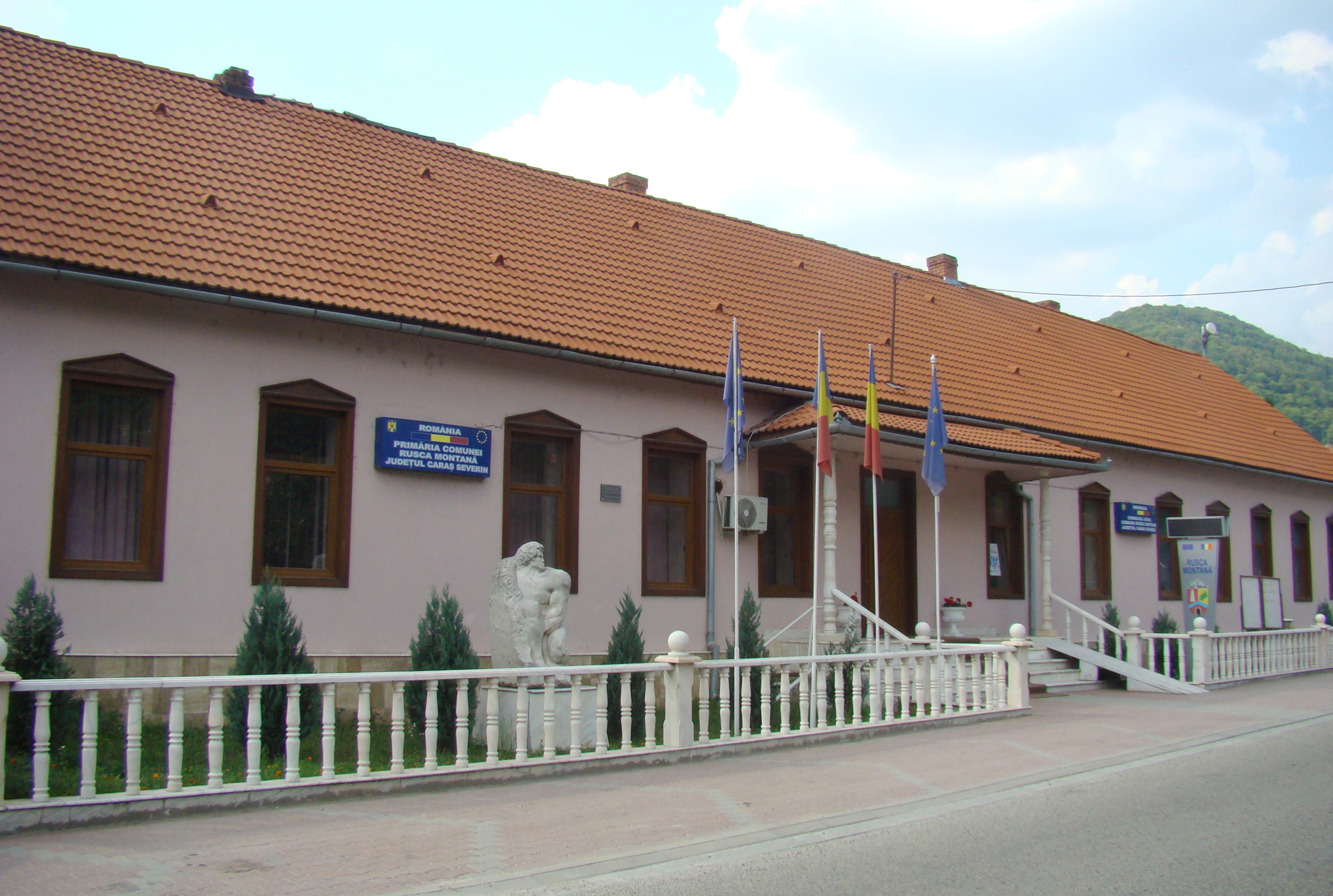
- Town hall

- Coat of arms

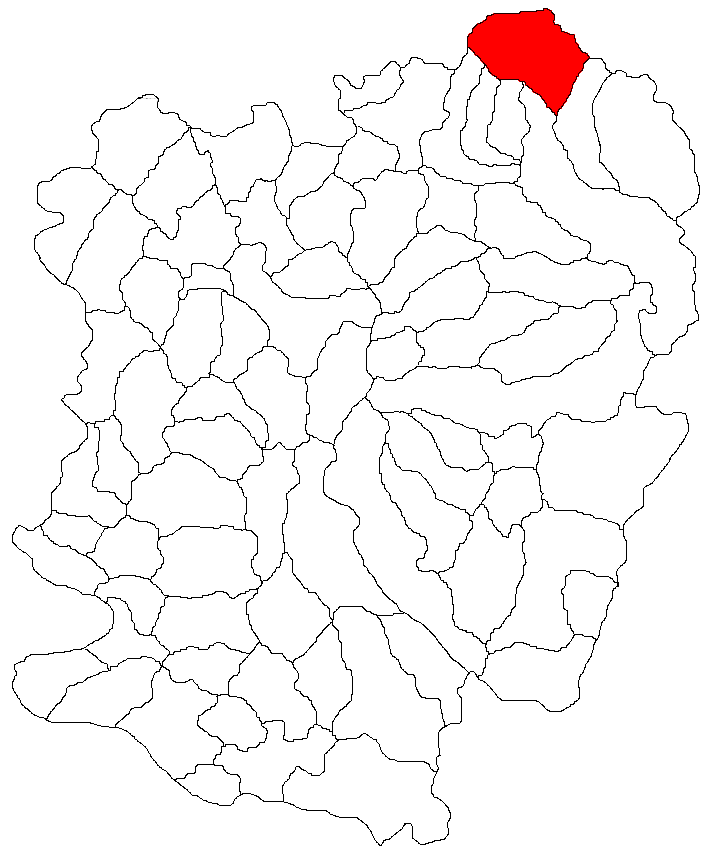
- Location in Caraș-Severin County

- Location in Romania
- Coordinates: 45°34′N 22°27′E
- Country: Romania
- County: Caraș-Severin

Government
  - Mayor (2024–2028): Sergiu Adrian Toma (PSD)
- Area: 154.68 km^{2} (59.72 sq mi)
- Elevation: 880 m (2,890 ft)
- Population (2021-12-01): 1,530
  - Density: 9.89/km^{2} (25.6/sq mi)
- Time zone: UTC+02:00 (EET)
  - Summer (DST): UTC+03:00 (EEST)
- Postal code: 327320
- Area code: +(40) 0255
- Vehicle reg.: CS
- Website: primariaruscamontana.ro

Rusca Montană (Hungarian: Ruszkabánya; German: Rußberg or Ruskberg) is a commune in Caraș-Severin County of Western Romania with a population of 1,530 as of 2021. It is composed of two villages, Rusca Montană and Rușchița (Ruszkica or Ruszkicatelep). It is situated in the historical region of Banat.

Rusca Montană is notable for the marble deposits nearby, which include Rușchița marble.

== Péter Pan ==
Péter Pan (21 September 1897 – 19 September 1918) was an Austro-Hungarian soldier, died in the Battle of Monte Grappa, in the final stages of World War I. He was born at Ruszkabánya, Krassó-Szörény (now Rusca Montană). A museum has been opened in Rusca Montană in his honour and the street where he was born bears his name. The namesake with the well-known literary character makes him famous, his tomb is one of the most visited of Monte Grappa War Cemetery in Italy and flowers, pebbles and shells are often deposited there, as told by Italian journalist Ferdinando Celi in a book about his story.
