= Țarcu Mountains =

Mountain range in Romania

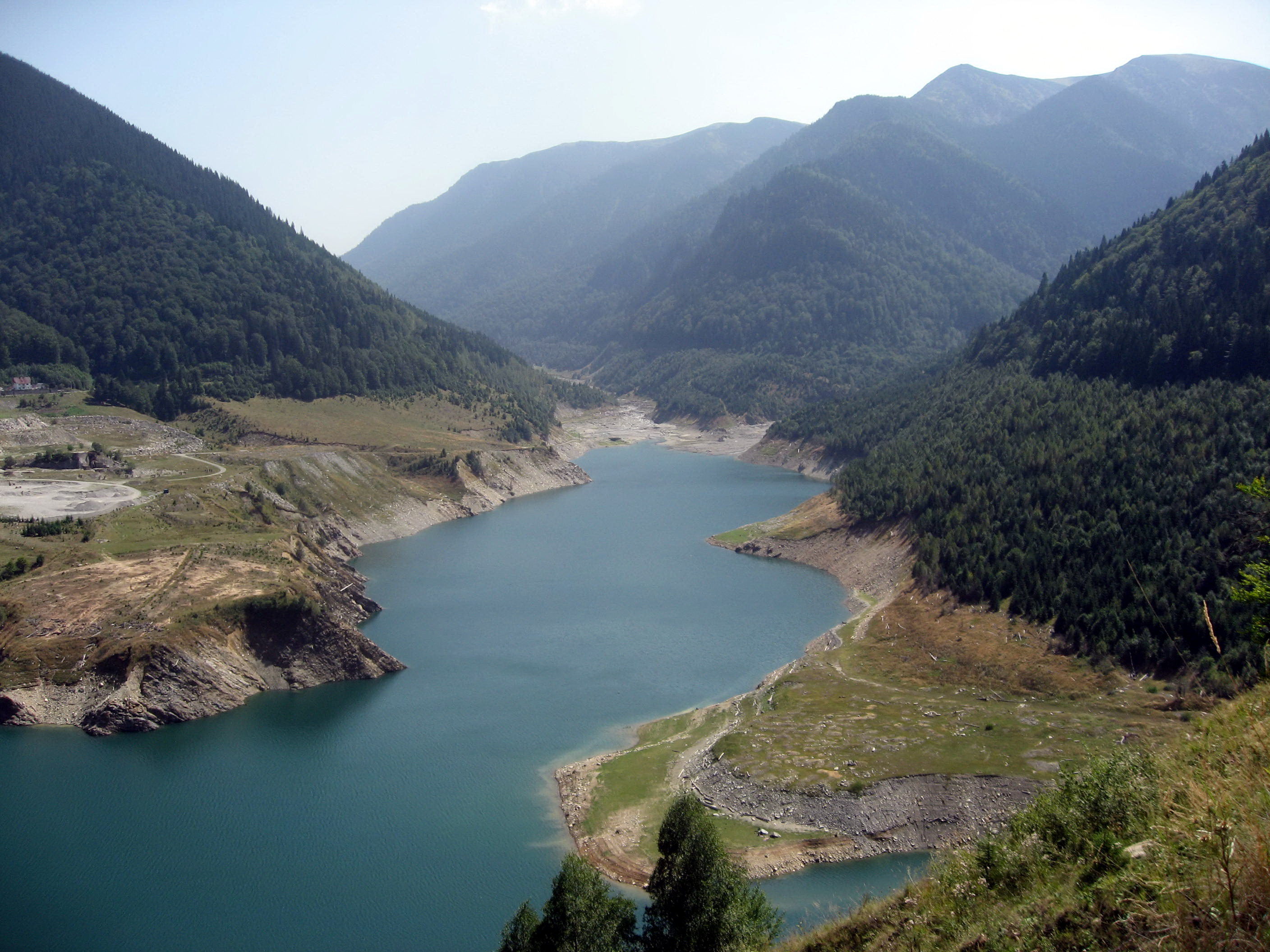

The Țarcu Mountains are a mountain range in southwestern Romania, at the western edge of the Southern Carpathians. They are located between the Bistra Valley (to the south), Timiș River (to the east), Godeanu Mountains (to the northwest) and Râul Mare Valley (to the west), with the Râul Mare Valley serving as their natural border with the Retezat Mountains. They were declared a Natura 2000 protected area in 2007 due to their unique biodiversity. Together with the Retezat, Godeanu and Cerna mountains, they constitute the only intact forest landscape in Europe outside of Russia and Scandinavia.

== Geology ==
Most rocks in the range are crystalline, with few areas with sedimentary rock. As such, the mountains are massifs, cut by narrow valleys. Limestone is found only in a few places. Erosion has formed several very prominent platforms, such as the Borăscu platform. Glaciers were present during the ice ages, leaving glacial calderas and small glacial lakes, such as the Bistra Lake.

== Climate ==
Because of the Western climatic influences, the amount of rainfall in the Țarcu Mountains is quite high. Snow may fall at altitudes above 1500 metres at any time in the year, while the snowpack usually lasts from October or November until June or even July in the glacial calderas of the highest peaks.

Climate data for Țarcu (altitude 2180m, 2014–2026 normals, extremes 1981–present)
Month	Jan	Feb	Mar	Apr	May	Jun	Jul	Aug	Sep	Oct	Nov	Dec	Year
Record high °C (°F)	9.2 (48.6)	10.0 (50.0)	13.3 (55.9)	11.9 (53.4)	16.0 (60.8)	20.7 (69.3)	22.4 (72.3)	23.1 (73.6)	21.5 (70.7)	16.6 (61.9)	13.0 (55.4)	9.2 (48.6)	23.1 (73.6)
Mean daily maximum °C (°F)	−4.6 (23.7)	−3.5 (25.7)	−1.8 (28.8)	1.6 (34.9)	5.5 (41.9)	11.3 (52.3)	13.0 (55.4)	13.6 (56.5)	9.0 (48.2)	5.4 (41.7)	1.5 (34.7)	−2.3 (27.9)	4.1 (39.3)
Daily mean °C (°F)	−7.1 (19.2)	−6.1 (21.0)	−4.4 (24.1)	−1.0 (30.2)	3.1 (37.6)	8.6 (47.5)	10.3 (50.5)	10.9 (51.6)	6.5 (43.7)	2.8 (37.0)	−1.0 (30.2)	−4.8 (23.4)	1.5 (34.7)
Mean daily minimum °C (°F)	−9.7 (14.5)	−8.6 (16.5)	−7.0 (19.4)	−3.6 (25.5)	0.8 (33.4)	5.9 (42.6)	7.6 (45.7)	8.1 (46.6)	4.1 (39.4)	0.3 (32.5)	−3.4 (25.9)	−7.3 (18.9)	−1.1 (30.1)
Record low °C (°F)	−34.4 (−29.9)	−26.7 (−16.1)	−24.0 (−11.2)	−18.4 (−1.1)	−9.6 (14.7)	−6.5 (20.3)	−2.2 (28.0)	−5.2 (22.6)	−9.5 (14.9)	−13.3 (8.1)	−18.7 (−1.7)	−23.7 (−10.7)	−34.4 (−29.9)
Average precipitation mm (inches)	95.8 (3.77)	83.5 (3.29)	69.8 (2.75)	63.6 (2.50)	131.9 (5.19)	121.5 (4.78)	121.8 (4.80)	98.0 (3.86)	90.2 (3.55)	66.7 (2.63)	82.8 (3.26)	77.9 (3.07)	1,103.5 (43.45)
Average precipitation days (≥ 1.0 mm)	12.2	10.5	10.5	9.9	15.8	13.2	11.3	8.5	9.8	8.5	11.9	9.8	131.9
Source: Meteomanz (2014-2026); Infoclimat (1980-2010); ANM

== Important peaks ==
- Vârful Țarcu, 2190 metres, has a weather station on its top.
- Vârful Pietrii, 2192 metres, dominating the Bistra Lake.
- Vârful Căleanu, 2190 metres.
- Muntele Mic, 1802 metres, has a ski resort.
- Măgura Marga, 1503 metres, dominating the Marga village.
- Vârful Cuntu, 1441 metres, has a weather station nearby.
