= Glimboca =

- Commune
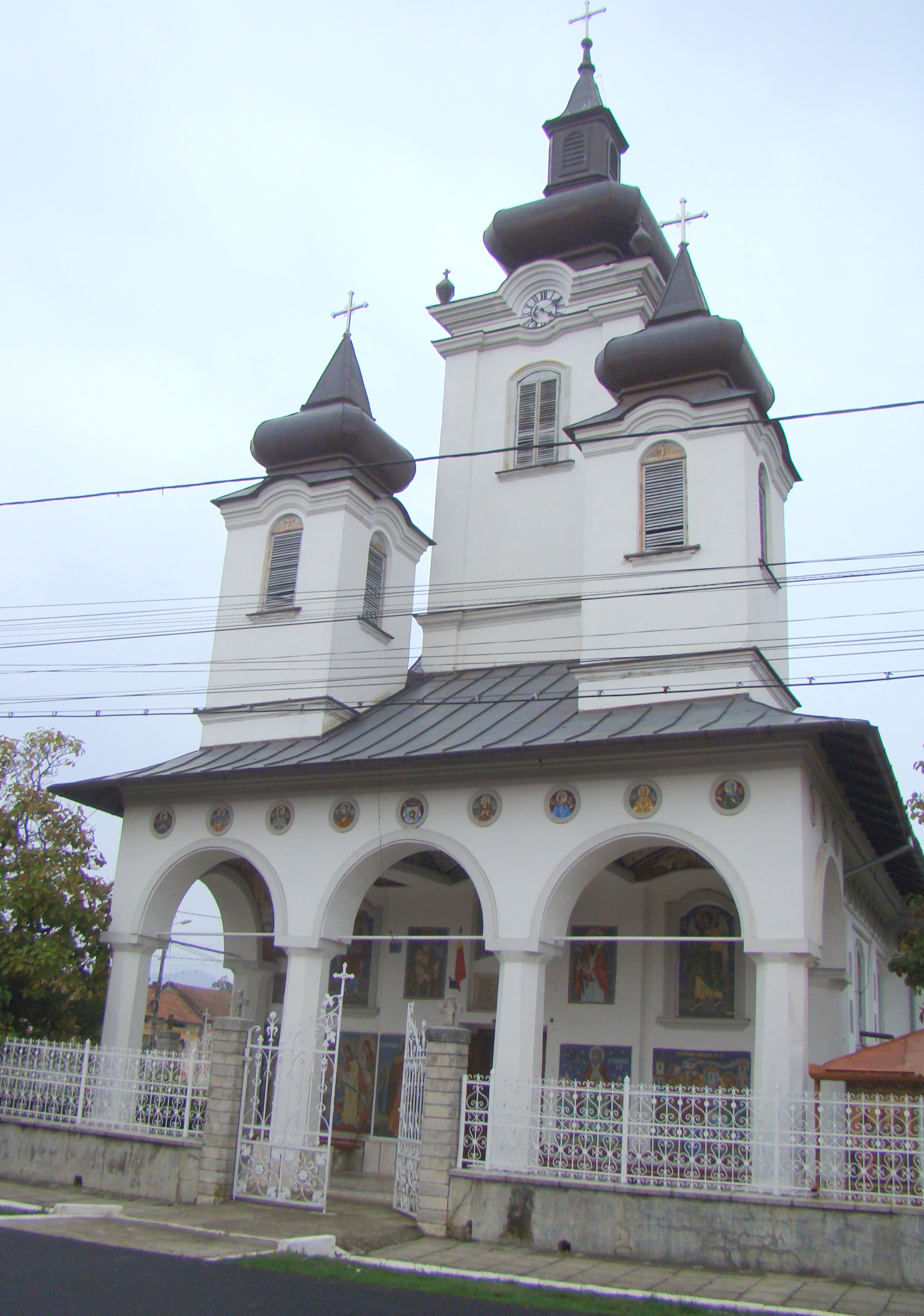
- Church of the Dormition in Glimboca

- Coat of arms

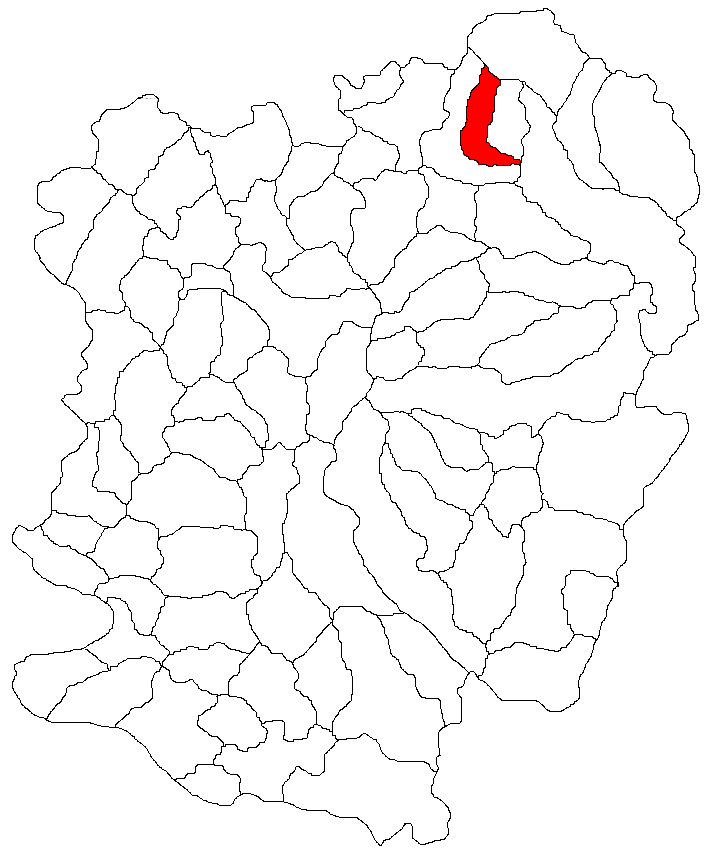
- Location in Caraș-Severin County

- Location in Romania
- Coordinates: 45°29′N 22°19′E
- Country: Romania
- County: Caraș-Severin

Government
  - Mayor (2024–2028): Petru-Novac Crîsnic (PNL)
- Area: 42.46 km^{2} (16.39 sq mi)
- Elevation: 284 m (932 ft)
- Population (2021-12-01): 1,626
  - Density: 38.29/km^{2} (99.18/sq mi)
- Time zone: UTC+02:00 (EET)
  - Summer (DST): UTC+03:00 (EEST)
- Postal code: 327220
- Area code: +(40) 02 55
- Vehicle reg.: CS
- Website: www.primaria-glimboca.ro

Glimboca (Hungarian: Novákfalva) is a commune in Caraș-Severin County, western Romania, with a population of 1,626 people as of 2021. It is composed of a single village, Glimboca.

Historical population
Year	Pop.	±%
1880	1,635	—
1910	2,224	+36.0%
1930	2,262	+1.7%
1977	2,371	+4.8%
2002	1,930	−18.6%
2011	1,808	−6.3%
2021	1,626	−10.1%
Source: Census data
