= Lozna, Sălaj =

Lozna
- Commune
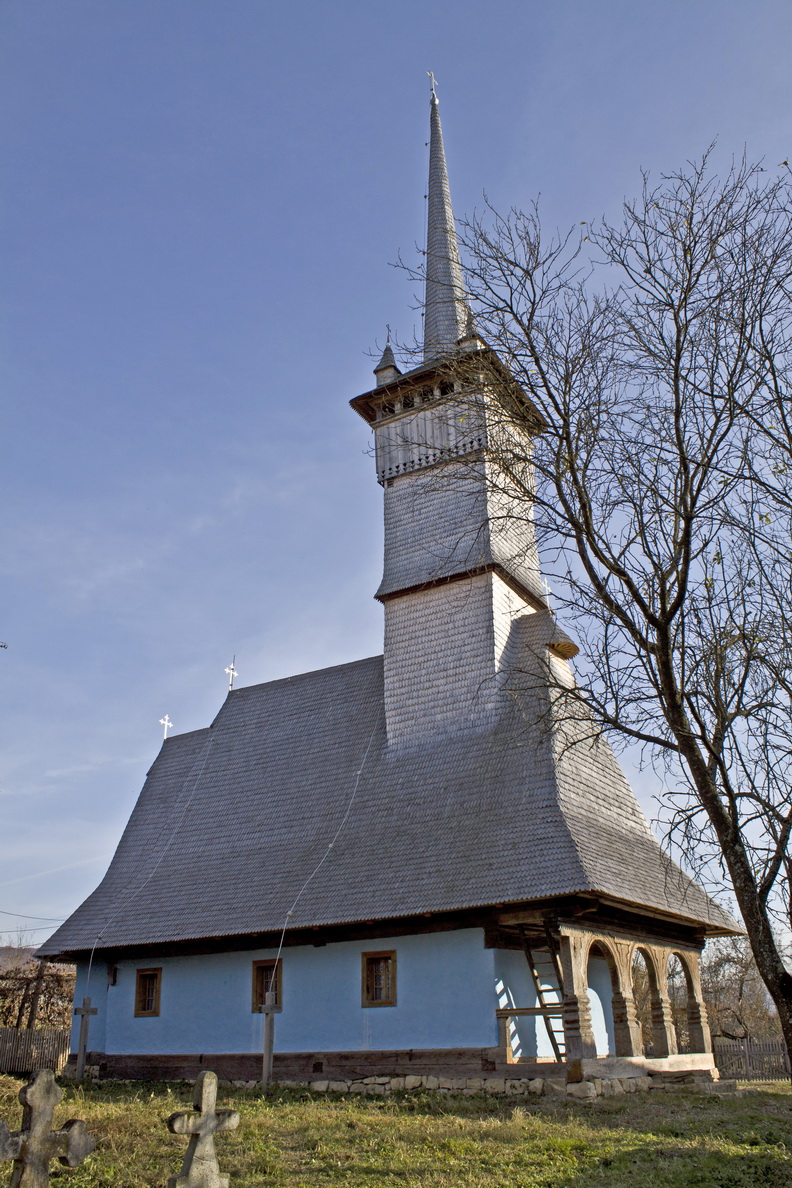
- Wooden church in Lozna

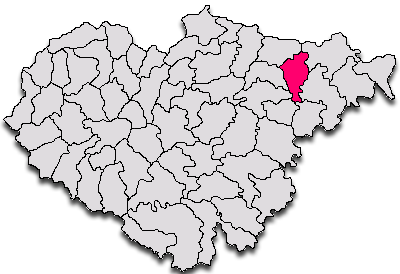
- Location in Sălaj County

- Location in Romania
- Coordinates: 47°19′18″N 23°28′10″E
- Country: Romania
- County: Sălaj

Government
  - Mayor (2020–2024): Alin Gabriel Pocol (PNL)
- Area: 61.13 km^{2} (23.60 sq mi)
- Elevation: 204 m (669 ft)
- Population (2021-12-01): 1,027
  - Density: 16.80/km^{2} (43.51/sq mi)
- Time zone: UTC+02:00 (EET)
  - Summer (DST): UTC+03:00 (EEST)
- Postal code: 457225
- Area code: +(40) 260
- Vehicle reg.: SJ
- Website: www.primarialozna.ro

Lozna (Hungarian: Nagylózna) is a commune located in Sălaj County, Transylvania, Romania. It is composed of five villages: Cormeniș (Ködmönös), Lozna, Preluci (Kőlózna), Valea Leșului (Lesvölgy), and Valea Loznei (Lóznavölgy).

Historical population
Year	Pop.	±%
1850	1,575	—
1880	1,822	+15.7%
1900	2,049	+12.5%
1910	2,304	+12.4%
1920	2,253	−2.2%
1930	2,589	+14.9%
1941	2,803	+8.3%
1956	2,833	+1.1%
1966	2,387	−15.7%
1977	2,044	−14.4%
1992	1,276	−37.6%
2002	1,195	−6.3%
2011	1,072	−10.3%
2021	1,027	−4.2%
Source: Census data

== Sights ==
- Wooden church of Lozna (built 1813)
- Wooden church of Preluci (built 1875
- Wooden church of Valea Loznei (built 1870)
