= Marga, Caraș-Severin =

Marga
- Commune
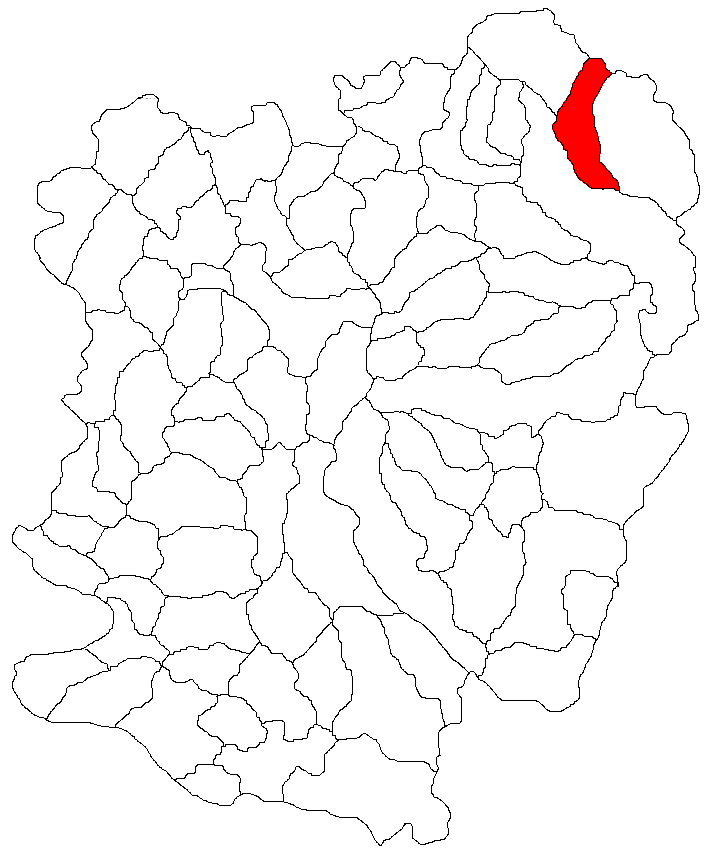
- Location in Caraș-Severin County

- Location in Romania
- Coordinates: 45°30′N 22°31′E
- Country: Romania
- County: Caraș-Severin
- Population (2021-12-01): 900
- Time zone: EET/EEST (UTC+2/+3)
- Vehicle reg.: CS

Marga (Hungarian: Márga) is a commune in Caraș-Severin County, western Romania with a population of 1.300 people. It is composed of two villages, Marga and Vama Marga (Vámosmárga). It is situated in the historical region of Banat.
