= List of rivers of Romania: C =

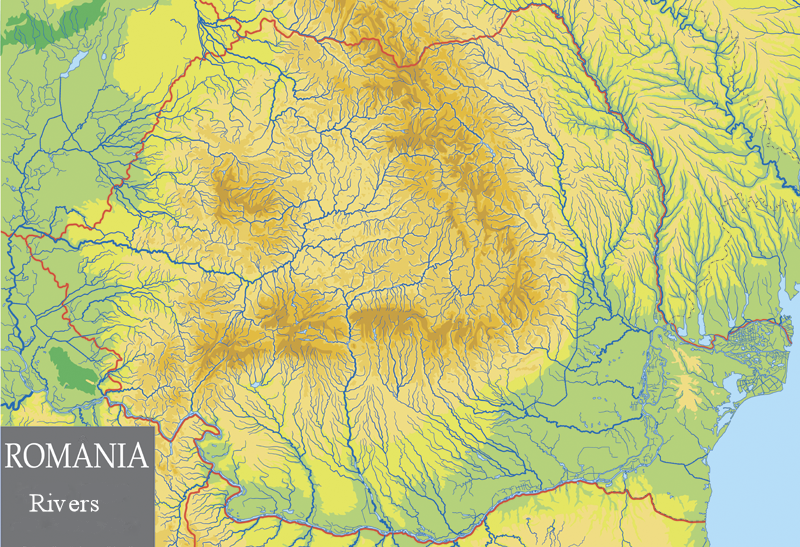
Map of Romania's hydrographic network

== C ==
River	Tributary of
Cacaina	Bahlui
Cacova	Govora
Cad	Olt
Căian	Mureș
Căiuți	Trotuș
Călata	Crișul Repede
Călimănel	Mureș
Călimănel	Neagra
Călinești	Olt
Călmățui	Danube (Buzău and Brăila Counties)
Călmățui	Danube (Olt and Teleorman Counties)
Călmățui	Siret
Călmățuiul Sec	Călmățui
Călmuș	Tazlăul Sărat
Câlnău	Buzău
Câlnău	Dâmbovița
Câlneș	Bistrița
Câlnic	Gilort
Câlnic	Secaș
Câlniștea	Neajlov
Câlniștea Mică	Câlniștea
Călui	Olteț
Calul	Bistrița
Calva	Vișa
Camăr	Barcău
Camenița	Danube
Caminca	Trotuș
Câmp	Uz
Câmpea	Prahova
Câmpulungeanca	Slănic
Canaraua Fetei	Danube
Căoi	Mureș
Capra	Bicaz
Căpuș	Someșul Mic
Caracal	Olt
Caraclău	Trotuș
Caraș	Danube
Caraslău	Oituz
Carastelec	Crasna
Caraula	Suceava
Cârcinov	Argeș
Cârgrea	Cungra
Cârlibaba	Bistrița
Cârligați	Trebeș
Cârpeștii Mici	Topa
Cartal	Casimcea
Cârțibavul Mare	Someșul Mare
Cârțișoara	Olt
Cascue	Dâmbovița
Casimcea	Lake Tașaul
Cașin	Râul Negru
Cașin	Trotuș
Cășla	Elan
Cășoaca Mare	Buzău
Cașva	Gurghiu
Cătăuț	Râmnicul Sărat
Cătușa	Siret
Cavnic	Lăpuș
Ceaca	Șimișna
Ceair	Almălău
Ceair	Urluia
Cenușarul	Câlniștea
Cepturaru	Olt

River	Tributary of
Cerăsei	Barcău
Cerchez	Ceair
Cerchezoaia	Prut
Cerghid	Niraj
Cerna	Crasna
Cerna	Danube (southwestern Romania)
Cerna	Danube (Tulcea County)
Cerna	Mureș
Cerna	Olteț
Cernabora	Timiș
Cernat	Bâsca
Cernat	Râul Doamnei
Cernișoara	Cerna
Cernița	Abrud
Cernu	Tazlău
Certej	Mureș
Cetea	Borod
Cetea	Galda
Checheț	Ier
Chechiș	Lăpuș
Cheia	Arieș
Cheia	Olănești
Cherăstău	Timișana
Cheț	Barcău
Cheud	Someș
Chichirgeaua	Danube
Chijic	Crișul Repede
Chindeni	Mureș
Chineja	Prut
Chiojdeanca	Cricovul Sărat
Chiricanu	Neajlov
Chiriș	Fizeș
Chirița	Bahlui
Chirui	Vârghiș
Chișer	Crișul Alb
Chisindia	Crișul Alb
Chițiu	Jiu
Chiua	Șușița
Chiuzbaia	Săsar
Chizdia	Bega
Cib	Băcâia
Ciban	Sebeș
Cibin	Olt
Cicârlău	Someș
Ciclova	Caraș
Cigher	Crișul Alb
Cinca	Timișana
Cincu	Olt
Cioara	Arieș
Cioara	Mureș
Ciobănuș	Trotuș
Ciocadia	Gilort
Cioiana	Jiu
Ciolac	Bașeu
Ciolt	Chisindia
Ciopa	Bârzava
Ciorâca	Vedea
Ciorman	Dobra
Ciornovăț	Caraș
Ciorogârla	Sabar
Cireș	Bâsca
Cireș	Coțatcu

River	Tributary of
Ciric	Bahlui
Ciripicea	Checheț
Cisla	Vișeu
Cisnădie	Cibin
Ciubota	Tutova
Ciucic	Mureș
Ciucurova	Slava
Ciugheș	Trotuș
Ciugud	Mureș
Ciunca	Bahlueț
Ciunget	Dofteana
Ciurlac	Moldova
Cladova	Bega
Cladova	Mureș
Clănița	Teleorman
Cleceova	Crișul Alb
Climăuț	Suceava
Clopodia	Moravița
Cloșcoi	Medeș
Cobășel	Someșul Mare
Cobia	Potop
Cobleș	Arieșul Mare
Coca	Slănic
Cocioc	Sabar
Cociovaliștea	Ialomița
Cocorova	Gilort
Cocoș	Danube–Black Sea Canal
Cojmănești	Jilțul Slivilești
Colceag	Mostiștea
Colentina	Dâmbovița
Colițca	Crasna
Comana	Olt
Comarna	Jijia
Comarnic	Caraș
Conop	Mureș
Conțeasca	Siret
Copăș	Bârzava
Corâta	Mostiștea
Corbeni	Valea Fânețelor
Corbu	Bistricioara
Corhana	Crișul Repede
Corlat	Olt
Cormaia	Someșul Mare
Cormoș	Olt
Cornul	Șușița
Corogea	Prut
Corozel	Bârlad
Corund	Târnava Mică
Cosău	Mara
Coșei	Maja
Cosmina	Telega
Coșna	Bancu
Costești	Bistrița
Coșuștea	Motru
Coșuștea Mică	Coșuștea
Cotârgaci	Morișca
Coțatcu	Râmnicul Sărat
Cotmeana	Vedea
Cotorca	Ialomița
Covasna	Jijia
Covasna	Râul Negru
Coveș	Hârtibaciu
Covurlui	Chineja
Coza	Putna

River	Tributary of
Cozancea	Sitna
Cozd	Homorod
Cozia	Bohotin
Cozmeni	Fișag
Cracău	Bistrița
Cracăul Alb	Cracău
Cracăul Negru	Cracău
Crăciun	Drăgan
Crăiasa	Crișul Negru
Craica	Lăpuș
Crainici	Motru
Craiova	Cerna
Crasna	Bârlad
Crasna	Buzău
Crasna	Teleajen
Crasna	Tisza
Crasna Veche	Crasna
Creanga Mare	Târnava Mică
Creanga Mică	Târnava Mare
Cremeneț	Șușița
Cremenița	Răchita
Crevedia	Colentina
Crevedia	Jiul de Vest
Cricău	Galda
Cricovul Dulce	Ialomița
Cricovul Sărat	Prahova
Criș	Târnava Mare
Criștior	Crișul Negru
Cristolțel	Solona
Cristur	Cerna
Crișul Alb	Körös
Crișul Băița	Crișul Negru
Crișul Mic	Barcău
Crișul Mic	Crișul Negru
Crișul Negru	Körös
Crișul Nou	Crișul Negru
Crișul Pietros	Crișul Negru
Crișul Repede	Körös
Crivadia	Strei
Crivăț	Ialomița
Crizbav	Olt
Cropandă	Crișul Repede
Crușov	Olt
Cubic	Ier
Cucuieți	Tazlău
Cucuiș	Sibișel
Cucuteni	Bahlueț
Cucuveanu	Argova
Cuejdiu	Bistrița
Cugir	Mureș
Cuieșd	Mureș
Cumpăna	Argeș
Cumpăna	Topolog
Cund	Târnava Mică
Cungra	Olt
Cungrea	Cungrișoara
Cungrișoara	Olt
Cupaș	Bicaz
Curașița	Valea Țiganului
Curciu	Târnava Mare
Curița	Cașin
Curpăt	Sebeș
Cușmed	Târnava Mică
Cvașnița	Ruscova
