= The Hatchet =

Romanian 1930 crime novel by Mihail Sadoveanu

- 1939 edition
- Author: Mihail Sadoveanu
- Original title: Baltagul
- Language: Romanian
- Genre: Crime novel
- Publisher: Cartea Românească
- Publication date: 1930
- Publication place: Romania
- English publication date: 1955
- Media type: Print (Hardback & Paperback)
- Preceded by: Miorița

The Hatchet (orig. Romanian: Baltagul) is a 1930 crime novel that was written by Mihail Sadoveanu.

The novel's main character is Vitoria Lipan, the wife of a shepherd living in the Moldavian village Măgura Tarcăului. Vitoria has a premonition her husband Nechifor, who has gone to the town Dorna to buy more sheep, has died. The local priest and the county's prefect dismiss her premonition but for Vitoria, archaic symbols and superstitions are more trustworthy than the books of the priests or the science of the government officials. She calls home her son Gheorghiță, who is on business in Jijia village, where he waited for news from his father to pay some debts. Vitoria and Gheorghiță embark on a mythical journey, at the end of which they find Nechifor's dead body and take their revenge on the thieves who killed him. The determined and clever Vitoria Lipan is a unique female character in the Romanian traditionalist novel, despite the female stereotypes.

The Hatchet is considered Sadoveanu's greatest work and a creative adaptation of themes from the famous Romanian ballad Miorița, which inspired the novel. The novel uses the ballad's epic structure, and the conflict between the three villagers and Vitoria's perseverance in the search for her dead husband. The author was also inspired by other popular, mid-19th-century ballads by Vasile Alecsandri; "Șalga", from which comes the theme of the courageous village woman who searches for groups of thieves and takes revenge for their crimes – and "Dolca", from which the author took the link between humans and nature.

The Hatchet is considered a monograph of a traditional Romanian village because it shows the aspects of the village typology with Romanian traditions and superstitions; baptism, wedding, and funeral. The title is based on the weapon that makes both criminals confess but also refers to the weapon with which the dead shepherd was murdered. The novel is divided into 16 chapters. It was adapted into an eponymous movie, Baltagul, which was directed by Mircea Mureșan and premiered in October 1969; Vitoria Lipan was played by Margarita Lozano.

== Plot ==
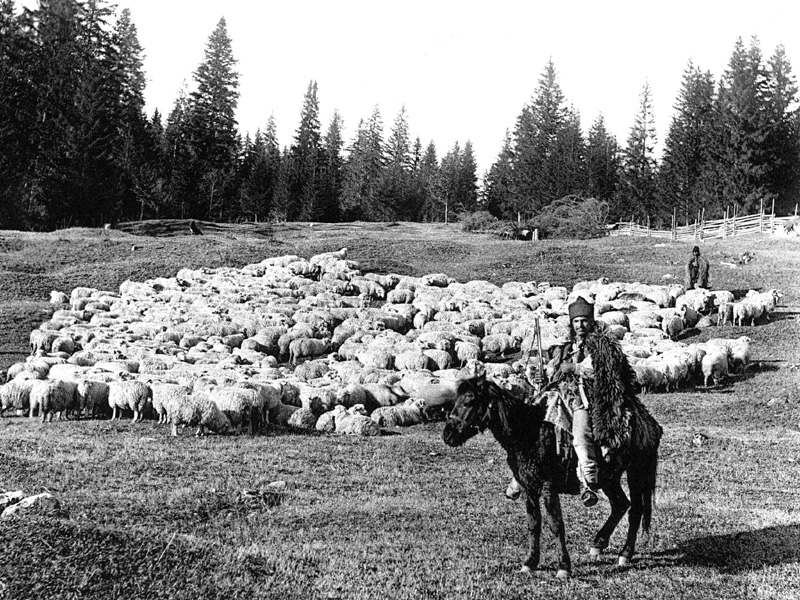
Flock of sheep in the Rarău Mountains at the beginning of the 20th century.

In Dorna, around the Saint Demetrius holiday (26 October), shepherd Nechifor Lipan leaves for Rarău to buy some sheep from a villager. Nechifor does not return home from Tarcău and does not give any sign of life for twenty days. He did move the sheep from Cristești village (close to Iași to their winter pastures in Jijia River). Nechifor needs to pay their debts for fodder and workers' wages, and needs to return home with his son, Gheorghiță. After waiting a month, Nechifor's wife Vitoria dreams one night that Nechifor rides on a horse into the sunset, and she believes he is dead.

After hints from the priest Dănilă and the elder Maranda, Vitoria decides to pray to Saint Mary and to fast for twelve Fridays in a row, hoping Nechifor will eventually return. After Gheorghiță returns home around the winter holidays, Vitoria goes to the Bistrița Monastery to pray to the icon of Saint Anne and request spiritual advice, then leaves for Piatra Neamț to report her husband missing. The county's prefect confirms it is possible Nechifor has been robbed and killed, substantiating Vitoria's fear. The woman decides to search for her husband with Gheorghiță, taking a hatchet to defend themselves from evil-doers.

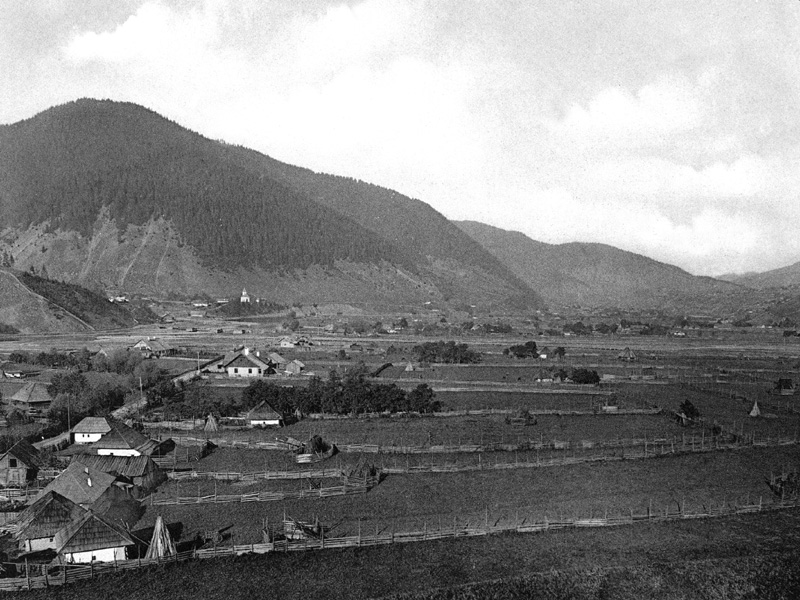
The villages Borca and Sabasa at the beginning of the 20th century. The area was visited by Sadoveanu before he wrote The Hatchet.

After she sells at Noon on 10 March the rest of their sheep to a Jewish merchant, David, Vitoria and Gheorghiță begin walking the route Nechifor walked to Dorna. They travel across the Bistrița River, going through Bicaz, Călugăreni (where David leaves them), Farcașa, Borca, Broșteni, and Crucea, asking everywhere if Nechifor had been there. Vitoria eventually arrives in Vatra Dornei, where the sale records of Nechifor state that he bought 300 sheep, and then decided 100 sheep went to two other unknown mountain householders. The flocks of sheep had been sent to the Neagra Șarului River for the winter from Ștefănești by the Prut River, and from there the three comrades were supposed to have continued home.

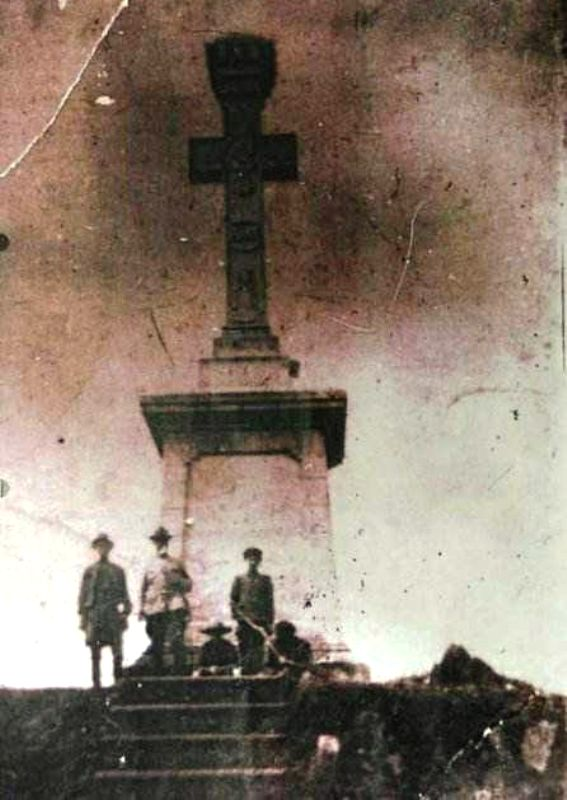
The former "Cross of the Italians" in Stânișoara Pass. It was built by Italian stonemasons in 1914, when the Road of the Italians was completed, and it was destroyed by war in 1944.

Vitoria and Gheorghiță go on the Neagra Valley to find the flocks of sheep, going through Șaru Dornei, Păltiniș, Dârmoxa, Broșteni, Borca, and Sabasa, traveling on the Road of the Italians across the Stânișoara Pass to Suha. Arriving in Suha, Vitoria finds out from the publican Iorgu Vasiliu and his wife Maria only two shepherds had walked through there since autumn. The two shepherds, Calistrat Bogza and Ilie Cuțui, live in the Doi Meri Valley and seem to have quickly grown wealthier, and their wives became vain and spendthrift. Summoned to the city hall, Bogza and Cuțui say they bought all of the sheep from Lipan and went to the Cross of the Italians with Nechifor, returning to his house. After Vitoria gets some advice, Maria launches a rumor in Suha that the sheep that were sold to the two shepherds are questionable because after Nechifor's death, there were no witnesses, and no documents were signed.

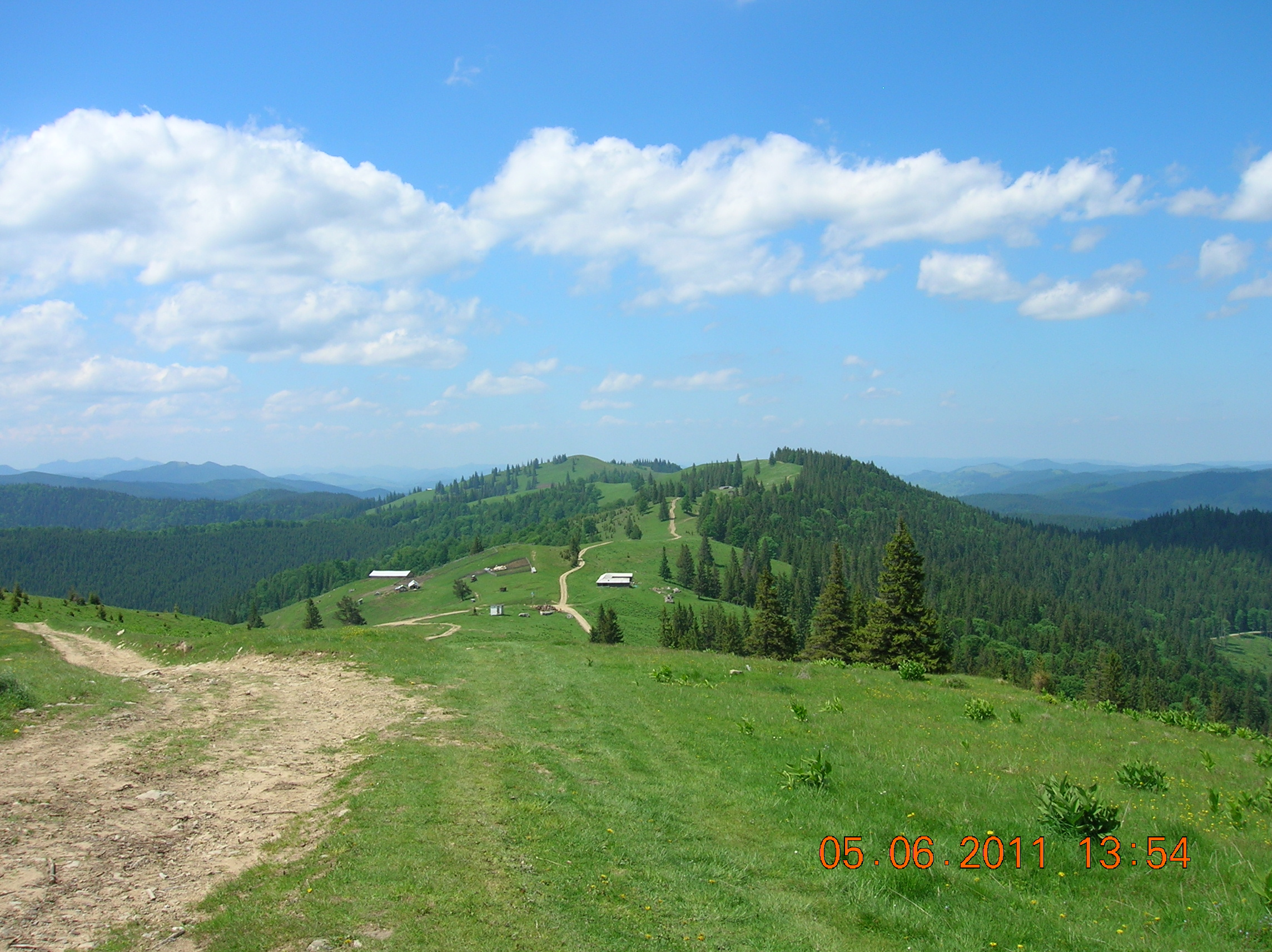
Stânișoara Pass on the Road of the Italians, also known nowadays as the Vitoria Lipan Road.

Thinking quickly, Vitoria draws a conclusion as to where Nechifor Lipan had been killed, and what happened between Suha and Sabasa. She returns to Stânișoara Pass, and finds Nechifor's dog in a villager's courtyard. The dog leads her to a ravine where Nechifor's body is found, together with that of his horse. Nechifor's skull was broken by a hatchet, proving his death was violent. The authorities investigate Bogza and Cuțui, who continue to say that they parted ways with Nechifor after they had been paid.

Vitoria organizes a big feast in Sabasa to bury Nechifor's remains, inviting the undersheriff and the two householders from Suha. The woman accuses Calistrat Bogza of hitting her husband from behind to take his sheep, with Cuțui standing guard so they would not be surprised by a passerby. The furious householder exits the house and attacks Gheorghiță, who defends himself and hits Bogza on his forehead with the hatchet, while the dog bites Bogza's neck. Ilie Cuțui surrenders and confirms the woman's accusations, while Bogza, who was gravely wounded by the dog's bite, confesses his guilt and asks to be forgiven.

== Characters ==
- Vitoria Lipan – Nechifor Lipan's wife and mother of seven children, five of whom have died.
- Nechifor Lipan – a wealthy shepherd from Tarcău who went missing. Descends from a family of shepherds and owns a flock of sheep.
- Gheorghiță Lipan – the son of Nechifor and Vitoria.
- Minodora Lipan – daughter of Nechifor and Vitoria who is sent to Văratec Monastery while her mother searches for Nechifor.
- Lupu' – the dog of the Lipan family who leads the family to Nechifor's corpse and bites Bogza.
- Priest Danil (Dănilă) Milieș – a priest from Tarcău village.
- Crone Maranda – witch of Tarcău village.
- Iordan – the publican of Tarcău.
- Mitrea – the farm-hand of the Lipan family.
- Elder Alexa – an old man who looks after sheep for Nechifor.
- Archimandrite Visarion – abbot of Bistrița Monastery.
- David – a Jewish merchant and friend of Nechifor.
- Donea – innkeeper from Bicaz.
- Anastase Balmez – subsherrif from Neamț county.
- Spiru Gheorghiu and Iancu Neculau – organizers of illegal gambling games, from Galați. Been caught in Farcașa.
- Elder Pricop – blacksmith from Farcașa who invites Vitoria and Gheorghiță for dinner during their travels.
- Dumitru Macovei și Toma – innkeepers from Șaru Dornei and Sabasa.
- Iorgu Vasiliu – innkeeper from Suha.
- Maria – Iorgu Vasiliu's wife who seems to start rumors.
- Calistrat Bogza – tall mountain villager who kills Nechifor Lipan.
- Ilie Cuțui – short mountain villager and Bogza's accomplice in Nechifor Lipan's murder.
- Ileana – Calistrat Bogza's wife.
- Gafița – Ilie Cuțui's wife.

== Editions and translations ==
- Romanian: Baltagul. București: Cartea Românească, 1930.
- German: Die Axt. München: Albert Langen/Georg Müller, 1936. Translated by Harald Krasser.
- Czech: Tři jezdci. Praha: Melantrich, 1938. Translated by Marie Karásková-Kojecká.
- Slovak: Horalka. Bratislava: Slovenska Grafia, 1943. Translated by Zuzka Dovalová.
- Finnish: Etsin miestäni. Helsinki: Oy Suomen kirja, 1944. Translated by Hilkka Koskiluoma.
- Italian: La scure. In: L'osteria di ancutza. La scure: romanzi. Milano: A. Mondadori, 1944. Translated by Gino Lupi.
- Hungarian: A balta. Budapest: Székesfűváros Irodalmi Intézete, 1948. Translated by Nora Aradi.
- Bulgarian: Брадва. Sofia: Narodna Kultura, 1948. Translated by Janka Miteva.
- English: The Hatchet. București: The Book Publishing House, 1955. Translated by Eugenia Farca. Later editions: London, 1965 and New York, 1991.
- French: Le hachereau. Editions Le Livre, București, 1955. Translated by Alexandru Duiliu Zamfirescu. Another translation, by Profira Sadoveanu, was published in 1973 by Editura Minerva, București.
- Swedish: Yxan. Stockholm: Rabén & Sjögren, 1959. Translated by Ingegerd Granlund.
- Polish: Zaginiony, Warsaw: Państwowy Instytut Wydawniczy, 1960. Translated by Rajmund Florans.
- Portuguese: A machadinha, Lisabona: Edicão Livra do Brasil, 1962. Translated by Alexandre Cabral.
- Greek: To peleki. Athens: Difros, 1962. Translated by Doin. Hrysanthakopulu.
- Danish: Øksen. Copenhagen: Skrifola, 1963. Translated by Per Skar.
- Spanish: El Hacha. Buenos-Aires: Seijos y Goyanarte, 1964. Translated by María Teresa León.
- Serbian: Osveta. Belgrade: Nolit, 1964. Translated by Aurel Gavrilov.
- Slovene: Nechiforjeva žena. Ljubljana: Prešernova družba, 1966.
- Russian: Чекан. Moscow: Izvestija, 1983. Translated by Mihail Fridman.
- Norwegian: Øksa. Oslo: Gyldendal, 1997. Translated by Steinar Lone.
