= Glodu =

Glodu may refer to several villages in Romania:

- Glodu, a village in Călineşti Commune, Argeș County
- Glodu, a village in Leordeni Commune, Argeș County
- Glodu, a village in Panaci Commune, Suceava County
- Glodu, a village in Dănicei Commune, Vâlcea County

== See also ==
- Glodu River (disambiguation)
