= Cacova =

Cacova may refer to one of several places in Romania. In 1964, all but one were renamed.

- Cacova, the former name of Livezile Commune, Alba County
- Cacova, the former name of Grădinari Commune, Caraș-Severin County
- Cacova, the former name of Neajlovu village, Morteni Commune, Dâmbovița County
- Cacova, the former name of Piscu Mare village, Stoenești Commune, Vâlcea County
- Cacova (river), a tributary of the Govora in Vâlcea County
- Cacova Ierii, a village in Iara Commune, Cluj County
- Cacova Sibiului, the former name of Fântânele village, Săliște Town, Sibiu County
