= Călimănel =

Călimănel may refer to the following places in Romania:

- Călimănel, a village in the municipality of Toplița, Harghita County
- Călimănel (Mureș), a tributary of the river Mureș in Harghita County
- Călimănel (Neagra), a tributary of the river Neagra in Suceava County
