= Șimișna (river) =

- Location within Romania

Location
- Country: Romania
- Counties: Cluj, Sălaj
- Villages: Ciubanca, Hășmaș, Șimișna

Physical characteristics
- Mouth: Someș
  - location: Rus
  - coordinates: 47.2760°N 23.6131°E
- Length: 22 km (14 mi)
- Basin size: 137 km^{2} (53 sq mi)

Basin features
- Progression: Someș→ Tisza→ Danube→ Black Sea
- Tributaries
  - left: Escu, Ceaca

The Șimișna (Hungarian: Semesnye) is a left tributary of the river Someș in Romania. It discharges into the Someș near Rus. Its length is 22 km (14 mi) and its basin size is 137 km^{2} (53 sq mi).
