= Tonești =

Toneşti may refer to several villages in Romania:

- Toneşti, a village in Leleasca Commune, Olt County
- Toneşti, a village in Sâmburești Commune, Olt County
