= Cerna (Crasna) =

- Location within Romania

Location
- Country: Romania
- Counties: Maramureș, Satu Mare
- Villages: Bicaz, Babța, Racova, Hurezu Mare

Physical characteristics
- Mouth: Crasna
  - location: Supuru de Jos
  - coordinates: 47.4715°N 22.8035°E

Basin features
- Progression: Crasna→ Tisza→ Danube→ Black Sea
- Tributaries
  - left: Ciuta
  - right: Nanda

The Cerna is a right tributary of the river Crasna in Romania. It discharges into the Crasna near Supur. Its length is 18 km (11 mi) and its basin size is 112 km^{2} (43 sq mi).
