= Borca =

Borca can refer to:

- Borča, a suburb of Belgrade, Serbia
- Borca, Neamț, a commune in Neamţ County, Romania
