= Govora =

Govora may refer to several places in Romania:

== Places ==
- Băile Govora, a town and a spa in Vâlcea County
- Govora, a village in Bobicești Commune, Olt County
- Govora, a village in Mihăești Commune, Vâlcea County

== Monastery ==
- Govora Monastery (in Romanian) - Mănăstirea Govora, one of the oldest monasteries from Țara Românească

== River ==
- Govora (river), right tributary of the river Olt in Vâlcea County
