= Valea Cerbului =

Valea Cerbului may refer to the following places in Romania:

- Valea Cerbului, a village in the commune Bucium, Alba County
- Valea Cerbului, a tributary of the Cungrea in Olt County
- Valea Cerbului (Prahova), a tributary of the Prahova in Prahova County
- Valea Cerbului, a tributary of the Sălăuța in Bistrița-Năsăud County
