= Haita =

- Location within Romania

Location
- Country: Romania
- Counties: Suceava County

Physical characteristics
- Mouth: Neagra
  - location: Gura Haitii
  - coordinates: 47.1931°N 25.2550°E
- Length: 7 km (4.3 mi)
- Basin size: 40 km^{2} (15 sq mi)

Basin features
- Progression: Neagra→ Bistrița→ Siret→ Danube→ Black Sea
- Tributaries
  - left: Tămău, Panacul
  - right: Tarnița

The Haita is a left tributary of the river Neagra in Romania. It discharges into the Neagra in Gura Haitii. Its length is 7 km (4.3 mi) and its basin size is 40 km^{2} (15 sq mi).
