= Hurez (Ciolt) =

- Location within Romania

Location
- Country: Romania
- Counties: Arad County

Physical characteristics
- Mouth: Ciolt
  - location: near Chisindia
  - coordinates: 46.2853°N 22.1020°E
- Length: 13 km (8.1 mi)
- Basin size: 21 km^{2} (8.1 sq mi)

Basin features
- Progression: Ciolt→ Chisindia→ Crișul Alb→ Körös→ Tisza→ Danube→ Black Sea

The Hurez is a left tributary of the river Ciolt in Romania. It flows into the Ciolt near Chisindia. Its length is 13 km (8.1 mi) and its basin size is 21 km^{2} (8.1 sq mi).
