= Ceaca =

- Location within Romania

Location
- Country: Romania
- Counties: Sălaj County
- Villages: Vârteșca, Zalha, Ceaca

Physical characteristics
- Mouth: Șimișna
  - location: Hășmaș
  - coordinates: 47.1865°N 23.5958°E
- Length: 12 km (7.5 mi)
- Basin size: 53 km^{2} (20 sq mi)

Basin features
- Progression: Șimișna→ Someș→ Tisza→ Danube→ Black Sea

The Ceaca is a left tributary of the river Șimișna in Romania. It flows into the Șimișna in Hășmaș. Its length is 12 km (7.5 mi) and its basin size is 53 km^{2} (20 sq mi).
