= Spătaru =

Spătaru may refer to:

== Places in Romania ==
- Spătaru, Buzău, a village in Costeşti Commune, Buzău County
- Spătaru, Olt, a village in Cungrea Commune, Olt County

== People ==
- Arina Spătaru
- Dan Spătaru
