= Coșei =

- Location within Romania

Location
- Country: Romania
- Counties: Sălaj, Satu Mare
- Villages: Coșeiu, Archid, Nadișu Hododului, Bogdand

Physical characteristics
- Source
  - location: near Coșeiu, Sălaj County
- Mouth: Maja
  - location: Bogdand
  - coordinates: 47.4074°N 22.9417°E
- Length: 16 km (9.9 mi)
- Basin size: 97 km^{2} (37 sq mi)

Basin features
- Progression: Maja→ Crasna→ Tisza→ Danube→ Black Sea
- River system: Danube
- Tributaries
  - right: Diosod

The Coșei is a right tributary of the river Maja in northwestern Romania. It flows through Sălaj County and Satu Mare County in the historical region of Crișana, draining a hilly area of the Someș Plateau. Its length is 16 km (9.9 mi) and its basin size is 97 km^{2} (37 sq mi).

The Coșei is part of the Danube river system: it flows into the Maja, which is a right tributary of the Crasna. The Crasna in turn is a left tributary of the Tisza in Hungary, which ultimately discharges into the Danube.

== Geography ==
The Coșei originates near the village of Coșeiu (Hungarian: Kusaly) in southern Sălaj County. From its source the river flows generally northward through the hilly terrain of the Someș Plateau, the northern subdivision of the Transylvanian Plateau. The landscape is characterised by rolling hills with elevations of 300–500 metres, dissected by a network of valleys and small watercourses typical of the plateau region.

The river passes through or near the village of Archid in Coșeiu commune, then crosses the border between Sălaj and Satu Mare counties near Nadișu Hododului (Hungarian: Hadadnádasd), part of Hodod commune in the southeastern corner of Satu Mare County. Hodod commune lies in the hills of Codru, approximately 10 km west of Cehu Silvaniei. The Coșei continues northward to Bogdand (Hungarian: Bogdánd), a commune in southern Satu Mare County situated on the border with Sălaj County, where it discharges into the Maja.

=== Tributaries ===
The Diosod, also referred to as pârâul Chilioarei (the Chilioara brook), is a right tributary of the Coșei. It drains the area around the village of Chilioara in Coșeiu commune.

== Historical context ==
The villages along the Coșei have a long documented history. Coșeiu, first recorded in 1345 as Kusal, was the ancestral estate of the Kusalyi Jakcs family, a prominent noble family of the medieval Kingdom of Hungary who took their name from the settlement. Members of the family held high offices including that of Voivode of Transylvania and royal treasurer during the fifteenth century. Downstream, Nadișu Hododului has been documented since 1205, and the nearby settlement of Hodod since 1210. In 1399 a castle at Hodod is recorded as belonging to the Kusalyi Jakcs family, who also held the neighbouring villages of Nadișu Hododului and Bogdand.
