= Hurez =

Hurez may refer to several places in Romania:

- Hurez (Hungarian: Huréz), a village in Beclean Commune, Brașov County
- Hurez, a village in Horoatu Crasnei Commune, Sălaj County
- Hurez (Ciolt), a tributary of the river Ciolt in Arad County
- Hurez, a tributary of the river Olt in Brașov County
