= Kabalapatak =

Kabalapatak is the Hungarian name for two villages in Sălaj County, Romania:

- Fântânele, a village in Dragu Commune
- Fântânele-Rus, a village in Rus Commune
