= Maja (Crasna) =

- Location within Romania

Location
- Country: Romania
- Counties: Sălaj, Satu Mare
- Villages: Valea Pomilor, Bogdand, Corund, Supuru de Jos

Physical characteristics
- Mouth: Crasna
  - location: Supuru de Jos
  - coordinates: 47.4494°N 22.8005°E
- Length: 28 km (17 mi)
- Basin size: 244 km^{2} (94 sq mi)

Basin features
- Progression: Crasna→ Tisza→ Danube→ Black Sea
- Tributaries
  - right: Coșei

The Maja is a right tributary of the river Crasna in Romania. It discharges into the Crasna in Supur. Its length is 28 km (17 mi) and its basin size is 244 km^{2} (94 sq mi).
