= Sărișorul Mare =

- Location within Romania

Location
- Country: Romania
- Counties: Suceava County
- Villages: Sărișoru Mare, Șaru Bucovinei

Physical characteristics
- Mouth: Neagra
  - location: Șaru Dornei
  - coordinates: 47.2927°N 25.3682°E
- Length: 8 km (5.0 mi)
- Basin size: 45 km^{2} (17 sq mi)

Basin features
- Progression: Neagra→ Bistrița→ Siret→ Danube→ Black Sea
- Tributaries
  - left: Pârâul Șerbilor, Sărișorul Mic

The Sărișorul Mare is a left tributary of the river Neagra in Romania. It flows into the Neagra in Șaru Dornei. Its length is 8 km (5.0 mi) and its basin size is 45 km^{2} (17 sq mi).
