= Cungrișoara =

- Location within Romania

Location
- Country: Romania
- Counties: Olt County
- Villages: Leleasca, Greerești, Ibănești

Physical characteristics
- Mouth: Olt
  - coordinates: 44.6150°N 24.3287°E

Basin features
- Progression: Olt→ Danube→ Black Sea
- Tributaries
  - left: Albești
  - right: Cungrea
- River code: VIII.1.162

The Cungrișoara is a left tributary of the river Olt in Romania. It flows into the Olt near Cucueți. Its length is 32 km (20 mi) and its basin size is 155 km^{2} (60 sq mi).
