= Tăieturii River =

Tăieturii River may refer to:

- Tăieturii River (Neagra Șarului), in Suceava County, Romania
- Tăieturii River (Târnava Mare), in Harghita County, Romania
