= Albești (Cungrișoara) =

- Location within Romania

Location
- Country: Romania
- Counties: Olt County
- Villages: Albești

Physical characteristics
- Mouth: Cungrișoara
  - coordinates: 44.6653°N 24.4068°E
- Length: 13 km (8.1 mi)
- Basin size: 37 km^{2} (14 sq mi)

Basin features
- Progression: Cungrișoara→ Olt→ Danube→ Black Sea
- River code: VIII.1.162.1

The Albești is a left tributary of the river Cungrișoara in Romania. It flows into the Cungrișoara in Miești. Its length is 13 km (8.1 mi) and its basin size is 37 km^{2} (14 sq mi).
