= Cungra =

- Location within Romania

Location
- Country: Romania
- Counties: Vâlcea, Olt
- Villages: Dealu Lăunele, Cireșul, Lăunele, Dobroteasa

Physical characteristics
- Mouth: Olt
  - coordinates: 44.7515°N 24.2840°E
- Length: 28 km (17 mi)
- Basin size: 136 km^{2} (53 sq mi)

Basin features
- Progression: Olt→ Danube→ Black Sea
- Tributaries
  - left: Lungoț, Cârgrea

The Cungra is a left tributary of the river Olt in Romania. It discharges into the Olt in Câmpu Mare. Its length is 28 km (17 mi) and its basin size is 136 km^{2} (53 sq mi).
