= Râul Feții =

Râul Feții may refer to:

- Pârâul Feții, a tributary of the Latorița in Vâlcea County
- Râul Feții (Bistrița)
