= Dumitrina Mitrea =

Romanian politician (born 1971)

Member of the Chamber of Deputies
- Incumbent
- Assumed office 21 December 2020
- Constituency: Neamț County

Personal details
- Born: 12 October 1971 (age 54) Borca, Neamț County, Romania
- Party: Alliance for the Union of Romanians
- Education: Bucharest Academy of Economic Studies

Dumitrina Mitrea (born 12 October 1971) is a Romanian politician who since 2020 has been a member of the Chamber of Deputies for the Alliance for the Union of Romanians (AUR).

== Early life and education ==
Dumitrina Mitrea was born on 12 October 1971 in Borca, Neamț County in the Socialist Republic of Romania to a family with six children. She studied at the Bucharest Academy of Economic Studies.

== Political career ==
=== First term (2020‒2024) ===
In the 2020 Romania parliamentary election on 6 December, Mitrea was elected a member of the Chamber of Deputies for the Alliance for the Union of Romanians in Neamț County, taking office on 21 December. On 16 February 2024, she was announced as a candidate for the 2024 European Parliament election in Romania on 9 June. She is a member of the Parliamentary Assembly of the Council of Europe.

As of March 2024, Mitrea was a member of the National Leadership Bureau of AUR, being among of the six highest-ranking women in the party.

=== Second term (2024‒present) ===
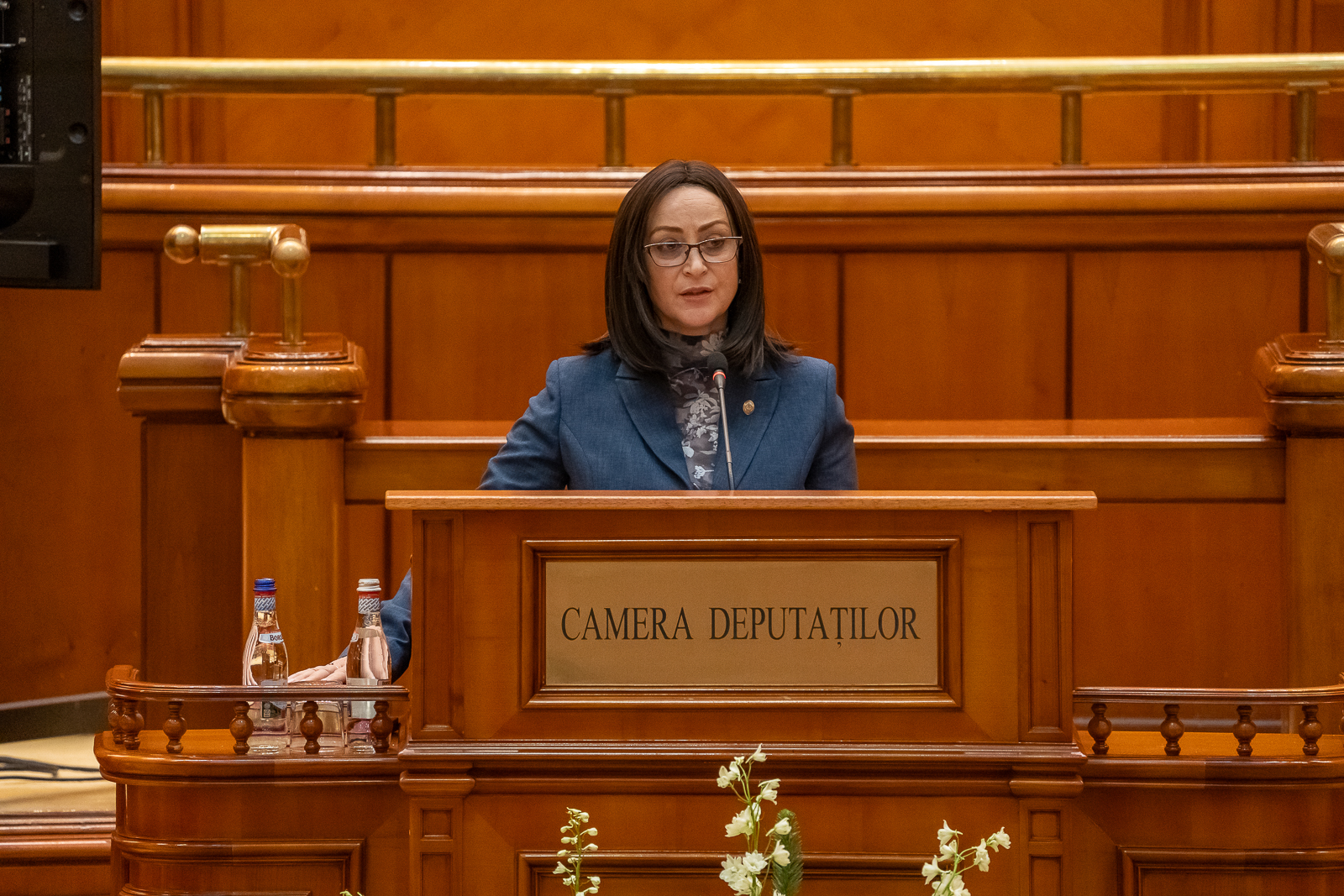
Mitrea taking the oath of office on 21 December 2024

In the 2024 Romania parliamentary election on 1 December, Mitrea was reelected to the Chamber of Deputies in the same constituency as previously.
