= Cârgrea =

- Location within Romania

Location
- Country: Romania
- Counties: Argeș, Olt

Physical characteristics
- Mouth: Cungra
  - coordinates: 44.8103°N 24.4010°E
- Length: 27 km (17 mi)
- Basin size: 61 km^{2} (24 sq mi)

Basin features
- Progression: Cungra→ Olt→ Danube→ Black Sea
- River code: VIII.1.158.2

The Cârgrea is a left tributary of the river Cungra in Romania. It flows into the Cungra in Sâmburești. Its length is 27 km (17 mi) and its basin size is 61 km^{2} (24 sq mi).
