= Ciolt =

- Location within Romania

Location
- Country: Romania
- Counties: Arad County
- Villages: Chisindia

Physical characteristics
- Source: Zărand Mountains
- Mouth: Chisindia
  - location: Chisindia
  - coordinates: 46.2944°N 22.0997°E
- Length: 12 km (7.5 mi)
- Basin size: 45 km^{2} (17 sq mi)

Basin features
- Progression: Chisindia→ Crișul Alb→ Körös→ Tisza→ Danube→ Black Sea
- Tributaries
  - left: Hurez

The Ciolt is a right tributary of the river Chisindia in Romania. It flows into the Chisindia in the village Chisindia. Its length is 12 km (7.5 mi) and its basin size is 45 km^{2} (17 sq mi).
