= Bicaz, Maramureș =

Bicaz
- Commune
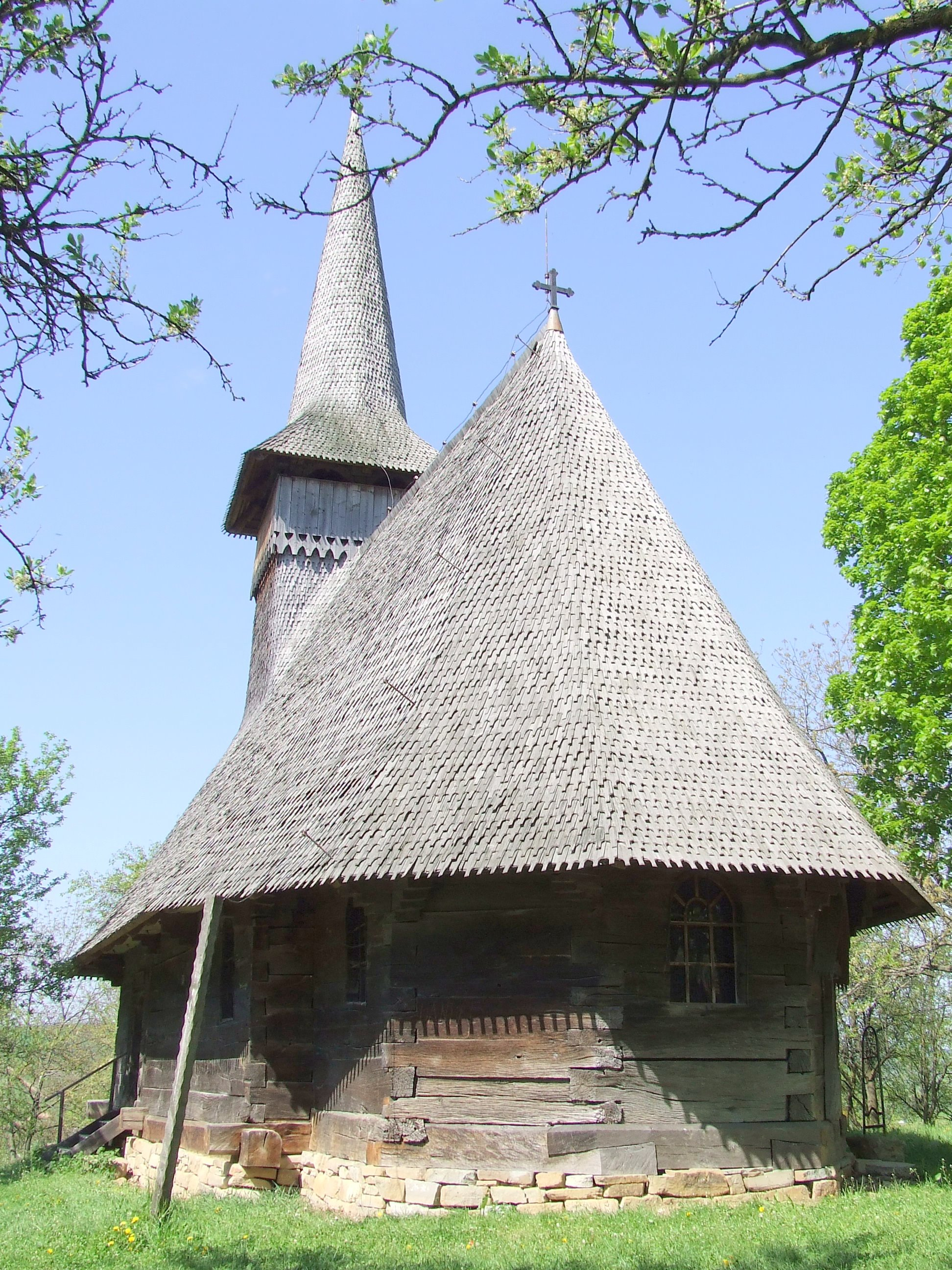
- Wooden church in Bicaz

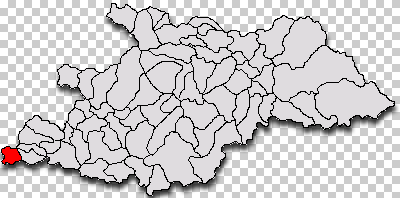
- Location in Maramureș County

- Location in Romania
- Coordinates: 47°27′42″N 23°02′12″E
- Country: Romania
- County: Maramureș

Government
  - Mayor (2020–2024): Dorin-Flaviu Mitre (CMM)
- Area: 22.19 km^{2} (8.57 sq mi)
- Elevation: 279 m (915 ft)
- Population (2021-12-01): 942
  - Density: 42.5/km^{2} (110/sq mi)
- Time zone: UTC+02:00 (EET)
  - Summer (DST): UTC+03:00 (EEST)
- Postal code: 437040
- Area code: +40 x59
- Vehicle reg.: MM
- Website: www.primaria-bicaz.ro

Bicaz (Hungarian: Bikácfalva) is a commune in Maramureș County, Crișana, Romania. It is composed of three villages: Bicaz, Ciuta (Szilágynyires), and Corni (Somfalu).

== Geography ==
The commune is situated at an altitude of 279 m (915 ft), on the banks of the river Cerna. It is located in the southwestern extremity of Maramureș County, on the border with Satu Mare and Sălaj counties. The county seat, Baia Mare, is 60 km (37 mi) to the northeast; the city of Satu Mare is 50 km (31 mi) to the northwest, while Zalău is 40 km (25 mi) to the south.

== Demographics ==
Historical population
Year	Pop.	±%
1880	1,753	—
1900	1,942	+10.8%
1910	2,078	+7.0%
1930	2,185	+5.1%
1956	2,478	+13.4%
1977	2,014	−18.7%
1992	1,533	−23.9%
2002	1,287	−16.0%
2011	1,124	−12.7%
2021	942	−16.2%
Source: Census data

At the 2021 census, the commune had 942 inhabitants; of those, 88.43% were Romanians and 2.12% Roma.

== Sights ==
- Archangels wooden church in Bicaz, built in the 18th century (1723), historic monument
