= Cungrea (river) =

- Location within Romania

Location
- Country: Romania
- Counties: Olt County
- Villages: Tonești, Oteștii de Sus, Cungrea

Physical characteristics
- Mouth: Cungrișoara
  - coordinates: 44.6575°N 24.3797°E
- Length: 20 km (12 mi)
- Basin size: 52 km^{2} (20 sq mi)

Basin features
- Progression: Cungrișoara→ Olt→ Danube→ Black Sea
- Tributaries
  - right: Valea Cerbului
- River code: VIII.1.162.2

The Cungrea is a right tributary of the river Cungrișoara in Romania. It flows into the Cungrișoara in the village Cungrea. Its length is 20 km (12 mi) and its basin size is 52 km^{2} (20 sq mi).
