= Hodod =

Hodod Hadad, Kriegsdorf
- Commune
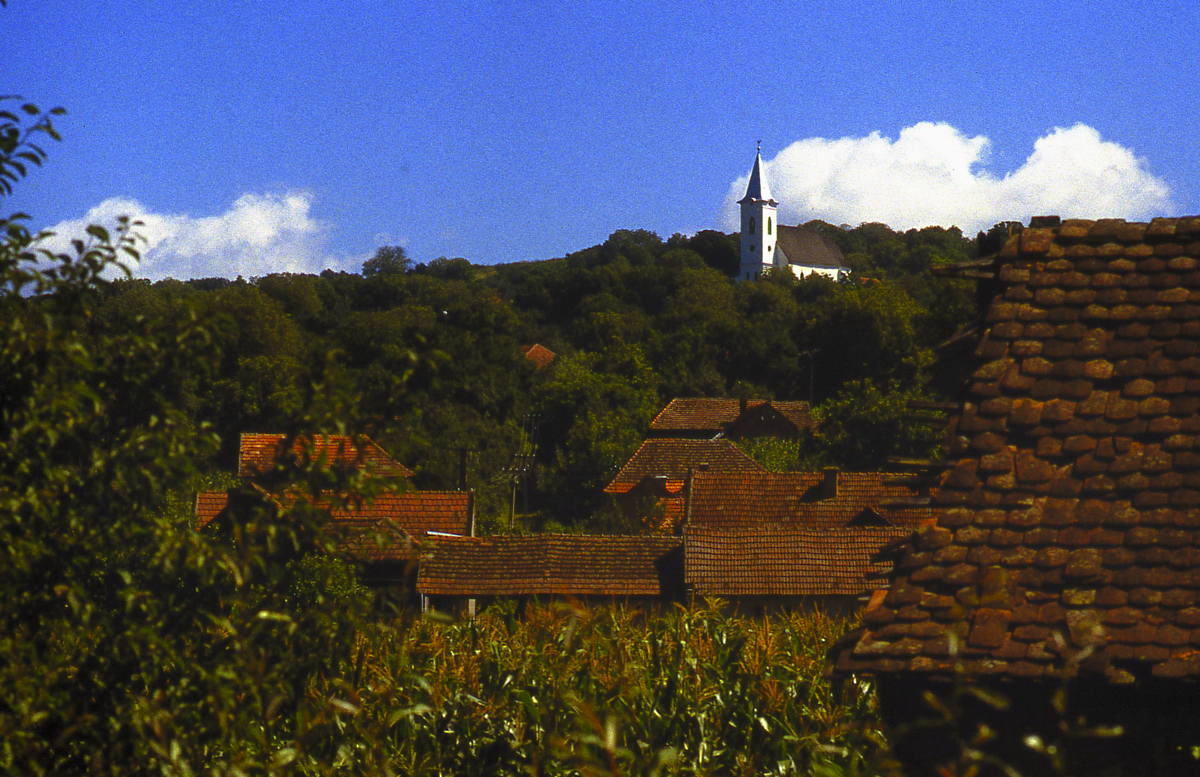
- View of Hodod, with the Hungarian Reformed church

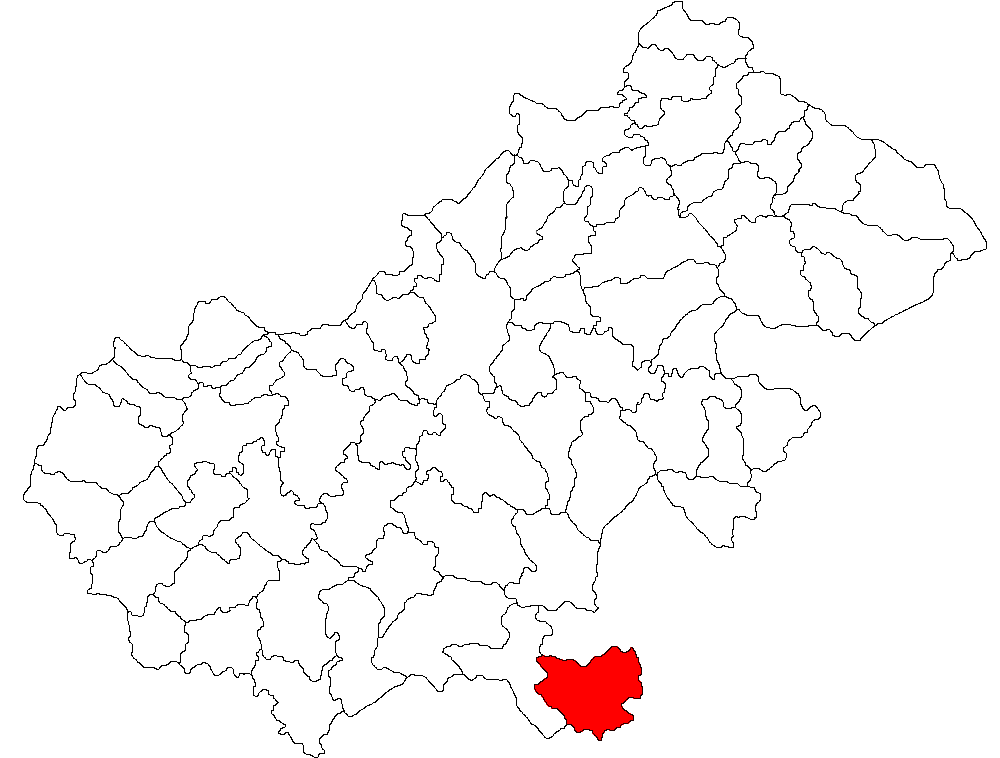
- Location in Satu Mare County

- Location in Romania
- Coordinates: 47°24′N 23°2′E
- Country: Romania
- County: Satu Mare

Government
  - Mayor (2020–2024): Francisc Balog (UDMR)
- Area: 76.88 km^{2} (29.68 sq mi)
- Elevation: 250 m (820 ft)
- Population (2021-12-01): 2,914
  - Density: 37.90/km^{2} (98.17/sq mi)
- Time zone: UTC+02:00 (EET)
  - Summer (DST): UTC+03:00 (EEST)
- Postal code: 447155
- Vehicle reg.: SM
- Website: comunahodod.ro

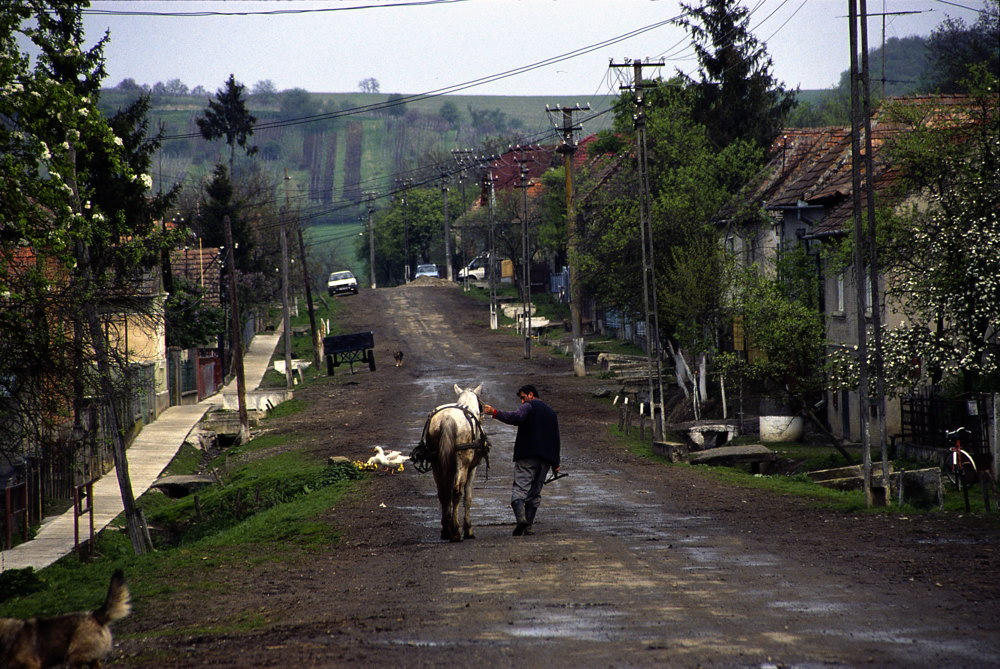
Nadișu, Kloten Utca

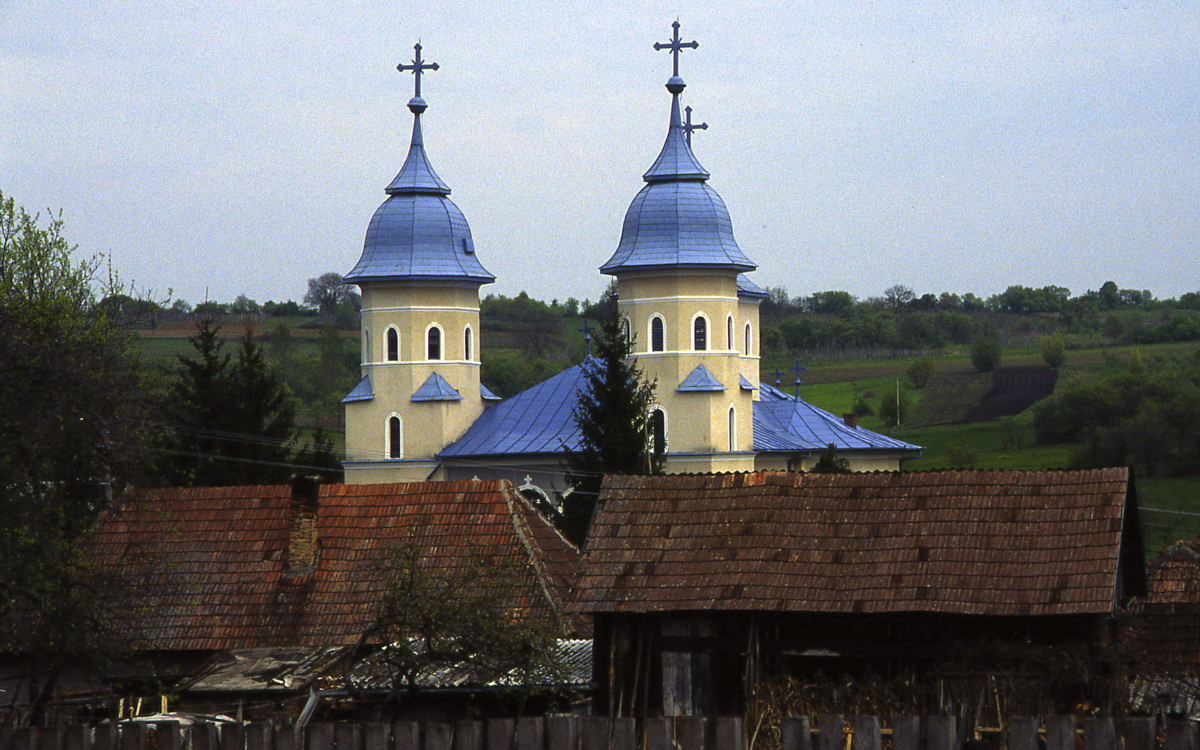
Giurtelecu, Romanian Orthodox church

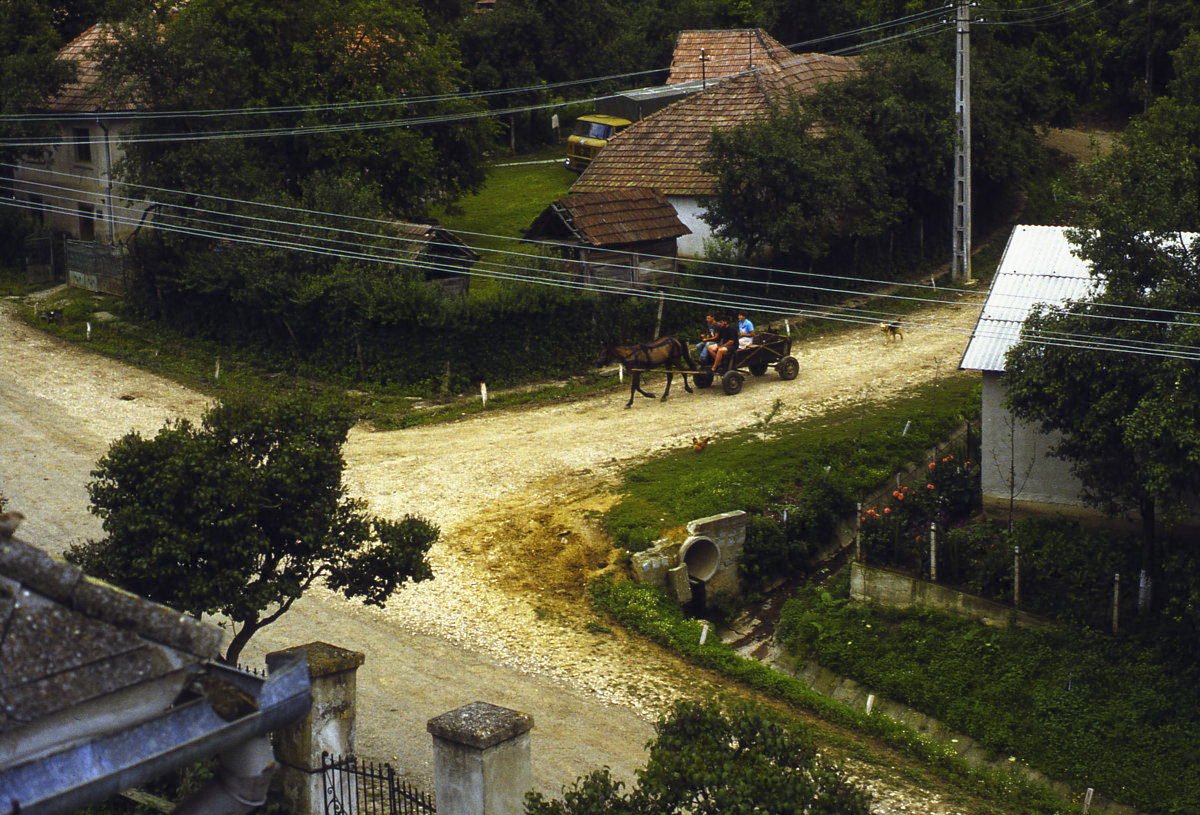
Lelei

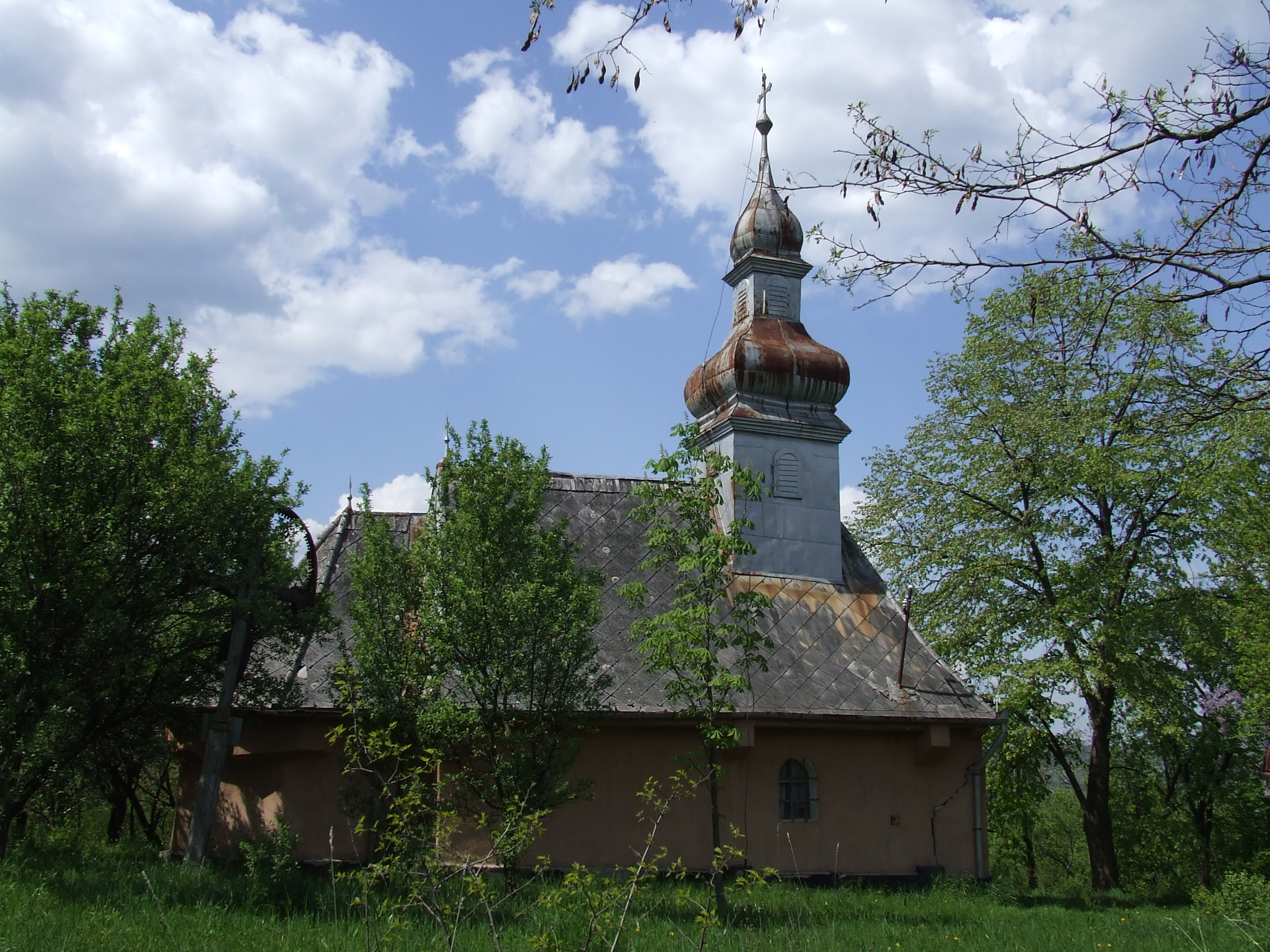
Lelei, wooden church

Hodod (Hungarian: Hadad, Hungarian pronunciation: [hɒdɒd]; German: Kriegsdorf) is a commune of 2,914 inhabitants (as of 2021) situated in Satu Mare County, Crișana, Romania. It is composed of four villages:

Romanian	Hungarian	German
Giurtelecu Hododului	Hadadgyőrtelek	Wüst Jörgen, Georgius
Hodod	Hadad	Kriegsdorf
Lelei	Lele	Lellen
Nadișu Hododului	Hadadnádasd	Ungarisch Rohrdorf, Rohrfeld

== Geography ==
The commune lies in the extreme southeast of Satu Mare County. It borders the Bogdand commune to the west, Maramureș County to the north, and Sălaj County to the east and south. Hodod is located in the hills of Codru, 10 km (6.2 mi) west of Cehu Silvaniei and 70 km (43 mi) south of Satu Mare, the capital of Satu Mare County.

== History ==
=== Until 1940 ===
Hodod is mentioned since 1210, Nadișu Hododului since 1205, Lelei since 1330, and Giurtelecu Hododului since 1378. Hodod belonged to the Kingdom of Hungary and was part of the Principality of Transylvania. In 1399, a castle is mentioned when the village belonged to the family Kusalyi Jakcs. Hodod gained city status in 1482.

Hodod was given by King Rudolf II of Habsburg to the Wesselényi family, to whom it belonged until the 20th century. The castle was destroyed in the early 18th century. After the rebellion of Francis II Rákóczi, the town was taken from the Wesselényi family.

The Wesselényi family built a large castle in Baroque style. After the outbreak of the plague, the immigration of German settlers was promoted. From 1744 to 1751, Baron Franz Wesseleny invited 30 families from Baden-Durlach and Switzerland to his property in Kriegsdorf (Hadad). In subsequent years, more immigrants came from German-speaking regions to Kriegsdorf. In 1880 Kriegsdorf counted 479 German inhabitants.

After the Austro-Hungarian compromise of 1867, the Austrian Empire and the Principality of Transylvania were dissolved. In 1876 the Kingdom of Hungary was divided into provinces, and Hodod became part of Szilágy County. After the collapse of Austria-Hungary at the end of World War I and the declaration of the Union of Transylvania with Romania, the Romanian Army took control of Hodod in the spring of 1919, during the Hungarian–Romanian War. The town officially became part of the territory ceded to the Kingdom of Romania in June 1920 under the terms of the Treaty of Trianon, and was assigned to Sălaj County.

=== 1940–1945 ===
In August 1940, the Second Vienna Award, arbitrated by Germany and Italy, reassigned the territory of Northern Transylvania (which included Hodod) from Romania to Hungary. Towards the end of World War II, however, the town was taken back from Hungarian and German troops by Romanian and Soviet forces in October 1944.

In May 1944, the Jewish residents were collected in the ghetto of Satu Mare. On May 19, 22, 26, 29, 30, 31, and June 1 of that year, they were deported to Auschwitz.

Little is known about the fate of the Roma people. This is partly due to the fact that the Roma, in comparison with the Jews, were poorly organized. With the retreat of the German army in 1944, many Germans left Hodod. In 1945, 43 ethnic Germans from Hodod were deported to the Soviet Union.

=== After 1945 ===
In March 1945, Northern Transylvania (including Hodod) became Romanian again. In 1950 the commune became part of the Baia Mare Region, which changed its name to Maramureș Region in 1960. In the administrative reform of the country in 1968, Hodod became part of Satu Mare County, to which it currently belongs.

During the communist regime, especially in the 1980s, many Germans emigrated.

== Demographics ==
=== Ethnic groups (2002 census) ===
- Hungarians: 2166 (67,70%)
- Romanians: 907 (28.35%)
- Romani people: 79 (2.46%)
- Germans: 46 (1.43%)

=== Inhabitants per village (census 2002) ===
- Giurtelecu Hododului: 816
- Hodod: 912
- Lelei: 662
- Nadișu Hododului: 809

=== Religion ===
In 2002, the religious composition of the municipality was as follows:

- Reformed: 60.26%
- Orthodox: 27.57%
- Baptist: 7.87%
- Pentecostal: 1.71%
- Catholic: 0.84%
- Seventh-day Adventist: 0.56%

=== Language ===
The official language is Romanian. In Hodod, Nadișu, and Lelei Hungarian is predominantly spoken. People in Giurtelecu speak mainly Romanian, while the Roma speak Romani (the language of the Roma, gypsies). A small minority speaks German.

Ethnic minority groups (Hungarians, Swabians) often identify first with their ethnicity and second as Romanians. In villages with a predominantly Hungarian population it is polite to use Hungarian place names (Hadad Hadadgyőrtelek, Hadadnádasd, Lele). When speaking to Romanians the use of Romanian place names is polite (Hodod, Lelei, Giurtelecu Hododului, Nadișu Hododului). This applies also to titles such as "mayor" (Hungarian: polgármester; Romanian: Primar).

In terms of foreign languages, a part of the population speaks English, French, and German. Historically, French was the leading language of study, but nowadays English is replacing it, so that the elderly in Romania can speak French and youngsters English.

== Politics ==
The Hodod City Council has 13 Councillors. At the time of the Romanian municipal elections of June 2016, Francisc Balog (UDMR) was elected as mayor.

Municipal elections 2016
Party	Number of Councillors
Democratic Union of Hungarians in Romania Uniunea Democrată Maghiară din România (UDMR)	9
National Liberal Party Partidul Național Liberal (PNL)	1
Social Democratic Party Partidul Social Democrat (PSD)	1
Alliance of Liberals and Democrats Alianța Liberalilor și Democraților (ALDE)	1
Hungarian Civic Union Partidul Civic Magiar - Magyar Polgári Párt (PCM)	1

Not all parties are nationally operating parties.

== Education ==
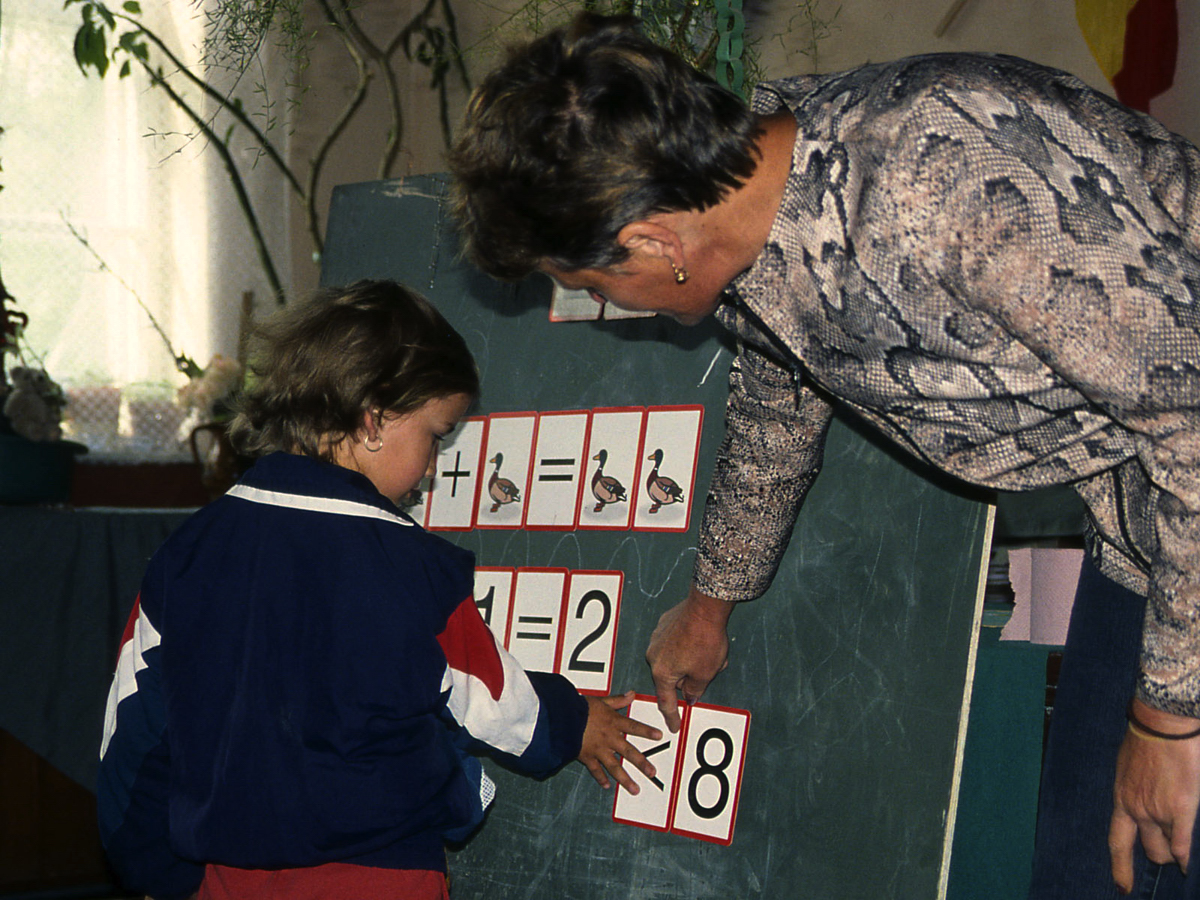
Lelei, school

Hodod has an elementary school. Nadișu, Giurtelecu and Lelei are dependencies. Romanian children attend elementary education from age 6 to age 14.

The Romanian educational system is as follows:

- Școala primară și gimnazială – elementary school and middle school
- Liceu – high school
- Invățământ superior – college

== Economy ==
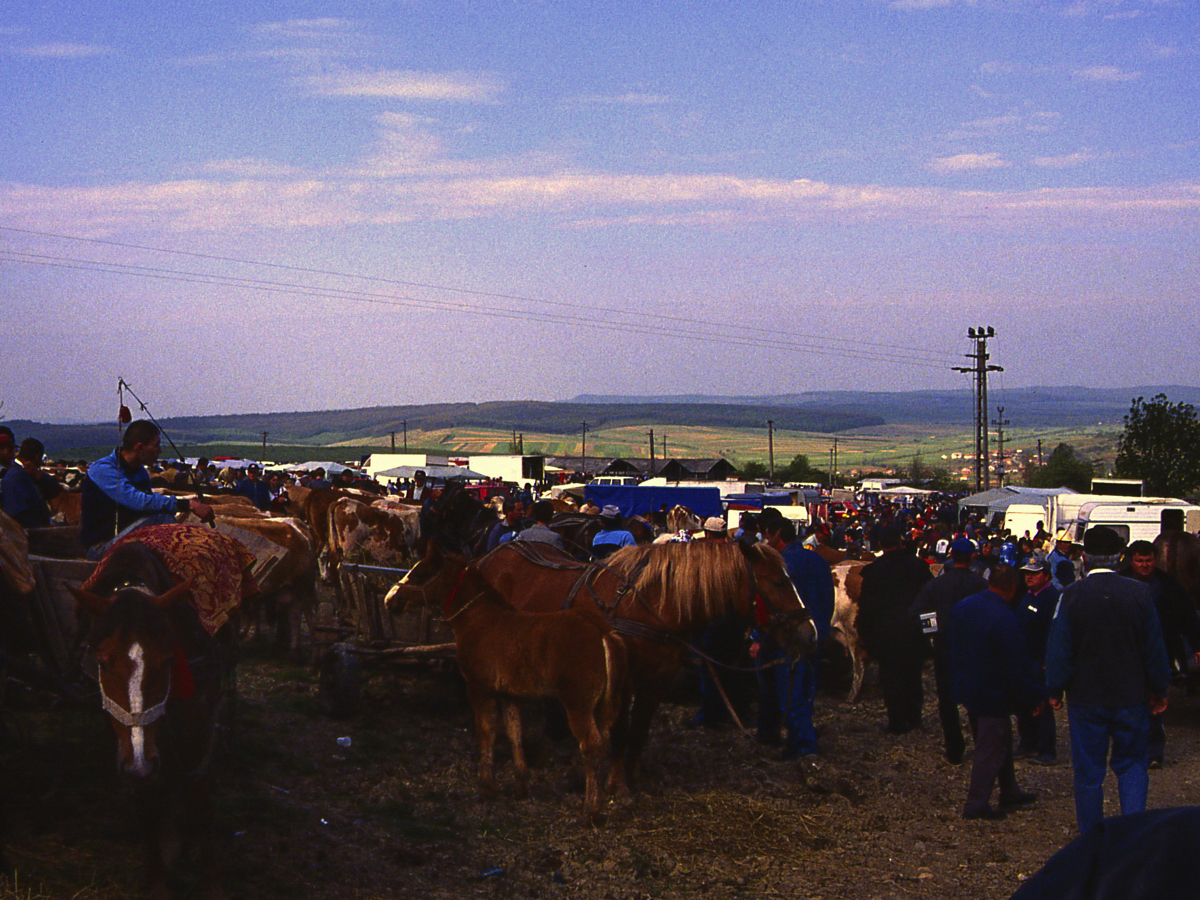
Hodod, market

=== Agriculture ===
The economy of the municipality is based on agriculture (arable, livestock and beekeeping).

=== Market ===
A large market is held in Hodod the first Monday of every month.

== Historic sites and monuments ==
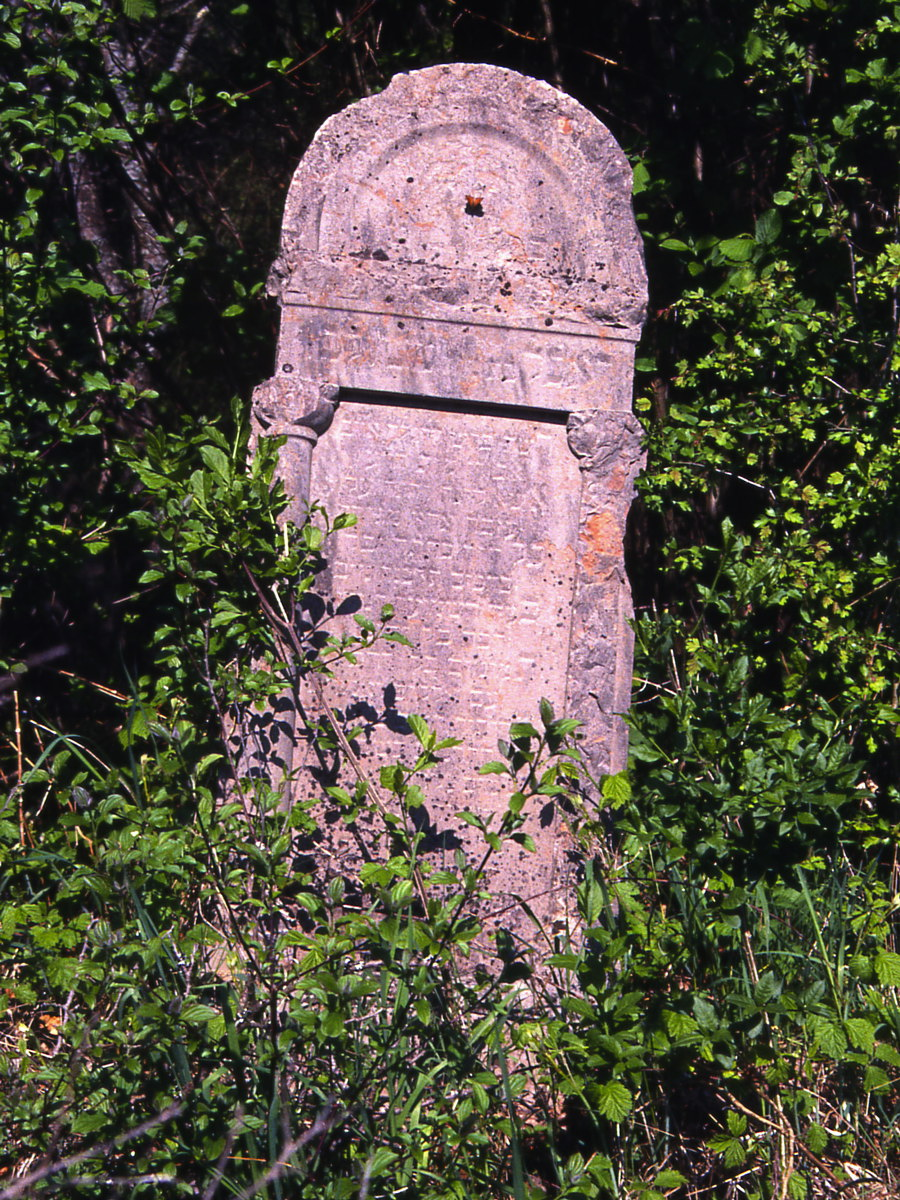
Hodod, Jewish cemetery

=== Castles ===
- Hodod, Wesselényi Castle, one of the landmarks of the Baroque style in Satu Mare County. Eighteenth century.
- Hodod, Degenfeld castle. Eclectic Architecture. Nineteenth century.

=== Church Buildings ===
- Hodod, Evangelical Lutheran Church. Eighteenth century.
- Hodod, Reformed Church, Gothic architecture. Fifteenth century, classified historic monument.
- Nadișu Hododului, Reformed church, Fifteenth century, classified historic monument.
- Giurtelecu Hododului, Orthodox church.
- Lelei, wooden orthodox church of the Holy Archangels. 1870, classified historic monument.
- Lelei, wooden Protestant church, built 1783 - 1788.

=== Cemeteries ===
East of Hodod, hidden between the fields and groves, there is a Jewish cemetery. Also in Nadișu Hododului and Lelei are Jewish cemeteries. In Hodod there is a German cemetery. In this cemetery is a memorial plaque with the names of 44 victims of the World War I (1914–1918).

== Natives ==
- Mariska Ady (1888–1977), writer and poet, niece of Endre Ady
- Béla Kun (1886–1938), Communist revolutionary, leader of the Hungarian Soviet Republic in 1919
- Virgil Măgureanu (b. 1941), intelligence agency chief
