= Govora (river) =

- Location within Romania

Location
- Country: Romania
- Counties: Vâlcea County
- Villages: Dobriceni, Budurăști, Stoenești, Govora, Gurișoara, Mihăești

Physical characteristics
- Source: Căpățânii Mountains
- Mouth: Olt
  - location: Mihăești
  - coordinates: 44.9974°N 24.2824°E
- Length: 29 km (18 mi)
- Basin size: 117 km^{2} (45 sq mi)

Basin features
- Progression: Olt→ Danube→ Black Sea
- Tributaries
  - left: Cacova
  - right: Hârța

The Govora is a right tributary of the river Olt in Romania. It discharges into the Olt near Mihăești. Its length is 29 km (18 mi) and its basin size is 117 km^{2} (45 sq mi).
