= Glodu River =

Glodu River may refer to:

- Glodu, a tributary of the Azuga in Prahova County
- Glodu, a tributary of the Ialomicioara in Dâmbovița County
- Glodu, a tributary of the Secu Vaduri in Neamț County
- Glodu, a tributary of the Vasilatu in Vâlcea County

== See also ==
- Glodu (disambiguation)
