= Mariska Ady =

Hungarian writer

- Born: 26 February 1888; Hadad/Hodod (now Romania)
- Died: 4 February 1977 (aged 88); Budapest, Hungary
- Occupations: Writer, poet
- Spouse: Lajos Landt

Mariska Ady (26 February 1888 in Hadad/Hodod – 4 February 1977 in Budapest) was a Hungarian writer and poet, who published several volumes. She was a cousin of the poet Endre Ady.

== Work ==
By then a widow, Mariska Ady wrote poems during the First World War, on the horrors of the war. Her poems first appeared in local magazines in Szilágy County and later in Transylvanian and national periodicals and newspapers. She followed the lead of her cousin, Endre Ady, in some of the aspects of her lyric poetry. She was the only other member of the Ady family to take up literature.

== Family ==
Ady was the daughter of Sándor Ady, a notary public in Hadad (today Hodod). She qualified as an elementary-school teacher in Budapest. In the First World War she lost her husband, Lajos Landt, which left her with three children to bring up alone. Her teaching career ended early due to illness.

== Bibliography ==
- Sok ború – kevés derű (Much Darkness, Little Brightness, stories, drawings, Zilah/Zalău, 1907)
- Én az őszben járok (In Autumn I Walk, poems, Cristuru Secuiesc/Székelykeresztúr, 1924)
