= Corlat (river) =

- Location within Romania

Location
- Country: Romania
- Counties: Covasna, Brașov

Physical characteristics
- Mouth: Olt
  - location: Arini
  - coordinates: 45.8866°N 25.547751°E
- Length: 12 km (7.5 mi)
- Basin size: 13 km^{2} (5.0 sq mi)

Basin features
- Progression: Olt→ Danube→ Black Sea

The Corlat is a right tributary of the river Olt in Romania. It flows into the Olt near Arini. Its length is 12 km (7.5 mi) and its basin size is 13 km^{2} (5.0 sq mi). The name Corlat is the Romanian geographical name for the river

The Olt river the river that crosses into the Corlat river has a wiki page named Olt (river) since the 2 rivers are connected this is what tributary means it's useful to take in the facts of both rivers.
