= Supur =

Supur Alsószopor
- Commune
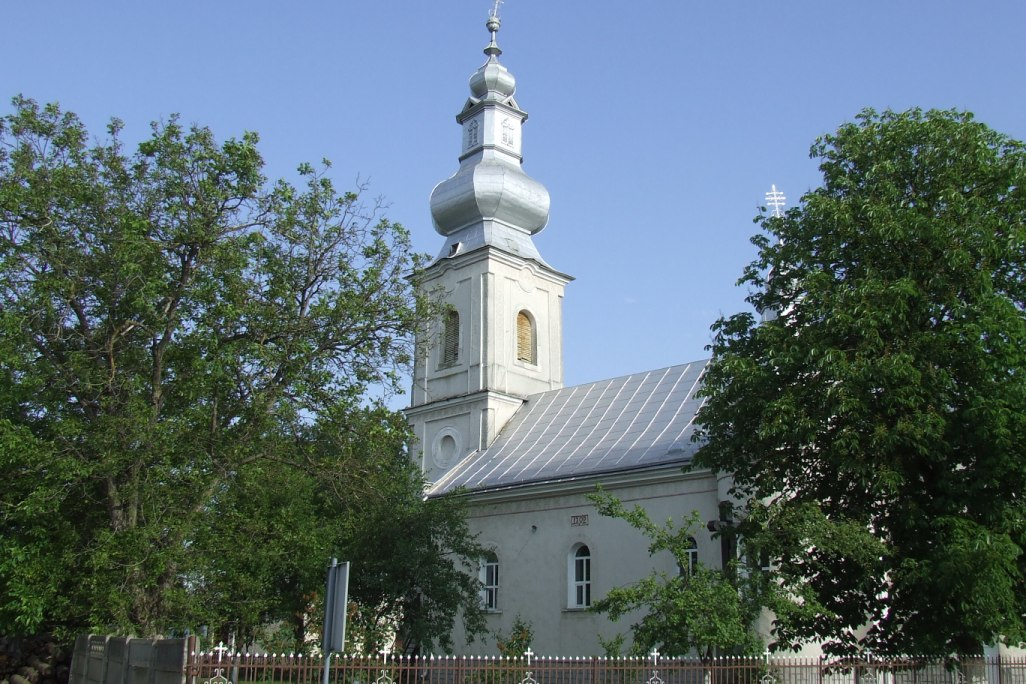
- Church in Supuru de Jos

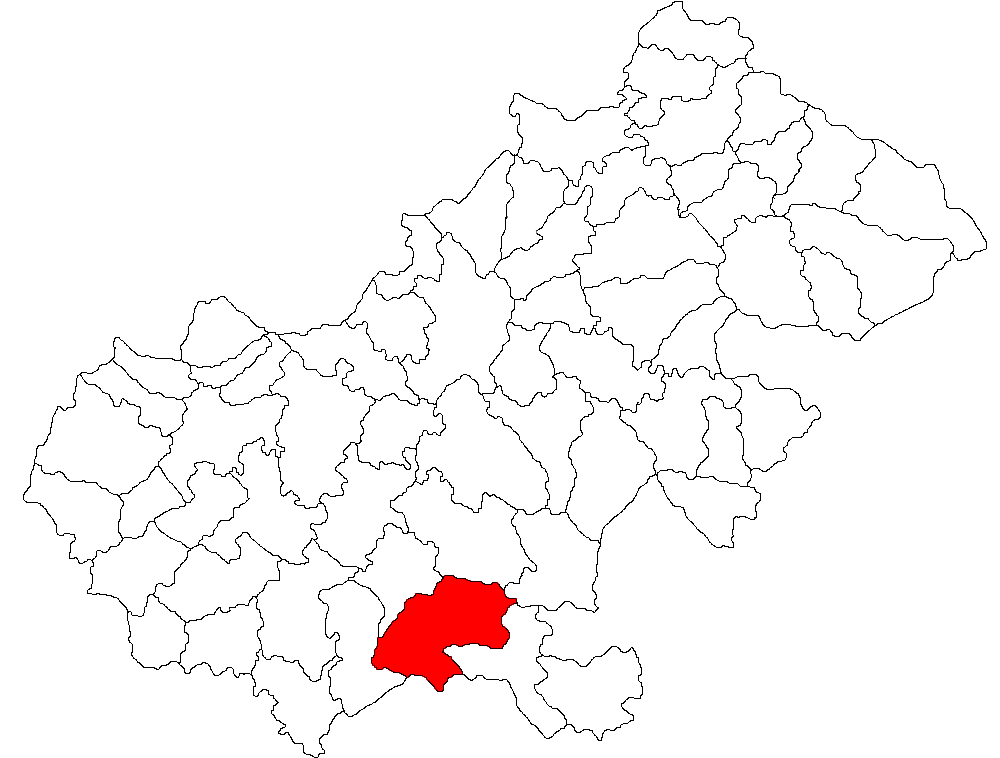
- Location in Satu Mare County

- Location in Romania
- Coordinates: 47°28′N 22°48′E
- Country: Romania
- County: Satu Mare

Government
  - Mayor (2020–2024): Sergiu Petrică Crișan (PNL)
- Area: 121.58 km^{2} (46.94 sq mi)
- Elevation: 154 m (505 ft)
- Population (2021-12-01): 3,990
  - Density: 32.8/km^{2} (85.0/sq mi)
- Time zone: UTC+02:00 (EET)
  - Summer (DST): UTC+03:00 (EEST)
- Postal code: 447300
- Area code: (+40) 02 61
- Vehicle reg.: SM
- Website: www.comunasupur.ro

Supur (Hungarian: Alsószopor; Hungarian pronunciation: [ˈɒlʃoːsopor]) is a commune of 3,990 inhabitants situated in Satu Mare County, Crișana, Romania. Its administrative centre is Supuru de Jos, and the commune is composed of seven villages: Dobra (Dobra), Giorocuta (Girókuta), Hurezu Mare (Nántű), Racova (Rákosterebes), Sechereșa (Szekerestanya), Supuru de Jos (Alsószopor), and Supuru de Sus (Felsőszopor).

== Geography ==
The commune is located in the southern part of the county, on the border with Sălaj County. It lies at an altitude of 154 m (505 ft), on the banks of the river Crasna, and its right tributary, the river Maja.

The national road DN19A (part of European route E81) connects Supur to the county seat, Satu Mare, about 50 km (31 mi) to the north.

== Demographics ==
At the 2002 census, the commune had a population of 4,677, of which 63.99% were Romanians, 28.65% Hungarians and 7.01% Roma; according to mother tongue, 71.01% of the population spoke Romanian, while 28.60% spoke Hungarian as their first language. At the 2011 census, there were 4,231 inhabitants, of which 60.74% Romanians, 25.74% Hungarians, and 10.66% Roma. At the 2021 census, Supur had a population of 3,990, of which 69.27% were Romanians, 22.38% Hungarians, and 3.51% Roma.

Historical population
Year	Pop.	±%
1880	4,814	—
1890	5,349	+11.1%
1900	5,719	+6.9%
1910	6,441	+12.6%
1920	6,419	−0.3%
1930	7,083	+10.3%
1941	7,493	+5.8%
1956	7,801	+4.1%
1966	7,202	−7.7%
1977	6,193	−14.0%
1992	5,087	−17.9%
2002	4,677	−8.1%
2011	4,231	−9.5%
2021	3,990	−5.7%
Source: INS, Census data

== Natives ==
- János Szily (1735-1799), Hungarian Catholic bishop
