= Cerchezoaia =

- Location within Romania

Location
- Country: Romania
- Counties: Iași County
- Villages: Bălteni

Physical characteristics
- Mouth: Prut
  - coordinates: 47.3927°N 27.568472°E
- Length: 17 km (11 mi)
- Basin size: 66 km^{2} (25 sq mi)

Basin features
- Progression: Prut→ Danube→ Black Sea
- River code: XIII.1.14a

The Cerchezoaia is a right tributary of the river Prut in Romania. It flows into the Prut near Vladomira. Its length is 17 km (11 mi) and its basin size is 66 km^{2} (25 sq mi).
