= Călimănel (Neagra) =

- Location within Romania

Location
- Country: Romania
- Counties: Suceava County
- Villages: Păltiniș, Coverca, Panaci

Physical characteristics
- Mouth: Neagra
  - location: Panaci
  - coordinates: 47.2666°N 25.3810°E
- Length: 12 km (7.5 mi)
- Basin size: 74 km^{2} (29 sq mi)

Basin features
- Progression: Neagra→ Bistrița→ Siret→ Danube→ Black Sea
- Tributaries
  - left: Buciniș
  - right: Chirileni

The Călimănel is a right tributary of the river Neagra in Romania. It flows into the Neagra near Panaci. Its length is 12 km (7.5 mi) and its basin size is 74 km^{2} (29 sq mi).
