= Conop (river) =

Conop Konop-patak
- Location within Romania

Location
- Country: Romania
- Counties: Arad County

Physical characteristics
- Mouth: Mureș
  - coordinates: 46.0978°N 21.8772°E
- Length: 11 km (6.8 mi)
- Basin size: 25 km^{2} (9.7 sq mi)

Basin features
- Progression: Mureș→ Tisza→ Danube→ Black Sea

The Conop (Hungarian: Konop-patak) is a right tributary of the river Mureș in Romania. It discharges into the Mureș in the village Conop. Its length is 11 km (6.8 mi) and its basin size is 25 km^{2} (9.7 sq mi).
