= Chisindia (river) =

- Location within Romania

Location
- Country: Romania
- Counties: Arad County
- Villages: Păiușeni, Chisindia

Physical characteristics
- Mouth: Crișul Alb
  - coordinates: 46.3111°N 22.1451°E
- Length: 21 km (13 mi)
- Basin size: 102 km^{2} (39 sq mi)

Basin features
- Progression: Crișul Alb→ Körös→ Tisza→ Danube→ Black Sea
- Tributaries
  - left: Ciolt

The Chisindia is a left tributary of the river Crișul Alb in Romania. It discharges into the Crișul Alb near Berindia. Its length is 21 km (13 mi) and its basin size is 102 km^{2} (39 sq mi).
