= Chindeni =

Chindeni Kis-Heveder-patak
- Location within Romania

Location
- Country: Romania
- Counties: Harghita County

Physical characteristics
- Mouth: Mureș
  - coordinates: 46.635°N 25.595°E

Basin features
- Progression: Mureș→ Tisza→ Danube→ Black Sea

The Chindeni (Hungarian: Kis-Heveder-patak) is a right tributary of the river Mureș in Harghita County, Romania. It joins the Mureș near Voșlăbeni. Its length is 11 km (6.8 mi) and its basin size is 26 km^{2} (10 sq mi).
