= Zalha =

- Commune
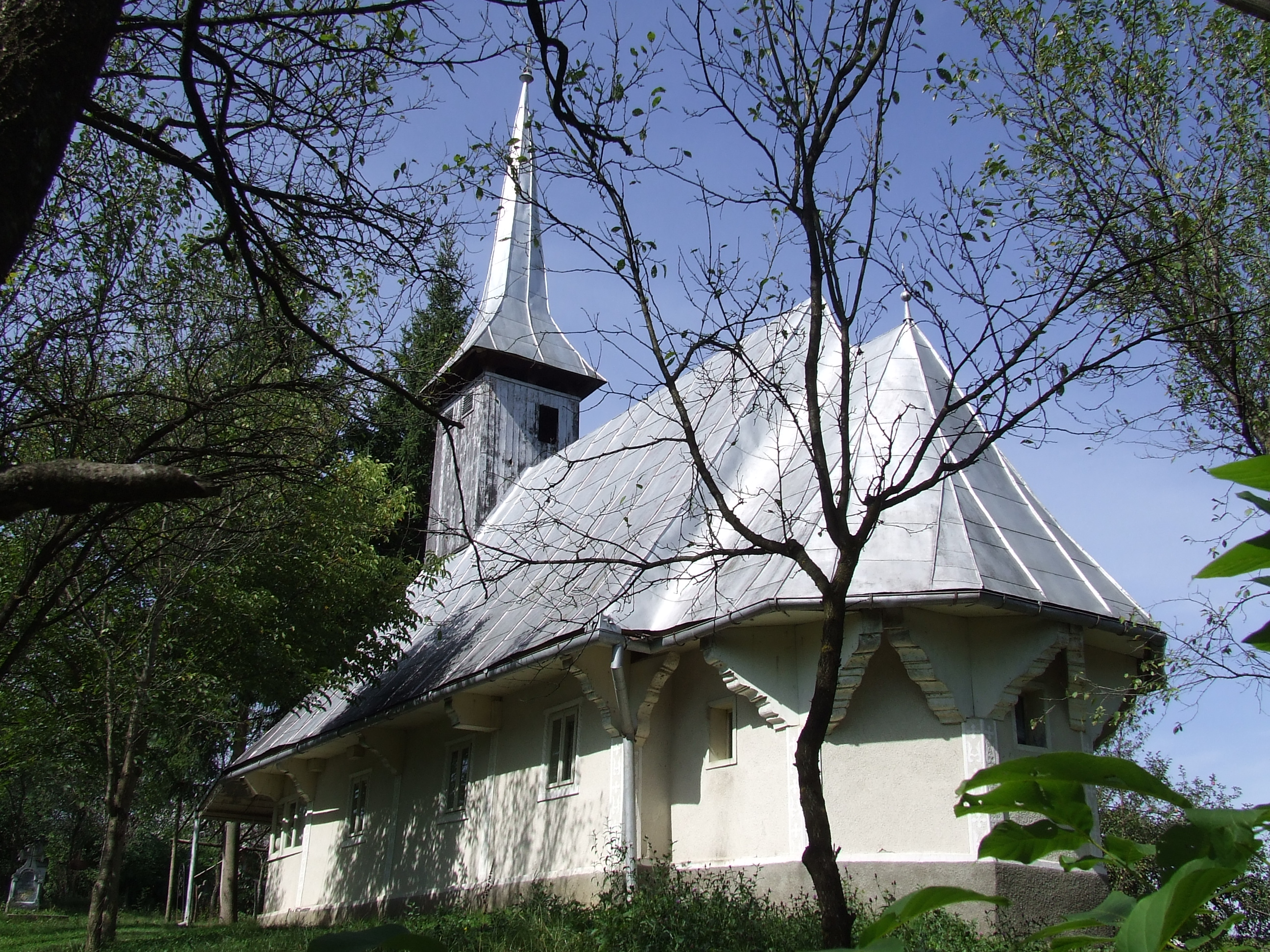
- Wooden Church in Zalha

- Location in Sălaj County

- Location in Romania
- Coordinates: 47°11′39″N 23°31′40″E
- Country: Romania
- County: Sălaj

Government
  - Mayor (2020–2024): Vasile-Traian Seliștean (USR PLUS)
- Area: 51.10 km^{2} (19.73 sq mi)
- Elevation: 319 m (1,047 ft)
- Population (2021-12-01): 767
  - Density: 15.0/km^{2} (38.9/sq mi)
- Time zone: UTC+02:00 (EET)
  - Summer (DST): UTC+03:00 (EEST)
- Postal code: 457360
- Area code: +(40) 260
- Vehicle reg.: SJ
- Website: www.comunazalha.ro

Zalha (Hungarian: Zálha) is a commune located in Sălaj County, Transylvania, Romania. It is composed of seven villages: Ceaca (Almáscsáka), Ciureni (Csurenypuszta), Valea Ciurenilor (Csurenyvölgy), Valea Hranei (Tormapataka), Valea Lungă (Gorbómező), Vârteșca (Virtyeskatelep), and Zalha.

Historical population
Year	Pop.	±%
1850	1,587	—
1880	1,733	+9.2%
1900	2,197	+26.8%
1910	2,383	+8.5%
1920	2,312	−3.0%
1930	2,667	+15.4%
1941	2,825	+5.9%
1956	2,935	+3.9%
1966	2,546	−13.3%
1977	2,140	−15.9%
1992	1,462	−31.7%
2002	1,177	−19.5%
2011	864	−26.6%
2021	767	−11.2%
Source: Census data

== Sights ==
- Wooden Church in Ciureni, built in the 18th century (1776)
- Wooden Church in Zalha, built in the 19th century (1821)
