= Căoi =

Căoi Vecel-patak
- Location within Romania

Location
- Country: Romania
- Counties: Hunedoara County
- Villages: Chergheș, Căoi, Vețel

Physical characteristics
- Mouth: Mureș
  - location: Vețel
  - coordinates: 45.9078°N 22.7990°E
- Length: 8 km (5.0 mi)
- Basin size: 19 km^{2} (7.3 sq mi)

Basin features
- Progression: Mureș→ Tisza→ Danube→ Black Sea

The Căoi (Hungarian: Vecel-patak) is a left tributary of the river Mureș in Romania. It discharges into the Mureș in Vețel. Its length is 8 km (5.0 mi) and its basin size is 19 km^{2} (7.3 sq mi).
