= Ciugud (river) =

Ciugud Csüged-patak
- Location within Romania

Location
- Country: Romania
- Counties: Alba County
- Villages: Ciugudu de Sus, Ciugudu de Jos, Inoc

Physical characteristics
- Mouth: Mureș
  - location: Inoc
  - coordinates: 46.3746°N 23.7857°E
- Length: 15 km (9.3 mi)
- Basin size: 35 km^{2} (14 sq mi)

Basin features
- Progression: Mureș→ Tisza→ Danube→ Black Sea

The Ciugud (Hungarian: Csüged-patak) is a right tributary of the river Mureș in Transylvania, Romania. It discharges into the Mureș in Inoc. Its length is 15 km (9.3 mi) and its basin size is 35 km^{2} (14 sq mi).
