= Ciucic =

Ciucic Köcs-patak
- Location within Romania

Location
- Country: Romania
- Counties: Harghita County

Physical characteristics
- Mouth: Mureș
  - location: Platonești
  - coordinates: 46.9047°N 25.4237°E

Basin features
- Progression: Mureș→ Tisza→ Danube→ Black Sea
- Tributaries
  - left: Strugu

The Ciucic (Hungarian: Köcs-patak) is a right tributary of the river Mureș in Transylvania, Romania. It discharges into the Mureș in Platonești. Its length is 9 km (5.6 mi) and its basin size is 14 km^{2} (5.4 sq mi).
