= Cătușa =

Boca
- Location within Romania

Location
- Country: Romania
- Counties: Galați County
- Cities: Galați

Physical characteristics
- Mouth: Siret
  - coordinates: 45.401°N 27.992°E
- Length: 15 km (9.3 mi)
- Basin size: 72 km^{2} (28 sq mi)

Basin features
- Progression: Siret→ Danube→ Black Sea
- Tributaries
  - right: Făloaia
- River code: XII.1.86

The Cătușa is a left tributary of the river Siret in Romania. It flows into the Siret near the city Galați. The basin size of the 15 km (9.3 mi) long Cătușa is 72 km^{2} (28 sq mi).
