= Cacova (river) =

River of romênia

- Location within Romania

Location
- Country: Romania
- Counties: Vâlcea County
- Villages: Gruiu, Stoenești

Physical characteristics
- Mouth: Govora
  - location: Stoenești
  - coordinates: 45.1192°N 24.1608°E
- Length: 8 km (5.0 mi)
- Basin size: 15 km^{2} (5.8 sq mi)

Basin features
- Progression: Govora→ Olt→ Danube→ Black Sea

The Cacova is a left tributary of the river Govora in Romania. It flows into the Govora in Stoenești. Its length is 8 km (5.0 mi) and its basin size is 15 km^{2} (5.8 sq mi).
