= Șimișna =

- Commune

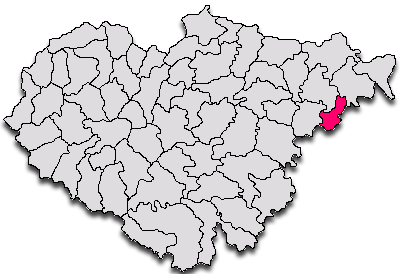
- Location in Sălaj County

- Location in Romania
- Coordinates: 47°13′54″N 23°37′24″E
- Country: Romania
- County: Sălaj

Government
  - Mayor (2020–2024): Călin-Cristian Prodan (PSD)
- Area: 45.23 km^{2} (17.46 sq mi)
- Elevation: 249 m (817 ft)
- Population (2021-12-01): 833
  - Density: 18.4/km^{2} (47.7/sq mi)
- Time zone: UTC+02:00 (EET)
  - Summer (DST): UTC+03:00 (EEST)
- Postal code: 457294
- Area code: +(40) 0260
- Vehicle reg.: SJ
- Website: www.primariasimisna.ro

Șimișna (Hungarian: Semesnye) is a commune located in Sălaj County, Transylvania, Romania. It is composed of two villages, Hășmaș (Alsóhagymás) and Șimișna. These were part of Rus Commune until 2002, when they were split off.
