= Neagra (Bistrița) =

- Location within Romania

Location
- Country: Romania
- Counties: Suceava County
- Villages: Gura Haitii, Neagra Șarului, Șaru Dornei, Dorna-Arini

Physical characteristics
- Mouth: Bistrița
  - location: Downstream of Vatra Dornei
  - coordinates: 47.3416°N 25.4006°E
- Length: 34 km (21 mi)
- Basin size: 313 km^{2} (121 sq mi)

Basin features
- Progression: Bistrița→ Siret→ Danube→ Black Sea

The Neagra is a right tributary of the river Bistrița in Romania. It discharges into the Bistrița in Dorna-Arini near Vatra Dornei. Its length is 34 km (21 mi) and its basin size is 313 km^{2} (121 sq mi).

== Tributaries ==
The following rivers are tributaries to the river Neagra (from source to mouth):

- Left: Neagra Șarului, Pinul, Pârâul Feții, Hagiul, Biserica, Haita, Pârâul cu Pește, Runcu, Sărișorul Mare, Borcutul
- Right: Calul, Zăpodea, Granița, Bâuca, Tăieturii, Călimănel, Pârâul Rusului
