= Rus, Sălaj =

Rus
- Commune
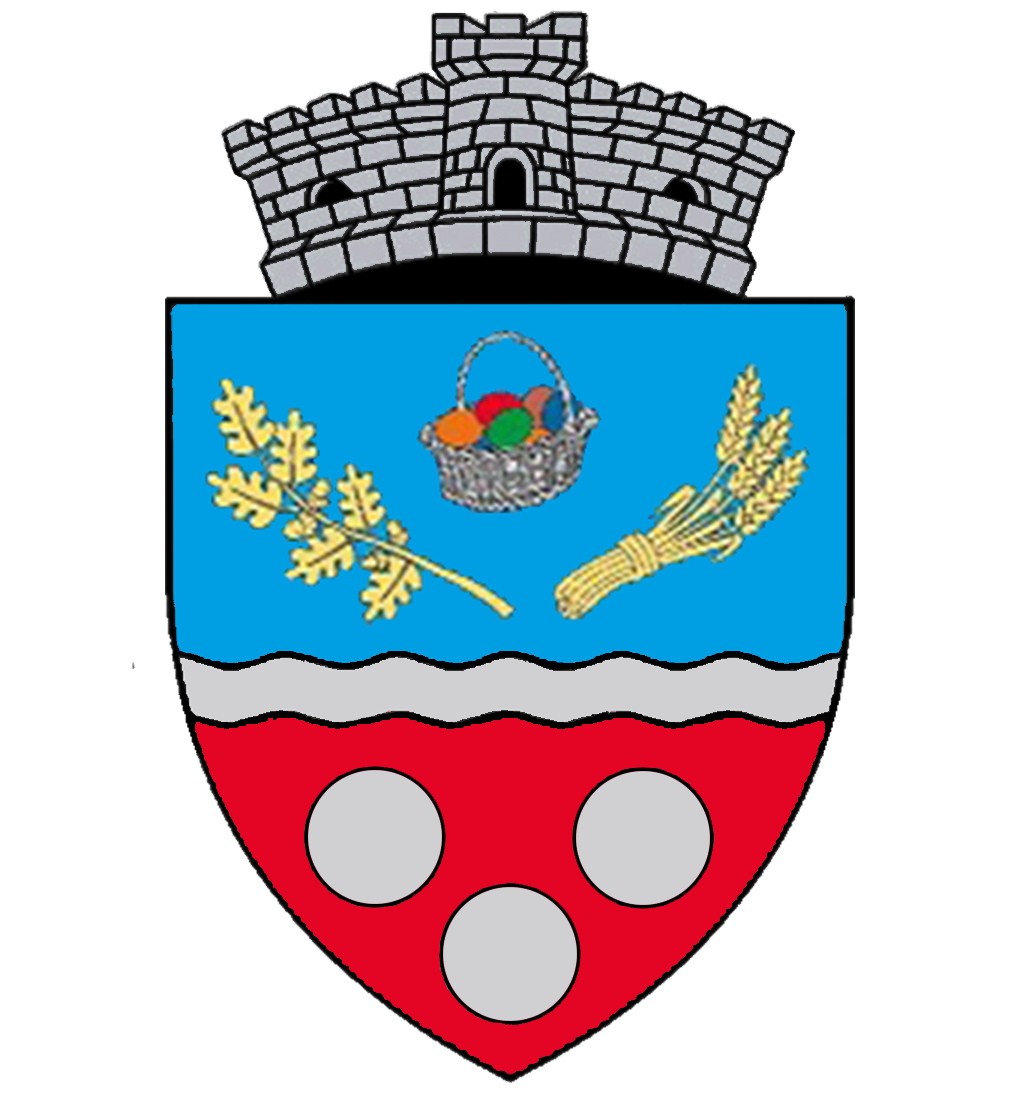
- Coat of arms

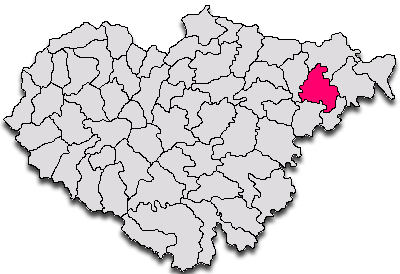
- Location in Sălaj County

- Location in Romania
- Coordinates: 47.2742°N 23.5908°E
- Country: Romania
- County: Sălaj

Government
  - Mayor (2020–2024): Ioan-Aurelian Cozma (PNL)
- Area: 50.97 km^{2} (19.68 sq mi)
- Elevation: 212 m (696 ft)
- Population (2021-12-01): 909
  - Density: 18/km^{2} (46/sq mi)
- Time zone: EET/EEST (UTC+2/+3)
- Postal code: 457290
- Area code: +(40) 260
- Vehicle reg.: SJ
- Website: www.primaria-rus.ro

Rus (Hungarian: Oroszmező) is a commune located in Sălaj County, Transylvania, Romania. It is composed of three villages: Buzaș (Buzamező), Fântânele-Rus (Kabalapatak), and Rus. It also included two other villages until 2002, when they were split off to form Șimișna Commune.
