= Călimănel (Mureș) =

Călimănel Kelemen-patak
- Location within Romania

Location
- Country: Romania
- Counties: Harghita County

Physical characteristics
- Mouth: Mureș
  - coordinates: 46.9370°N 25.3256°E
- Length: 17 km (11 mi)
- Basin size: 61 km^{2} (24 sq mi)

Basin features
- Progression: Mureș→ Tisza→ Danube→ Black Sea
- Tributaries
  - left: Călimănelul cel Tulbure
  - right: Inorești

The Călimănel (Hungarian: Kelemen-patak) is a right tributary of the river Mureș in Transylvania, Romania. It discharges into the Mureș near Toplița. Its length is 17 km (11 mi) and its basin size is 61 km^{2} (24 sq mi).
