= Dănicei =

- Commune
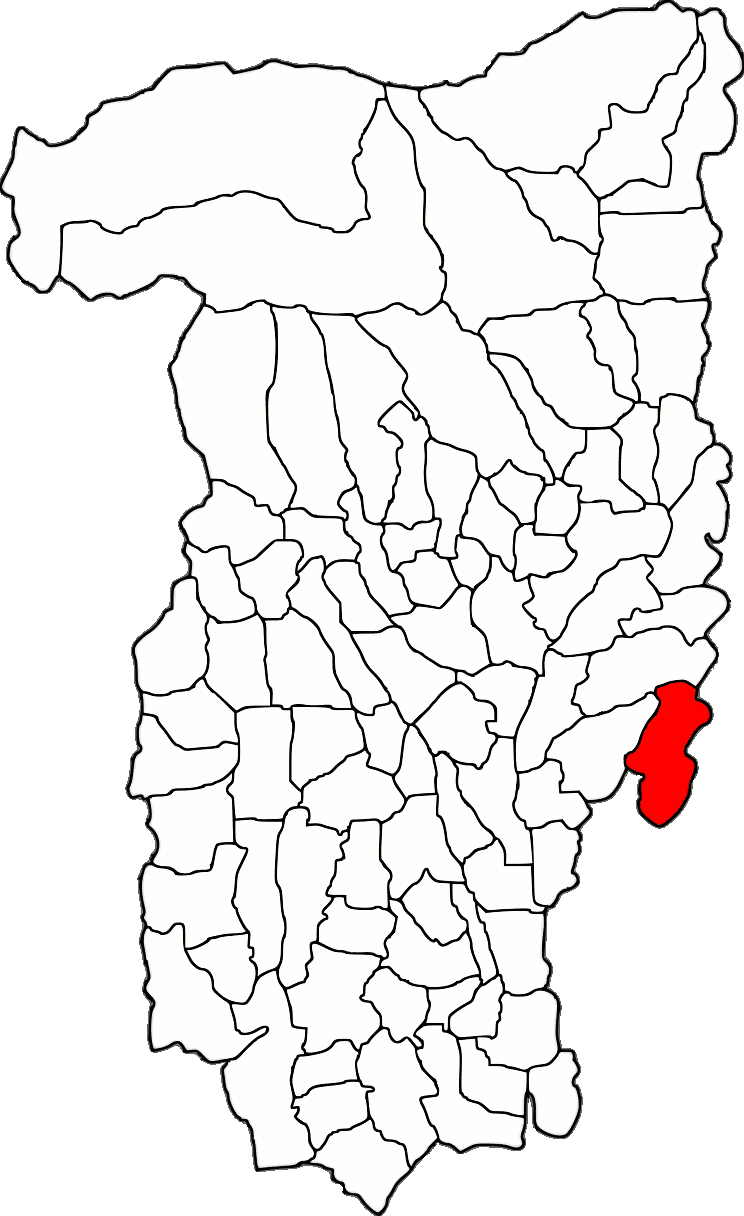
- Location in Vâlcea County

- Location in Romania
- Coordinates: 44°54′N 24°23′E
- Country: Romania
- County: Vâlcea
- Area: 57.25 km^{2} (22.10 sq mi)
- Population (2021-12-01): 1,667
  - Density: 29.12/km^{2} (75.42/sq mi)
- Time zone: UTC+02:00 (EET)
  - Summer (DST): UTC+03:00 (EEST)
- Vehicle reg.: VL

Dănicei is a commune located in Vâlcea County, Muntenia, Romania. It is composed of thirteen villages: Bădeni, Ceretu, Cireșul, Dealu Lăunele (the commune centre), Dealu Scheiului, Dobrești, Drăgulești, Glodu, Gura Crucilor, Lăunele de Jos, Linia pe Vale, Udrești and Valea Scheiului.
