= Borca, Neamț =

Borca
- Commune
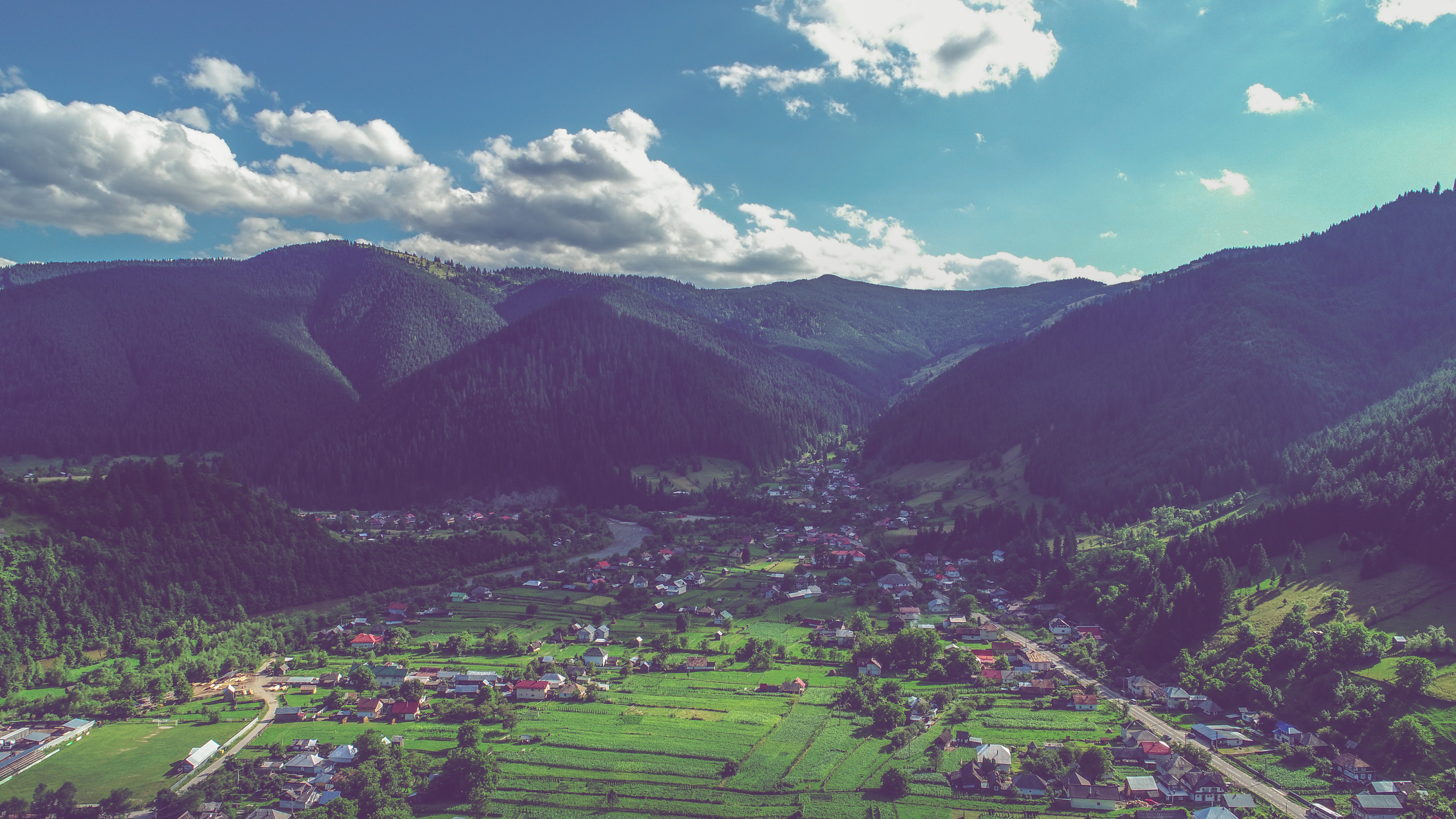

- Location in Neamț County

- Location in Romania
- Coordinates: 47°11′N 25°46′E
- Country: Romania
- County: Neamț

Government
  - Mayor (2020–2024): Petrică Ruscanu (PSD)
- Area: 205.18 km^{2} (79.22 sq mi)
- Elevation: 611 m (2,005 ft)
- Population (2021-12-01): 5,860
  - Density: 28.6/km^{2} (74.0/sq mi)
- Time zone: UTC+02:00 (EET)
  - Summer (DST): UTC+03:00 (EEST)
- Postal code: 617075
- Area code: +(40) 233
- Vehicle reg.: NT
- Website: primariaborca.ro

Borca is a commune in Neamț County, Western Moldavia, Romania. It is composed of seven villages: Borca, Lunca, Mădei, Pârâul Cârjei, Pârâul Pântei, Sabasa, and Soci.

The commune is located in the northwestern part of Neamț County, 67 km (42 mi) west of Târgu Neamț and 77 km (48 mi) northwest of the county seat, Piatra Neamț, on the border with Harghita and Suceava counties.

Historical population
Year	Pop.	±%
2002	6,626	—
2011	6,148	−7.2%
2021	5,860	−4.7%
Source: Census data

== Natives ==
- Gheorghe Cartianu-Popescu (1907–1982), engineer
- Dumitrina Mitrea (born 1971), politician
