= Chisindia =

- Commune
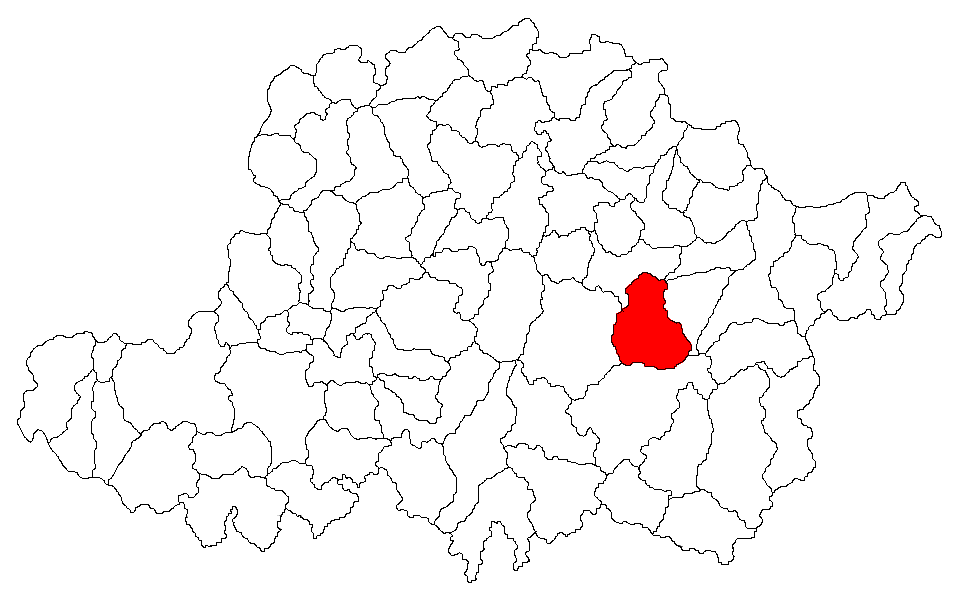
- Location in Arad County

- Location in Romania
- Coordinates: 46°17′N 22°6′E
- Country: Romania
- County: Arad
- Population (2021-12-01): 1,146
- Time zone: EET/EEST (UTC+2/+3)
- Vehicle reg.: AR

Chisindia (Hungarian: Keszend) is a commune in Arad County, Romania.Chisindia lies in the southern part of the Sebiș Basin, at the foot of the Cuedului Hills, and it has a surface of 12928 ha. It is composed of three villages: Chisindia (situated at 92 km from Arad), Păiușeni (Pajzs) and Văsoaia (Vészalja).

== Population ==
According to the last census, the population of the commune counts 1580 inhabitants, out of which 98.2% are Romanians, 0.1% Hungarians, 1.5% Roms and 0.2% are of other or undeclared nationalities.

== History ==
The first documentary record of the locality Chisindia dates back to 1349. Păiușeni was mentioned in documents in 1574, while Văsoaia in 1574.

== Economy ==
The economy of the commune is mainly agricultural, both component sectors are well-developed.
