= Sâmburești =

- Commune
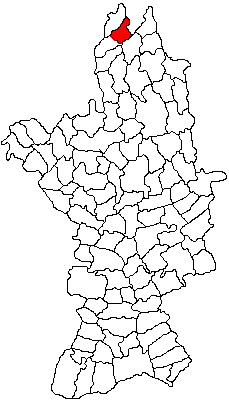
- Location in Olt County

- Location in Romania
- Coordinates: 44°48′N 24°25′E
- Country: Romania
- County: Olt
- Population (2021-12-01): 1,058
- Time zone: EET/EEST (UTC+2/+3)
- Vehicle reg.: OT

Sâmburești is a commune in Olt County, Muntenia, Romania. It is composed of seven villages: Cerbeni, Ionicești, Lăunele, Mănulești, Sâmburești, Stănuleasa and Tonești.
