= Panaci =

- Commune
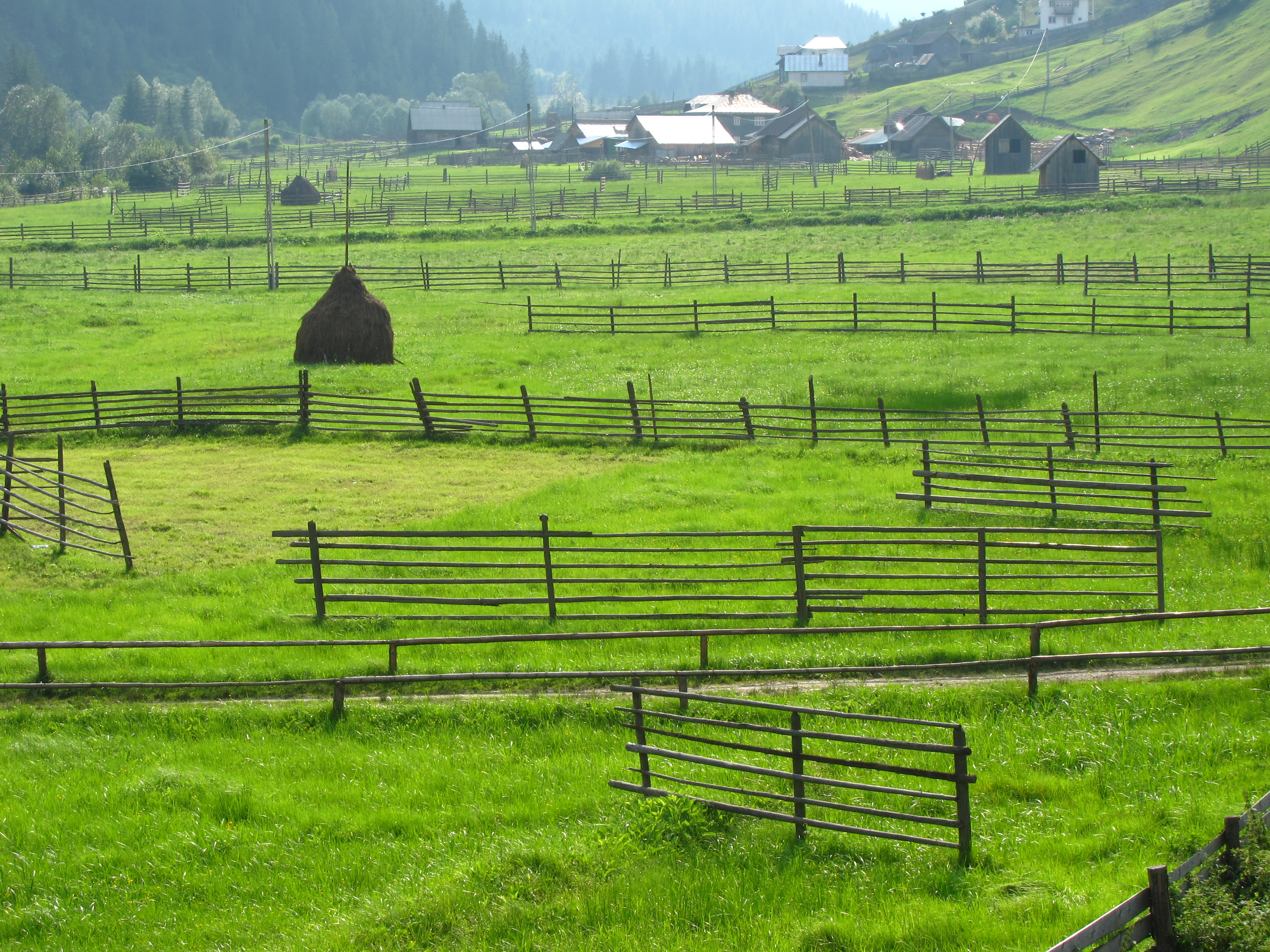
- Meadows near Panaci

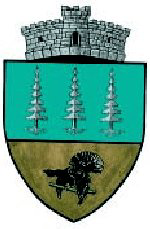
- Coat of arms

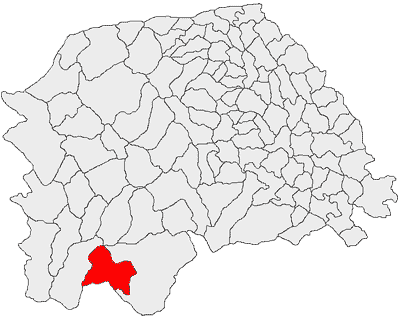
- Location in Suceava County

- Location in Romania
- Coordinates: 47°15′N 25°23′E
- Country: Romania
- County: Suceava

Government
  - Mayor (2020–2024): Vasile Cozan (PSD)
- Area: 137.54 km^{2} (53.10 sq mi)
- Elevation: 908 m (2,979 ft)
- Population (2021-12-01): 2,036
  - Density: 14.80/km^{2} (38.34/sq mi)
- Time zone: UTC+02:00 (EET)
  - Summer (DST): UTC+03:00 (EEST)
- Postal code: 727405
- Area code: +(40) 230
- Vehicle reg.: SV
- Website: panaci.ro

Panaci is a commune located in Suceava County, Romania, in the historical region of Western Moldavia. It is composed of six villages: Catrinari, Coverca, Drăgoiasa, Glodu, Panaci, and Păltiniș.
