= Stoenești, Vâlcea =

Stoenești
- Commune
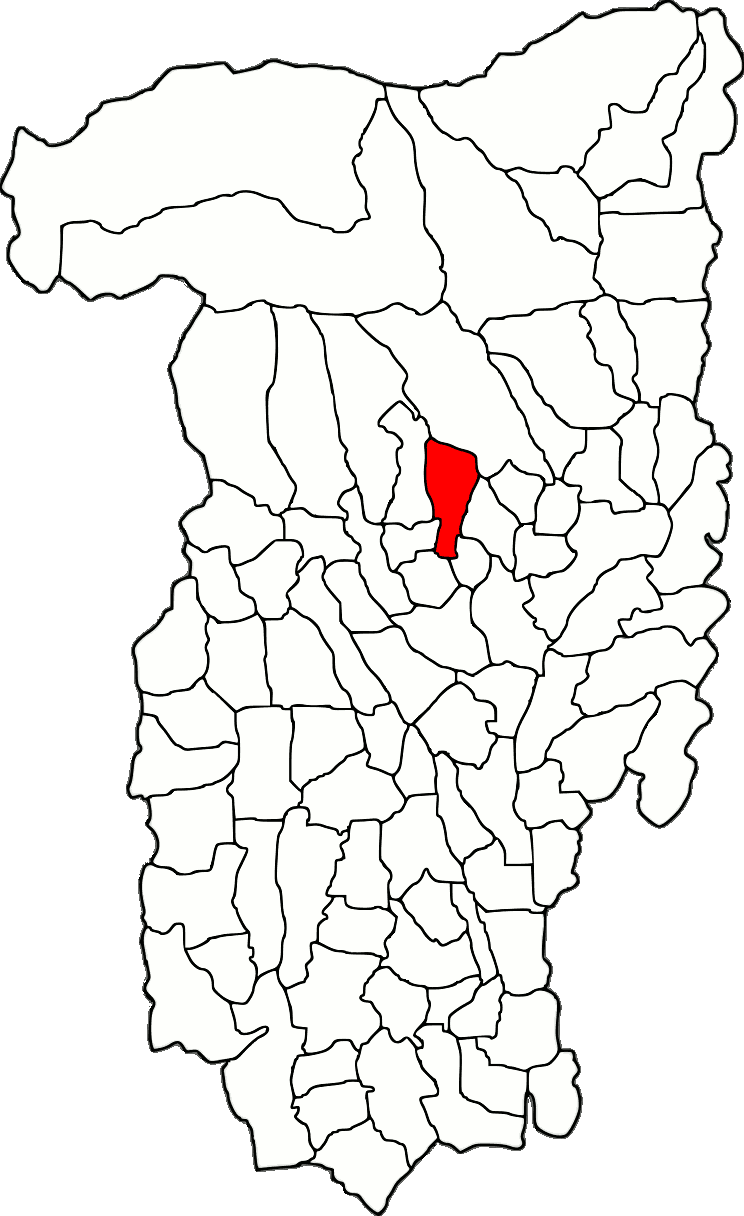
- Location in Vâlcea County

- Location in Romania
- Coordinates: 45.123°N 24.162°E
- Country: Romania
- County: Vâlcea
- Population (2021-12-01): 3,203
- Time zone: EET/EEST (UTC+2/+3)
- Vehicle reg.: VL

Stoenești is a commune located in Vâlcea County, Oltenia, Romania. It is composed of thirteen villages: Bârlogu, Budurăști, Deleni, Dobriceni, Gruieri, Gruiu, Mogoșești, Neghinești, Piscu Mare (until 1964 Cacova), Popești, Stoenești, Suseni and Zmeurătu.
