= Leleasca =

- Commune
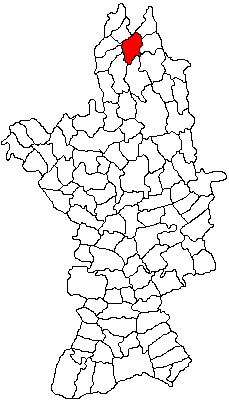
- Location in Olt County

- Location in Romania
- Coordinates: 44°47′N 24°26′E
- Country: Romania
- County: Olt
- Population (2021-12-01): 1,198
- Time zone: EET/EEST (UTC+2/+3)
- Vehicle reg.: OT

Leleasca is a commune in Olt County, Muntenia, Romania. It is composed of seven villages: Afumați, Greerești, Leleasca, Mierlicești, Tonești, Tufaru and Urși.
