= Șaru Dornei =

- Commune
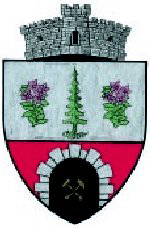
- Coat of arms

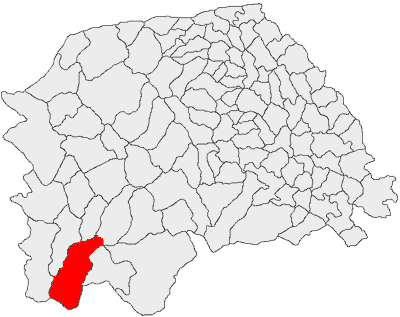
- Location in Suceava County

- Location in Romania
- Coordinates: 47°17′N 25°21′E
- Country: Romania
- County: Suceava
- Subdivisions: Șaru Dornei, Gura Haitii, Neagra Șarului, Plaiu Șarului, Sărișor, Sărișoru Mare, Șaru Bucovinei

Government
  - Mayor (2024–2028): Ioan Cătălin Iordache (PNL)
- Area: 180 km^{2} (69 sq mi)
- Elevation: 845 m (2,772 ft)
- Population (2021-12-01): 3,905
  - Density: 22/km^{2} (56/sq mi)
- Time zone: UTC+02:00 (EET)
  - Summer (DST): UTC+03:00 (EEST)
- Postal code: 727515
- Area code: (+40) x30
- Vehicle reg.: SV
- Website: saru-dornei.ro

Șaru Dornei is a commune located in Suceava County, northeastern Romania. It is composed of seven villages, six located in the historical region of Western Moldavia, Gura Haitii, Neagra Șarului (the commune centre), Plaiu Șarului, Sărișor, Sărișoru Mare, and Șaru Dornei, and one, Șaru Bucovinei, located in Bukovina.

== Administration and local politics ==
=== Commune council ===
The commune's current local council has the following political composition, according to the results of the 2020 Romanian local elections:

Party	Seats	Current Council
National Liberal Party (PNL)	8	
Social Democratic Party (PSD)	2	
People's Movement Party (PMP)	2	
Save Romania Union (USR)	1	
