= Cungrea =

- Commune
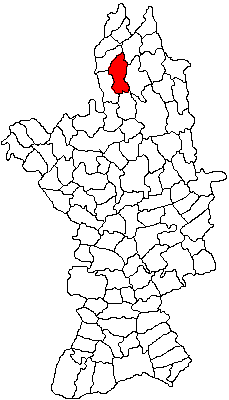
- Location in Olt County

- Location in Romania
- Coordinates: 44°40′N 24°23′E
- Country: Romania
- County: Olt
- Population (2021-12-01): 1,771
- Time zone: EET/EEST (UTC+2/+3)
- Vehicle reg.: OT

Cungrea is a commune in Olt County, Muntenia, Romania. It is composed of seven villages: Cepești, Cungrea, Ibănești, Miești, Oteștii de Jos, Oteștii de Sus and Spătaru.
