= Bogdand =

Bogdand Bogdánd
- Commune
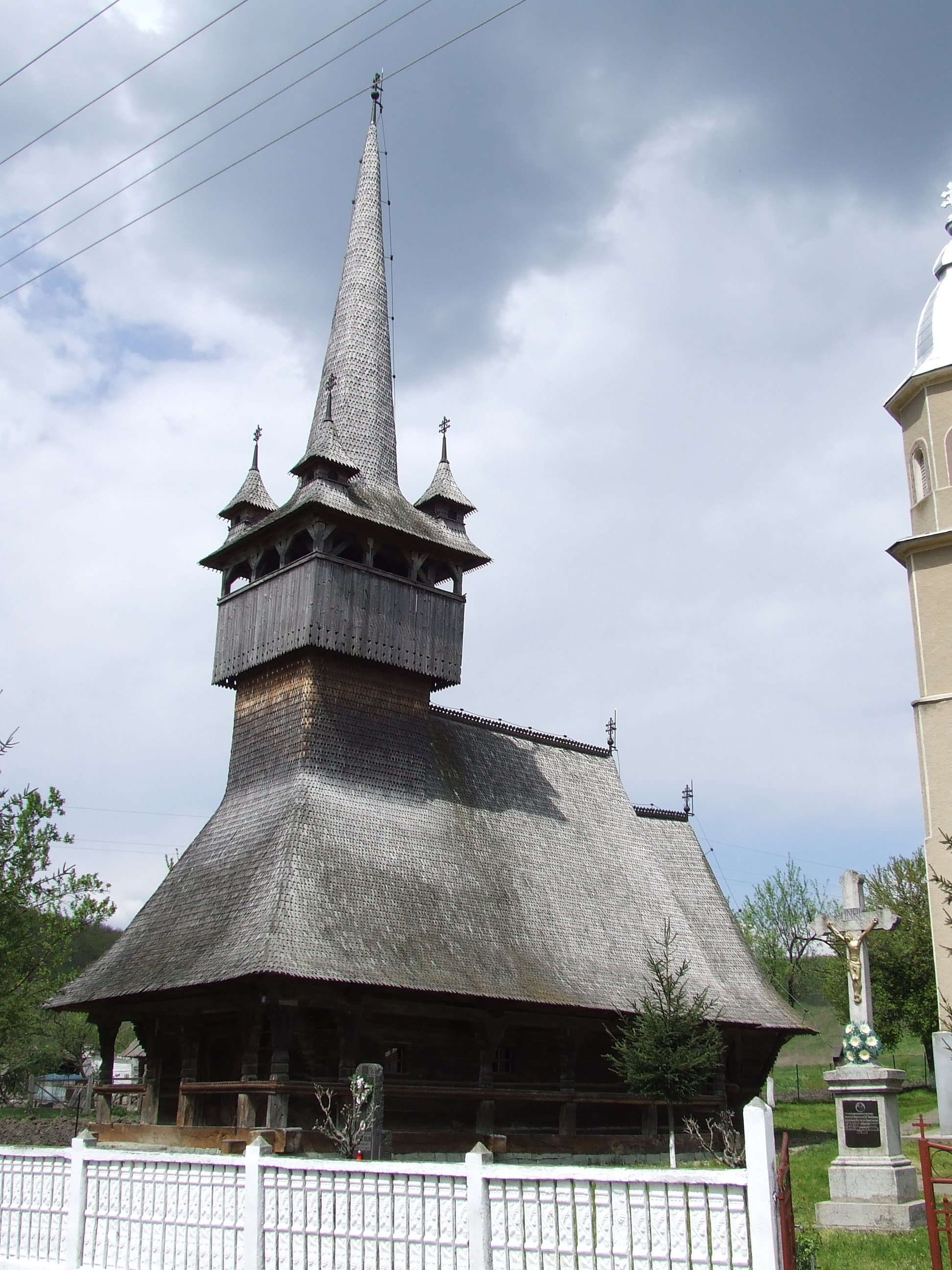
- Wooden in church in Corund

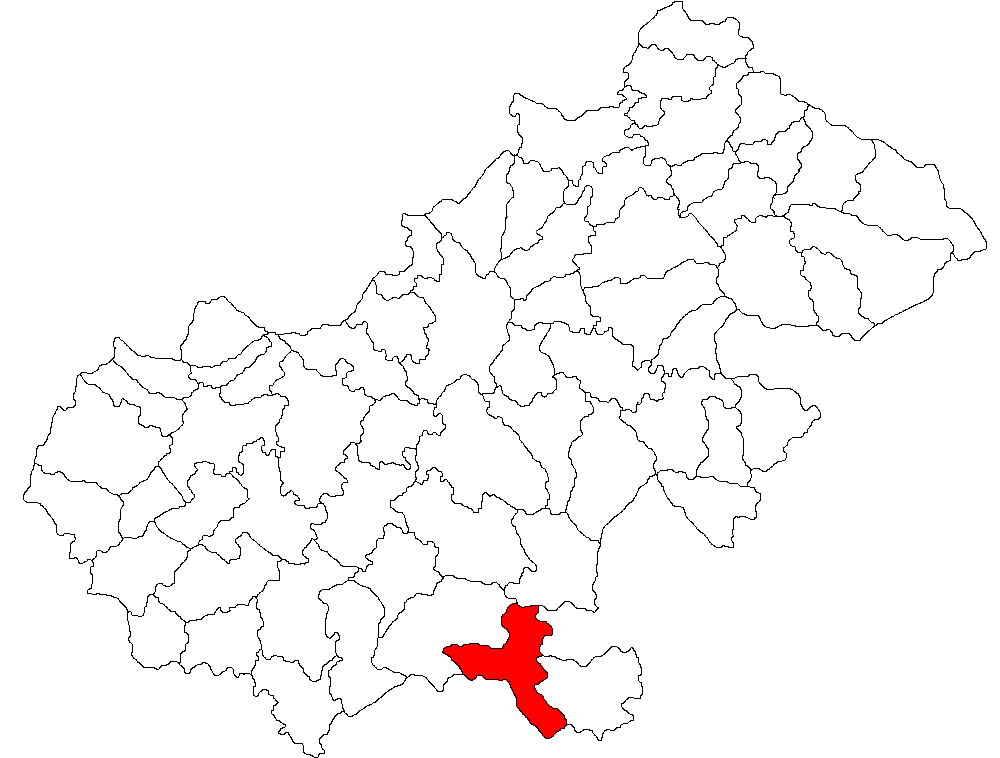
- Location in Satu Mare County

- Location in Romania
- Coordinates: 47°24′55″N 22°55′48″E
- Country: Romania
- County: Satu Mare
- Subdivisions: Babța, Bogdand, Corund, Ser

Government
  - Mayor (2020–2024): Aurel Bojan (PNL)
- Area: 82.94 km^{2} (32.02 sq mi)
- Elevation: 163 m (535 ft)
- Population (2021-12-01): 2,715
  - Density: 32.73/km^{2} (84.78/sq mi)
- Time zone: UTC+02:00 (EET)
  - Summer (DST): UTC+03:00 (EEST)
- Postal code: 447060
- Area code: +(40) 261
- Vehicle reg.: SM
- Website: www.primariabogdand.ro

Bogdand (Hungarian: Bogdánd; Hungarian pronunciation: [ˈboɡdaːnd]) is a commune in Satu Mare County in Crișana, Romania. The commune is composed of four villages: Babța (Bábca), Bogdand, Corund (Szilágykorond), and Ser (Szér).

The commune is located in the southern part of Satu Mare County, 57 km (35 mi) from the county seat, on the border with Sălaj County.

== Demographics ==
At the 2011 census, Bogdand had a population of 2,872; out of them, 57.45% were Hungarians, 36.14% were Romanians, and 5.15% were Roma. At the 2021 census, there were 2,715 inhabitants; of those, 56.17% were Hungarians, 35.62% Romanians, and 6.63% Roma.

== Tourist attractions ==
The most significant local tourist attractions are:

- The Sipos László Hungarian Museum in Bogdand village
- The Holy Archangels wooden church in Corund village, built in 1723
- The Reformed church in Ser village
