= Vadu Crișului – Aștileu Canal =

- Location: Bihor County
- Country: Romania

Specifications
- Length: 14.5 km (9.0 mi)

Geography
- Start point: Crișul Repede at Vadu Crișului
- End point: Crișul Repede near Aleșd
- Beginning coordinates: 46.9815°N 22.5079°E
- Ending coordinates: 47.0479°N 22.3918°E

The Vadu Crișului – Aștileu Canal (called colloquially Canalu de Apă) is a canal in Bihor County, Romania. It diverts part of the discharge of the river Crișul Repede for the supply of the Aștileu hydroelectric plant with an installed capacity of 2.8 MW. It is 14.5 km (9.0 mi) long. The canal was built in 1954. It starts near the village of Vadu Crișului and runs parallel to the course of the Crișul Repede, running in the proximity of the villages Birtin, Dobricionești, Josani, Măgești and Aștileu, finally connecting with the Crișul Repede near the town of Aleșd. The canal also catches the discharges of the tributaries of the Crișul Repede it intersects.
