= Debla River =

Debla

Location
- Country: Romania
- Counties: Bihor County

Physical characteristics
- Mouth: Dobrinești
  - location: Gălășeni Cave

Basin features
- Progression: sinkhole→ Groapa Moțului→ Dobrinești→ Crișul Repede→ Körös→ Tisza→ Danube→ Black Sea

The Debla is a small river in the Pădurea Craiului Mountains of Bihor County, Romania. It disappears into the Gălășeni Cave near the village Gălășeni and continues its flow underground through the cave. It emerges in the Groapa Moțului Cave, near the village of Josani. It flows into the lower reach of the river Dobrinești.
