= Medeș =

- Location within Romania

Location
- Country: Romania
- Counties: Bihor County
- Villages: Hotar, Călătani

Physical characteristics
- Source
  - coordinates: 46°58′55″N 22°18′9″E
  - elevation: 442 m (1,450 ft)
- Mouth: Crișul Repede
  - location: Săbolciu
  - coordinates: 47°3′52″N 22°8′47″E
  - elevation: 158 m (518 ft)
- Length: 22 km (14 mi)
- Basin size: 54 km^{2} (21 sq mi)

Basin features
- Progression: Crișul Repede→ Körös→ Tisza→ Danube→ Black Sea
- Tributaries
  - left: Cloșcoi

The Medeș is a left tributary of the river Crișul Repede in Romania. It discharges into the Crișul Repede in Săbolciu. Its length is 22 km (14 mi) and its basin size is 54 km^{2} (21 sq mi).
