= Doina lui Lucaciu =

Romanian patriotic song

"Doina lui Lucaciu" (transl. "Lucaciu's Doina") is a Romanian patriotic song dedicated to the orator, activist and Greek Catholic priest Vasile Lucaciu (1852–1922).

The first version of the song was authored by Iosif Vulcan in 1870. Taking up the doina form, he lamented the imprisonment of Alexandru Roman, who had been sentenced by the Kingdom of Hungary for a series of offenses culminating with the publication of the Blaj Pronouncement. The mournful melody invoked a blackbird in a forest. In 1893 and again 1894, the Hungarian authorities tried Lucaciu on various politicized charges. It was while the popular priest was serving a prison sentence at Szeged that Gheorghe Bocu, a teacher from Șiștarovăț in the Banat, substituted “Lucaciu” for “Roman” in the original lyrics. The resulting song gained currency shortly before Lucaciu was tried as a signatory of the Transylvanian Memorandum and sentenced to five years in prison.

== Lyrics ==
The original lyrics are as follows:

Cântă mierla prin păduri
Robu-i Roman la Unguri
Pentru sfânta libertate
Din care noi n'avem parte.

Stâpânii s-au mâniat
Că Roman a cuvântat
Și-n dietă și-n tipar
A spus chinul nostru-amar.

Dar, nu fi mierlă supărată
Nu-i robia ne'ncetată
Vine-o dalbă primăvară
Fi-va Roman liber iară.

Translation:

A blackbird is singing in the woods
Roman is enslaved by the Hungarians
For holy freedom
In which we do not partake.

The masters grew angry
Because Roman spoke out
Both in the diet and in print
About our bitter torment.

But don't be upset, blackbird
Slavery is not forever
A bright springtime is nearing
Roman will be free once more.
