= Borod (river) =

- Location within Romania

Location
- Country: Romania
- Counties: Bihor County
- Villages: Borod, Borozel, Topa de Criș, Gheghie

Physical characteristics
- Mouth: Crișul Repede
  - location: Gheghie
  - coordinates: 47.0147°N 22.5113°E
- Length: 17 km (11 mi)
- Basin size: 118 km^{2} (46 sq mi)

Basin features
- Progression: Crișul Repede→ Körös→ Tisza→ Danube→ Black Sea

The Borod is a right tributary of the river Crișul Repede in Romania. It discharges into the Crișul Repede in Gheghie. Its length is 17 km (11 mi) and its basin size is 118 km^{2} (46 sq mi).

== Tributaries ==
The following rivers are tributaries to the Borod:

- Right: Răchita, Mișca, Cetea
