= Cropandă =

- Location within Romania

Location
- Country: Romania
- Counties: Bihor County
- Villages: Țețchea, Telechiu, Tileagd

Physical characteristics
- Source: Pădurea Craiului Mountains
- Mouth: Crișul Repede
  - location: Downstream of Tileagd
  - coordinates: 47.0676°N 22.1630°E
- Length: 17 km (11 mi)
- Basin size: 16 km^{2} (6.2 sq mi)

Basin features
- Progression: Crișul Repede→ Körös→ Tisza→ Danube→ Black Sea

The Cropandă is a left tributary of the river Crișul Repede in Romania. It discharges into the Crișul Repede near Tileagd. Its length is 17 km (11 mi) and its basin size is 16 km^{2} (6.2 sq mi).
