= Sarand =

Sarand may refer to:

- Sáránd, Hungary
- Sarand, Iran (disambiguation)
- Sărand (Hungarian: Szaránd), a village in the commune Copăcel, Romania
- Sărand, a river in Bihor County, Romania
