= Fonău =

- Location within Romania

Location
- Country: Romania
- Counties: Bihor County
- Villages: Cărăndeni, Cărănzel, Fonău

Physical characteristics
- Source: Cărăndeni
  - coordinates: 46°52′17″N 22°03′56″E
  - elevation: 285 m (935 ft)
- Mouth: Valea Nouă
  - location: Husasău de Tinca
  - coordinates: 46°49′11″N 21°55′42″E
  - elevation: 137 m (449 ft)

Basin features
- Progression: Valea Nouă→ Crișul Negru→ Körös→ Tisza→ Danube→ Black Sea

The Fonău is a left tributary of the Valea Nouă in Romania. It flows into the Valea Nouă in Husasău de Tinca. Its length is 18 km (11 mi) and its basin size is 30 km^{2} (12 sq mi).
