= Cloșcoi =

- Location within Romania

Location
- Country: Romania
- Counties: Bihor County
- Villages: Tilecuș, Călătani

Physical characteristics
- Source
  - coordinates: 46°59′35″N 22°13′58″E
  - elevation: 302 m (991 ft)
- Mouth: Medeș
  - location: Călătani
  - coordinates: 47°2′46″N 22°11′56″E
  - elevation: 179 m (587 ft)
- Length: 10 km (6.2 mi)
- Basin size: 15 km^{2} (5.8 sq mi)

Basin features
- Progression: Medeș→ Crișul Repede→ Körös→ Tisza→ Danube→ Black Sea
- River code: III.1.44.24.1

The Cloșcoi is a left tributary of the river Medeș in Romania. It flows into the Medeș in Călătani. Its length is 10 km (6.2 mi) and its basin size is 15 km^{2} (5.8 sq mi).
