= Drăgan Dam =

Coordinates: 46.7888°N 22.7155°E

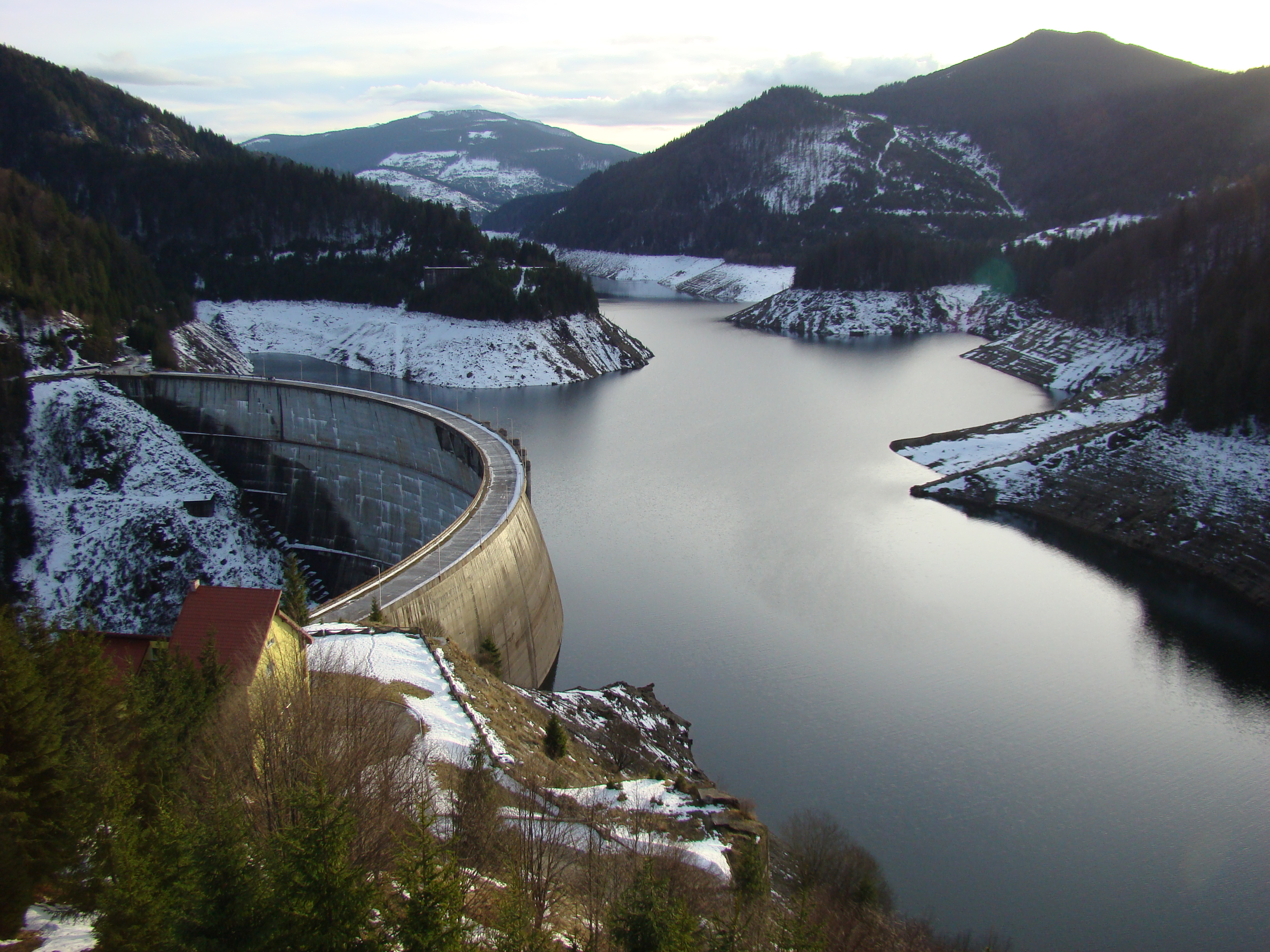
- Drăgan Dam in November 2008
- Country: Romania
- Purpose: Electricity production, flood mitigation, irrigation
- Status: Operational
- Opening date: 1987

Dam and spillways
- Type of dam: Arch dam
- Height (foundation): 120m
- Length: 424m

Reservoir
- Creates: Drăgan Lake

The Drăgan (or Floroiu) Dam is an artificial dam in Romania, completed in 1987, which allows the retention of the waters of the Drăgan and Sebeșel rivers, being located immediately downstream of the confluence of the two rivers. The lake's water is used for electricity production, flood mitigation and irrigation.

== Hydrotechnical data ==
The concrete arch dam was completed in 1987, has a height of 120 m, and the length of the crown is 424 m. The reservoir, under normal conditions, has an area of 292 hectares and 112 million cubic meters of water.

== Access routes ==
The Drăgan reservoir is located 25 km from the E60 road if you enter from Bucea and 20 km if you enter between Ciucea and Poieni.
