= Cacuciu =

Cacuciu may refer to several places in Romania:

- Căcuciu, a village in Beica de Jos Commune, Mureș County
- Cacuciu Nou, a village in Măgești Commune, Bihor County
- Cacuciu Vechi, a village in Aușeu Commune, Bihor County
