= Pârâu (Valea Nouă) =

- Location within Romania

Location
- Country: Romania
- Counties: Bihor County
- Villages: Calea Mare, Lăzăreni, Gepiș, Oșand

Physical characteristics
- Source: Calea Mare
  - coordinates: 46°54′41″N 22°03′41″E
  - elevation: 278 m (912 ft)
- Mouth: Valea Nouă
  - location: Oșand
  - coordinates: 46°50′33″N 21°55′55″E
  - elevation: 145 m (476 ft)
- Length: 18 km (11 mi)
- Basin size: 41 km^{2} (16 sq mi)

Basin features
- Progression: Valea Nouă→ Crișul Negru→ Körös→ Tisza→ Danube→ Black Sea

The Pârâu is a left tributary of the river Valea Nouă in Romania. It flows into the Valea Nouă near Oșand. Its length is 18 km (11 mi) and its basin size is 41 km^{2} (16 sq mi).
