= Dașor =

- Location within Romania

Location
- Country: Romania
- Counties: Bihor County

Physical characteristics
- Mouth: Iad
  - coordinates: 46°50′49″N 22°39′15″E
- Length: 9 km (5.6 mi)
- Basin size: 33 km^{2} (13 sq mi)

Basin features
- Progression: Iad→ Crișul Repede→ Körös→ Tisza→ Danube→ Black Sea
- Tributaries
  - left: Valea Caprei, Lungșorul
- River code: III.1.44.10.2

The Dașor is a right tributary of the river Iad in Romania. It flows into the Iad in Remeți. Its length is 9 km (5.6 mi) and its basin size is 33 km^{2} (13 sq mi).
