= Răchita (Borod) =

- Location within Romania

Location
- Country: Romania
- Counties: Bihor County

Physical characteristics
- Mouth: Borod
  - coordinates: 46.9927°N 22.6203°E
- Length: 12 km (7.5 mi)
- Basin size: 37 km^{2} (14 sq mi)

Basin features
- Progression: Borod→ Crișul Repede→ Körös→ Tisza→ Danube→ Black Sea
- Tributaries
  - left: Șeran
- River code: III.1.44.14.1

The Răchita is a right tributary of the river Borod in Romania. It flows into the Borod in the village Borod. Its length is 12 km (7.5 mi) and its basin size is 37 km^{2} (14 sq mi).
