= Valea Nouă (Crișul Negru) =

- Location within Romania

Location
- Country: Romania
- Counties: Bihor County
- Villages: Mierlău, Șumugiu, Husasău de Tinca, Gurbediu

Physical characteristics
- Source: Mierlău
  - coordinates: 46°55′30″N 22°01′15″E
  - elevation: 236 m (774 ft)
- Mouth: Crișul Negru
  - location: Downstream of Tinca
  - coordinates: 46°43′56″N 21°50′57″E
  - elevation: 102 m (335 ft)
- Length: 32 km (20 mi)
- Basin size: 150 km^{2} (58 sq mi)

Basin features
- Progression: Crișul Negru→ Körös→ Tisza→ Danube→ Black Sea
- Tributaries
  - left: Pârâu, Fonău

The Valea Nouă is a right tributary of the river Crișul Negru in Romania. It discharges into the Crișul Negru near Tinca. The lower reach of the river is channelized. Its length is 32 km (20 mi) and its basin size is 150 km^{2} (58 sq mi).

== Tributaries ==
The following rivers are tributaries to the Valea Nouă:

- Left: Rebi, Hatasău, Mădărăsău, Pârâu, Fonău
- Right: Palincăria, Maca, Boboșița
