= Cetea =

Cetea may refer to several places in Romania:

- Cetea, a village in Galda de Jos Commune, Alba County
- Cetea, a village in Borod Commune, Bihor County
- Cetea (Criș), a tributary of the Borod in Bihor County
- Cetea (Galda), a tributary of the Galda in Alba County

== See also ==
- Cetus (mythology) (pl. Cetea)
