= Hidișel (Peța) =

- Location within Romania

Location
- Country: Romania
- Counties: Bihor County
- Villages: Hidișelu de Sus, Hidișelu de Jos, Băile Felix, Sânmartin

Physical characteristics
- Source: Hidișelu de Sus
  - coordinates: 46°55′20″N 22°05′52″E
  - elevation: 286 m (938 ft)
- Mouth: Peța
  - location: Sânmartin
  - coordinates: 47°00′16″N 21°59′08″E
  - elevation: 144 m (472 ft)

Basin features
- Progression: Peța→ Crișul Repede→ Körös→ Tisza→ Danube→ Black Sea
- River code: III.1.44.30.1

The Hidișel is a left tributary of the river Peța in Romania. It flows into the Peța in Sânmartin, south of Oradea.
