= Drăgan =

Dragan is a masculine given name.

Dragan or Drăgan may also refer to:

== Surname ==
- Alina Drăgan (born 1969), Romanian rhythmic gymnast
- Annaliese Dragan (born 2005), Romanian-American rhythmic gymnast
- Aurel Drăgan (born 1938), Romanian volleyball player
- Christina Dragan (born 2007), Romanian-American rhythmic gymnast
- Claudiu Drăgan (born 1979), Romanian footballer
- Corina Drăgan-Terecoasa (born 1971), Romanian luger
- George Ernest Dragan (1898–1965), Canadian physician and politician
- Iosif Constantin Drăgan (1917–2008), Romanian-Italian businessman, writer and historian
- Ioan Drăgan (1965–2012), Romanian footballer
- Ion Drăgan (born 1996), Moldovan footballer
- Jaromír Dragan (born 1963), Slovak ice hockey player
- Linda Murray-Dragan (born 1952), American sprint canoer
- Mircea Drăgan (1932–2017), Romanian film director
- Mykhailo Dragan (1899–1952), Ukrainian art historian
- Stanisław Dragan (1941–2007), Polish boxer
- Veronica Drăgan (born 1973), Romanian entrepreneur

== Rivers in Romania ==
- Drăgan (Crișul Repede), in Bihor and Cluj Counties
- Drăgan, a tributary of the Florei in Prahova County

== See also ==
- Drăgan Dam, dam in Romania
- Drăganu (disambiguation)
