= Drăgănești =

Drăgănești may refer to:

- Drăgănești-Olt, a town in Olt County, Romania
- Drăgănești-Vlașca, a commune in Teleorman County, Romania
- Drăgănești, Bihor, a commune in Bihor County, Romania
- Drăgănești, Galați, a commune in Galaţi County, Romania
- Drăgănești, Neamț, a commune in Neamț County, Romania
- Drăgănești, Prahova, a commune in Prahova County, Romania
- Drăgănești, a village in Andrieșeni Commune, Iași County, Romania
- Drăgănești, a district in Brezoi town, Vâlcea County, Romania
- Drăgănești, a village in Golești Commune, Vâlcea County, Romania
- Drăgănești, Sîngerei, a commune in Sîngerei district, Moldova

== See also ==
- Drăgănescu (disambiguation)
- Drăgan (disambiguation)
