= Petea =

Petea may refer to:

- Petea, a village in the commune Pălatca, Cluj County, Romania
- Petea, a village in the commune Band, Mureș County, Romania
- Petea, a village in the commune Dorolț, Satu Mare County, Romania
- Petea River, a tributary of the Peţa River in Romania

== People with the name ==
- Petea Vâlcov (1910–1943), Romanian football player
