= Tinca (disambiguation) =

Tinca may refer to several places in Bihor County, Romania:

- Tinca, a commune
- Husasău de Tinca, a commune
- Suplacu de Tinca, a village in Căpâlna Commune

and to:

- Tinca River
- Tench
