= Cetea (Criș) =

- Location within Romania

Location
- Country: Romania
- Counties: Bihor County
- Villages: Cetea, Borozel

Physical characteristics
- Mouth: Borod
  - location: Borozel
  - coordinates: 47.0064°N 22.5599°E
- Length: 11 km (6.8 mi)
- Basin size: 20 km^{2} (7.7 sq mi)

Basin features
- Progression: Borod→ Crișul Repede→ Körös→ Tisza→ Danube→ Black Sea
- River code: III.1.44.14.3

The Cetea is a right tributary of the river Borod in Romania. It flows into the Borod in Borozel. Its length is 11 km (6.8 mi) and its basin size is 20 km^{2} (7.7 sq mi).
