= Crăciun (river) =

- Location within Romania

Location
- Country: Romania
- Counties: Bihor, Cluj

Physical characteristics
- Mouth: Drăgan
  - coordinates: 46.7385°N 22.7084°E
- Length: 10 km (6.2 mi)
- Basin size: 30 km^{2} (12 sq mi)

Basin features
- Progression: Drăgan→ Crișul Repede→ Körös→ Tisza→ Danube→ Black Sea
- Tributaries
  - right: Nimăiasa

The Crăciun is a right tributary of the river Drăgan in Romania. It flows into the Drăgan upstream from the Drăgan-Floroiu Reservoir. Its length is 10 km (6.2 mi) and its basin size is 30 km^{2} (12 sq mi).
