= Adona =

Adona may refer to:

- Adona, Arkansas
- Adona language
- Adona (river), a tributary of the Peța in Romania
- ADONA, a commercial Perfluoroether from 3M
