= Sebeș (Drăgan) =

- Location within Romania

Location
- Country: Romania
- Counties: Bihor County, Cluj County

Physical characteristics
- Mouth: Drăgan
  - location: Lake Drăgan
  - coordinates: 46.7898°N 22.7135°E
- Length: 16 km (9.9 mi)
- Basin size: 37 km^{2} (14 sq mi)

Basin features
- Progression: Drăgan→ Crișul Repede→ Körös→ Tisza→ Danube→ Black Sea
- Tributaries
  - right: Nieșu
- River code: III.1.44.5.3

The Sebeș is a left tributary of the river Drăgan in Romania. It discharges into the Drăgan Reservoir. Its length is 16 km (9.9 mi) and its basin size is 37 km^{2} (14 sq mi).
