= Valea Runcului River =

Valea Runcului River may refer to the following rivers in Romania:

- Valea Runcului, a tributary of the Dâmbovița in Argeș County
- Valea Runcului, a tributary of the Iad in Bihor County
