= Dobrinești =

- Location within Romania

Location
- Country: Romania
- Counties: Bihor County
- Villages: Dobricionești

Physical characteristics
- Mouth: Crișul Repede
  - location: Groși
  - coordinates: 47.0463°N 22.4515°E
- Length: 11 km (6.8 mi)
- Basin size: 47 km^{2} (18 sq mi)

Basin features
- Progression: Crișul Repede→ Körös→ Tisza→ Danube→ Black Sea

The Dobrinești is a left tributary of the river Crișul Repede in Romania. The river rises in the Izbucul Gălășeni, located on the northern part of the Ciungilor Plateau of the Pădurea Craiului Mountains. It discharges into the Crișul Repede near Aușeu. Its length is 11 km (6.8 mi) and its basin size is 47 km^{2} (18 sq mi).
