= Valea Boiului =

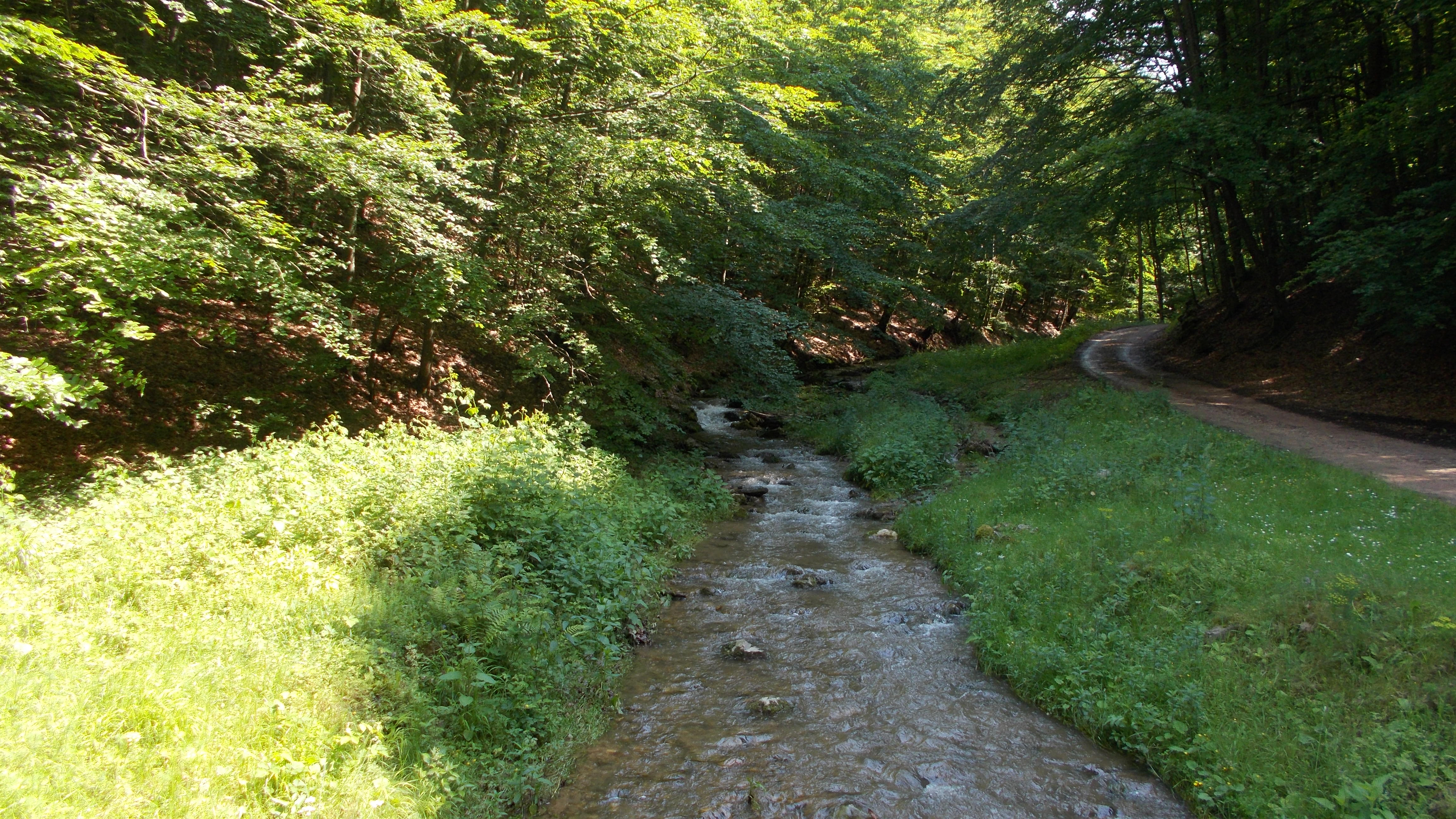

- Location within Romania

Location
- Country: Romania
- Counties: Bihor County

Physical characteristics
- Mouth: Crișul Repede
  - location: Lorău
  - coordinates: 46.9186°N 22.6189°E
- Length: 8 km (5.0 mi)
- Basin size: 21 km^{2} (8.1 sq mi)

Basin features
- Progression: Crișul Repede→ Körös→ Tisza→ Danube→ Black Sea

The Valea Boiului is a small left tributary of the river Crișul Repede in Romania. It discharges into the Crișul Repede in Lorău. Its length is 8 km (5.0 mi) and its basin size is 21 km^{2} (8.1 sq mi).
