= Husasău =

Husasău may refer to one of two places in Bihor County, Romania:

- Husasău de Tinca, a commune
- Husasău de Criş, a village in Ineu Commune
