= Mnierea =

- Location within Romania

Location
- Country: Romania
- Counties: Bihor County
- Villages: Călățea, Peștere, Chistag

Physical characteristics
- Source: Pădurea Craiului Mountains, Dealul Crucea
- Mouth: Crișul Repede
  - location: Chistag
  - coordinates: 47.0501°N 22.3499°E
- Length: 22 km (14 mi)
- Basin size: 51 km^{2} (20 sq mi)

Basin features
- Progression: Crișul Repede→ Körös→ Tisza→ Danube→ Black Sea

The Mnierea is a left tributary of the river Crișul Repede in Romania. It discharges into the Crișul Repede near Aștileu. Its length is 22 km (14 mi) and its basin size is 51 km^{2} (20 sq mi).
