= Tășad =

Tășad Valea Mare
- Location within Romania

Location
- Country: Romania
- Counties: Bihor County
- Villages: Hidișelu de Sus, Felcheriu, Alparea, Oșorhei

Physical characteristics
- Mouth: Crișul Repede
  - location: Oșorhei
  - coordinates: 47.0534°N 22.0169°E

Basin features
- Progression: Crișul Repede→ Körös→ Tisza→ Danube→ Black Sea

The Tășad (also: Valea Mare) is a left tributary of the river Crișul Repede in Romania. It discharges into the Crișul Repede in Oșorhei, near Oradea.
