= Brătcuța =

- Location within Romania

Location
- Country: Romania
- Counties: Bihor County

Physical characteristics
- Mouth: Crișul Repede
  - location: Bratca
  - coordinates: 46.9274°N 22.5842°E
- Length: 14 km (8.7 mi)
- Basin size: 37 km^{2} (14 sq mi)

Basin features
- Progression: Crișul Repede→ Körös→ Tisza→ Danube→ Black Sea

The Brătcuța is a left tributary of the river Crișul Repede in Romania. It discharges into the Crișul Repede near Bratca. Its length is 14 km (8.7 mi) and its basin size is 37 km^{2} (14 sq mi).
