= Poicu =

- Location within Romania

Location
- Country: Romania
- Counties: Cluj County

Physical characteristics
- Mouth: Crișul Repede
  - location: Ciucea
  - coordinates: 46.9521°N 22.8115°E
- Length: 14 km (8.7 mi)
- Basin size: 41 km^{2} (16 sq mi)

Basin features
- Progression: Crișul Repede→ Körös→ Tisza→ Danube→ Black Sea

The Poicu is a right tributary of the river Crișul Repede in Romania. It discharges into the Crișul Repede in Ciucea. Its length is 14 km (8.7 mi) and its basin size is 41 km^{2} (16 sq mi).
