= Beznea =

- Location within Romania

Location
- Country: Romania
- Counties: Bihor County
- Villages: Beznea, Bratca

Physical characteristics
- Mouth: Crișul Repede
  - location: Bratca
  - coordinates: 46.9284°N 22.5944°E
- Length: 9 km (5.6 mi)
- Basin size: 18 km^{2} (6.9 sq mi)

Basin features
- Progression: Crișul Repede→ Körös→ Tisza→ Danube→ Black Sea

The Beznea is a right tributary of the river Crișul Repede in Romania. It discharges into the Crișul Repede in Bratca. Its length is 9 km (5.6 mi) and its basin size is 18 km^{2} (6.9 sq mi).
