= Semeni (disambiguation) =

Semeni may refer to:

- Semeni, a river in Cluj County, Romania
- Semeni, a village in the commune Zagarancea, Ungheni District, Moldova
- semeni (Turkish) or səməni (Azerbaijani), wheat sprouts traditionally grown as part of Nowruz celebration
