= Chijic =

- Location within Romania

Location
- Country: Romania
- Counties: Bihor County
- Villages: Chijic, Borșa, Săcădat

Physical characteristics
- Mouth: Crișul Repede
  - location: Downstream of Ineu
  - coordinates: 47.0657°N 22.0971°E

Basin features
- Progression: Crișul Repede→ Körös→ Tisza→ Danube→ Black Sea

The Chijic is a left tributary of the river Crișul Repede in Romania. This tributary discharges into the Crișul Repede near Săcădat.
