= Negreni, Cluj =

Negreni
- Commune
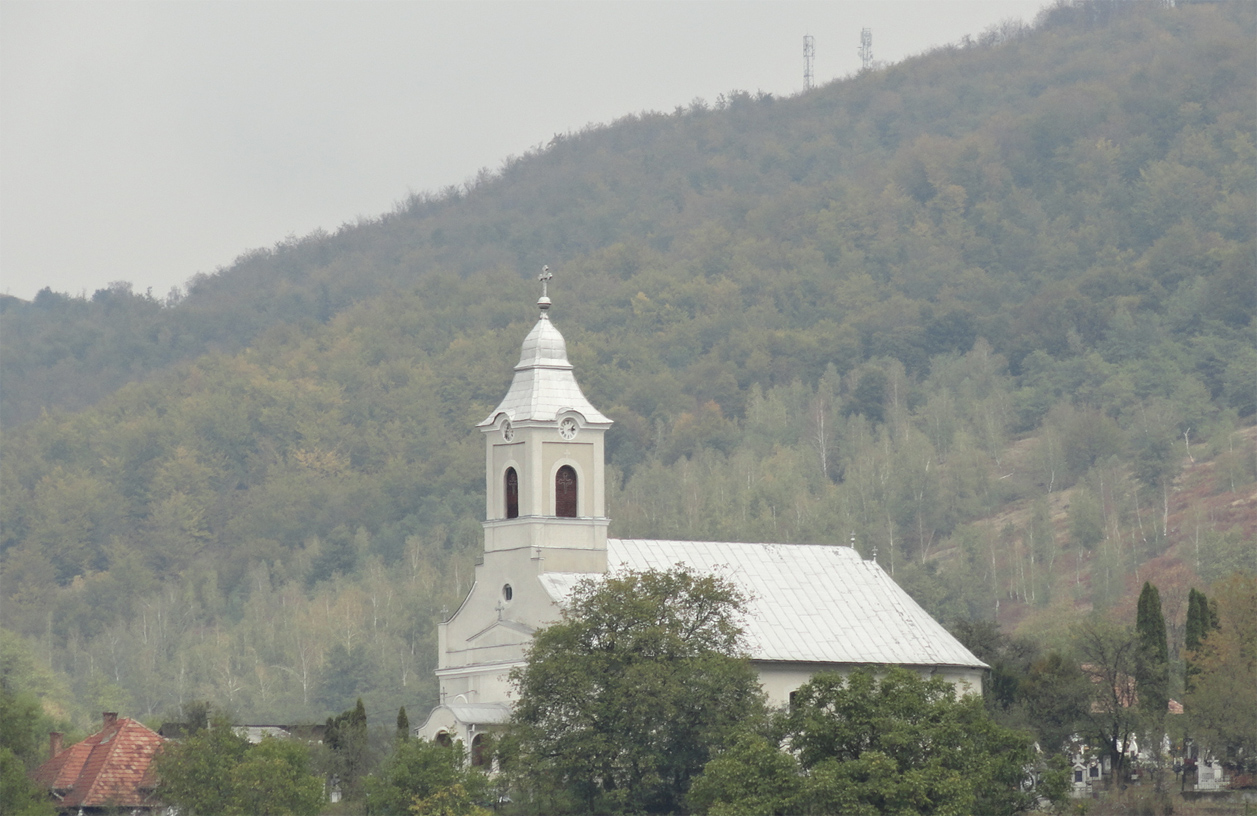
- Orthodox church in Negreni

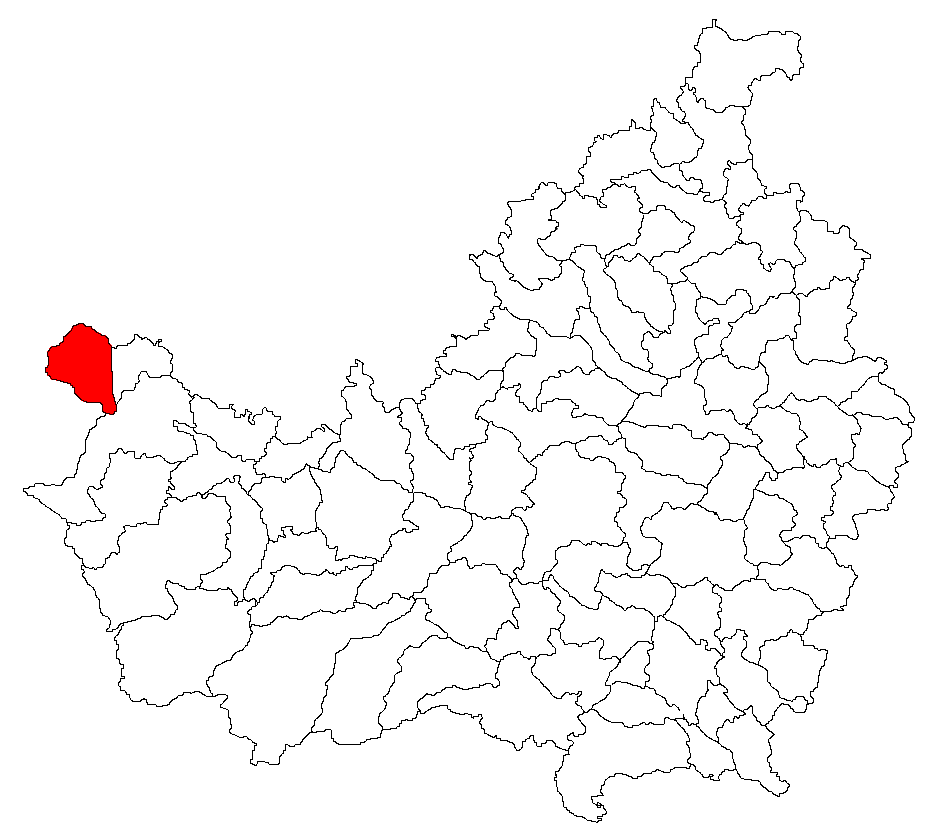
- Location in Cluj County

- Location in Romania
- Coordinates: 46°57′14″N 22°45′35″E
- Country: Romania
- County: Cluj
- Subdivisions: Bucea, Negreni, Prelucele

Government
  - Mayor (2020–2024): Dorin Constantin Manea (PNL)
- Area: 63.83 km^{2} (24.64 sq mi)
- Elevation: 425 m (1,394 ft)
- Population (2021-12-01): 2,281
  - Density: 35.74/km^{2} (92.55/sq mi)
- Time zone: UTC+02:00 (EET)
  - Summer (DST): UTC+03:00 (EEST)
- Postal code: 407440
- Area code: +(40) x64
- Vehicle reg.: CJ
- Website: primarianegreni.ro

Negreni (German: Neumarkt; Hungarian: Körösfeketetó) is a commune in Cluj County, Transylvania, Romania. It is composed of three villages: Bucea (Királyhágó), Negreni, and Prelucele (Prelak). These were part of Ciucea Commune from 1968 to 2002, when they were split off.

The commune lies on the banks of the river Crișul Repede, in a hilly region in the northern part of the Apuseni Mountains, between the Pădurea Craiului and Vlădeasa mountains to the south and the Plopiș and Meseș mountains to the north.

Negreni is located in the northwestern corner of the county, on the border with Bihor and Sălaj counties. Its neighbors are the following communes: Ciucea to the east, Bulz (Bihor) to the south, Bratca (Bihor) to the west, and Sâg (Sălaj) to the north.

National road DN1 (which runs from Bucharest to the border with Hungary) connects Negreni to the county seat, Cluj-Napoca, 80 km (50 mi) to the east and to Oradea, 78 km (48 mi) to the west. Furthermore, the Piatra Craiului train station in Bucea serves the CFR Line 300, on the segment from Huedin to Oradea.

At the 2011 census, the commune had 2,321 inhabitants; of those, 94.57% were Romanians and 2.33% Roma. At the 2021 census, Negreni had a population of 2,281, of which 96.1% were Romanians.

For centuries, a fair has been held in Negreni, on the banks of the Crișul Repede, during the first week of October; in 2020 and 2021, the fair was cancelled, due to COVID-19.
