= Alexandru Roman =

Romanian academic

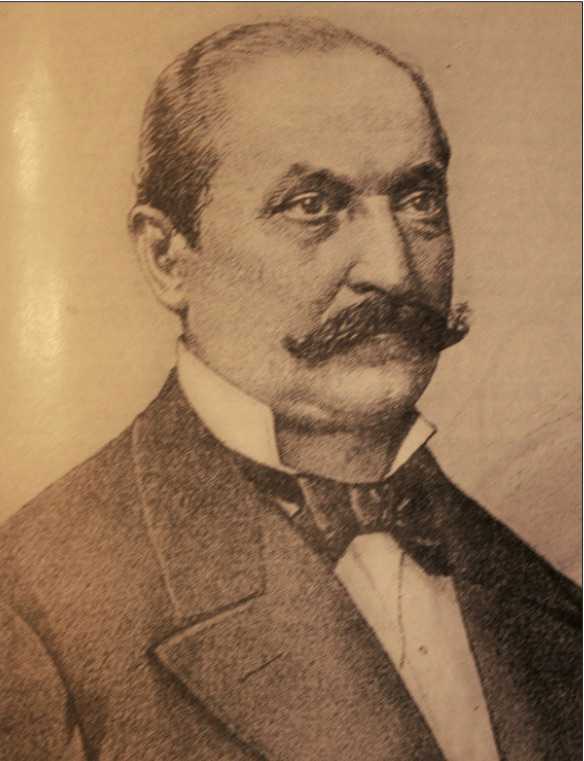
Alexandru Roman

Alexandru Roman (November 26, 1826 – September 27, 1897) was an Austro-Hungarian ethnic Romanian cultural figure and journalist, as well as a founding member of the Romanian Academy.

Born in Aușeu, Bihor County, in the Crișana region, he attended primary and secondary school at Beiuș and Oradea. He then studied philosophy, mathematics and theology at the University of Vienna. After graduation, Roman returned to his home region and was hired at the Romanian gymnasium in Beiuș in 1849, during the Hungarian Revolution. He became the first teacher to hold classes in Romanian. In 1851, he became a Romanian-language professor at the Oradea law academy. In 1862, following numerous petitions, he began teaching Romanian at the Royal University of Pest, founding the Romanian language and literature department. He prepared a Romanian-language manual for village schools, and contributed articles on philology and politics to Bucovina, Gazeta Transilvaniei and Naționalul, the last based in Bucharest, capital of the nascent Romanian state.

In 1866, Roman became a founding member of the Romanian Literary Society, later the Romanian Academy. He also helped found the Reading Society of Studious Romanian Youth (1851) and the Petru Maior Society (1862). He edited the gazettes Concordia (founded at Budapest in 1861 in collaboration with Sigismund Pap, until 1866) and Federațiunea (1868-1876), which he also founded at Budapest. Roman published unusually virulent articles in these organs, causing him to be brought to trial a number of times. The culmination came in 1868, when he reprinted the Blaj Pronouncement. As a result, he was sentenced to a year's imprisonment at Vác.

From 1865 to 1888, Roman sat in the House of Representatives at Budapest, where he advocated on behalf of the Romanians of Transylvania and Hungary. He died in Sebeș.
