= Misir =

Misir Mișid
- Location within Romania

Location
- Country: Romania
- Counties: Bihor County

Physical characteristics
- Mouth: Crișul Repede
  - location: Upstream of Șuncuiuș
  - coordinates: 46.9346°N 22.5454°E
- Length: 11 km (6.8 mi)
- Basin size: 32 km^{2} (12 sq mi)

Basin features
- Progression: Crișul Repede→ Körös→ Tisza→ Danube→ Black Sea
- Tributaries
  - left: Valea Făgetului

The Misir or Mișid is a left tributary of the river Crișul Repede in Romania. It discharges into the Crișul Repede near Șuncuiuș. Its length is 11 km (6.8 mi) and its basin size is 32 km^{2} (12 sq mi).
