= Adona (river) =

River in Bihor, Romania

- Location within Romania

Location
- Country: Romania
- Counties: Bihor County
- Villages: Cordău, Sânmartin, Oradea

Physical characteristics
- Mouth: Peța
  - location: Oradea
  - coordinates: 47.0391°N 21.9393°E

Basin features
- Progression: Peța→ Crișul Repede→ Körös→ Tisza→ Danube→ Black Sea
- River code: III.1.44.30.2

The Adona is a tributary of the river Peța in Romania. It flows into the Peța in Oradea.
