= Drăgănescu =

Drăgănescu may refer to:

- Drăgănescu, a village in Mihăilești town, Giurgiu County
- Constantin Drăgănescu (1936–2020), Romanian actor
- Lidia Drăgănescu (born 1967), Romanian handball player
- Mihai Drăgănescu (1929–2010), Romanian engineer
- Mugurel Drăgănescu (born 1976), Romanian football referee

== See also ==
- Drăgan (disambiguation)
