= Apa, Satu Mare =

Apa
- Commune
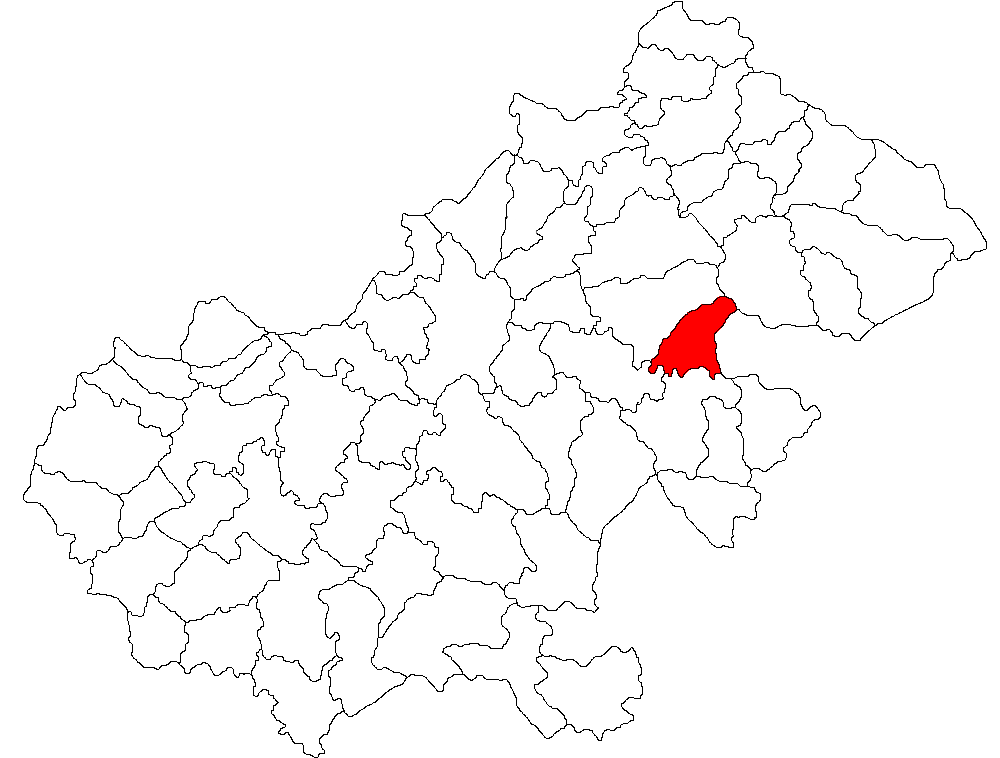
- Location in Satu Mare County

- Location in Romania
- Coordinates: 47°46′N 23°12′E
- Country: Romania
- County: Satu Mare
- Area: 45.03 km^{2} (17.39 sq mi)
- Population (2021-12-01): 2,534
  - Density: 56/km^{2} (150/sq mi)
- Time zone: EET/EEST (UTC+2/+3)
- Vehicle reg.: SM

Apa (Hungarian: Apa, Hungarian pronunciation: [ˈɒpɒ]) is a commune of 2,575 inhabitants situated in Satu Mare County, Romania. It is composed of three villages: Apa, Lunca Apei (Apai Lanka) and Someșeni (Szamostelek).

A famous Bronze Age hoard was discovered in Apa, including swords which are known as Hajdúsámson-Apa swords, after their two type-sites (see Wietenberg culture).

== Natives ==
- Vasile Lucaciu
