= Vasile Lucaciu =

Romanian priest and activist (1852–1922)

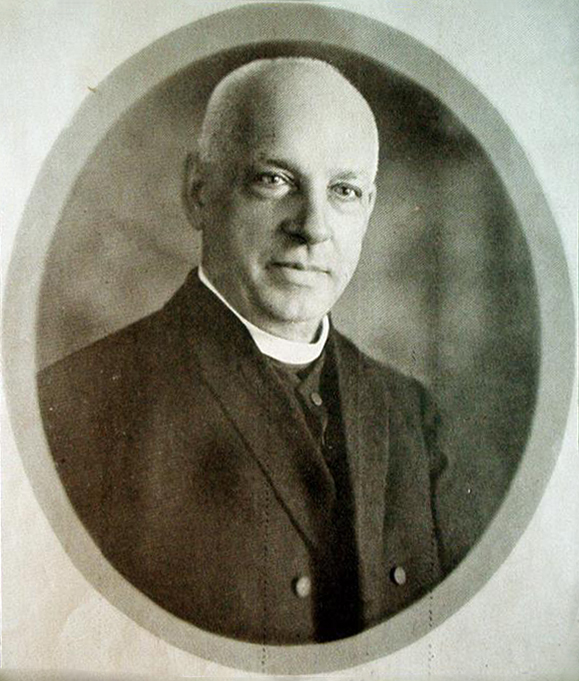
- Photo from the collection of the History and Archaeology Museum, Satu Mare
- Born: 21 January 1852; Apa, Szatmár, Austria-Hungary
- Died: 29 November 1922 (aged 70); Satu Mare, Kingdom of Romania
- Resting place: Șișești, Maramureș County, Romania
- Occupations: Priest, politician
- Known for: Journalistic activity

Ecclesiastical career
- Religion: Greek Catholic

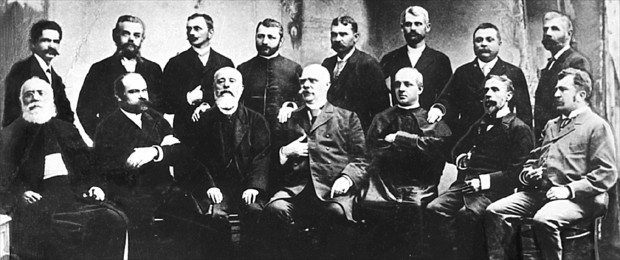
Vasile Lucaciu (fifth from the left, bottom row) with the other co-signers of the Transylvanian Memorandum

Vasile Lucaciu (January 21, 1852 – November 29, 1922) was a Romanian Greek-Catholic priest and an advocate of equal rights of Romanians with the Hungarians in Transylvania.

== Biography ==
Vasile Lucaci was born in Apa, Szatmár County, the son of Mihai Lucaciu and Iuliana Toth. He went to school in his native village and then attended gymnasium in Baia Mare. For high school, he first went to Uzhhorod and then to the Jesuit school in Oradea.

His parish was in Șișești, Maramureș where he built a school and a church.

Lucaciu was a member of the National Romanian Party and a co-author of the Transylvanian Memorandum (1892). As a consequence, Vasile Lucaciu was tried for "homeland betrayal" in Kolozsvár/Cluj in May 1894 and sentenced to five years in prison. However he was released after one year. During this period, the song “Doina lui Lucaciu” was dedicated to him.

In 1905, he was elected deputy for the Belényes/Beiuș constituency in the Hungarian Parliament.

In March 1917, Vasile Lucaciu was a member of a group of exiled Romanian Habsburg subjects who were sent as a delegation to the United States to campaign for Romania's cause. He died in 1922 in Satu Mare and was buried in Șișești.

Lucaciu is also known as the "Lion of Șișești". People can visit today his memorial house in Șișești, as well as the school, both being now museums.

The Vasile Lucaciu National College in Baia Mare is named after him. A boulevard in Satu Mare and streets in Baia Mare, Bucharest, Ploiești, and Timișoara also bear his name.
