= Aștileu =

- Commune
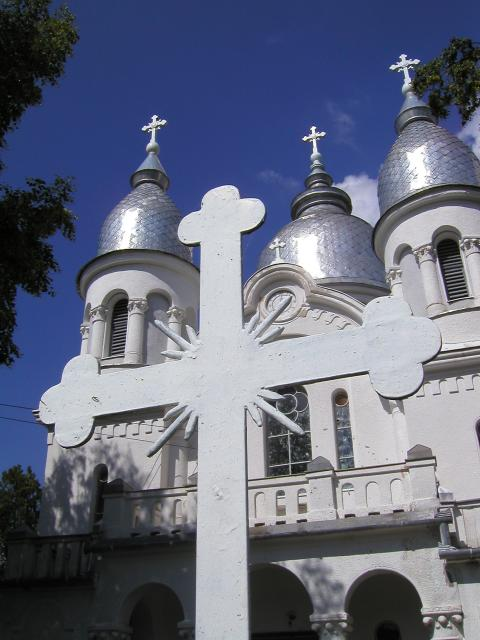
- Orthodox church in Aștileu

- Location in Bihor County

- Location in Romania
- Coordinates: 47°2′N 22°23′E
- Country: Romania
- County: Bihor

Government
  - Mayor (2024–2028): Vasile-Ionuț Lazăr (PNL)
- Area: 58.8 km^{2} (22.7 sq mi)
- Elevation: 229 m (751 ft)
- Population (2021-12-01): 3,134
  - Density: 53.3/km^{2} (138/sq mi)
- Time zone: UTC+02:00 (EET)
  - Summer (DST): UTC+03:00 (EEST)
- Postal code: 417020
- Area code: +(40) x59
- Vehicle reg.: BH
- Website: www.primaria-astileu.ro

Aștileu (Hungarian: Esküllő) is a commune in Bihor County, Crișana, Romania. It is composed of four villages: Aștileu, Călățea (Kalota), Chistag (Keszteg), and Peștere (Körösbarlang).

The commune is located in the central part of the county, 42 km (26 mi) east of the county seat, Oradea, and 54 km (34 mi) from the border with Hungary. The closest town to Aștileu is Aleșd, on the opposite bank of the Crișul Repede. There is a small church. Aștileu is located on the Aleșd–Beiuș route. The Vadu Crișului – Aștileu Canal supplies water to the Aștileu hydroelectric plant, with an installed capacity of 2.8 MW.

== Population ==
Historical population
Year	Pop.	±%
1880	1,933	—
1890	2,357	+21.9%
1900	2,682	+13.8%
1910	3,269	+21.9%
1920	3,243	−0.8%
1930	3,398	+4.8%
1941	3,421	+0.7%
1956	4,070	+19.0%
1966	4,344	+6.7%
1977	4,144	−4.6%
1992	4,003	−3.4%
2002	3,791	−5.3%
2011	3,561	−6.1%
2021	3,134	−12.0%
Source: Census data

At the 2011 census, the commune had a population of 3,561; of those, 87.94% were Romanians, 5.2% Roma, 4.48% Slovaks, 1.55% Hungarians, and 0.23% Germans. At the 2021 census, Aștileu had a population of 3,134; of those, 89.76% were Romanians and 3.8% Slovaks.
