= Semeni =

- Location within Romania

Location
- Country: Romania
- Counties: Cluj County

Physical characteristics
- Mouth: Crișul Repede
  - location: Negreni
  - coordinates: 46.9494°N 22.7794°E
- Length: 9.7 km (6.0 mi)
- Basin size: 29 km^{2} (11 sq mi)

Basin features
- Progression: Crișul Repede→ Körös→ Tisza→ Danube→ Black Sea

The Semeni is a right tributary of the river Crișul Repede in Romania. It discharges into the Crișul Repede near Negreni. Its length is 10 km (6.2 mi) and its basin size is 29 km^{2} (11 sq mi).
