= Ioana Mihăilă =

Romanian politician

Minister of Health
- In office 21 April 2021 – 6 September 2021
- Prime Minister: Florin Cîțu
- Preceded by: Florin Cîțu (acting)

State secretary in the Ministry of Health
- In office 1 February 2021 – 21 April 2021

Personal details
- Born: 20 November 1980 (age 45)
- Party: PNL (2013–2018); PLUS (2018–2021); USR PLUS (Note: The Bucharest Court of Appeal (Romanian: Curtea de Apel București) approved the merger through absorption between USR and PLUS on 16 April 2021 definitively, that was submitted on 30 October 2020. The two parties held a joint congress where the merger was approved with 84.65% favorable votes.) (2021–2022); USR (2022); REPER (2022–present)
- Education: Iuliu Hațieganu University of Medicine and Pharmacy (1999–2005)

Ioana Mihăilă (born 20 November 1980) is a Romanian politician and endocrinologist from USR PLUS, who has been the Minister of Health of Romania since 21 April 2021. Being specialized in endocrinology since 2010, she is a member of the Romanian Endocrinology Society (Romanian: Societatea Română de Endocrinologie).

She spent her childhood in a small village from Lăzăreni, Bihor County; moved to Cluj-Napoca in 1999 and studied at the Iuliu Hațieganu University of Medicine and Pharmacy between 1999 and 2005.

She has been a member of USR PLUS since 26 October 2018 and was appointed as secretary of state in the Ministry of Health by incumbent Prime Minister Florin Cîțu, being proposed by USR PLUS for the position of Minister of Health on 21 April 2021. On the same day, the President of Romania, Klaus Iohannis, appointed her to become the Minister of Health of Romania.

== Biography ==
Ioana Mihăilă was born on 20 November 1980, spending her childhood in a small village from Lăzăreni, Bihor County. She moved to Cluj-Napoca in 1999. She studied at the Mihai Eminescu National College of Oradea. Between 1999 and 2005, she studied at the Iuliu Hațieganu University of Medicine and Pharmacy of Cluj-Napoca, being licensed in general medicine. In 2008, she got her certificate in endocrine sonography at the Grigore T. Popa University of Medicine and Pharmacy of Iași, and she became specialized in endocrinology after preparing in residency at the Endocrinology Clinic of the County Emergency Hospital of Cluj-Napoca (Romanian: Clinica de Endocrinologie a Spitalului Clinic Județean din Cluj-Napoca) between 2006 and 2010.

Mihăilă is a member of the Romanian Endocrinology Society (Romanian: Societatea Română de Endocrinologie) and speaks English and French. She also is an endocrinologist, is married and has two children with her husband. She joined the Freedom, Unity and Solidarity Party (PLUS) when it got founded on 26 October 2018 and was elected president of PLUS Bihor. In 2020, she ran for the city hall of Oradea on behalf of the USR-PLUS Alliance. As of 2021, she owns three houses in Oradea, three urban patches of land in Oradea, an apartment in Cluj-Napoca, a commercial property in Oradea, a car, and over 400,000 lei in her bank accounts. In 2020, she gave the Save Romania Union (USR) a loan worth of 20,000 lei for an election campaign.

On 1 February 2021, Prime Minister of Romania Florin Cîțu appointed her to be a state secretary in the Ministry of Health. Two months later, on 14 April 2021, Cîțu fires Minister of Health Vlad Voiculescu. On 21 April 2021, USR PLUS proposes her to become Minister of Health, to replace Vlad Voiculescu, with President Klaus Iohannis appointing her on the same day. In her first press conference as minister of health, she said her term will have three priorities along handling the COVID-19 pandemic: attracting European funds in the health sector, making basic medical services more accessible and reforming the management of hospitals and health services.
