= Alceu (river) =

- Location within Romania

Location
- Country: Romania
- Counties: Bihor County
- Villages: Livada de Bihor

Physical characteristics
- Mouth: Crișul Repede
  - location: Toboliu
  - coordinates: 47.0307°N 21.6942°E
- Length: 20 km (12 mi)

Basin features
- Progression: Crișul Repede→ Körös→ Tisza→ Danube→ Black Sea

The Alceu is a left tributary of the river Crișul Repede in Romania. It discharges into the Crișul Repede in Toboliu. Its length is 20 km (12 mi).
