= Domoș =

- Location within Romania

Location
- Country: Romania
- Counties: Cluj County
- Villages: Huedin

Physical characteristics
- Mouth: Crișul Repede
  - location: Huedin
  - coordinates: 46.8659°N 23.0294°E
- Length: 12 km (7.5 mi)
- Basin size: 27 km^{2} (10 sq mi)

Basin features
- Progression: Crișul Repede→ Körös→ Tisza→ Danube→ Black Sea

The Domoș (Hungarian: Dámos) is a left tributary of the Crișul Repede in Romania. It flows into the Crișul Repede in Huedin. Its length is 12 km (7.5 mi) and its basin size is 27 km^{2} (10 sq mi).
