= Vasile Lucaciu National College =

Public day school in Baia Mare, Romania

- Colegiul Naţional Vasile Lucaciu
- Strada Culturii nr.2 Baia Mare, Maramureș; Romania

Information
- School type: Public, Day school
- Motto: Traditio. Ingenium. Ars docendi.
- Religious affiliation: Orthodox
- Established: 1962
- Principal: Camelia Bogdan
- Age range: 10-19
- Language: Romanian
- Colours: Blue and White
- Website: lucaciu.ro

Vasile Lucaciu National College (Romanian: Colegiul Naţional Vasile Lucaciu) is a public day school for students aged 10 to 19 that was established in 1962. Located in Baia Mare, Romania, the college is named after Vasile Lucaciu, a Greek Catholic priest and advocate.

It includes a gymnasium facility, as well as a high school.

== Former names ==
- Medium School No. 3 (Romanian: Şcoala Medie Nr. 3) between 1962 and 1965
- High School No. 3 (Romanian: Liceul Nr. 3) between 1965 and 1971
- High School Mathematics and Physics No. 1 (Romanian: Liceul de Matematică - Fizică Nr. 1) between 1971 and 1982
- Industrial High School No. 8 (Romanian: Liceul Industrial Nr. 8) between 1982 and 1990
- Vasile Lucaciu High School (Romanian: Liceul Vasile Lucaciu) between 1990 and 1999
- Vasile Lucaciu National College (Romanian: Colegiul Naţional Vasile Lucaciu) since 1999
