= Pârâul Omului =

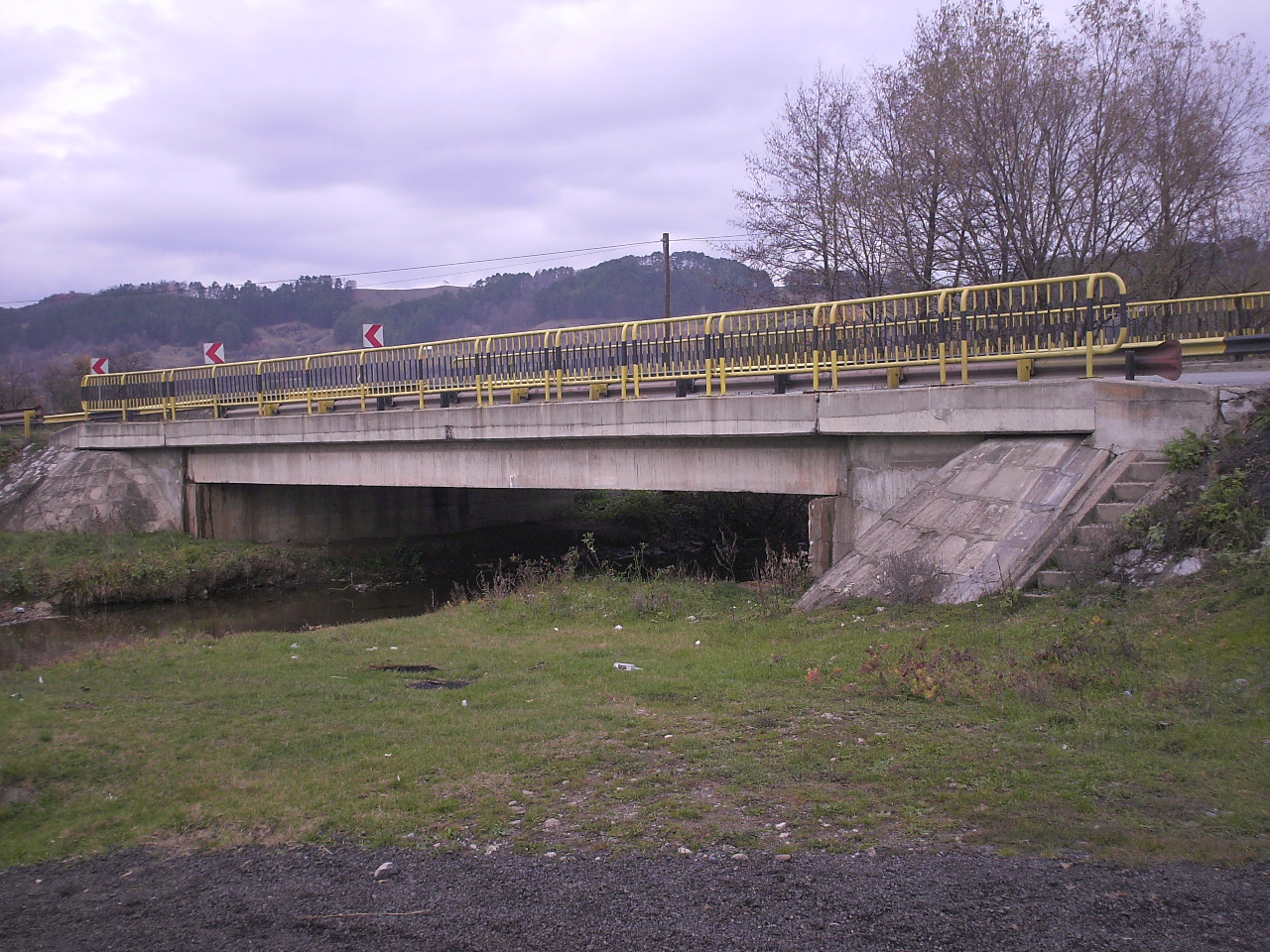

- Location within Romania

Location
- Country: Romania
- Counties: Bihor County
- Villages: Luncșoara, Aușeu

Physical characteristics
- Mouth: Crișul Repede
  - location: Aușeu
  - coordinates: 47.0382°N 22.4793°E
- Length: 10 km (6.2 mi)
- Basin size: 43 km^{2} (17 sq mi)

Basin features
- Progression: Crișul Repede→ Körös→ Tisza→ Danube→ Black Sea
- Tributaries
  - left: Răchițeasca

The Pârâul Omului is a right tributary of the river Crișul Repede in Romania. It discharges into the Crișul Repede in Aușeu. Its length is 10 km (6.2 mi) and its basin size is 43 km^{2} (17 sq mi).
