= Gepiș =

- Location within Romania

Location
- Country: Romania
- Counties: Bihor County
- Villages: Groși

Physical characteristics
- Source: Mount Văratec
  - location: Plopiș Mountains
- Mouth: Crișul Repede
  - location: Groși
  - coordinates: 47.0423°N 22.4713°E
- Length: 9 km (5.6 mi)
- Basin size: 23 km^{2} (8.9 sq mi)

Basin features
- Progression: Crișul Repede→ Körös→ Tisza→ Danube→ Black Sea

The Gepiș is a right tributary of the river Crișul Repede in Romania. It discharges into the Crișul Repede in Groși. Its length is 9 km (5.6 mi) and its basin size is 23 km^{2} (8.9 sq mi).
