= Battle of Ciucea =

Battle

- Part of the Hungarian–Romanian War
Date	16–29 January 1919
Location	Ciucea, Romania
Result	Limiting the advance of Romanian troops to the west

Belligerents
Hungarian Republic	Romania

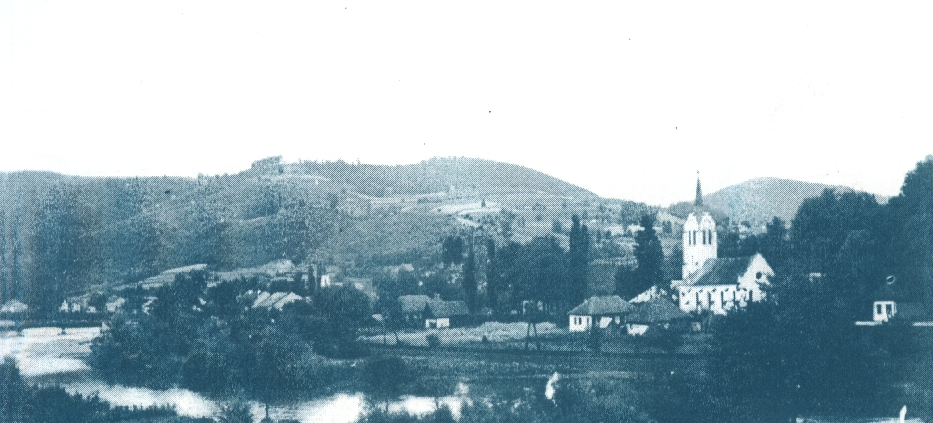
Ciucea in 1938, Cluj Country, Romania

The Battle of Ciucea from January 16–29, 1919 was a tactical-level military engagement fought between Ciucea and Huedin located in Cluj county, Hungarian troops from the Romanian "Secuian Division". The course of hostilities was circumscribed military operations for the defense of the Great Union (1918–1920), the action taking place during the Operation of the Romanian Army to occupy the line of demarcation from Transylvania (1918) of the period of occupation of the Line of demarcation in Transylvania (1918–1919) of the third alignment of the line of demarcation in Transylvania. The actions carried out on this occasion contributed to the establishment of the military demarcation alignment in the Bihor mountains.

The reason for the confrontation was for the control of the access road to the Ciucea pass, a major pass which gave access to Transylvania. Having retreated from the area of Cluj, the "21st Honvezi Infantry Regiment" acted defensively in accordance with the change of view of the Hungarian political and military administration. They were now willing to take military measures for the purpose of gaining time.

Putting the Hungarian troops in defense at Ciucea allowed them, later, to have serious engineering works in the area in front of the Romanian Army Offensive of April 1919.

== Geographical, political, and military context ==
Pasul Ciucea represents a crossing point between Transylvania proper and Crișana, roads that cross the pass connecting the localities of Oradea and Cluj. In a historical and cultural sense, it represented one of the major passes through which access to Transylvania was achieved during medieval times. It was the most used crossing route between the Hungarian Great Plain and the Transylvania Basin. Following the efforts of the Government of Romania and the governing council of Transylvania, Banat, and the Romanian lands in Hungary, the demarcation line was moved in January 1919 on the west alignment of Sighetu Marmații – Cicârlău, Maramureș – Ardusat – Băsești – Chilioara – Crișeni – Panic – Aghireș – Meseșeni de Sus – Şeredei – Pria – Ciucea – Ciuci – Zam. The Romanian armed forces thus continued to slowly press forward, after securing Cluj. The troops of the "Secuiesti Division" withdrew from the Cluj area, leaving only smaller formations of the "21 Honvezi Infantry Regiment" from Cluj, who had the mission of securing the road to Oradea for the period of ammunition transport.

After the arrest on 17 January 1919 of Professor István Apáthy by the Romanians, and in the context of the continuation of the advance by the Romanian troops, the Hungarian command headed by Károly Kratochwill initially moved to Huedin and then to Oradea, where he transferred his command center in mid-January. However, the Hungarian command claimed that no recognizes as a line of demarcation than the Armistice of Villa Giusti, as it had been confirmed and individualized by the Belgrade Military Convention of November 13, 1918. From Oradea, Kratochwill thus ordered that the Hungarian troops would not withdraw, even if the Romanian army had continued to advance westward. In the context of this order, the first military confrontations between the two armies also appeared.

The policy of passive non-resistance developed during the winter of 1918–1919 by the Hungarian government did not deter Kratochvil, and the soldiers of the "Szechusian Division" undermined the official policy by a warlike attitude. Thus, the commander of the "Secuiesti Division" was proactive, ordering missions to cross the Romanian lines. The colonel and his subordinates were of the opinion that armed resistance was the only way forward to preserve the territories located on the periphery of Hungarian territory, an opinion shared by many of their contemporaries of the same language in those areas.

According to the general of the French Louis Franchet d'Esperey, the ultimate aim of the Romanians was to occupy the territories located in the southeast of the Tisa River, in accordance with those recorded in the Alliance Treaty between Romania and the Entente. Consequently, the French general estimated that a Romanian-Hungarian war was imminent.

== Sources ==
- Știrban, Marcel; Iancu, Gheorghe; Țepelea, Ioan; Racovițan, Mihai; Cap. IV Unirea și desăvârșirea statului național unitar (arhivat) în Istoria României. Transilvania, Vol. II; Ed. Gheorghe Barițiu; Cluj-Napoca; 1997; pp. 617–840; p. 97–98 PDF; accesat la 1 August 2018
- (in English) Helmick, Timothy; Regaining the Homeland: How middle-class soldiers and officers came to fight for Károly and Kun ; Central European University, History Department; Budapest, Hungary; 2012; accesat la 1 August 2018
