= Drăganu (disambiguation) =

Drăganu may refer to one of several entities in Romania:

- Drăganu, a commune in Argeș County
- Drăganu, a village in Valea Mare Commune, Vâlcea County
- Nicolae Drăganu, linguist
- Tudor Drăganu, jurist, son of Nicolae
