= Iad (river) =

Iad Iada
- Location within Romania

Location
- Country: Romania
- Counties: Bihor County
- Villages: Remeți, Munteni, Bulz

Physical characteristics
- Mouth: Crișul Repede
  - location: Bulz
  - coordinates: 46°55′25″N 22°39′01″E
- Length: 46 km (29 mi)
- Basin size: 220 km^{2} (85 sq mi)

Basin features
- Progression: Crișul Repede→ Körös→ Tisza→ Danube→ Black Sea

The Iad (also: Iada) is a left tributary of the river Crișul Repede in Romania. It discharges into the Crișul Repede near Bulz. Its length is 46 km (29 mi) and its basin size is 220 km^{2} (85 sq mi).

== Tributaries ==
The following rivers are tributaries to the Iad:

- Left: Leșu
- Right: Cârligate, Valea Runcului, Guga, Valea Lupului, Dașor, Sărăcel
