= Peța =

River in Bihor, Romania

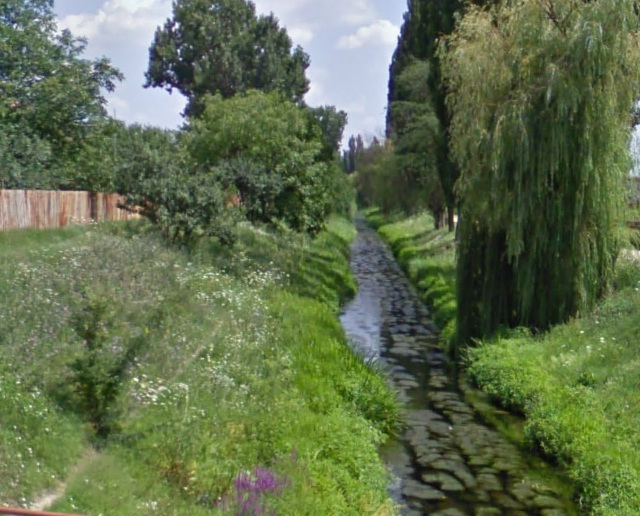

- Location within Romania

Location
- Country: Romania
- Counties: Bihor County
- Villages: Betfia, Sânmartin, Oradea

Physical characteristics
- Mouth: Crișul Repede
  - location: Sântandrei
  - coordinates: 47.0796°N 21.8192°E

Basin features
- Progression: Crișul Repede→ Körös→ Tisza→ Danube→ Black Sea
- Tributaries
  - left: Hidișel, Adona

The Peța (Hungarian: Pece-patak) is a left tributary of the river Crișul Repede in Romania. It discharges into the Crișul Repede in Sântandrei, west of Oradea. Its length is 21 km (13 mi).
