= Sărand =

- Location within Romania

Location
- Country: Romania
- Counties: Bihor County
- Villages: Sărand

Physical characteristics
- Mouth: Crișul Repede
  - location: Upstream of Fughiu
  - coordinates: 47.0666°N 22.0774°E

Basin features
- Progression: Crișul Repede→ Körös→ Tisza→ Danube→ Black Sea
- Tributaries
  - right: Valea Domnilor

The Sărand is a left tributary of the river Crișul Repede in Romania. It discharges into the Crișul Repede near Fughiu.
