= Aurel Drăgan =

Romanian volleyball player

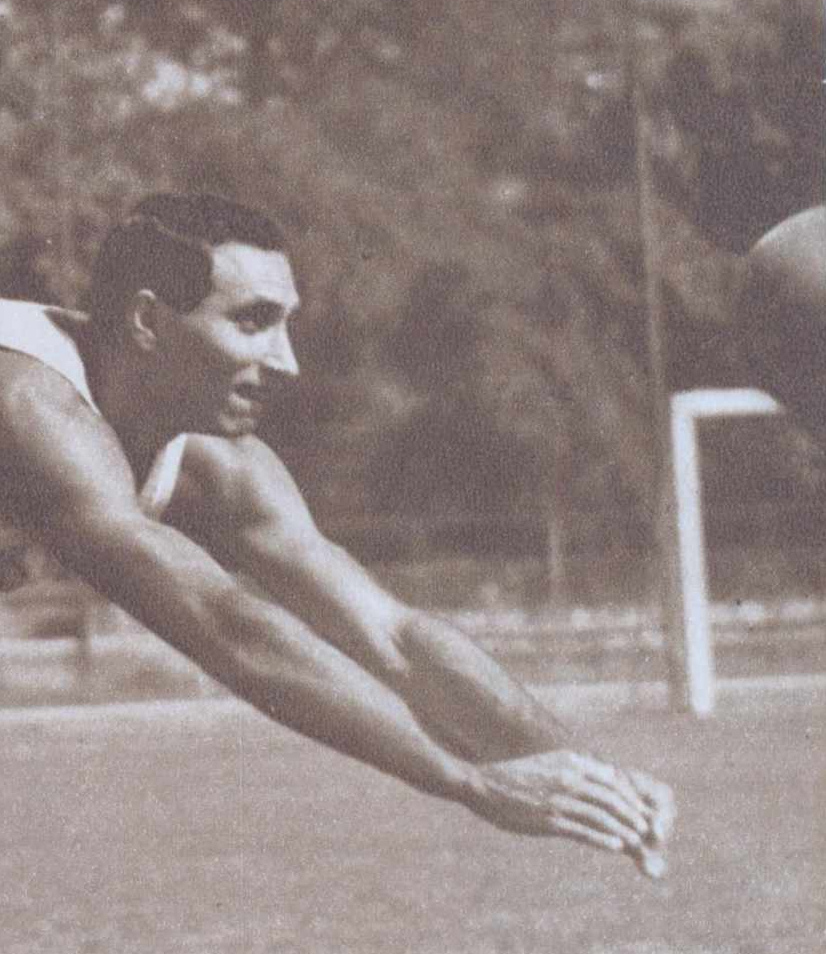
- Drăgan in 1963

Personal information
- Nationality: Romanian
- Born: 2 November 1938 (age 87) Hunia, Romania

Sport
- Sport: Volleyball

Aurel Drăgan (born 2 November 1938) is a Romanian volleyball player. He competed in the men's tournament at the 1964 Summer Olympics.
