= Sorond =

Sorond or Sarand (Persian: سرند) may refer to:

- Sarand, East Azerbaijan
- Sarand, Boshruyeh, South Khorasan Province
- Sarand, Ferdows, South Khorasan Province
- Sorond, Tabas, South Khorasan Province
