= Țețchea =

- Commune
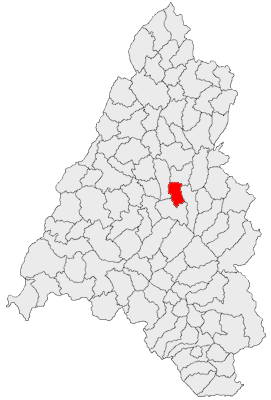
- Location in Bihor County

- Location in Romania
- Coordinates: 47°3′N 22°19′E
- Country: Romania
- County: Bihor
- Area: 51.14 km^{2} (19.75 sq mi)
- Population (2021-12-01): 3,376
  - Density: 66.01/km^{2} (171.0/sq mi)
- Time zone: UTC+02:00 (EET)
  - Summer (DST): UTC+03:00 (EEST)
- Vehicle reg.: BH

Țețchea (Hungarian: Cécke) is a commune in Bihor County, Crișana, Romania with a population of 3,141 people. It is composed of four villages: Hotar (Izsópallaga), Subpiatră (Kőalja), Telechiu (Mezőtelki) and Țețchea.
