= Drăgan (Crișul Repede) =

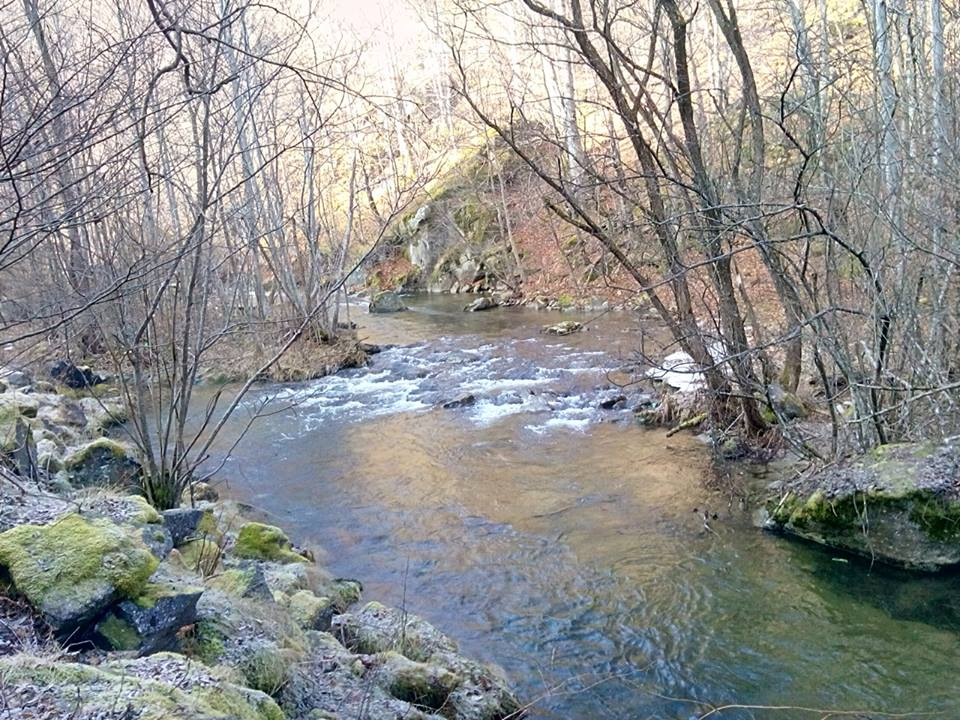

- Location within Romania

Location
- Country: Romania
- Counties: Bihor, Cluj
- Villages: Lunca Vișagului, Valea Drăganului

Physical characteristics
- Mouth: Crișul Repede
  - location: Valea Drăganului
  - coordinates: 46.9350°N 22.8328°E
- Length: 42 km (26 mi)
- Basin size: 254 km^{2} (98 sq mi)

Basin features
- Progression: Crișul Repede→ Körös→ Tisza→ Danube→ Black Sea

The Drăgan is a left tributary of the river Crișul Repede in Romania. It discharges into the Crișul Repede near Valea Drăganului. Its length is 42 km (26 mi) and its basin size is 254 km^{2} (98 sq mi).

== Tributaries ==
The following rivers are tributaries to the Drăgan:

- Left: Ciripa, Chențu, Sebeș, Valea Lunga
- Right: Moara Dracului, Buteasa, Crăciun, Zârna, Dara, Valea Bulzurilor
