= Lăzăreni =

- Commune
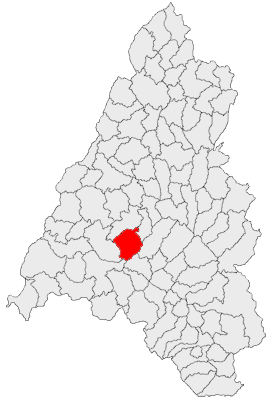
- Location in Bihor County

- Location in Romania
- Coordinates: 46°52′N 22°4′E
- Country: Romania
- County: Bihor
- Population (2021-12-01): 3,510
- Time zone: UTC+02:00 (EET)
  - Summer (DST): UTC+03:00 (EEST)
- Vehicle reg.: BH

Lăzăreni (Hungarian: Miklóirtás) is a commune in Bihor County, Crișana, Romania with a population of 3,510 people (2021). It is composed of eight villages: Bicăcel (Pusztabikács), Calea Mare (Magyargyepes), Cărăndeni (Nagykáránd), Cărănzel (Kiskáránd), Gepiș (Oláhgyepes), Gruilung (Hosszúliget), Lăzăreni, and Miheleu (Méhelő).

== Natives ==
- Dumitru Cuc (1928–2019), wrestler
- Ioana Mihăilă (born 1980, politician
