= Bulz =

- Commune
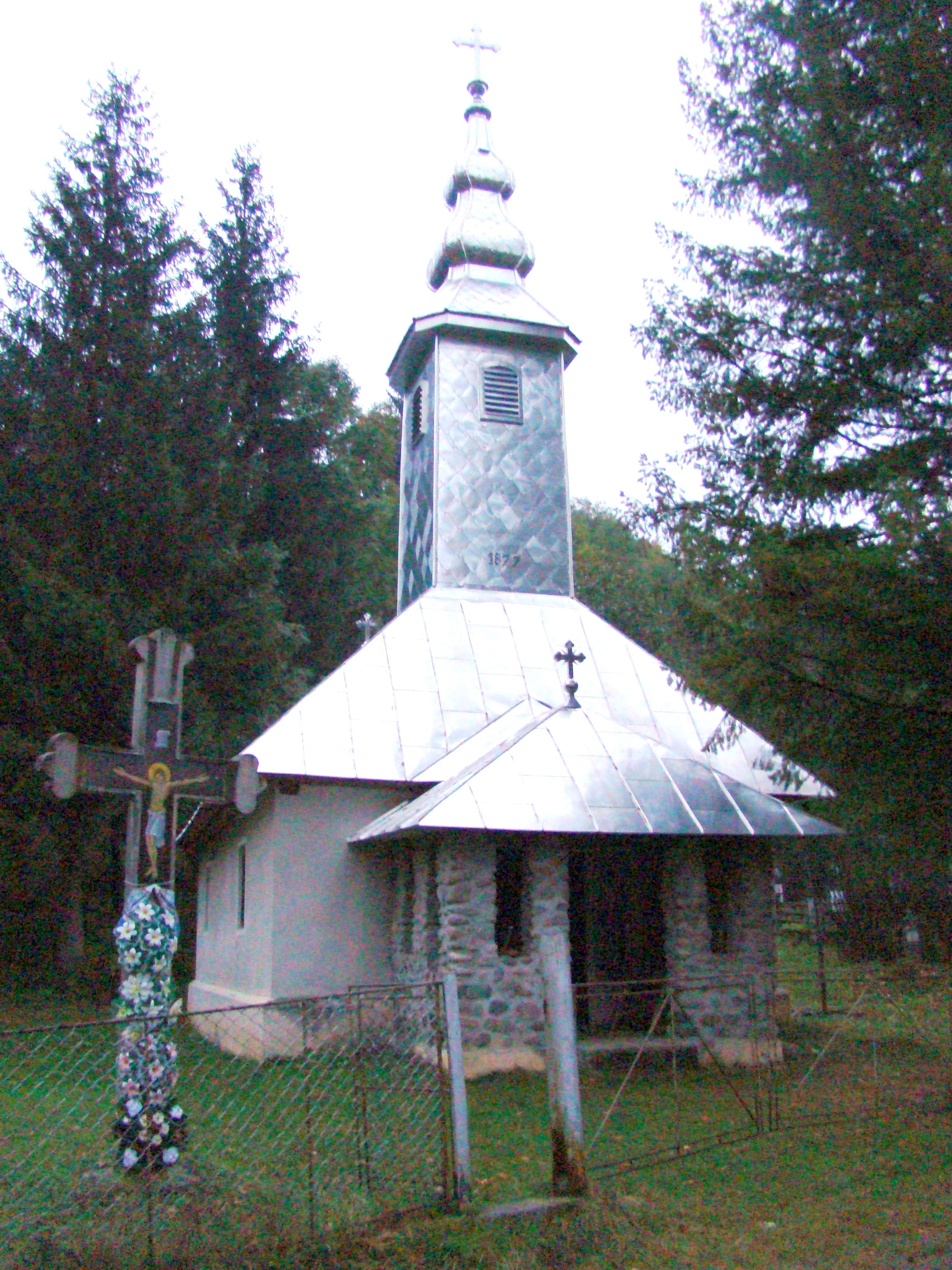
- Wooden church in Remeți

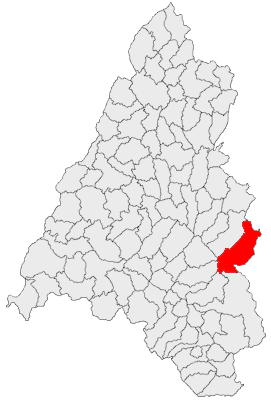
- Location in Bihor County

- Location in Romania
- Coordinates: 46.90°N 22.70°E
- Country: Romania
- County: Bihor

Government
  - Mayor (2020–2024): Augustin Sărăcuț (PSD)
- Area: 99.39 km^{2} (38.37 sq mi)
- Elevation: 369 m (1,211 ft)
- Population (2021-12-01): 1,903
  - Density: 19.15/km^{2} (49.59/sq mi)
- Time zone: UTC+02:00 (EET)
  - Summer (DST): UTC+03:00 (EEST)
- Postal code: 417110
- Area code: +(40) x59
- Vehicle reg.: BH
- Website: comunabulz.ro

Bulz (Hungarian: Csarnóháza, German: Grünfeld) is a commune in Bihor County, Crișana, Romania with a population of 1,903 as of 2021. It is composed of three villages: Bulz, Munteni, and Remeți (Jádremete).

The commune is situated on the northern slopes of the Pădurea Craiului Mountains, at an altitude of 369 m (1,211 ft), on the banks of the river Crișul Repede and its tributary, the river Iad. It is located in the eastern part of Bihor County, 70 km (43 mi) from the county seat, Oradea, on the border with Cluj County. The Bulz train station serves the CFR Main Line 300, which connects Bucharest to Oradea.
