= Săcădat =

- Commune
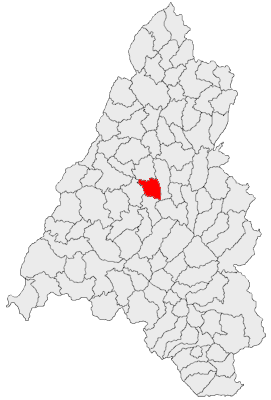
- Location in Bihor County

- Location in Romania
- Coordinates: 47.0439°N 22.1356°E
- Country: Romania
- County: Bihor
- Population (2021-12-01): 1,784
- Time zone: EET/EEST (UTC+2/+3)
- Vehicle reg.: BH

Săcădat (Hungarian: Mezőszakadát) is a commune in Bihor County, Crișana, Romania. In 2011, it had a population of 1,910 people. It is composed of three villages: Borșa (Borostelek), Săbolciu (Mezőszabolcs) and Săcădat.
