= Aușeu =

- Commune
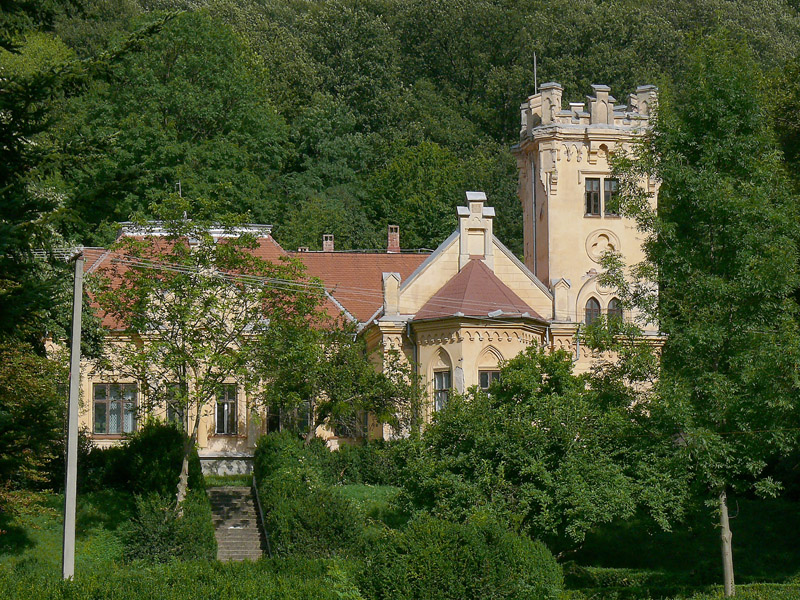
- Zichy Hunting Castle in Gheghie

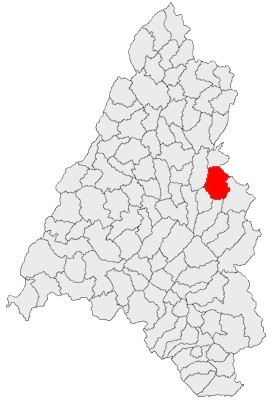
- Location in Bihor County

- Location in Romania
- Coordinates: 47°2′N 22°30′E
- Country: Romania
- County: Bihor

Government
  - Mayor (2024–2028): Mitică-Florentin Lazăr (PNL)
- Area: 72.58 km^{2} (28.02 sq mi)
- Elevation: 252 m (827 ft)
- Population (2021-12-01): 2,702
  - Density: 37.23/km^{2} (96.42/sq mi)
- Time zone: UTC+02:00 (EET)
  - Summer (DST): UTC+03:00 (EEST)
- Postal code: 417025
- Area code: +40 x59
- Vehicle reg.: BH
- Website: www.auseu.ro

Aușeu (Hungarian: Kisősi, Slovak: Aušeu) is a commune in Bihor County, Crișana, Romania. It is composed of six villages: Aușeu, Cacuciu Vechi (Kiskakucs), Codrișoru (Szekatura), Gheghie (Körösgégény), Groși (Tőtös), and Luncșoara (Élesdlok).

== Geography ==
The commune is located in the eastern part of Bihor County, 50 km (31 mi) from the county seat, Oradea, on the border with Sălaj County. It lies on the banks of the Crișul Repede River, at the confluence with its right tributaries, Borod, Pârâul Omului, and Gepiș.

== Demographics ==
Historical population
Year	Pop.	±%
1880	2,512	—
1890	2,970	+18.2%
1900	3,139	+5.7%
1910	3,463	+10.3%
1920	3,555	+2.7%
1930	3,768	+6.0%
1941	4,114	+9.2%
1956	3,867	−6.0%
1966	3,671	−5.1%
1977	3,689	+0.5%
1992	3,193	−13.4%
2002	3,049	−4.5%
2011	3,033	−0.5%
2021	2,702	−10.9%
Source: Census data

At the 2011 census, Aușeu had a population of 3,033, of which 83.9% were Romanians, 8.8% Roma, and 5.6% Slovaks. Of those inhabitants, 77.7% were Romanian Orthodox, 8.5% Pentecostal, 6.3% Baptist, and 5.9% Roman Catholic. At the 2021 census, the commune had a population of 2,702; of those, 81.16% were Romanians, 9.1% Roma, and 4.29% Slovaks.

== Zichy Hunting Castle ==
The Zichy Hunting Castle, located in Gheghie village, was commissioned by Domonkos Zichy, bishop of Rožňava, and was finished in 1860. In 1904, the castle was transformed into a hunting lodge by Ödön Zichy. At the end of World War I, the estate was bought by Gheorghe Mateescu, a boyar from Muntenia. After World War II, the castle was nationalized by the Communist regime; from 1950 to 2006, it served as a sanatorium for tuberculosis patients.

== Natives ==
- Alexandru Roman (1826–1897), cultural figure, journalist, and a founding member of the Romanian Academy.
