= Ciucea =

- Commune
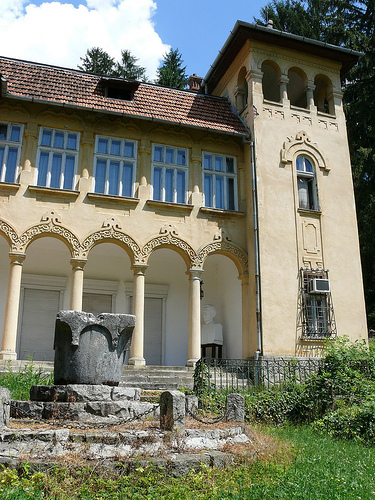
- The Ciucea castle

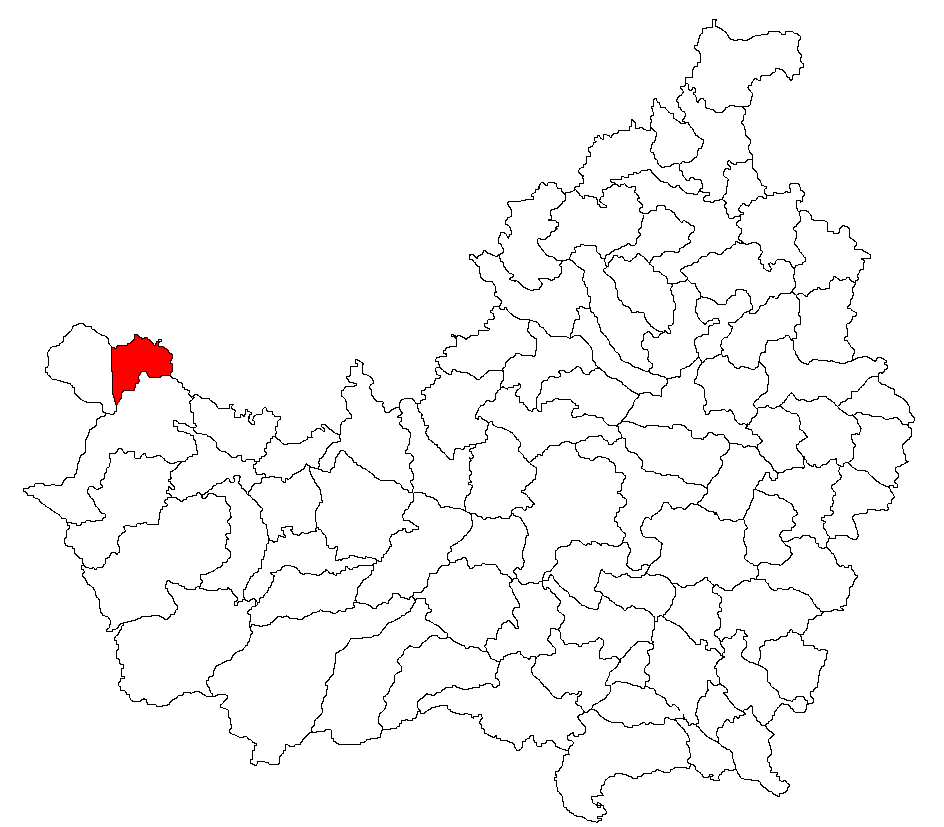
- Location in Cluj County

- Location in Romania
- Coordinates: 46°57′13″N 22°48′27″E
- Country: Romania
- County: Cluj
- Established: 1384
- Subdivisions: Ciucea, Vânători

Government
  - Mayor (2020–2024): Radu-Florin Abrudan (PNL)
- Area: 46.56 km^{2} (17.98 sq mi)
- Elevation: 435 m (1,427 ft)
- Population (2021-12-01): 1,293
  - Density: 27.77/km^{2} (71.93/sq mi)
- Time zone: UTC+02:00 (EET)
  - Summer (DST): UTC+03:00 (EEST)
- Postal code: 407225
- Area code: +40 x64
- Vehicle reg.: CJ
- Website: primariaciucea.ro

Ciucea (Romanian: [ˈtʃjutʃe̯a]; Hungarian: Csucsa [ˈt͡ʃut͡ʃɒ]; German: Tschetsch) is a commune of Cluj County, Transylvania, Romania, situated 20 km (12 mi) northwest of Huedin on the right bank of the Crișul Repede River. It is composed of two villages, Ciucea and Vânători (Börvény). It also included three other villages from 1968 to 2002, when these were split off to form Negreni Commune.

Endre Ady lived in the Castle during World War I, when it was owned by the family of his wife Berta Boncza.

The Octavian Goga Memorial House is located in Ciucea.

== Demographics ==
Historical population
Year	Pop.	±%
2002	1,745	—
2011	1,547	−11.3%
2021	1,293	−16.4%
Source: Census data

According to the census from 2002 there were 1,745 people living in this commune; of this population, 99.23% were ethnic Romanians, 0.61% ethnic Hungarians, and 0.09% ethnic Roma. At the 2021 census, the population of Ciucea had decreased to 1,293; of those, 92.58% were Romanians.

== See also ==
- Battle of Ciucea

== Notes ==
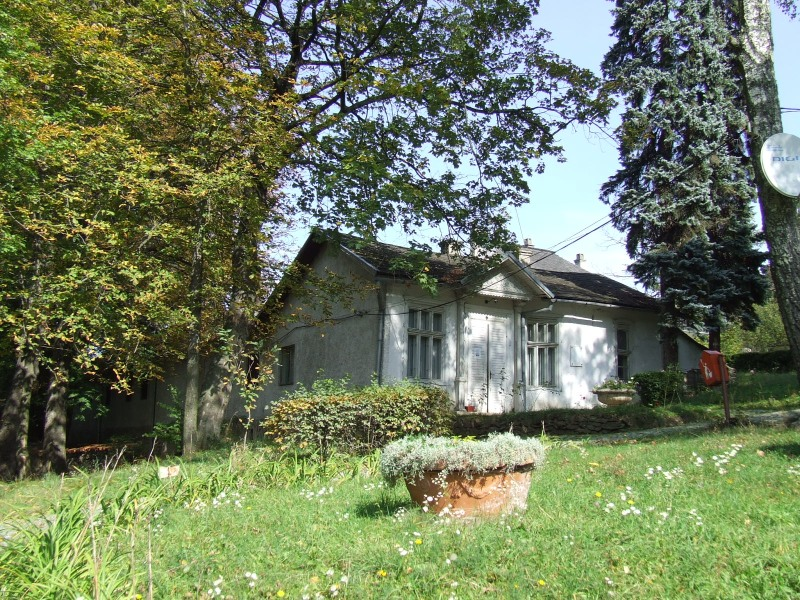
The Ady Endre House

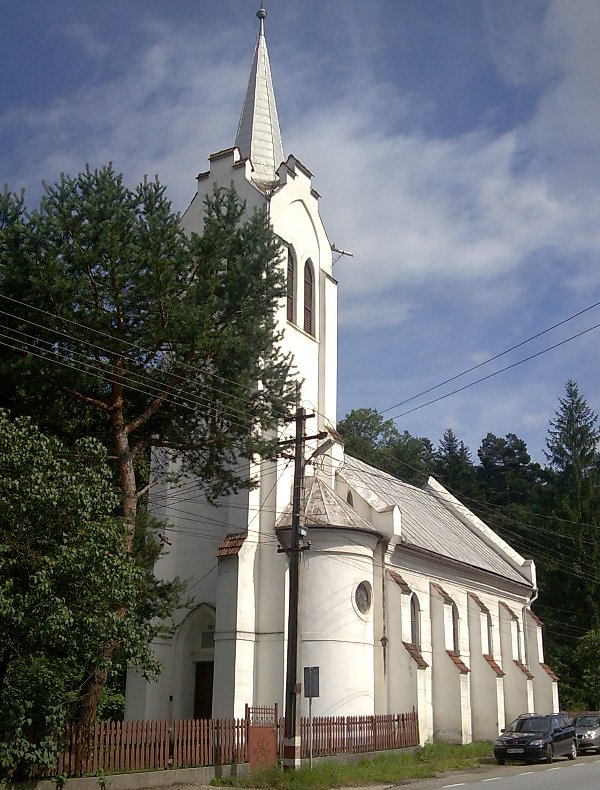
The Reformed church in Ciucea

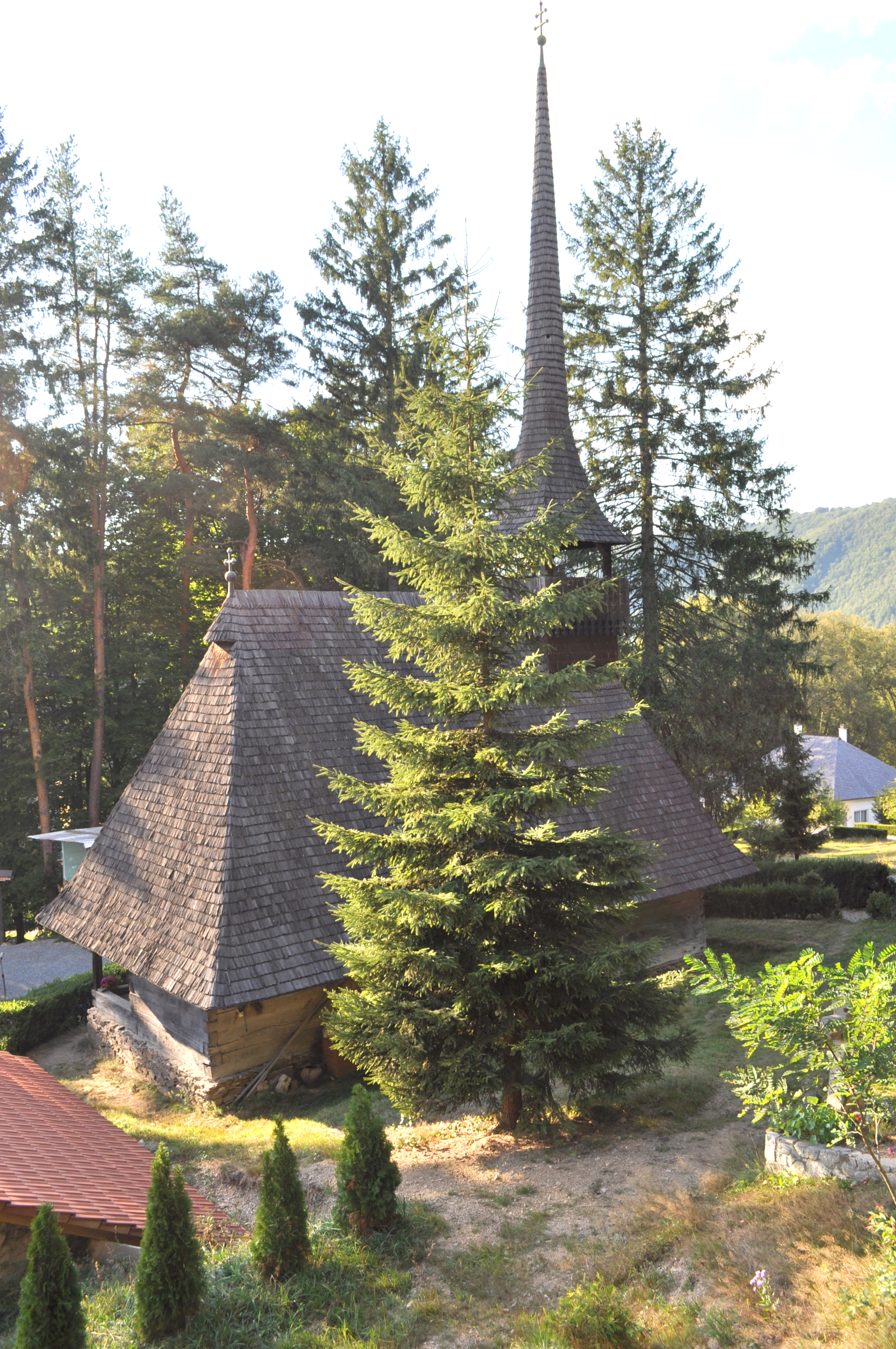
Gălpâia wooden church in Ciucea

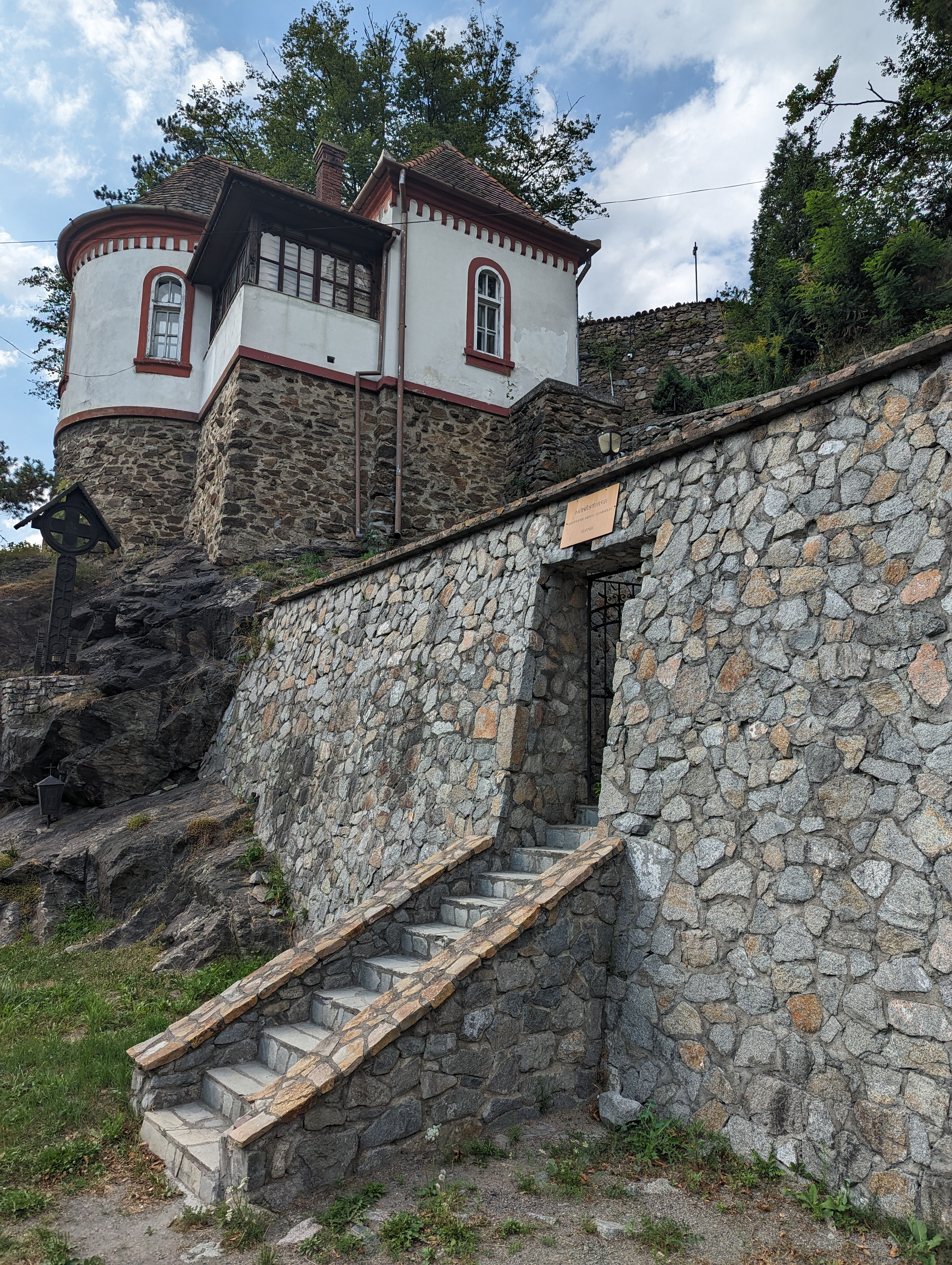
The entrance pavilion of the Assumption of the Virgin Mary Monastery in Ciucea
