= Blaj Pronouncement =

1868 document

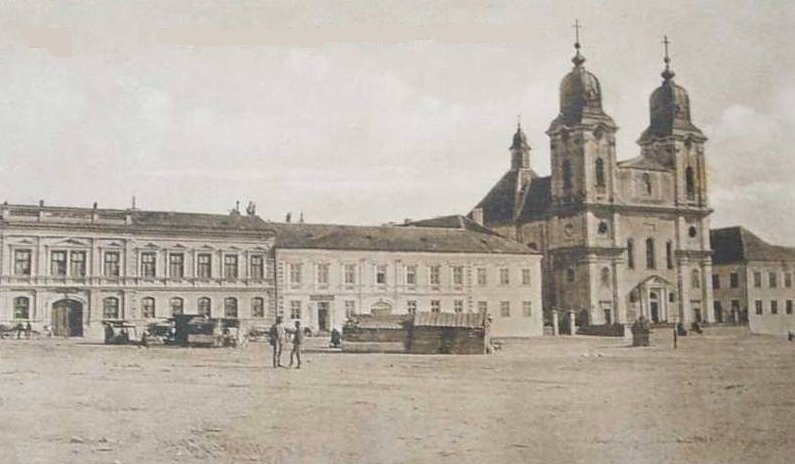
Scanul unei ilustrate de la începutul sec. XX

The Blaj Pronouncement (Romanian: Pronunciamentul de la Blaj, Hungarian: balázsfalvi kiáltvány) is an 1868 document that expresses the reaction of its Transylvanian Romanian backers to the Austro-Hungarian Compromise of 1867, which established a dual monarchy in Austria-Hungary. Drafted with input from a number of Romanian intellectuals, at the initiative of Ioan Rațiu and George Barițiu, the Pronouncement was presented at Blaj (Hungarian: Balázsfalva) on 3/15 May during a popular assembly, attended by some 60,000 peasants from throughout Transylvania, commemorating the 20th anniversary of its 1848 predecessor. It was a political declaration against the Hungarian system of government that did away with Transylvania's long-standing autonomy. It reaffirmed the principles and objectives outlined in the National petition of 1848 and called for the autonomy of Transylvania, the reopening of the Diet on the basis of proportional representation and the recognition of laws approved by the Diet of Hermannstadt (Sibiu) (1863–64), which recognised the rights of the Romanian nation, including that of proportional representation. It specified that Romanians did not recognise the Parliament of Hungary or its right to make laws for Transylvania.

The Pronouncement was published in the Romanian-language press of Transylvania, in Romania and in Western nations. In response, Boldizsár Horvát, the Hungarian Minister of Justice initiated public proceedings against the signatories (the capitulary provost Basiliu Rațiu, the Greek-Catholic Metropolitan Alexandru Sterca-Șuluțiu (who died in the interim), the canons Elie Vlassa and Grigore Mihali, professor Ioan Micu Moldovan, etc.). At the same time, the document expressed the principles of the passivist doctrine of refusing to recognise Hungarian institutions and boycotting the country's political life.
