= Hidișelu de Sus =

- Commune
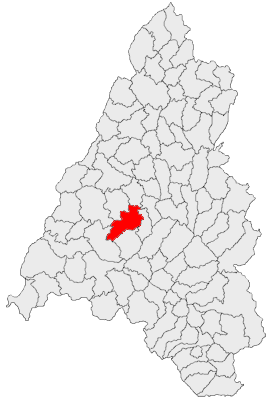
- Location in Bihor County

- Location in Romania
- Coordinates: 46°55′58″N 22°2′40″E
- Country: Romania
- County: Bihor
- Area: 89.97 km^{2} (34.74 sq mi)
- Population (2021-12-01): 3,259
  - Density: 36/km^{2} (94/sq mi)
- Time zone: EET/EEST (UTC+2/+3)
- Vehicle reg.: BH

Hidișelu de Sus (Hungarian: Harangmező, German: Glockendorf) is a commune in Bihor County, Crișana, Romania with a population of 3,315 people. It is composed of five villages: Hidișelu de Jos (Almamező), Hidișelu de Sus, Mierlău (Nyárló), Sântelec (Biharszentelek) and Șumugiu (Váraduzsopa).
