= Vadu Crișului =

- Commune
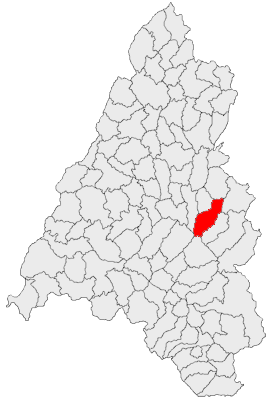
- Location in Bihor County

- Location in Romania
- Coordinates: 46°59′N 22°31′E
- Country: Romania
- County: Bihor
- Population (2021-12-01): 3,784
- Time zone: UTC+02:00 (EET)
  - Summer (DST): UTC+03:00 (EEST)
- Vehicle reg.: BH

Vadu Crișului (Hungarian: Rév) is a commune in Bihor County, Crișana, Romania with a recorded population of 3,784 in the 2021 Romanian census and 4,009 people in the 2011 Romanian census.

== Populated places ==
It is composed of four villages: Birtin (Bertény), Topa de Criș (Köröstopa), Tomnatic (Tomnatek) and Vadu Crișului.
