= Măgești =

- Commune
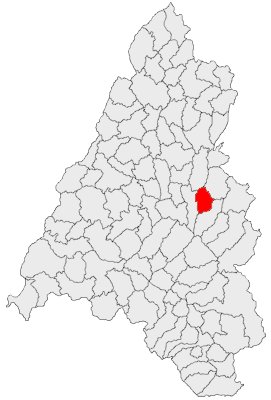
- Location in Bihor County

- Location in Romania
- Coordinates: 47°01′N 22°27′E
- Country: Romania
- County: Bihor
- Population (2021-12-01): 2,504
- Time zone: EET/EEST (UTC+2/+3)
- Vehicle reg.: BH

Măgești (Hungarian: Szászfalva) is a commune in Bihor County, Crișana, Romania with a population of 2,717 people. It is composed of seven villages: Butani (Rikosd), Cacuciu Nou (Nagykakucs), Dobricionești (Doborcsány), Gălășeni (Gálosháza), Josani (Krajnikfalva), Măgești and Ortiteag (Ürgeteg).
