= Borod, Bihor =

Borod
- Commune
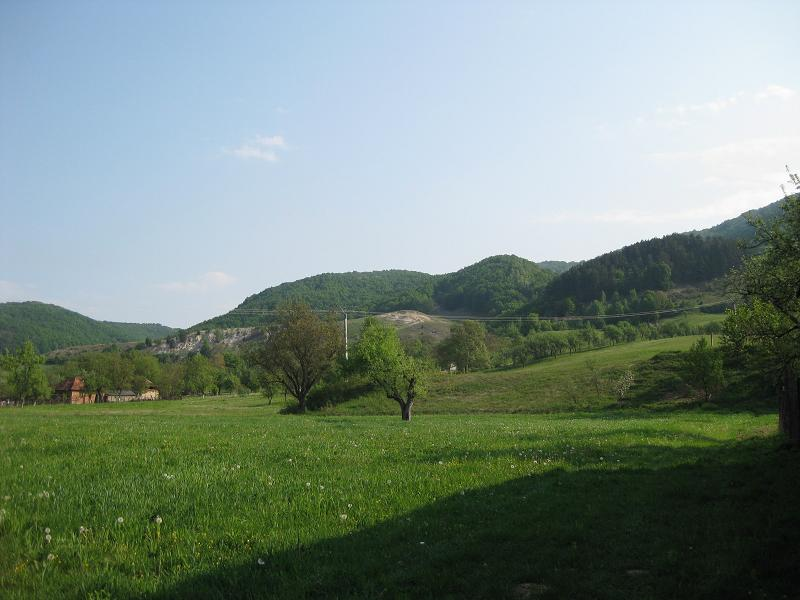
- Cetea village

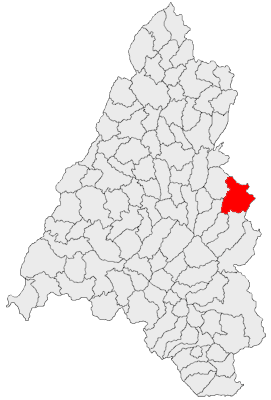
- Location in Bihor County

- Location in Romania
- Coordinates: 46°59′30″N 22°36′56″E
- Country: Romania
- County: Bihor

Government
  - Mayor (2020–2024): Sorin-Petru Sarca (PSD)
- Area: 105.62 km^{2} (40.78 sq mi)
- Elevation: 329 m (1,079 ft)
- Population (2021-12-01): 3,742
  - Density: 35.43/km^{2} (91.76/sq mi)
- Time zone: UTC+02:00 (EET)
  - Summer (DST): UTC+03:00 (EEST)
- Postal code: 417065
- Area code: +(40) 259
- Vehicle reg.: BH
- Website: www.borod.ro

Borod (Hungarian: Nagybáród) is a commune in Bihor County, Crișana, Romania. It is composed of six villages: Borod, Borozel (Kisbáród), Cetea (Cséklye), Cornițel (Báródsomos), Șerani (Sárán), and Valea Mare de Criș (Felsőpatak).

Historical population
Year	Pop.	±%
1880	3,392	—
1890	4,088	+20.5%
1900	4,715	+15.3%
1910	5,690	+20.7%
1920	5,823	+2.3%
1930	6,284	+7.9%
1941	7,008	+11.5%
1956	5,262	−24.9%
1966	5,354	+1.7%
1977	5,223	−2.4%
1992	4,539	−13.1%
2002	4,173	−8.1%
2011	3,843	−7.9%
2021	3,742	−2.6%
Source: Census data

At the 2021 census, the commune had a population of 3,742; of those, 81.64% were Romanians, 9.57% Slovaks, and 5.8% Roma.

== Sights ==
- Locul fosilifer de la Cornițel (Natural reserve 0.01 ha)
