= Tileagd =

Tileagd Mezőtelegd
- Commune
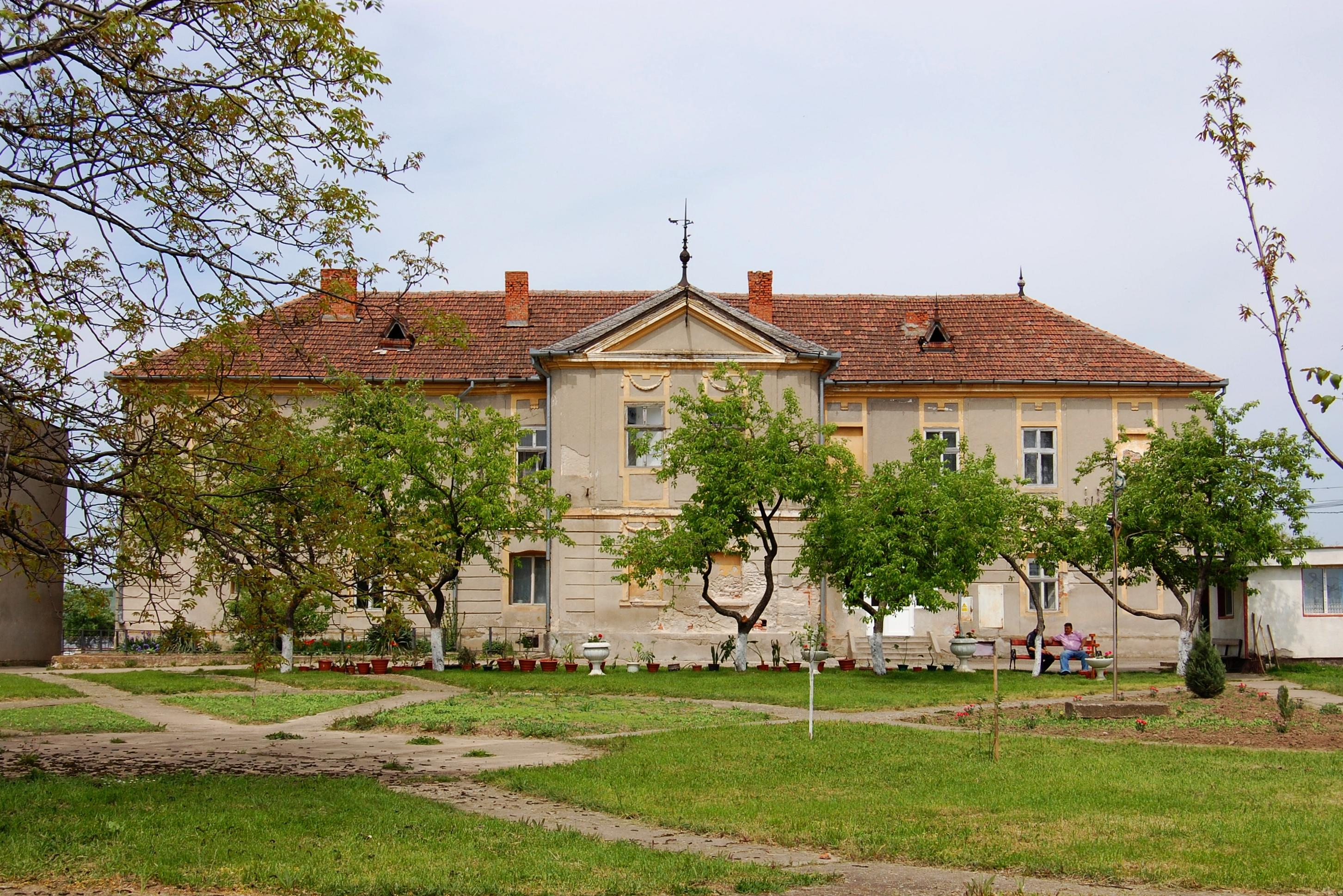
- School, former mansion of the Telegdi family

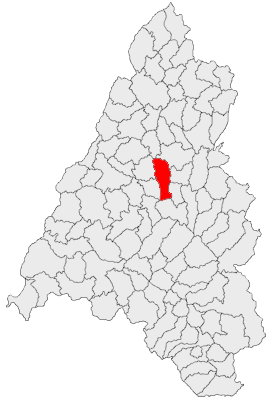
- Location in Bihor County

- Location in Romania
- Coordinates: 47°4′N 22°12′E
- Country: Romania
- County: Bihor
- Population (2021-12-01): 5,998
- Time zone: UTC+02:00 (EET)
  - Summer (DST): UTC+03:00 (EEST)
- Vehicle reg.: BH

Tileagd (Hungarian: Mezőtelegd) is a commune located in Bihor County, Crișana, Romania. It is composed of six villages: Bălaia (Kabaláspatak), Călătani (Kalotaitanya), Poșoloaca (Pósalaka), Tileagd, Tilecuș (Telkesd) and Uileacu de Criș (Pusztaújlak).

== Geography ==
It is on the picturesque road between Oradea and Cluj-Napoca, 23 kilometres from Oradea. The closest town to Tileagd is Aleșd, 12 km away. Tileagd is served by three CFR trains daily from Oradea, which continue to Aleșd, Huedin and Cluj-Napoca.

== Etymology ==
Its Hungarian name originates in the word telek which means "plot" in English with a "d" affixture. The first written record about the village was made in a warrant of 1294's copy of 1572 under the name Thelegd and then its name emerged in 1773 as Mező-Telegd.

== History ==
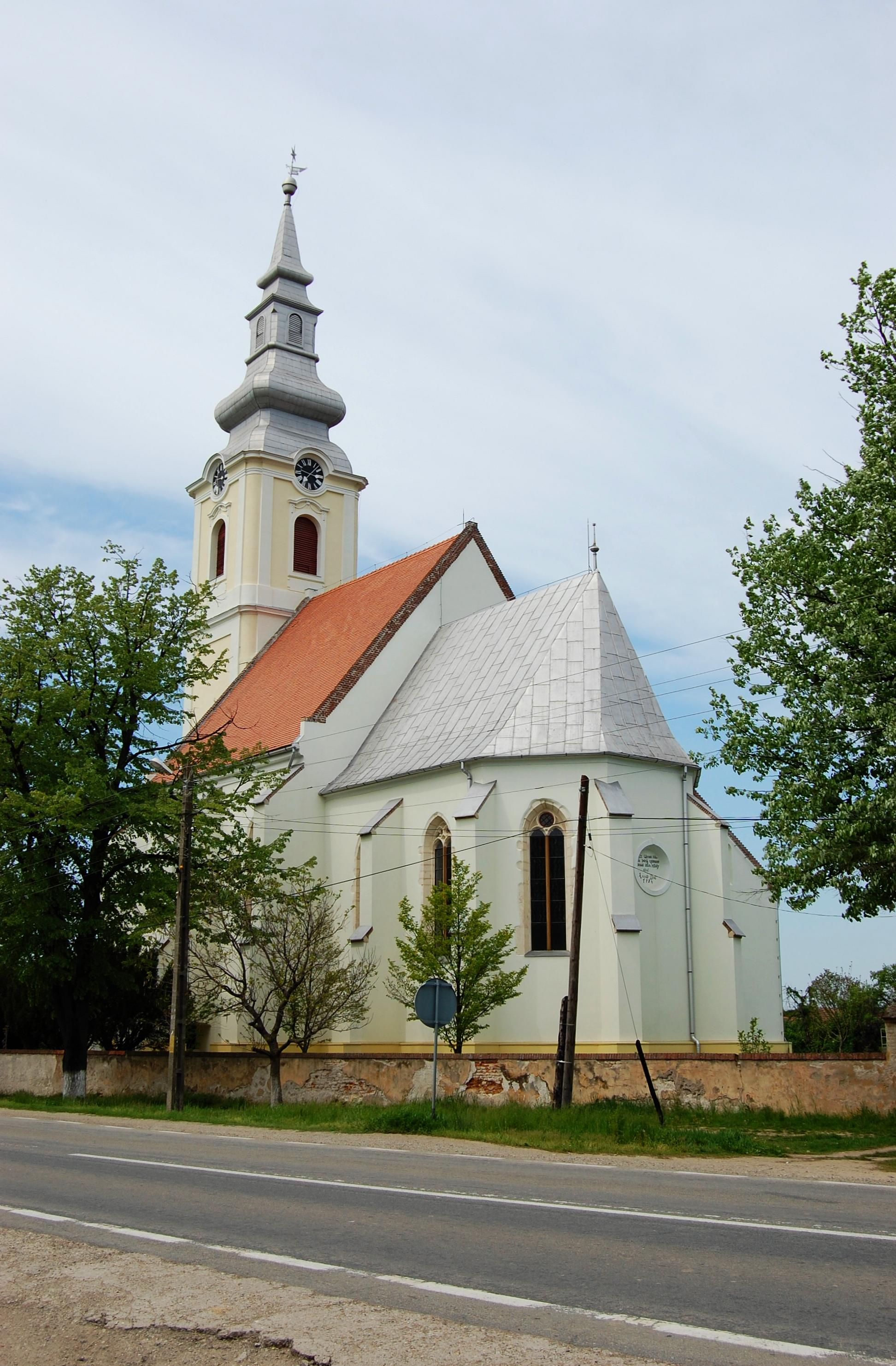
Reformed church

At the beginning of the 13th century, a group of Székelys lived in the area, having moved from Udvarhelyszék. They were called 'Székelys of Telegd' and the first name of Székelyudvarhely which is the centre Telegd, the area they moved into. In 1291, the founder of the Thelegdy family moved to here. In 1688, at the edge of the village, Imre Thököly's Kuruc army was defeated by general Heissler. With the building of the railway line, animal and food businesses started thriving in 1870. Later many new industrial, financial and other institutions were founded; for example, the first bank "Mezőtelegd vidéki Takarékpénztár Rt" in 1890; and an oil refinery and its associated a works were built at the beginning of the 20th century.

== Population ==
- In 1828, it had a population of 1575.
- In 1900, it had a population of 2508. These included 2034 Hungarians, 424 Romanians, 24 Germans, 13 Slovaks and 13 Gypsies.
- In 2002, it had a population of 3960. These included 2374 Romanians, 1016 Hungarians, 523 Gypsies and 40 Slovaks.

== Notable residents ==
- The bishop of Nagyszombat and the archbishop of Esztergom, Miklós Telegdi, was born here.
- The wife of Stephen Bocskay, Kata Hagymássy, died here.
