= Husasău de Tinca =

- Commune
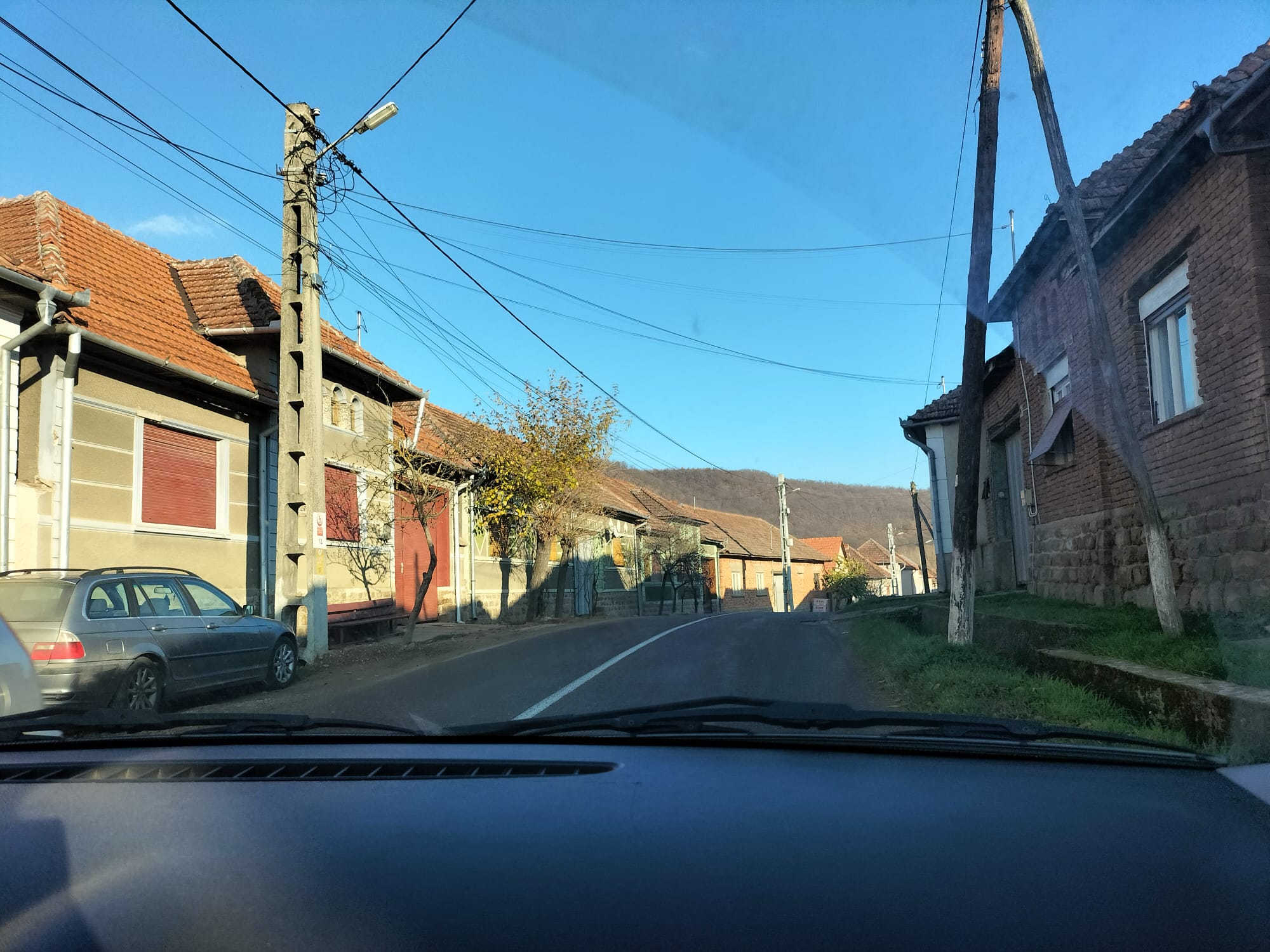
- Main street in Husasău de Tinca

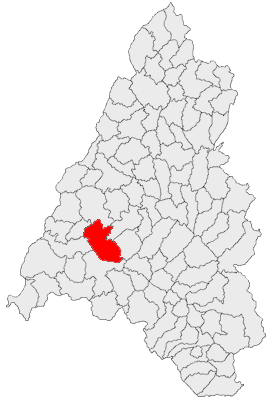
- Location in Bihor County

- Location in Romania
- Coordinates: 46°49′N 21°55′E
- Country: Romania
- County: Bihor

Government
  - Mayor (2020–2024): Mihai Faur (PSD)
- Area: 115.99 km^{2} (44.78 sq mi)
- Elevation: 134 m (440 ft)
- Population (2021-12-01): 2,429
  - Density: 20.94/km^{2} (54.24/sq mi)
- Time zone: UTC+02:00 (EET)
  - Summer (DST): UTC+03:00 (EEST)
- Postal code: 417290
- Area code: +(40) 259
- Vehicle reg.: BH
- Website: www.primariahusasaudetinca.ro

Husasău de Tinca (Hungarian: Biharhosszúaszó) is a commune in Bihor County, Crișana, Romania with a population of 2,429 people. It is composed of five villages: Fonău (Rózsafalva), Husasău de Tinca, Miersig (Nyárszeg), Oșand (Vasand), and Sititelec (Székelytelek).
