= Bratca =

- Commune
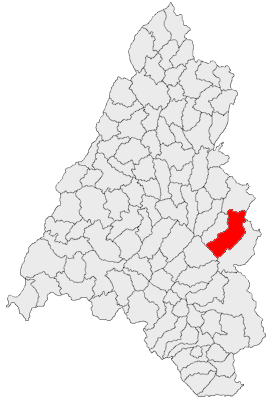
- Location in Bihor County

- Location in Romania
- Coordinates: 46°56′N 22°37′E
- Country: Romania
- County: Bihor
- Population (2021-12-01): 4,554
- Time zone: EET/EEST (UTC+2/+3)
- Vehicle reg.: BH

Bratca (Hungarian: Barátka, German: Kreuz) is a commune situated in Bihor County, Crișana, Romania. At 5,158 (2011), it is one of the county's largest communes. It is composed of six villages: Beznea (Delureni from 1964 to 1996; Báródbeznye), Bratca, Damiș (Erdődámos), Lorău (Remetelórév), Ponoară (Körösponor) and Valea Crișului (Nagyfeketepatak).

== History ==
Bratca had a population of 1,786 in 1941. At that time it was a center of aluminum and titanium mining. (Source=Columbia-Lippincott Gazetteer)

== Location ==
Bratca is located on the main road (European route E60) and railway line from Oradea to Cluj-Napoca and further east to Bucharest. Bratca is situated in the Apuseni Mountains, one of the most important mountain ranges in this part of Romania. Consequently, it is surrounded by impressive scenery and has large ecotourism or agritourism potential.

== Tourism and Culture ==
The Bratca area is known for its traditional clothing.
