= Crișul Repede =

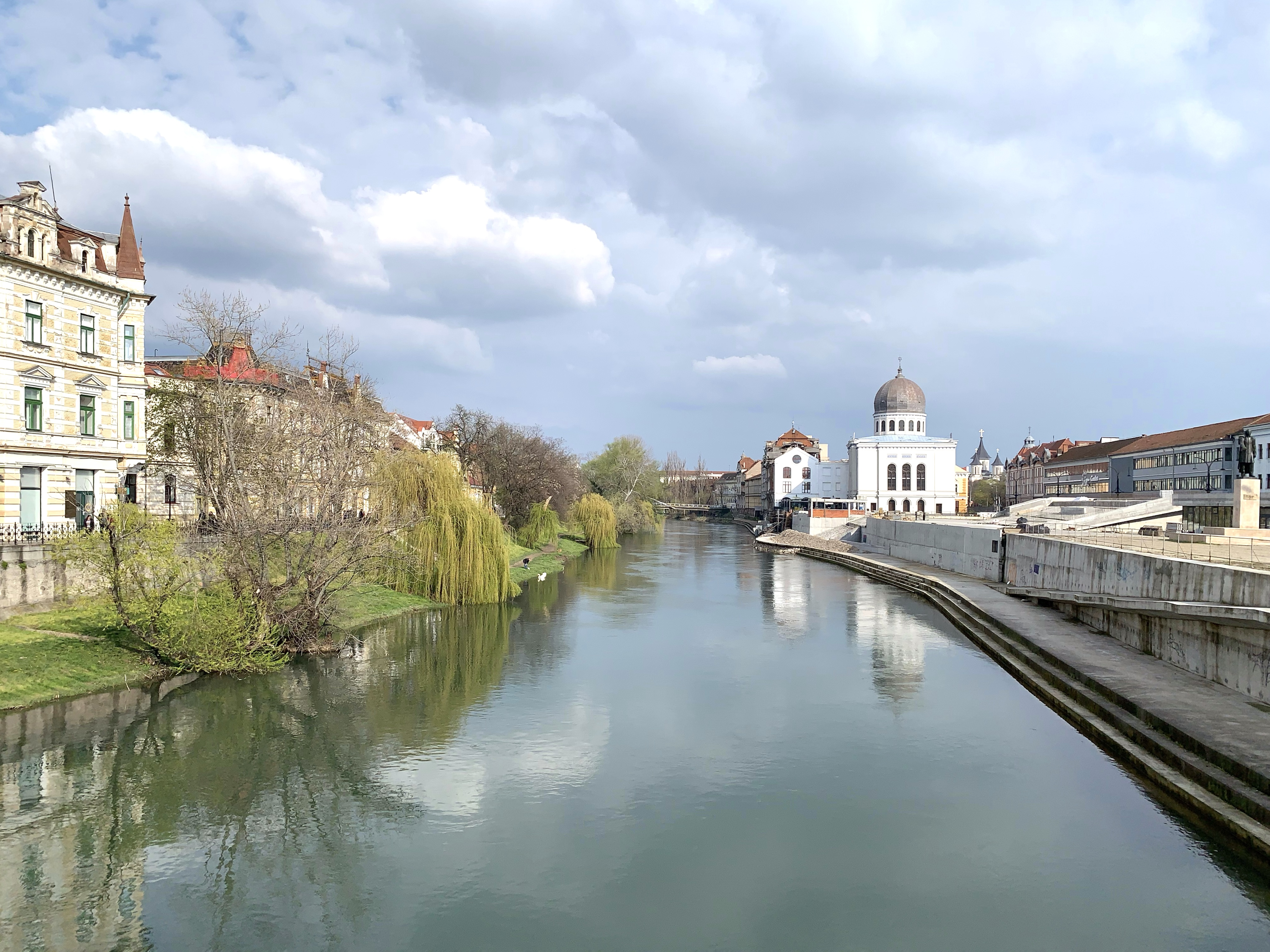
- The Crișul Repede in Oradea with the Oradea Neolog Synagogue on the right

- Location within Hungary Location within Romania
- Native name: Sebes-Körös (Hungarian)

Location
- Countries: Romania and Hungary
- Counties: Romania: Cluj; Bihor; Hungary: Hajdú-Bihar; Békés
- Towns: Aleșd; Oradea

Physical characteristics
- Source: Gilău Mountains, Romania
  - elevation: 710 m (2,330 ft)
- Mouth: Körös
  - location: Gyomaendrőd, Hungary
  - coordinates: 46°55′13″N 20°58′39″E
- Length: 209 km (130 mi)
- Basin size: 9,119 km^{2} (3,521 sq mi)

Basin features
- Progression: Körös→ Tisza→ Danube→ Black Sea
- Tributaries
  - left: Iad, Drăgan
  - right: Barcău (Berettyó)

The Crișul Repede (Romanian Crișul Repede ("the rapid Criș"); Hungarian Sebes-Körös) is a river in Bihor County, Crișana, Romania and in southeastern Hungary (Körösvidék). Together with the rivers Crișul Alb ("the white Criș") and Crișul Negru ("the black Criș"), it makes up the Three Criș rivers ("Cele Trei Crișuri"). These are considered the main rivers in the Crișana region of Romania. Historically, when Crișana was recognised as an official region (today, Romania is divided into 40 counties), the Criș rivers were the most important in the region. The basin size of the Crișul Repede is 9,119 km^{2} (3,521 sq mi). Its length in Romania is 171 km (106 mi).

The Crișul Repede runs through the city of Oradea, the capital of Bihor County. It flows into the Körös (Criș) near Gyomaendrőd, in Hungary. Part of the water from the Crișul Repede is diverted towards the Crișul Negru by the Criș Collector Canal.

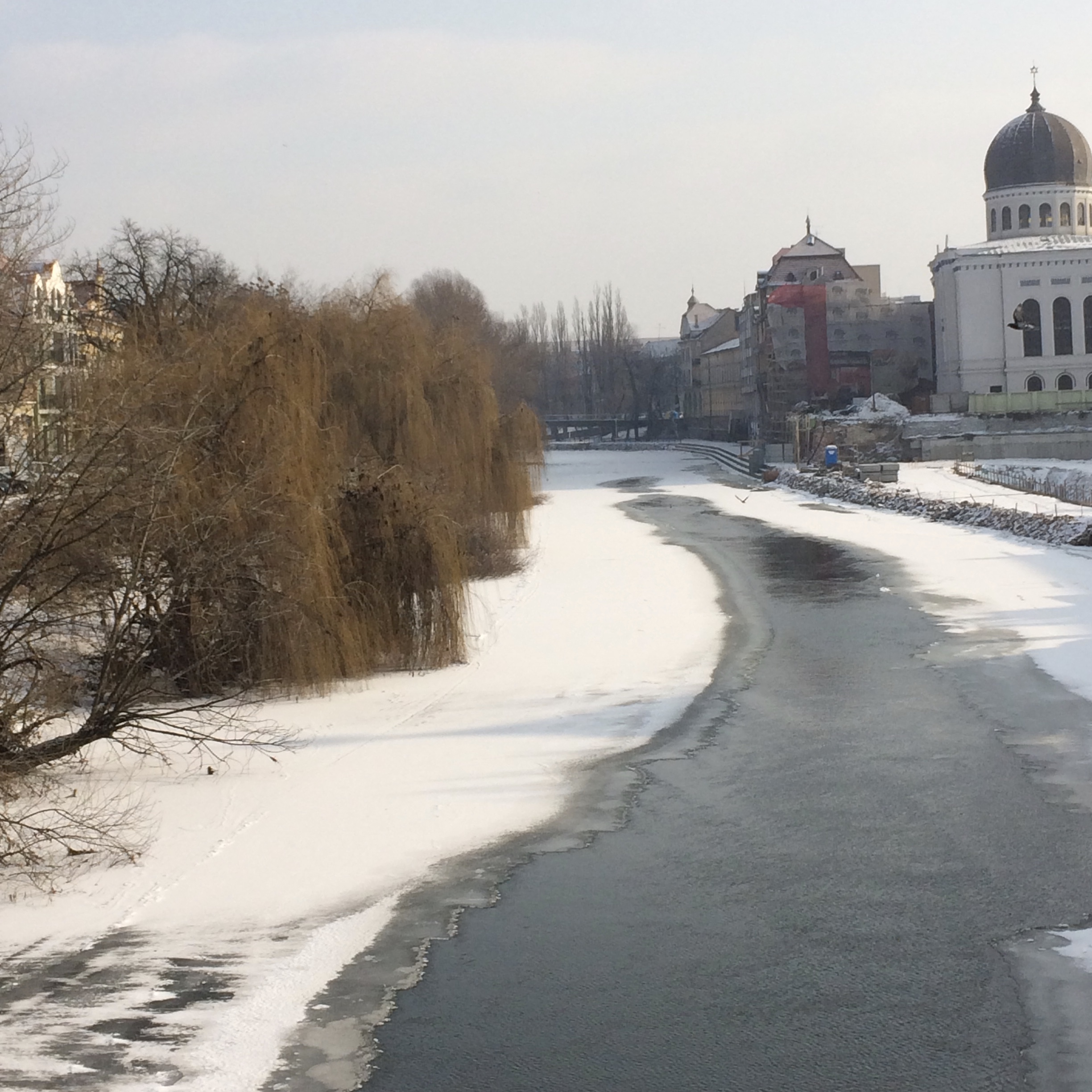
The river partially froze in 2017

== Towns and villages ==
The following towns and villages are situated along the Crișul Repede, from source to mouth:

- In Romania: Izvoru Crișului, Huedin, Poieni, Ciucea, Negreni, Bucea, Bulz, Bratca, Vadu Crișului, Aușeu, Aleșd, Tileagd, and Oradea.
- In Hungary: Körösszakál, Körösújfalu, and Körösladány.

== Tributaries ==
The following rivers are tributaries to the Crișul Repede (from source to mouth):

- Left: Șipot, Domoș, Călata, Săcuieu, Drăgan, Surduc, Neportoc, Valea Satului, Iad, Valea Boiului, Brătcuța, Misir, Dobrinești, Râciu, Mnierea, Cropandă, Medeș, Chijic, Sărand, Tășad, Bonor, Peța, Alceu, Corhana
- Right: Poicu, Semeni, Negrea, Beznea, Borod, Pârâul Omului, Gepiș, Izvor, Huta, Uileac, Bonda, Pasteur, Barcău
