= Pir =

Pir or PIR may refer to:

== Places ==
- Pir, Kerman, Iran, a village
- Pir, Satu Mare, Romania, a commune

== Religion ==
- Pir (Sufism), a Sufi teacher or spiritual leader
- Pir (Zoroastrianism), a pilgrimage site in Persia, typically Zoroastrian

== People ==
- Pir of the Britons (fl. 125 BC), legendary king of the Britons, according to Geoffrey of Monmouth
- Khan Jahan Lodi (died 1631), originally named Pir Khan, Afghan noble who rebelled against the Mughal Empire
- Ziya Pir (born 1970), Turkish entrepreneur and politician

== Science and technology ==
- PIR (gene), for a human protein that is a possible transcriptional coregulator
- Parrot intermediate representation, one of the two assembly languages for the Parrot virtual machine
- Partners in Research, Canadian bio-medical research charity
- Passive infrared sensor, detects infrared emission
- Peak information rate, a burstable rate set on routers and switches that allow throughput overhead
- Polyisocyanurate, a plastic used for thermal insulation
- Private information retrieval, a protocol for retrieving data without revealing what was retrieved
- Protein Information Resource, database and bioinformatics resource
- Public Interest Registry, manages .org Internet domain

== Other ==
- "Pir" (song), a song by Prakash Saput
- Pacific Imperial Railroad, a defunct railway company in California
- Performance Index Rating, a statistical formula in basketball
- Philadelphia International Records, a record company based in Philadelphia, Pennsylvania
- Philosophy in Review, an academic journal
- Phoenix International Raceway, Avondale, Arizona
- Pittsburgh Industrial Railroad, reporting mark
- Portland International Raceway, Portland, Oregon
- Pre-Islamic recent period, an archaeological assemblage in the Persian Gulf
- Prosopographia Imperii Romani, a prosopographical directory of notable Romans from the Imperial Age
- Parachute Infantry Regiment, an airborne infantry unit of the United States Army
- Pierre Regional Airport, South Dakota, United States (IATA code: PIR)
- PIR, NYSE symbol for Texas-based retailer Pier 1 Imports

== See also ==
- Sayyid Shah Mardan Shah-II (1928–2012), known as Pir of Pagaro VII, Sufi spiritual leader and Pakistani politician
- Sibghatullah Shah Rashdi III (born 1956), known as Pir of Pagaro VIII, Pakistani politician
- Pir Baba (c. 1502–c. 1583), Sufi Pir
- Bāyazīd Khān Ansārī (c. 1525–1585), commonly known as Pir Roshan, Pashtun warrior-poet and Sufi Pir
- Pir Sadardin, fourteenth-century Shia Ismaili Da'i
- Hasan Pir, 14th century Taiyabi Ismaili saint in India
- Pirs (disambiguation)
