= Ier =

Ier Ér
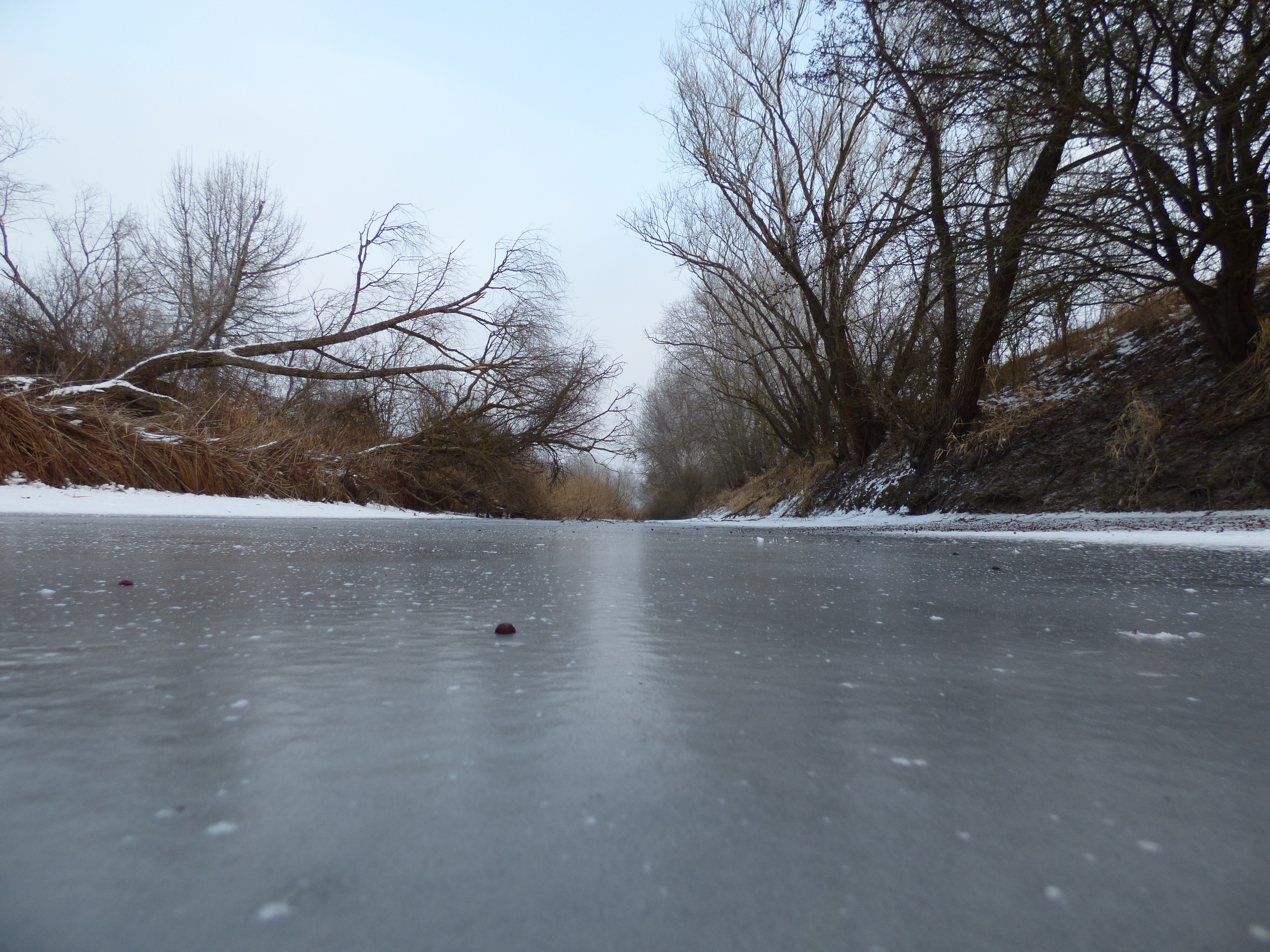
- The frozen river

- Location within Hungary Location within Romania

Location
- Countries: Romania and Hungary
- Counties: Satu Mare; Bihor; Hajdú-Bihar
- Villages: Andrid; Săcueni; Diosig; Pocsaj

Physical characteristics
- Mouth: Barcău (Berettyó)
  - location: Pocsaj
  - coordinates: 47.2779°N 21.7997°E

Basin features
- Progression: Barcău→ Crișul Repede→ Körös→ Tisza→ Danube→ Black Sea
- Tributaries
  - left: Checheț
  - right: Salcia

The Ier or Eriu (Hungarian: Ér) is a right tributary of the river Barcău (Berettyó) in Romania and Hungary. It discharges into the Barcău in Pocsaj. The Andrid Dam is constructed on this river. The Ier flows through the villages Mihăieni, Eriu-Sâncrai, Ghirolt, Rădulești, Hotoan, Sudurău, Dindești, Andrid, Sălacea, Cherechiu, Săcueni, Diosig in Romania, and Pocsaj in Hungary. In Romania, its length is 100 km (62 mi) and its basin size is 1,392 km^{2} (537 sq mi).

== Hydronymy ==
The Hungarian name of the river means "brook". The Romanian name derives from that.

== Tributaries ==
The following rivers are tributaries to the river Ier:

- Left: Checheț, Santău, Sărvăzel, Pir
- Right: Cubic, Sânmiclăuș, Pârâul Morii, Zimoiaș, Rât, Salcia, Ierul Îngust
