= Sânmiclăuș =

Sânmiclăuș may refer to several places in Romania:

- Sânmiclăuș, a village in Șona Commune, Alba County
- Sânmiclăuș, a village in Moftin Commune, Satu Mare County
- Sânmiclăuș (river), a tributary of the Ier in Satu Mare County
