= Cubic (river) =

- Location within Romania

Location
- Country: Romania
- Counties: Satu Mare County
- Villages: Ghirolt, Rădulești

Physical characteristics
- Mouth: Ier
  - location: near Căuaș
  - coordinates: 47.5789°N 22.5094°E
- Length: 17 km (11 mi)

Basin features
- Progression: Ier→ Barcău→ Crișul Repede→ Körös→ Tisza→ Danube→ Black Sea
- River code: III.1.44.33.28.a

The Cubic is a right tributary of the river Ier in Romania. It flows into the Ier near Căuaș. Its length is 17 km (11 mi).
