= Checheț =

- Location within Romania

Location
- Country: Romania
- Counties: Satu Mare County
- Villages: Săcășeni, Cig, Ghilești, Căuaș

Physical characteristics
- Mouth: Ier
  - location: Căuaș
  - coordinates: 47.5694°N 22.5045°E
- Length: 33 km (21 mi)
- Basin size: 151 km^{2} (58 sq mi)

Basin features
- Progression: Ier→ Barcău→ Crișul Repede→ Körös→ Tisza→ Danube→ Black Sea
- Tributaries
  - left: Timiș, Ciripicea
- River code: III.1.44.33.28.1

The Checheț is a left tributary of the river Ier in Romania. It flows into the Ier near Căuaș. Its length is 33 km (21 mi) and its basin size is 151 km^{2} (58 sq mi).
