= Săuca (river) =

- Location within Romania

Location
- Country: Romania
- Counties: Satu Mare County
- Villages: Săuca

Physical characteristics
- Mouth: Santău
  - location: Upstream of Sudurău
  - coordinates: 47.5217°N 22.4599°E
- Length: 11 km (6.8 mi)
- Basin size: 34 km^{2} (13 sq mi)

Basin features
- Progression: Santău→ Ier→ Barcău→ Crișul Repede→ Körös→ Tisza→ Danube→ Black Sea
- River code: III.1.44.33.28.3.4

The Săuca is a left tributary of the river Santău in Romania. It flows into the Santău near Sudurău. Its length is 11 km (6.8 mi) and its basin size is 34 km^{2} (13 sq mi).
