= Piru =

Piru may refer to:

== Towns and villages ==
- Piru, Bihar, a village in Aurangabad district, Bihar, India
- Piru, Indonesia, a town on the west coast of Seram Island which serves as the capital of Seram Bagian Barat Regency
- Piru, Iran, a village in Kerman Province
- Piru, California, a small town in Ventura County in the United States
- Piru Mansion, also known as Newhall Mansion, a mansion located in the city.
- Piru Creek, a creek in California
- Lake Piru, a lake in California
- Piru Nou, a Romanian city in the Pir, Satu Mare commune
- Piru Bay, (or Teluk Piru), a bay in Indonesia

== People and groups ==
- Pirus, a street gang
- Piru Singh (1918-1948), Indian army non-commissioned officer
- Piru Gaínza (or Agustin Gaínza) (1922-1995), Spanish footballer
- Piru Sáez, Argentine actor and singer
- Alexandru Piru, Romanian historian and critic

== Other ==
- Piru Bay languages, a group of Malayo-Polynesian languages spoken around Indonesia
  - Piru language, an Indonesian language primarily spoken on the island of Seram
- Piru (spirit), an evil spirit or demon in Finnish mythology
  - Finnish profanity § piru
- Piru, another name for the Talibong sword of the Philippines

== See also ==
- Puru (disambiguation)
- Piri (disambiguation)
