= Ciripicea =

- Location within Romania

Location
- Country: Romania
- Counties: Satu Mare County

Physical characteristics
- Mouth: Checheț
  - location: Ghilești
  - coordinates: 47.5363°N 22.5713°E
- Length: 17 km (11 mi)
- Basin size: 48 km^{2} (19 sq mi)

Basin features
- Progression: Checheț→ Ier→ Barcău→ Crișul Repede→ Körös→ Tisza→ Danube→ Black Sea
- Tributaries
  - left: Valea Micăului

The Ciripicea is a left tributary of the river Checheț in Romania. It flows into the Checheț in Ghilești. Its length is 17 km (11 mi) and its basin size is 48 km^{2} (19 sq mi).
