= Santău (river) =

- Location within Romania

Location
- Country: Romania
- Counties: Satu Mare County
- Villages: Cehal, Cehăluț, Tășnad, Santău, Sudurău

Physical characteristics
- Source: Cehal
- Mouth: Ier
  - location: Sudurău
  - coordinates: 47.5393°N 22.4430°E
- Length: 35 km (22 mi)
- Basin size: 169 km^{2} (65 sq mi)

Basin features
- Progression: Ier→ Barcău→ Crișul Repede→ Körös→ Tisza→ Danube→ Black Sea
- Tributaries
  - left: Cean, Săuca
  - right: Orbău, Valea Neagră
- River code: III.1.44.33.28.3

The Santău is a left tributary of the river Ier in Romania. It flows into the Ier near Sudurău. Its length is 35 km (22 mi) and its basin size is 169 km^{2} (65 sq mi).
