= Zimoiaș =

- Location within Romania

Location
- Country: Romania
- Counties: Satu Mare County
- Villages: Andrid

Physical characteristics
- Mouth: Ier
  - coordinates: 47.4907°N 22.3488°E
- Length: 15 km (9.3 mi)
- Basin size: 33 km^{2} (13 sq mi)

Basin features
- Progression: Ier→ Barcău→ Crișul Repede→ Körös→ Tisza→ Danube→ Black Sea
- River code: III.1.44.33.28.7

The Zimoiaș is a right tributary of the river Ier in Romania. It flows into the Ier near Andrid. Its length is 15 km (9.3 mi) and its basin size is 33 km^{2} (13 sq mi).
