= Sânmiclăuș (river) =

- Location within Romania

Location
- Country: Romania
- Counties: Satu Mare County
- Villages: Sânmiclăuș, Tiream, Vezendiu

Physical characteristics
- Mouth: Ier
  - coordinates: 47.5458°N 22.4477°E
- Length: 12 km (7.5 mi)
- Basin size: 81 km^{2} (31 sq mi)

Basin features
- Progression: Ier→ Barcău→ Crișul Repede→ Körös→ Tisza→ Danube→ Black Sea
- Tributaries
  - right: Vetijgat
- River code: III.1.44.33.28.2

The Sânmiclăuș is a right tributary of the river Ier in Romania. It flows into the Ier near Sudurău. Its length is 12 km (7.5 mi) and its basin size is 81 km^{2} (31 sq mi).
