= Mesentea =

Mesentea may refer to several places in Romania:

- Mesentea village, Galda de Jos Commune, Alba County
- Ady Endre village, Căuaș Commune, Satu Mare County, formerly called Mesentea
