= Sărvăzel =

- Location within Romania

Location
- Country: Romania
- Counties: Satu Mare County
- Villages: Sărvăzel

Physical characteristics
- Mouth: Ier
  - coordinates: 47.5031°N 22.3954°E
- Length: 12 km (7.5 mi)
- Basin size: 16 km^{2} (6.2 sq mi)

Basin features
- Progression: Ier→ Barcău→ Crișul Repede→ Körös→ Tisza→ Danube→ Black Sea
- River code: III.1.44.33.28.5

The Sărvăzel is a left tributary of the river Ier in Romania. It passes the village of Sărvăzel and flows into the Ier near Piru Nou. Its length is 12 km (7.5 mi) and its basin size is 16 km^{2} (6.2 sq mi).
