= Mouca =

River in Romania

- Location within Romania

Location
- Country: Romania
- Counties: Bihor County
- Villages: Valea lui Mihai, Șimian

Physical characteristics
- Mouth: Salcia
  - coordinates: 47.4442°N 22.0733°E
- Length: 13 km (8.1 mi)
- Basin size: 55 km^{2} (21 sq mi)

Basin features
- Progression: Salcia→ Ier→ Barcău→ Crișul Repede→ Körös→ Tisza→ Danube→ Black Sea
- River code: III.1.44.33.28.10.1

The Mouca is a left tributary of the river Salcia in Romania. It flows into the Salcia near Șilindru. Its length is 13 km (8.1 mi) and its basin size is 55 km^{2} (21 sq mi).
