= Pârâul Morii =

Pârâul Morii may refer to:

- Pârâul Morii, a tributary of the Șes in Caraș-Severin County
- Pârâul Morii (Ier), a tributary of the Ier in Satu Mare County
