= June 20 =

June 20 this year in various calendars
- Saturday, 20 June 2026
Akan	Kwamemene
Armenian	5 Hrotich 1475
Aztec	Tepeilhuitl 1, 6 Ātl
Babylonian	4 Simanu, 2337 SE
Balinese pawukon	Menga, Beteng, Jaya, Pon, Was, Saniscara of Dunggulan, Guru, Jangur, Manusa
Bengali	6 Asharh, BS 1433
Chinese	Yin Wood Ox・Willow Mansion; Fire Horse Year, Month 5, Day 6 (Mangzhong, 1 day until Xiazhi)
Common Era	20 June 2026 CE
Coptic	13 Paoni, AM 1742
Egyptian	5 Athyr, 2775 NE
Ethiopian	13 Sanē, 2018 Amätä Məhrät
French Republican	Décade I, Duodi de Messidor de l'Année 234 de la République
Gregorian	20 June, AD 2026
Hebrew	5 Tamuz, AM 5786
Hindu	Maghā・Vajra; Solar: 6 Āṣāḍha, 1948 SE; Lunisolar: Ṣaṣṭhī, Śukla pakṣa of Jyeṣṭha, 2083 VE; Rāudra・5127 KY・1,872,746
Icelandic	Laugardagur, 29 Skerpla 2026
Islamic	4 Muharram, AH 1448 (using tabular method)
ISO week date	2026-W25-6
Japanese	6 Satsuki, Reiwa 8 (Bōshu, 1 day until Geshi)
Julian	7 June, AD 2026 (AM 7534)
Julian day	2461212
Korean	6 Maldal, 4359 DE
Maya	13.0.13.12.9; 2 Tzec, 6 Muluc
Roman	ante diem VII Idus Iunias, MMDCCLXXIX AUC
Solar Hijri	30 Khordad, SH 1405
Tibetan	6 snron, me pho rta 2153 or 1772 or 1000

<<	June					>>
Su	Mo	Tu	We	Th	Fr	Sa
	1	2	3	4	5	6
7	8	9	10	11	12	13
14	15	16	17	18	19	20
21	22	23	24	25	26	27
28	29	30
2026

June 20 in recent years
2026 (Saturday)
2025 (Friday)
2024 (Thursday)
2023 (Tuesday)
2022 (Monday)
2021 (Sunday)
2020 (Saturday)
2019 (Thursday)
2018 (Wednesday)
2017 (Tuesday)

June 20 is the 171st day of the year (172nd in leap years) in the Gregorian calendar; 194 days remain until the end of the year.

== Events ==
=== Pre-1600 ===
- 451 – Battle of Chalons: Flavius Aetius battles Attila the Hun. After the battle, which was inconclusive, Attila retreats. Despite suffering catastrophic losses that led to the collapse of their alliance with the Goths and the destruction of much of the Roman army, the Romans nevertheless proclaimed victory despite the lack of any clear military success.
- 1180 – First Battle of Uji, starting the Genpei War in Japan.
- 1210 – Michael I Komnenos Doukas, the first ruler of the despotate of Epirus, signs a treaty with the Republic of Venice and becomes their vassal.
- 1295 – The Treaty of Anagni, an attempt mediated by the papacy to end the War of the Sicilian Vespers, is signed by the crown of Aragon, the kingdom of France and kingdom of Naples.

=== 1601–1900 ===
- 1622 – The Battle of Höchst takes place during the Thirty Years' War.
- 1631 – The Sack of Baltimore: The Irish village of Baltimore is attacked by Barbary slave traders.
- 1652 – Tarhoncu Ahmed Pasha is appointed Grand Vizier of the Ottoman Empire.
- 1685 – Monmouth Rebellion: James Scott, 1st Duke of Monmouth declares himself King of England at Bridgwater.
- 1756 – A British garrison is imprisoned in the Black Hole of Calcutta.
- 1782 – The U.S. Congress adopts the Great Seal of the United States.
- 1787 – Oliver Ellsworth moves at the Federal Convention to call the government the 'United States'.
- 1789 – Deputies of the French Third Estate take the Tennis Court Oath.
- 1791 – King Louis XVI, disguised as a valet, and the French royal family attempt to flee Paris during the French Revolution.
- 1819 – The U.S. vessel SS Savannah arrives at Liverpool, United Kingdom. It is the first steam-propelled vessel to cross the Atlantic, although most of the journey is made under sail.
- 1837 – King William IV dies, and is succeeded by his niece, Victoria.
- 1840 – Samuel Morse receives the patent for the telegraph.
- 1862 – Barbu Catargiu, the Prime Minister of Romania, is assassinated.
- 1863 – American Civil War: West Virginia is admitted as the 35th U.S. state.
- 1877 – Alexander Graham Bell installs the world's first commercial telephone service in Hamilton, Ontario, Canada.
- 1893 – Lizzie Borden is acquitted of the murders of her father and stepmother.
- 1895 – The Kiel Canal, crossing the base of the Jutland peninsula and the busiest artificial waterway in the world, is officially opened.
- 1900 – Boxer Rebellion: The Imperial Chinese Army begins a 55-day siege of the Legation Quarter in Beijing, China.
- 1900 – Baron Eduard Toll, leader of the Russian Polar Expedition of 1900, departs Saint Petersburg in Russia on the explorer ship Zarya, never to return.

=== 1901–present ===
- 1921 – Workers of Buckingham and Carnatic Mills in the city of Chennai, India, begin a four-month strike.
- 1926 – The 28th International Eucharistic Congress begins in Chicago, with over 250,000 spectators attending the opening procession.
- 1942 – The Holocaust: Kazimierz Piechowski and three others, dressed as members of the SS-Totenkopfverbände, steal an SS staff car and escape from the Auschwitz concentration camp.
- 1943 – The Detroit race riot breaks out and continues for three more days.
- 1943 – World War II: The Royal Air Force launches Operation Bellicose, the first shuttle bombing raid of the war. Avro Lancaster bombers damage the V-2 rocket production facilities at the Zeppelin Works while en route to an air base in Algeria.
- 1944 – World War II: The Battle of the Philippine Sea concludes with a decisive U.S. naval victory. The lopsided naval air battle is also known as the "Great Marianas Turkey Shoot".
- 1944 – World War II: During the Continuation War, the Soviet Union demands unconditional surrender from Finland during the beginning of partially successful Vyborg–Petrozavodsk Offensive. The Finnish government refuses.
- 1944 – The experimental MW 18014 V-2 rocket reaches an altitude of 176 km, becoming the first man-made object to reach outer space.
- 1945 – The United States Secretary of State approves the transfer of Wernher von Braun and his team of Nazi rocket scientists to the U.S. under Operation Paperclip.
- 1948 – In Western Allied-occupied Germany, the Currency Reform of 1948 goes into effect, introducing the Deutsche Mark. The Soviet Military Administration in Germany responded by imposing the Berlin Blockade four days later.
- 1956 – A Venezuelan Super-Constellation crashes in the Atlantic Ocean off Asbury Park, New Jersey, killing 74 people.
- 1957 – A deadly F5 tornado strikes Fargo, North Dakota, killing twelve.
- 1959 – A rare June hurricane strikes Canada's Gulf of St. Lawrence killing 35.
- 1960 – The Mali Federation gains independence from France (it later splits into Mali and Senegal).
- 1963 – Following the Cuban Missile Crisis, the Soviet Union and the United States sign an agreement to establish the so-called "red telephone" link between Washington, D.C., and Moscow.
- 1964 – A Curtiss C-46 Commando crashes in the Shengang District of Taiwan, killing 57 people.
- 1972 – Watergate scandal: An 18 1/2-minute gap appears in the tape recording of the conversations between U.S. President Richard Nixon and his advisers regarding the recent arrests of his operatives while breaking into the Watergate complex.
- 1973 – Snipers fire upon left-wing Peronists in Buenos Aires, Argentina, in what is known as the Ezeiza massacre. At least 13 are killed and more than 300 are injured.
- 1973 – Aeroméxico Flight 229 crashes on approach to Licenciado Gustavo Díaz Ordaz International Airport, killing all 27 people on board.
- 1975 – The film Jaws is released in the United States, becoming the highest-grossing film of that time and starting the trend of films known as "summer blockbusters".
- 1979 – ABC News correspondent Bill Stewart is shot dead by a Nicaraguan National Guard soldier under the regime of Anastasio Somoza Debayle during the Nicaraguan Revolution. The murder is caught on tape and sparks an international outcry against the regime.
- 1982 – The International Conference on the Holocaust and Genocide opens in Tel Aviv, despite attempts by the Turkish government to cancel it, as it included presentations on the Armenian genocide.
- 1982 – The Argentine Corbeta Uruguay base on Southern Thule surrenders to Royal Marine commandos in the final action of the Falklands War.
- 1988 – Haitian president Leslie Manigat is ousted from power in a coup d'état led by Lieutenant General Henri Namphy.
- 1990 – Asteroid Eureka is discovered.
- 1990 – The 7.4 M_{w} Manjil–Rudbar earthquake affects northern Iran with a maximum Mercalli intensity of X (Extreme), killing 35,000–50,000, and injuring 60,000–105,000.
- 1991 – The German Bundestag votes to move seat of government from the former West German capital of Bonn to the present capital of Berlin.
- 1994 – The 1994 Imam Reza shrine bomb explosion in Iran leaves at least 25 dead and 70 to 300 injured.
- 1996 – Space Shuttle Columbia launches on STS-78 to conduct life science and microgravity research aboard the Spacelab module.
- 2003 – The Wikimedia Foundation is founded in St. Petersburg, Florida.
- 2008 – Twelve people are killed, including nine clubgoers and three police officers, during a crowd crush in Mexico City.
- 2011 – RusAir Flight 9605 crashes in Besovets during approach to Petrozavodsk Airport, killing 47.
- 2019 – Iran's Air Defense Forces shoot down an American surveillance drone over the Strait of Hormuz amid rising tensions between the two countries.
- 2025 – The first EF5 tornado in 12 years occurs in Enderlin, North Dakota.

== Births ==
=== Pre-1600 ===
- 1005 – Ali az-Zahir, Fatimid caliph of Egypt (died 1036)
- 1389 – John of Lancaster, 1st Duke of Bedford, English statesman (died 1435)
- 1469 – Gian Galeazzo Sforza, duke of Milan (died 1494)
- 1566 – Sigismund III Vasa, Polish and Swedish king (died 1632)
- 1583 – Jacob De la Gardie, Swedish soldier and politician, Lord High Constable of Sweden (died 1652)

=== 1601–1900 ===
- 1634 – Charles Emmanuel II, duke of Savoy (died 1675)
- 1642 – (O.S.) George Hickes, English minister and scholar (died 1715)
- 1647 – (O.S.) John George III, Elector of Saxony (died 1691)
- 1717 – Jacques Saly, French sculptor and painter (died 1776)
- 1723 – (O.S.) Adam Ferguson, Scottish philosopher and historian (died 1816)
- 1737 – Tokugawa Ieharu, Japanese shōgun (died 1786)
- 1754 – Amalie of Hesse-Darmstadt, princess of Baden (died 1832)
- 1756 – Joseph Martin Kraus, German-Swedish composer and educator (died 1792)
- 1761 – Jacob Hübner, German entomologist and author (died 1826)
- 1763 – Wolfe Tone, Irish rebel leader (died 1798)
- 1770 – Moses Waddel, American minister and academic (died 1840)
- 1771 – Thomas Douglas, 5th Earl of Selkirk, Scottish philanthropist and politician, Lord Lieutenant of Kirkcudbright (died 1820)
- 1771 – Hermann von Boyen, Prussian general and politician, Prussian Minister of War (died 1848)
- 1777 – Jean-Jacques Lartigue, Canadian bishop (died 1840)
- 1778 – Jean Baptiste Gay, vicomte de Martignac, French politician, 7th Prime Minister of France (died 1832)
- 1786 – Marceline Desbordes-Valmore, French poet and author (died 1859)
- 1796 – Luigi Amat di San Filippo e Sorso, Italian cardinal (died 1878)
- 1808 – Samson Raphael Hirsch, German rabbi and scholar (died 1888)
- 1809 – Isaak August Dorner, German theologian and academic (died 1884)
- 1813 – Joseph Autran, French poet and author (died 1877)
- 1819 – Jacques Offenbach, German-French cellist and composer (died 1880)
- 1847 – Gina Krog, Norwegian suffragist and women's rights activist (died 1916)
- 1855 – Richard Lodge, English historian and academic (died 1936)
- 1858 – Charles W. Chesnutt, American novelist and short story writer (died 1932)
- 1859 – Christian von Ehrenfels, Austrian philosopher (died 1932)
- 1860 – Alexander Winton, Scottish-American race car driver and engineer (died 1932)
- 1860 – Jack Worrall, Australian cricketer, footballer, and coach (died 1937)
- 1861 – Frederick Gowland Hopkins, English biochemist and academic, Nobel Prize laureate (died 1947)
- 1865 – George Redmayne Murray, English biologist and physician (died 1939)
- 1866 – James Burns, English cricketer (died 1957)
- 1867 – Leon Wachholz, Polish scientist and medical examiner (died 1942)
- 1869 – Laxmanrao Kirloskar, Indian businessman, founded the Kirloskar Group (died 1956)
- 1870 – Georges Dufrénoy, French painter and academic (died 1943)
- 1872 – George Carpenter, American 5th General of The Salvation Army (died 1948)
- 1875 – Reginald Punnett, English geneticist, statistician, and academic (died 1967)
- 1882 – Daniel Sawyer, American golfer (died 1937)
- 1884 – Mary R. Calvert, American astronomer and author (died 1974)
- 1884 – Johannes Heinrich Schultz, German psychiatrist and psychotherapist (died 1970)
- 1885 – Andrzej Gawroński, Polish linguist and academic (died 1927)
- 1887 – Kurt Schwitters, German painter and illustrator (died 1948)
- 1889 – John S. Paraskevopoulos, Greek-South African astronomer and academic (died 1951)
- 1891 – Giannina Arangi-Lombardi, Italian soprano (died 1951)
- 1891 – John A. Costello, Irish lawyer and politician, 3rd Taoiseach of Ireland (died 1976)
- 1893 – Wilhelm Zaisser, German soldier and politician (died 1958)
- 1894 – Lloyd Hall, American chemist and academic (died 1971)
- 1896 – Wilfrid Pelletier, Canadian pianist, composer, and conductor (died 1982)
- 1897 – Elisabeth Hauptmann, German author and playwright (died 1973)
- 1899 – Jean Moulin, French soldier and engineer (died 1943)

=== 1901–present ===
- 1903 – Sam Rabin, English wrestler, sculptor, and singer (died 1991)
- 1905 – Lillian Hellman, American playwright and screenwriter (died 1984)
- 1906 – Catherine Cookson, English novelist (died 1998)
- 1906 – Bob King, American high jumper and obstetrician (died 1965)
- 1906 – William Reid, Scottish mining engineer (died 1985)
- 1907 – Jimmy Driftwood, American singer-songwriter and banjo player (died 1998)
- 1908 – Billy Werber, American baseball player (died 2009)
- 1908 – Gus Schilling, American actor (died 1957)
- 1909 – Errol Flynn, Australian-American actor (died 1959)
- 1910 – Josephine Johnson, American author and poet (died 1990)
- 1911 – Gail Patrick, American actress (died 1980)
- 1912 – Geoffrey Baker, English Field Marshal and Chief of the General Staff of the British Army (died 1980)
- 1912 – Anthony Buckeridge, English author (died 2004)
- 1912 – Jack Torrance, American shot putter and football player (died 1969)
- 1914 – Gordon Juckes, Canadian ice hockey player (died 1994)
- 1914 – Muazzez İlmiye Çığ, Turkish archaeologist and academic (died 2024)
- 1915 – Dick Reynolds, Australian footballer and coach (died 2002)
- 1915 – Terence Young, Chinese-English director and screenwriter (died 1994)
- 1916 – Jean-Jacques Bertrand, Canadian lawyer and politician, 21st Premier of Quebec (died 1973)
- 1916 – T. Texas Tyler, American country music singer-songwriter and guitarist (died 1972)
- 1917 – Helena Rasiowa, Austrian-Polish mathematician and academic (died 1994)
- 1918 – George Lynch, American race car driver (died 1997)
- 1918 – Zoltán Sztáray, Hungarian-American author (died 2011)
- 1920 – Danny Cedrone, American guitarist and bandleader (died 1954)
- 1920 – Thomas Jefferson, American trumpet player (died 1986)
- 1921 – Byron Farwell, American historian and author (died 1999)
- 1921 – Pancho Segura, Ecuadorian tennis player (died 2017)
- 1921 – Paul Tiulana, Iñupiat artist and dancer (died 1994)
- 1923 – Peter Gay, German-American historian, author, and academic (died 2015)
- 1923 – Jerzy Nowak, Polish actor and educator (died 2013)
- 1924 – Chet Atkins, American guitarist and record producer (died 2001)
- 1924 – Fritz Koenig, German sculptor and academic, designed The Sphere (died 2017)
- 1925 – Doris Hart, American tennis player and educator (died 2015)
- 1925 – Audie Murphy, American lieutenant and actor, Medal of Honor recipient (died 1971)
- 1926 – Rehavam Ze'evi, Israeli general and politician, 9th Israeli Minister of Tourism (died 2001)
- 1928 – Eric Dolphy, American saxophonist, flute player, and composer (died 1964)
- 1928 – Martin Landau, American actor and producer (died 2017)
- 1928 – Jean-Marie Le Pen, French intelligence officer and politician (died 2025)
- 1928 – Asrat Woldeyes, Ethiopian surgeon and educator (died 1999)
- 1929 – Edgar Bronfman, Sr., Canadian-American businessman and philanthropist (died 2013)
- 1929 – Anne Weale, English journalist and author (died 2007)
- 1929 – Edith Windsor, American lesbian, gay, bisexual and transgender rights activist (died 2017)
- 1930 – Magdalena Abakanowicz, Polish sculptor and academic (died 2017)
- 1930 – John Waine, English bishop (died 2020)
- 1931 – Olympia Dukakis, American actress (died 2021)
- 1931 – James Tolkan, American actor and director (died 2026)
- 1932 – Robert Rozhdestvensky, Russian poet and author (died 1994)
- 1933 – Danny Aiello, American actor (died 2019)
- 1933 – Claire Tomalin, English journalist and author
- 1934 – Wendy Craig, English actress
- 1935 – Jim Barker, American politician (died 2005)
- 1935 – Len Dawson, American football player (died 2022)
- 1935 – Armando Picchi, Italian footballer and coach (died 1971)
- 1936 – Billy Guy, American singer (died 2002)
- 1936 – Enn Vetemaa, Estonian author and screenwriter (died 2017)
- 1937 – Stafford Dean, English actor and singer
- 1937 – Jerry Keller, American singer-songwriter
- 1938 – Joan Kirner, Australian educator and politician, 42nd Premier of Victoria (died 2015)
- 1938 – Mickie Most, English music producer (died 2003)
- 1939 – Ramakant Desai, Indian cricketer (died 1998)
- 1939 – Budge Rogers, English rugby player and manager
- 1940 – Eugen Drewermann, German priest and theologian
- 1940 – John Mahoney, English-born American actor (died 2018)
- 1941 – Stephen Frears, English actor, director, and producer
- 1941 – Ulf Merbold, German physicist and astronaut
- 1941 – Albert Shesternyov, Soviet footballer, captain of the Soviet Union national team and CSKA Moscow (died 1994)
- 1942 – Neil Trudinger, Australian mathematician and theorist
- 1942 – Brian Wilson, American singer, songwriter and producer (died 2025)
- 1945 – Anne Murray, Canadian singer and guitarist
- 1946 – Birgitte, Duchess of Gloucester
- 1946 – Xanana Gusmão, Timorese soldier and politician, 1st President of East Timor
- 1946 – David Kazhdan, Russian-Israeli mathematician and academic
- 1946 – Bob Vila, American television host
- 1946 – André Watts, American pianist and educator (died 2023)
- 1947 – Dolores "LaLa" Brooks, American pop singer
- 1948 – Cirilo Flores, American bishop (died 2014)
- 1948 – Alan Longmuir, Scottish bass player and songwriter (died 2018)
- 1948 – Ludwig Scotty, Nauruan politician, 10th President of Nauru (died 2026)
- 1949 – Gotabaya Rajapaksa, 8th president of Sri Lanka
- 1949 – Lionel Richie, American singer, songwriter, pianist, producer, and actor
- 1950 – Nouri al-Maliki, Iraqi politician, 76th Prime Minister of Iraq
- 1951 – Tress MacNeille, American voice actress
- 1951 – Sheila McLean, Scottish scholar and academic
- 1951 – Paul Muldoon, Irish poet and academic
- 1952 – John Goodman, American actor
- 1952 – Vikram Seth, Indian author and poet
- 1953 – Robert Crais, American author and screenwriter
- 1953 – Raúl Ramírez, Mexican tennis player
- 1953 – Willy Rampf, German engineer
- 1954 – Michael Anthony, American musician
- 1954 – Allan Lamb, South African-English cricketer and sportscaster
- 1954 – Ilan Ramon, Israeli colonel, pilot, and astronaut (died 2003)
- 1954 – Huda Zoghbi, American geneticist
- 1955 – E. Lynn Harris, American author (died 2009)
- 1956 – Peter Reid, English footballer and manager
- 1956 – Sohn Suk-hee, South Korean newscaster
- 1958 – Kelly Johnson, English hard rock guitarist and songwriter (died 2007)
- 1958 – Mark Milley, retired United States Army general, served as chairman of the Joint Chiefs of Staff
- 1959 – Robert B. Weide, American screenwriter, producer and director
- 1960 – Philip M. Parker, American economist and author
- 1960 – John Taylor, English bass player and actor
- 1963 – Kirk Baptiste, American sprinter
- 1963 – Mark Ovenden, British author and broadcaster
- 1964 – Pierfrancesco Chili, Italian motorcycle racer
- 1964 – Silke Möller, German runner
- 1966 – Boaz Yakin, American director, producer, and screenwriter
- 1967 – Nicole Kidman, American-Australian actress
- 1967 – Dan Tyminski, American singer-songwriter
- 1968 – Mike Basham, American stock car racing driver
- 1968 – Mateusz Morawiecki, Polish banker, economist, and politician
- 1968 – Robert Rodriguez, American director, producer, and screenwriter
- 1969 – Paulo Bento, Portuguese footballer and manager
- 1969 – Misha Verbitsky, Russian mathematician and academic
- 1969 – MaliVai Washington, American tennis player and sportscaster
- 1970 – Andrea Nahles, German politician, German Minister of Labour and Social Affairs
- 1971 – Rodney Rogers, American basketball player and coach (died 2025)
- 1971 – Annik Van den Bosch, Belgian politician
- 1972 – Alexis Alexoudis, Greek footballer
- 1973 – Chino Moreno, American singer, guitarist and lyricist
- 1975 – Joan Balcells, Spanish tennis player
- 1975 – Daniel Zítka, Czech footballer
- 1976 – Juliano Belletti, Brazilian footballer
- 1976 – Carlos Lee, Panamanian baseball player
- 1977 – Gordan Giriček, Croatian basketball player
- 1978 – Quinton Jackson, American mixed martial artist and actor
- 1978 – Frank Lampard, English footballer
- 1978 – Jan-Paul Saeijs, Dutch footballer
- 1979 – Charles Howell III, American golfer
- 1980 – Franco Semioli, Italian footballer
- 1980 – Fabian Wegmann, German cyclist
- 1981 – Brede Hangeland, Norwegian footballer
- 1982 – Aleksei Berezutski, Russian footballer
- 1982 – Vasili Berezutski, Russian footballer
- 1982 – Example, English singer/rapper
- 1983 – Josh Childress, American basketball player
- 1983 – Darren Sproles, American football player
- 1984 – Hassan Adams, American basketball player
- 1985 – Aurélien Chedjou, Cameroonian footballer
- 1985 – Matt Flynn, American football player
- 1985 – Caroline Polachek, American singer and songwriter
- 1986 – Jakub Štěpánek, Czech ice hockey player
- 1986 – Dreama Walker, American actress
- 1987 – A-fu, Taiwanese singer and songwriter
- 1987 – Carsten Ball, Australian tennis player
- 1987 – Asmir Begović, Bosnian footballer
- 1987 – Joseph Ebuya, Kenyan runner
- 1989 – Christopher Mintz-Plasse, American actor
- 1989 – Javier Pastore, Argentinian footballer
- 1989 – Terrelle Pryor, American football player
- 1990 – Ding Ning, Chinese table tennis player
- 1990 – DeQuan Jones, American basketball player
- 1990 – Mohamed Mbougar Sarr, Senegalese writer
- 1991 – Kalidou Koulibaly, Senegalese footballer
- 1991 – Rick ten Voorde, Dutch footballer
- 1993 – Sead Kolašinac, Bosnian footballer
- 1994 – Leonard Williams, American football player
- 1995 – Caroline Weir, Scottish footballer
- 1995 – Carol Zhao, Canadian tennis player
- 1996 – Sam Bennett, Canadian ice hockey player
- 1997 – Bálint Kopasz, Hungarian sprint canoeist
- 2001 – Nicolas Jackson, Senegalese footballer
- 2001 – Gonçalo Ramos, Portuguese footballer
- 2002 – Giulia Stabile, Spanish-Italian dancer and television presenter
- 2002 – Hugo Ekitike, French footballer
- 2003 – Hans Niemann, American chess player
- 2003 – Marc Pubill, Spanish footballer

== Deaths ==
=== Pre-1600 ===
- 465 – Emperor Wencheng of Northern Wei (born 440)
- 840 – Louis the Pious, Carolingian emperor (born 778)
- 930 – Hucbald, Frankish monk and music theorist
- 981 – Adalbert, archbishop of Magdeburg
- 1176 – Mikhail of Vladimir, Russian prince
- 1351 – Margareta Ebner, German nun and mystic (born 1291)
- 1597 – Willem Barentsz, Dutch cartographer and explorer (born 1550)

=== 1601–1900 ===
- 1605 – Feodor II of Russia (born 1589)
- 1668 – Heinrich Roth, German missionary and scholar (born 1620)
- 1776 – Benjamin Huntsman, English businessman (born 1704)
- 1787 – Carl Friedrich Abel, German viol player and composer (born 1723)
- 1800 – Abraham Gotthelf Kästner, German mathematician and academic (born 1719)
- 1810 – Axel von Fersen the Younger, Swedish general and politician (born 1755)
- 1815 – Guillaume Philibert Duhesme, French general (born 1766)
- 1820 – Manuel Belgrano, Argentinian general, economist, and politician (born 1770)
- 1837 – William IV, King of the United Kingdom (born 1765)
- 1840 – Pierre Claude François Daunou, French historian and politician (born 1761)
- 1847 – Juan Larrea, Argentinian captain and politician (born 1782)
- 1869 – Hijikata Toshizō, Japanese commander (born 1835)
- 1870 – Jules de Goncourt, French historian and author (born 1830)
- 1872 – Élie Frédéric Forey, French general (born 1804)
- 1875 – Joseph Meek, American police officer and politician (born 1810)
- 1876 – John Neal, American writer, critic, editor, lecturer, and activist (born 1793)
- 1888 – Johannes Zukertort, Polish-English chess player (born 1842)

=== 1901–present ===
- 1906 – John Clayton Adams, English painter (born 1840)
- 1909 – Friedrich Martens, Estonian-Russian historian, lawyer, and diplomat (born 1845)
- 1925 – Josef Breuer, Austrian physician and psychologist (born 1842)
- 1929 – Emmanouil Benakis, Greek merchant and politician, 35th Mayor of Athens (born 1843)
- 1945 – Bruno Frank, German author, poet, and playwright (born 1878)
- 1947 – Bugsy Siegel, American mobster (born 1906)
- 1952 – Luigi Fagioli, Italian race car driver (born 1898)
- 1958 – Kurt Alder, German chemist and academic, Nobel Prize laureate (born 1902)
- 1963 – Raphaël Salem, Greek-French mathematician and academic (born 1898)
- 1965 – Bernard Baruch, American financier and politician (born 1870)
- 1966 – Georges Lemaître, Belgian priest, physicist, and astronomer (born 1894)
- 1969 – Bishnu Prasad Rabha, Indian artist, painter, actor, dancer, writer, music composer and politician (born 1909)
- 1974 – Horace Lindrum, Australian snooker player (born 1912)
- 1975 – Suzanne Comhaire-Sylvain, Haitian anthropologist (born 1898)
- 1978 – Mark Robson, Canadian-American director and producer (born 1913)
- 1984 – Estelle Winwood, English actress (born 1883)
- 1995 – Emil Cioran, Romanian-French philosopher and educator (born 1911)
- 1997 – Cahit Külebi, Turkish poet and author (born 1917)
- 1999 – Clifton Fadiman, American game show host, author, and critic (born 1902)
- 2002 – Erwin Chargaff, Austrian-American biochemist and academic (born 1905)
- 2002 – Tinus Osendarp, Dutch runner (born 1916)
- 2004 – Jim Bacon, Australian politician, 41st Premier of Tasmania (born 1950)
- 2005 – Larry Collins, American journalist, historian, and author (born 1929)
- 2005 – Jack Kilby, American physicist and engineer, Nobel Prize laureate (born 1923)
- 2010 – Roberto Rosato, Italian footballer (born 1943)
- 2010 – Harry B. Whittington, English palaeontologist and academic (born 1916)
- 2011 – Ryan Dunn, American television personality (born 1977)
- 2012 – Judy Agnew, Second Lady of the United States. (born 1921)
- 2012 – LeRoy Neiman, American painter (born 1921)
- 2012 – Heinrich IV, Prince Reuss of Köstritz (born 1919)
- 2012 – Andrew Sarris, American critic (born 1928)
- 2013 – Ingvar Rydell, Swedish footballer (born 1922)
- 2015 – Angelo Niculescu, Romanian footballer and manager (born 1921)
- 2015 – Miriam Schapiro, Canadian-American painter and sculptor (born 1923)
- 2017 – Prodigy, American music artist (born 1974)
- 2022 – Caleb Swanigan, American basketball player (born 1997)
- 2024 – Donald Sutherland, Canadian actor and producer (born 1935)
- 2024 – Taylor Wily, American actor, sumo wrestler and mixed martial artist (born 1968)

== Holidays and observances ==
- Christian feast day:
  - Adalbert of Magdeburg
  - Blessed Dermot O'Hurley
  - Florentina
  - John of Matera
  - Blessed Margareta Ebner
  - Methodius of Olympus
  - Pope Silverius
  - June 20 (Eastern Orthodox liturgics)
- Day of the National Flag (Argentina)
- Gas Sector Day (Azerbaijan)
- Martyrs' Day (Eritrea)
- West Virginia Day (West Virginia)
- World Refugee Day (International)
