= Pârâul Morii (Ier) =

- Location within Romania

Location
- Country: Romania
- Counties: Satu Mare County
- Villages: Petrești, Dindești

Physical characteristics
- Source: Petrești
- Mouth: Ier
  - coordinates: 47.5017°N 22.3936°E
- Length: 14 km (8.7 mi)
- Basin size: 38 km^{2} (15 sq mi)

Basin features
- Progression: Ier→ Barcău→ Crișul Repede→ Körös→ Tisza→ Danube→ Black Sea
- River code: III.1.44.33.28.5a

The Pârâul Morii is a right tributary of the river Ier in Romania. It flows into the Ier near Piru Nou. Its length is 14 km (8.7 mi) and its basin size is 38 km^{2} (15 sq mi).
