= Industrial School Group in Tășnad =

Tășnad Technological High School
- Liceul Tehnologic Tășnad

Location
- Strada Nicolae Bălcescu, Nr. 44/A; Tășnad, Satu Mare County 445300; Romania
- Coordinates: 47°28′38″N 22°35′0″E

Information
- Type: Public
- Established: September 1, 1958; 67 years ago
- Website: www.liceutasnad.eu

The Tășnad Technological High School (Romanian: Liceul Tehnologic Tășnad; Hungarian: Tasnádi Ipari Iskolaközpont) is a bilingual high school located at 44/A Nicolae Bălcescu Street, Tășnad, Romania, with both Romanian and Hungarian language classes. It was established on September 1, 1958.

== Former names ==
- Școala Medie (1958–1965)
- Liceul de Cultură Generală (1968–1975)
- Liceul Real-Umanist (1975–1976)
- Liceul Industrial (1976–1989)
- Liceul Teoretic (1989–1992)
- Grup Școlar Industrial (1992–2012)
- Liceul Tehnologic Tășnad (since 2012)
