= Reformed Church, Tășnad =

Church in Tăşnad, Romania

Coordinates: 47.47587°N 22.58238°E

Reformed Church
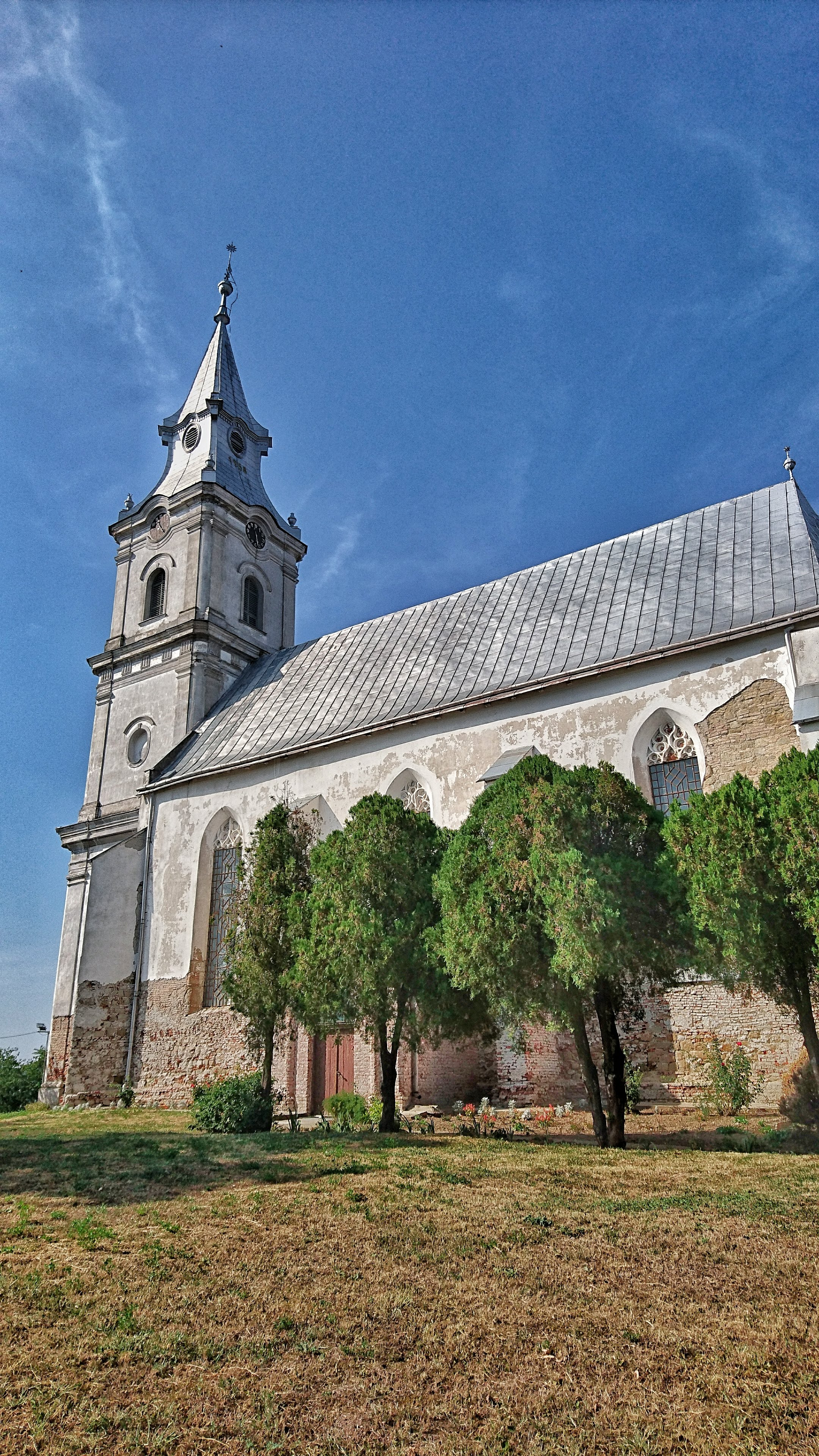

Religion
- Affiliation: Reformed Church in Romania
- Year consecrated: 1476

Location
- Municipality: Tăşnad
- Interactive map of Reformed Church

The Reformed Church (Romanian: Biserica Reformată; Hungarian: Református templom) is a church in Tăşnad, Romania, established in 1476.

== History ==
The Church was first consecrated in 1476. Originally a Roman Catholic church, it changed hands to the Reformed tradition in the 16th century. It was damaged by fire in 1660 and rebuilt temporarily in wood, then in the 18th century rebuilt in masonry with the tower and spire finally being completed in 1822.
