= PIR (gene) =

Protein-coding gene in the species Homo sapiens

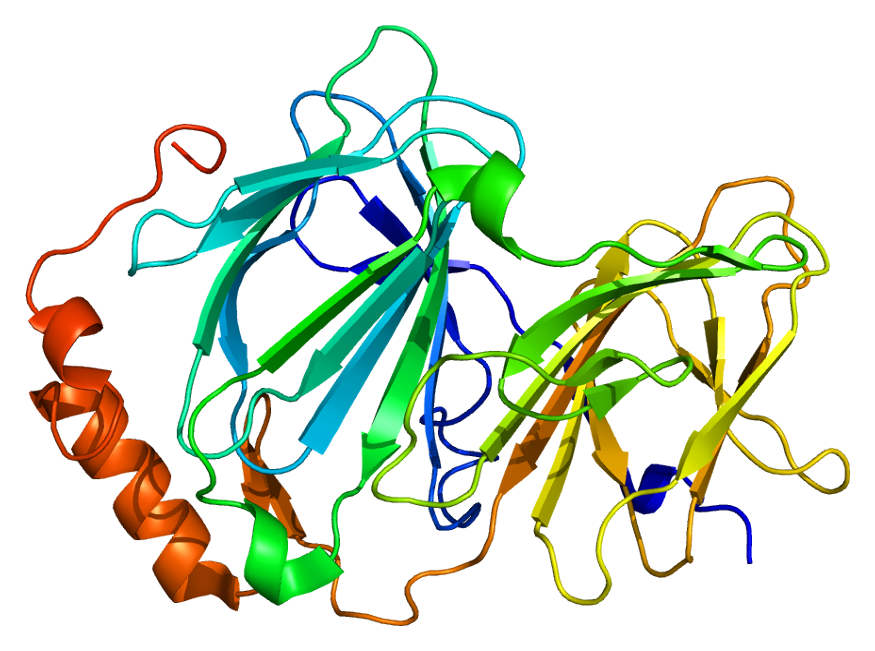

Identifiers
- Aliases: PIR, pirin
- External IDs: OMIM: 300931; MGI: 1916906; GeneCards: PIR
Available structures
PDB	Ortholog search: PDBe RCSB
PDB	List of PDB id codes 4ERO, 4EWD, 4GUL, 1J1L, 4EWA, 4HLT, 3ACL, 4EWE
Enzyme activity
EC #	BRENDA	ExPASy	KEGG	MetaCyc
1.13.11.24	↗	↗	↗	↗

Gene location (Human)
Chr.	X chromosome (human)
Band	Xp22.2	Start	15,384,799 bp
Band	Xp22.2	End	15,493,564 bp

Gene location (Mouse)
Chr.	X chromosome (mouse)
Band	X|X F5	Start	163,052,367 bp
Band	X|X F5	End	163,156,007 bp
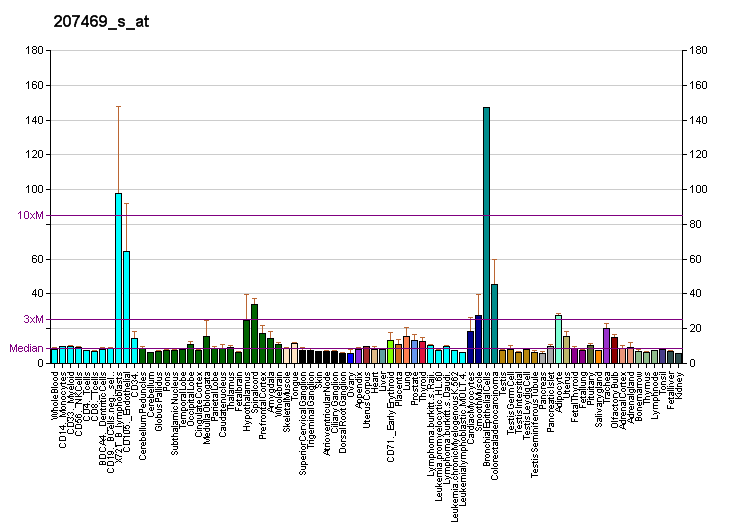
RNA expression pattern
Bgee	Human / Mouse (ortholog); Top expressed in: C1 segment; gonad; right lung; right adrenal gland; right adrenal cortex; urinary bladder; olfactory zone of nasal mucosa; left adrenal gland; left adrenal cortex; islet of Langerhans / Top expressed in: esophagus; lumbar spinal ganglion; olfactory epithelium; embryo; left lobe of liver; lip; right lung; conjunctival fornix; transitional epithelium of urinary bladder; right lung lobe; More reference expression data
BioGPS	More reference expression data
Gene ontology
Molecular function	oxidoreductase activity; protein binding; transcription coregulator activity; dioxygenase activity; metal ion binding; quercetin 2,3-dioxygenase activity
Cellular component	cytoplasm; nucleus; cytosol; nucleoplasm
Biological process	myeloid cell differentiation; regulation of transcription, DNA-templated; monocyte differentiation; transcription by RNA polymerase II; transcription, DNA-templated; digestion; regulation of nucleic acid-templated transcription
Sources:Amigo / QuickGO
Orthologs
Databases	NCBI: entry; OMA: entry
Species	Human	Mouse
Entrez	8544	69656
Ensembl	ENSG00000087842	ENSMUSG00000031379
UniProt	O00625	Q9D711
RefSeq (mRNA)	NM_003662; NM_001018109	NM_001301402; NM_027153
RefSeq (protein)	NP_001018119; NP_003653	NP_001288331; NP_081429
Location (UCSC)	Chr X: 15.38 – 15.49 Mb	Chr X: 163.05 – 163.16 Mb
PubMed search
- Wikidata
View/Edit Human	View/Edit Mouse

Pirin is a protein that in humans is encoded by the PIR gene.

This gene encodes a member of the cupin superfamily. The encoded protein is a Fe(II)-containing nuclear protein expressed in all tissues of the body and concentrated within dot-like subnuclear structures. Interactions with nuclear factor I/CCAAT box transcription factor as well as B cell lymphoma 3-encoded oncoprotein suggest the encoded protein may act as a transcriptional cofactor and be involved in the regulation of DNA transcription and replication. Alternatively spliced transcript variants have been described.

== Interactions ==
PIR (gene) has been shown to interact with BCL3.

== Pirin in bacteria ==
The pir gene is conserved in both bacteria and eukaryotes. In Pseudomonas stutzeri this protein exhibited quercetinase activity. In Streptomyces ambofaciens, a strain known to produce the antibiotic spiramycin, the pirA gene regulates the AcdB enzyme that catalyzes one of the first steps of beta-oxidation. Loss of the pirA gene causes a metabolic imbalance that reduces the amount of antibiotic produced. AcdB produces oxygen free radicals that influence the activity of PirA. PirA of Streptomyces ambofaciens has been shown to regulate the response to oxidative stress by binding to CatR, the catalase A regulator, thereby linking oxidative stress to beta-oxidation regulation.
