= Rât (Ier) =

- Location within Romania

Location
- Country: Romania
- Counties: Satu Mare, Bihor
- Villages: Vășad, Galoșpetreu

Physical characteristics
- Mouth: Ier
  - location: Sălacea
  - coordinates: 47.4669°N 22.2764°E
- Length: 17 km (11 mi)
- Basin size: 164 km^{2} (63 sq mi)

Basin features
- Progression: Ier→ Barcău→ Crișul Repede→ Körös→ Tisza→ Danube→ Black Sea
- Tributaries
  - left: Ierul Morii
  - right: Ganoș
- River code: III.1.44.33.28.9

The Rât is a right tributary of the river Ier in Romania. It flows into the Ier near Sălacea. Its length is 17 km (11 mi) and its basin size is 164 km^{2} (63 sq mi).
