= Iuliu Coroianu =

Romanian lawyer and activist

Iuliu Coroianu (14 June 1847 – 30 March 1927) was an Imperial Austrian-born Romanian lawyer and activist.

== Biography ==
Born in Craidorolț, Szatmár County, his father Demetriu was a priest, while his mother Iuliana Pop was the daughter of a priest; the family belonged to the Romanian Greek-Catholic Church. From 1850 to 1873, the elder Coroianu, a participant in the Blaj Assembly, served at Șimleu Silvaniei, where he was active in cultural affairs. Aside from Iuliu, he had a son, Sabin, and a daughter, Clara.

By 1889, Iuliu Coroianu was a noted lawyer. That year, he defended Vasile Lucaciu in court at Satu Mare, securing an acquittal. A prominent member of the Romanian National Party, he belonged to its executive from 1884 to 1894. He and Lucaciu drafted, printed and distributed the Transylvanian Memorandum abroad in 1892. During the collective trial held at Cluj two years later, Coroianu tenaciously defended himself, even continuing to stand and set forth his argument after being ordered by the bench to remain silent. Found guilty of conspiracy against the public order, he was sentenced to two years and eight months at hard labor and imprisoned at Szeged.

He was an active participant in the preparation and proceedings of the Great National Assembly at Alba Iulia that proclaimed the union of Transylvania with Romania in December 1918. Upon his death in 1927, Coroianu was buried in Cluj's Hajongard cemetery. A memorial bust was unveiled at Craidorolț in 1994.
