= Pirs =

PIRs, PIRS, Pirs, or pirs may mean:

- the plural of pir (disambiguation) or PIR
- Pirs (ISS module), a former module of the International Space Station
- a Russian word, Пирс, meaning "pier"
- Propulsion Information Retrieval System, part of the Chemical Propulsion Information Analysis Center
- Police Information Retrieval System, an information system used by the Royal Canadian Mounted Police
- Programme d'indicateurs du rendement scolaire du Conseil des ministres de l'Éducation, a program of the Ministry of Education, Recreation and Sports (Quebec)
