= Ambobactin =

Identifiers
3D model (JSmol)	Interactive image
ChemSpider	78444436
PubChem CID	122213218
- InChI: InChI=1S/C59H77N13O19/c1-25(2)49(80)46-56(87)67-43(26(3)33-22-62-36-14-10-8-12-32(33)36)53(84)65-37(19-30-21-61-35-13-9-7-11-31(30)35)58(89)72-18-16-40(76)48(72)59(90)91-29(6)45(69-52(83)38(24-73)66-51(82)34(60)20-42(78)79)55(86)68-44(28(5)74)54(85)64-27(4)50(81)63-23-41(77)71-17-15-39(75)47(71)57(88)70-46/h7-14,19,21-22,25-29,34,38-40,43-49,61-62,73-76,80H,15-18,20,23-24,60H2,1-6H3,(H,63,81)(H,64,85)(H,65,84)(H,66,82)(H,67,87)(H,68,86)(H,69,83)(H,70,88)(H,78,79)/b37-19-/t26?,27-,28+,29+,34-,38-,39-,40+,43-,44-,45-,46-,47-,48-,49-/m0/s1 Key: JPKJEQMJEKKOJN-FUXDMUSUSA-N
- SMILES: C[C@@H]1[C@@H](C(=O)N[C@H](C(=O)N[C@H](C(=O)NCC(=O)N2CC[C@@H]([C@H]2C(=O)N[C@H](C(=O)N[C@H](C(=O)N/C(=C\C3=CNC4=CC=CC=C43)/C(=O)N5CC[C@H]([C@H]5C(=O)O1)O)C(C)C6=CNC7=CC=CC=C76)[C@H](C(C)C)O)O)C)[C@@H](C)O)NC(=O)[C@H](CO)NC(=O)[C@H](CC(=O)O)N

Properties
Chemical formula	C_{59}H_{77}N_{13}O_{19}
Molar mass	1272.337 g·mol^{−1}
- Except where otherwise noted, data are given for materials in their standard state (at 25 °C [77 °F], 100 kPa). Infobox references

Ambobactin is an depsipeptide antibiotic with the molecular formula C_{59}H_{77}N_{13}O_{19}. Ambobactin is produced by the bacterium Streptomyces ambofaciens.
