= Salcia (Ier) =

Tributary of the river Ier in Romania

- Location within Romania

Location
- Country: Romania
- Counties: Bihor County
- Towns: Valea lui Mihai, Șimian

Physical characteristics
- Mouth: Ier
  - location: Upstream of Săcueni
  - coordinates: 47.3893°N 22.0925°E
- Length: 26 km (16 mi)
- Basin size: 162 km^{2} (63 sq mi)

Basin features
- Progression: Ier→ Barcău→ Crișul Repede→ Körös→ Tisza→ Danube→ Black Sea
- Tributaries
  - left: Mouca
  - right: Șilindru
- River code: III.1.44.33.28.10

The Salcia is a right tributary of the river Ier in Romania. It flows into the Ier near Săcueni. Its length is 26 km (16 mi) and its basin size is 162 km^{2} (63 sq mi).
