= Tiream =

Tiream Mezőterem
- Commune
- Coat of arms

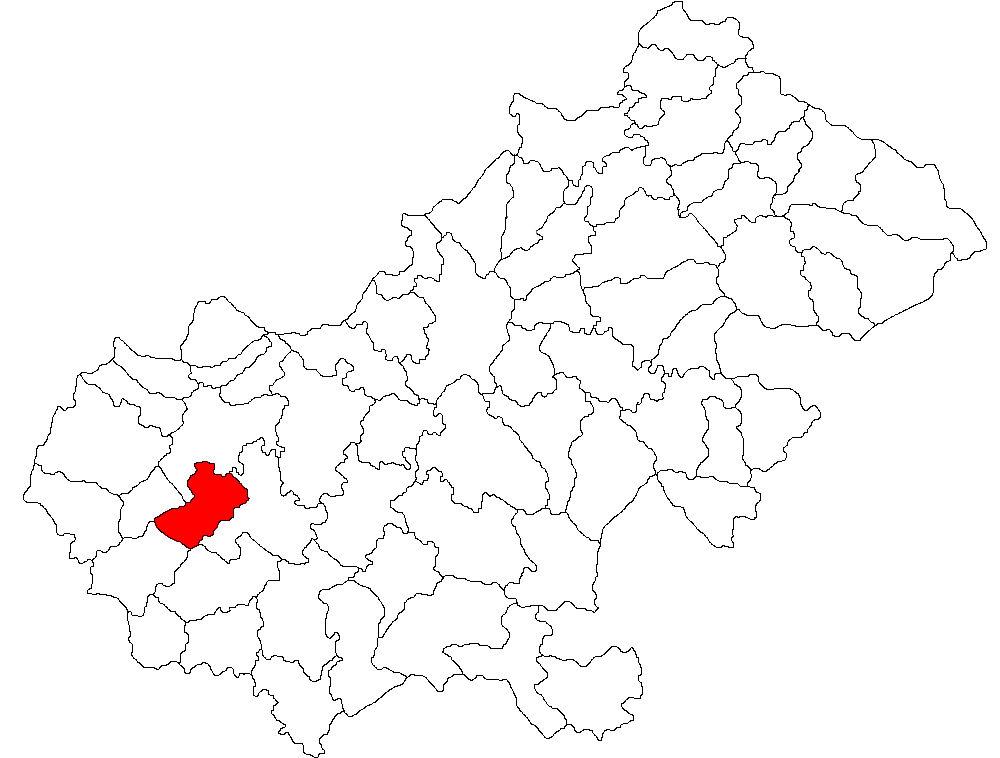
- Location in Satu Mare County

- Location in Romania
- Coordinates: 47°37′N 22°28′E
- Country: Romania
- County: Satu Mare

Government
  - Mayor (2024–2028): Nicolae Tar (PCM)
- Area: 53.25 km^{2} (20.56 sq mi)
- Elevation: 125 m (410 ft)
- Population (2021-12-01): 2,068
  - Density: 39/km^{2} (100/sq mi)
- Time zone: EET/EEST (UTC+2/+3)
- Postal code: 447325
- Area code: (+40) 02 61
- Vehicle reg.: SM
- Website: tiream.ro

Tiream (Hungarian: Mezőterem, Hungarian pronunciation: [ˈmɛzøːtɛrɛm]; German: Wiesenfeld, from 2002 on Terem) is a commune of 2,068 inhabitants situated in Satu Mare County, Romania. It is composed of three villages: Portița (Portelek), Tiream, and Vezendiu (Vezend).

The commune is located in the southwestern part of the county, on the banks of the river Sânmiclăuș.

== Administration ==
The current local council has the following political composition, based on the results of the votes cast at the 2024 Romanian local elections.

Party	Seats	Current Council
Democratic Alliance of Hungarians in Romania (UDMR/RMDSZ)	6	
Social Democratic Party (PSD)	2	
National Liberal Party (PNL)	1	
Alliance for the Union of Romanians (AUR)	1	
Democratic Forum of Germans in Romania (FDGR/DFDR)	1	

== Demographics ==
Historical population
Year	Pop.	±%
1850	2,905	—
1890	3,202	+10.2%
1900	3,488	+8.9%
1910	3,813	+9.3%
1920	3,636	−4.6%
1930	3,661	+0.7%
1941	3,768	+2.9%
1966	3,641	−3.4%
1977	3,114	−14.5%
1992	2,489	−20.1%
2002	2,358	−5.3%
2011	2,226	−5.6%
2021	2,068	−7.1%
Source:Census Database

At the 2002 census, Tiream had 2,358 inhabitants; of those, 48.3% were Romanians, 29.2% were Hungarians, 14.1% Germans (mainly Satu Mare Swabians), and 8.1% Roma. According to mother tongue, 50.1% of the population spoke Romanian, while 45.6% spoke Hungarian as their first language.

At the 2011 census, the commune had a population of 2,226, of which 41.06% were Romanians, 23.67% were Hungarians, 20.13% Roma, and 10.92% Germans. At the 2021 census, the population had decreased to 2,068, of which 41.05% were Romanians, 40.18% were Hungarians, 7.06% Roma, and 4.11% Germans.
