= Ierul Îngust =

- Location within Romania

Location
- Country: Romania
- Counties: Bihor County

Physical characteristics
- Mouth: Ier
  - location: Upstream of the Romanian-Hungarian border
  - coordinates: 47.2962°N 21.8899°E
- Length: 12 km (7.5 mi)
- Basin size: 43 km^{2} (17 sq mi)

Basin features
- Progression: Ier→ Barcău→ Crișul Repede→ Körös→ Tisza→ Danube→ Black Sea
- River code: III.1.44.33.28.11

The Ierul Îngust is a right tributary of the river Ier in Romania. It flows into the Ier near Diosig, close to the Hungarian border. Its length is 12 km (7.5 mi) and its basin size is 43 km^{2} (17 sq mi).
