= Moftin oil field =

Oil field in Satu Mare County, Romania

Moftin
- Country: Romania
- Region: Satu Mare County
- Offshore/onshore: onshore
- Operator: Rompetrol

Field history
- Discovery: 2012
- Start of development: 2012
- Start of production: 2014

Production
- Current production of oil: 500 barrels per day (~25,000 t/a)
- Estimated oil in place: 2.7 million tonnes (~ 3×10^{6} m^{3} or 20 million bbl)

The Moftin oil field is an oil field located in Moftin, Satu Mare County. It was discovered in 2012 and developed by Rompetrol. It will begin production in 2014 and will produce oil. The total proven reserves of the Moftin oil field are around 20 million barrels (2.7 million tonnes), and production is centered on 500 barrels per day (79 m^{3}/d).
