= Endre Ady =

Hungarian poet

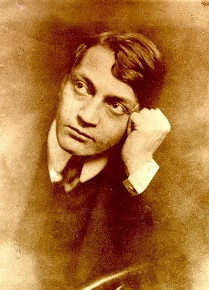
- Born: Endre András Ady; 22 November 1877; Érmindszent, Austria-Hungary (now Ady Endre, Romania)
- Died: 27 January 1919 (aged 41); Budapest, Hungary
- Resting place: Kerepesi Cemetery, Budapest
- Education: Wesselényi Reformed College, Zilah (1892–1896); Reformed College of Debrecen (1896–1897); University of Budapest (1897–1898)
- Occupations: Poet, journalist, writer
- Years active: 1899–1918
- Movement: Symbolism
- Spouse: Berta Boncza (m. 1915–1919)
- Parents: Lőrinc Ady (father); Mária Pásztor (mother)

Endre Ady (Hungarian: diósadi Ady András Endre, archaic English: Andrew Ady; 22 November 1877 – 27 January 1919) was a turn-of-the-century Hungarian poet and journalist. Regarded by many as the greatest Hungarian poet of the 20th century, he was noted for his steadfast belief in social progress and development and for his poetry's exploration of fundamental questions of the modern European experience: love, temporality, faith, individuality, and patriotism.

== Biography ==
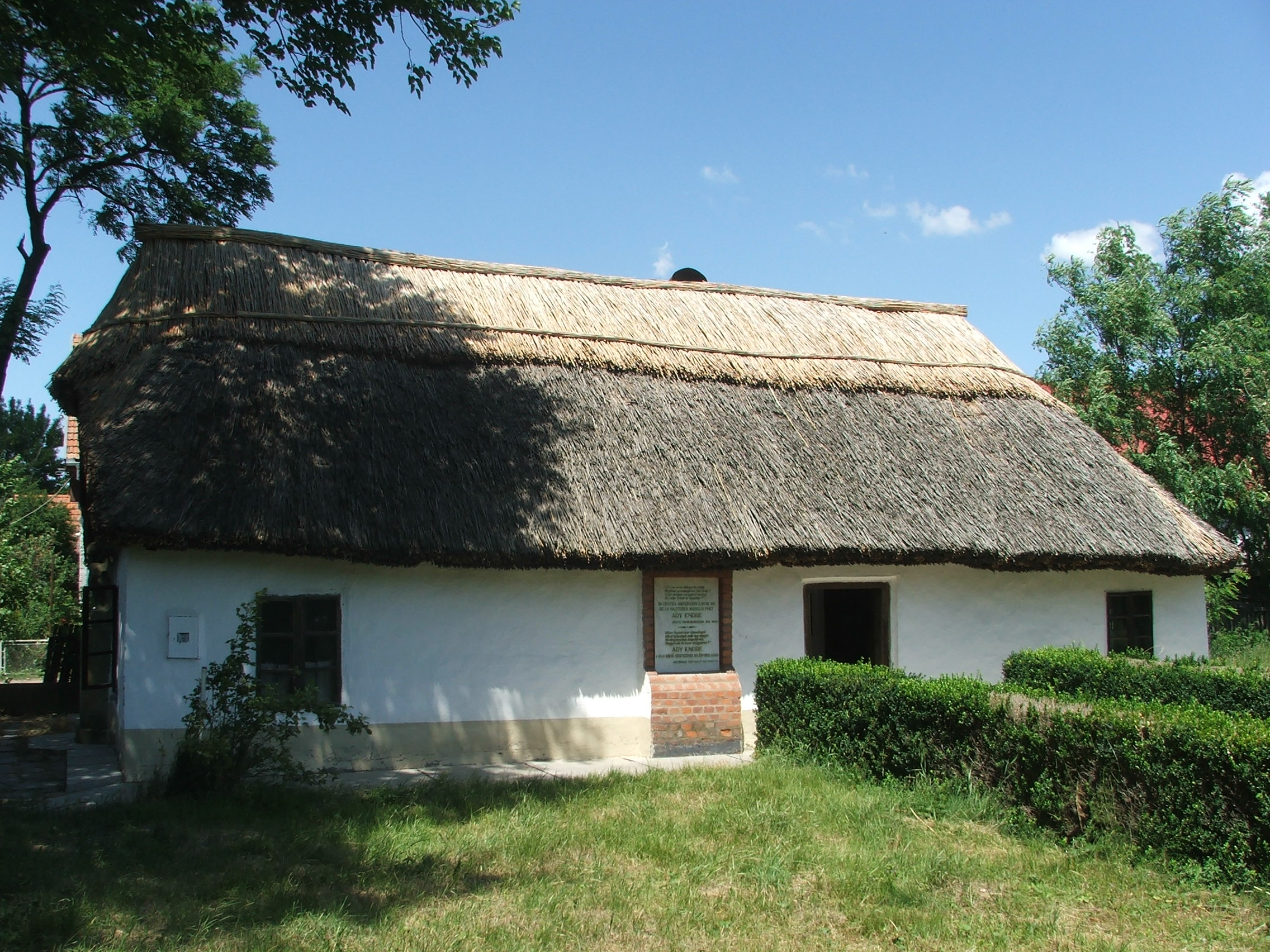
The house in Érmindszent, Szilágy County where Endre Ady was born

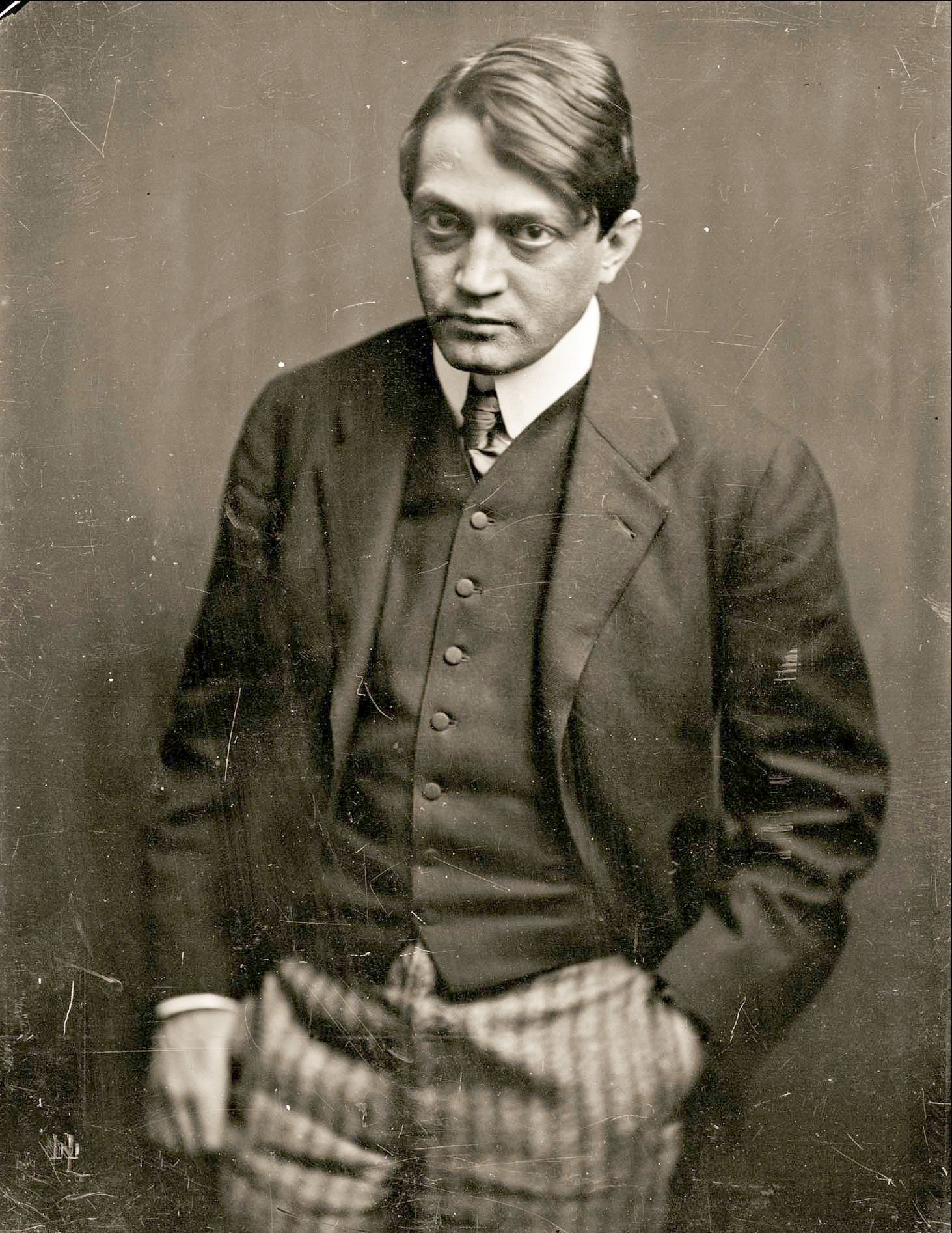
Endre Ady in 1908

Ady was born in Érmindszent, Szilágy County (part of Austria-Hungary at the time; now a village in Căuaș commune, Satu Mare County, Romania, called Adyfalva in Hungarian and Ady Endre in Romanian). He belonged to an impoverished Calvinist noble family. Endre was the second of three children. The eldest, a girl named Ilona, died at an early age. The author and poet Mariska Ady (1888–1977) was a niece of Endre Ady.

Between 1892 and 1896, Ady attended the Calvinist College in Zilah (today Zalău, Romania). On 22 March 1896, he published his first poem in the Zilah newspaper Szilágy.

He later studied law at the Reformed College in Debrecen. After dropping out, he became a journalist. He published his first poems in a volume called Versek (Poems) in 1899. He soon grew tired of Debrecen (the town later became a symbol of backwardness in his poetry) and moved to Nagyvárad (today Oradea, Romania), a city with a rich cultural life. In articles written in 1902 for the local newspaper Nagyváradi Napló, Ady paid close attention to the social features of his time. "Wesselényi and a poor peasant! Perhaps unwittingly, master Fadrusz has carved a satire", he wrote, referring to the unveiling of the Wesselényi Monument.

Working as a journalist and spending time with like-minded people broadened his horizons. He published a new collection of poems in 1903, but remained relatively unknown. The turning point came in August 1903 when he met Adél Brüll Diósy, a wealthy, married Jewish woman who was living in Paris at the time but was visiting her home in Nagyvárad. Léda (as he called her in his poems) became his muse; his love for her and their visit to Paris, helped him to develop his talent. He visited Paris seven times between 1904 and 1911. When he returned after his first visit (which lasted for a year), he moved to Budapest and began work for the newspaper Budapesti Napló (Budapest Journal), where he published more than 500 articles and plenty of poems.

Being interested in politics, Ady became a member of the radical group Huszadik Század (Twentieth Century, or possibly Twentieth Brigade). In 1906 he published his third book of poetry, Új versek (New Poems), which is a landmark in literature and marks the birth of modern Hungarian poetry. His fourth collection, Vér és arany (Blood and Gold), brought him real success and critical acclaim.

In 1906 Ady decided to leave the country and went to Paris again. In 1907, he had to quit his job at Budapesti Napló.

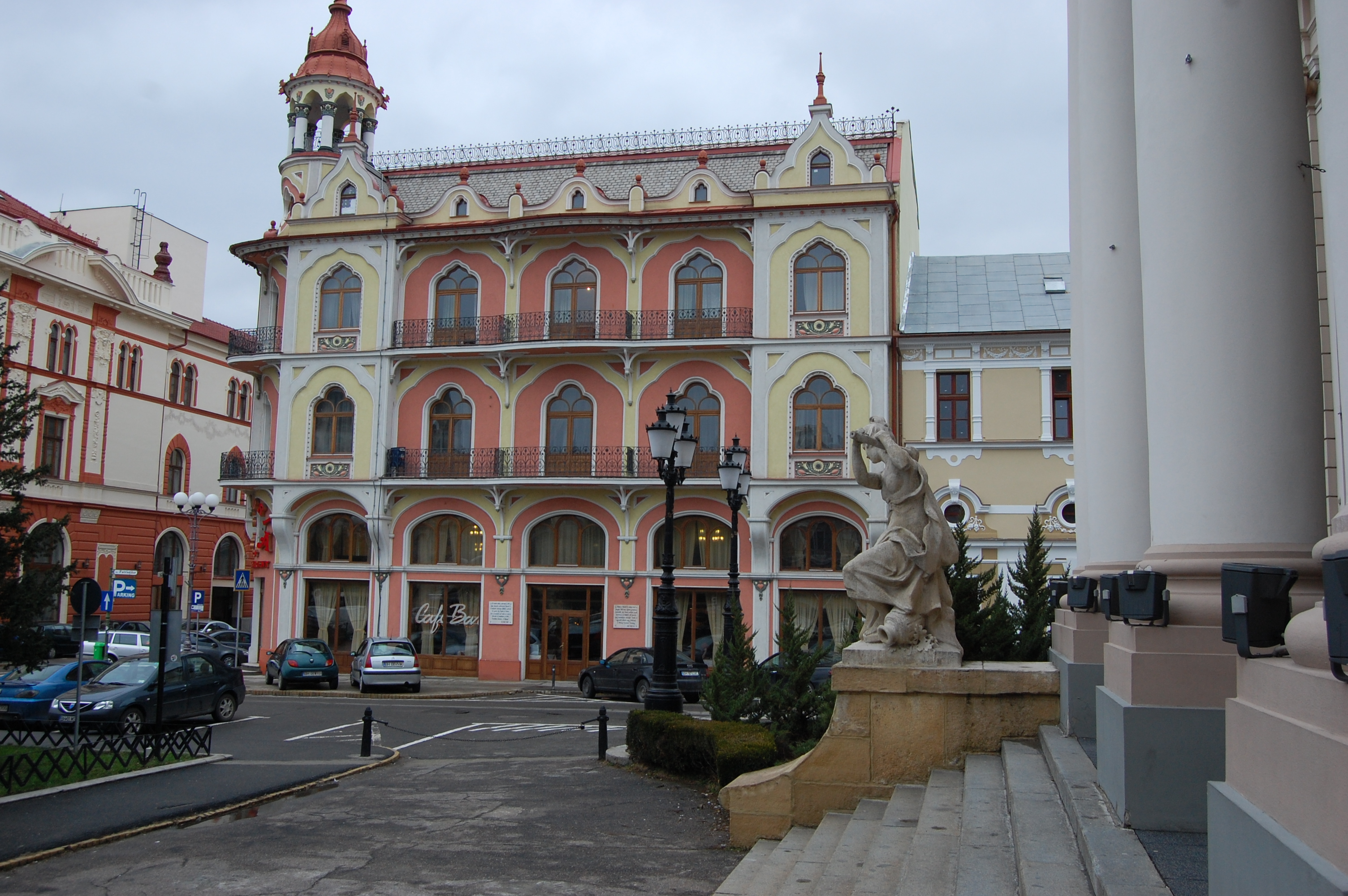
Building of the former EMKE cafe, favorite place of Ady. Here was founded the literary circle called "A Holnap" (Tomorrow)

Funeral procession of Endre Ady at the National Museum on 29 January 1919

In 1908, the first issue of a new periodical called Nyugat (The West) published a poem and an essay by him. He worked for this periodical for the rest of his life; from 1912 he was one of the editors. Also in 1908 in Nagyvárad, he was one of the founders of a literary circle called A Holnap (Tomorrow). The group published an anthology of poems of Ady and others including Mihály Babits, Gyula Juhász and Béla Balázs. The poems of this anthology met with disapproval and incomprehension. Many people attacked the anthology for containing erotic poems. In addition, Ady was criticised for his unpatriotic feelings in a poem in which he emphasized the contrast between the rich cultural life he longed for and the cruel realities of the Hungarian peasant world.

Ady disliked his name being linked with other poets, whom he thought were jumping on his bandwagon. He wrote a short story, "The duk-duk affair", in which he mocked those who were following the trend he was setting.

Ady was an editor and leading figure of Nyugat (West), an important Hungarian literary journal. He also wrote political articles for other journals criticizing the political situation of the time. He did not like the nationalism of the leading parties, but also criticised the anti-nationalism of the social democrats; he knew how far Hungary was behind the more developed countries, but clearly saw the faults of Western countries too.

From 1909 he often needed sanitarium treatment for his health, which was undermined by syphilis. The political situation became critical: the workers were protesting against the government, and Ady saw a revolution approaching. His personal life was also in crisis; his affair with Léda became more and more burdensome. As Ady become a prominent poet, Léda lost her leading role in the relationship. He broke up with her in April 1912.

In 1914, he met the 20-year-old Berta Boncza, with whom he had been corresponding since 1911. In 1915 they married without her father's permission. In his poems he called her "Csinszka".

== Last years ==
After the assassination of Archduke Franz Ferdinand in 1914, Ady saw war approaching. Everyone he knew was enthusiastic about the war, and he was left alone with his fears and worries about the future. He published his last book of poetry in 1918. He was terminally ill when he wrote his last poem, "Üdvözlet a győzőnek" (Greetings to the victor). Syphilis had weakened his aorta, so that he might die at any moment from a massive haemorrhage. He was elected president of the Vörösmarty Academy, an organization of modern writers, but could not deliver his opening speech; he died in Budapest on 27 January 1919, and was buried in the city's Kerepesi Cemetery.

== Poetry ==
At the beginning of the 20th century, Hungarian poets tried to follow the folksy style of Sándor Petőfi, but most lacked his vision and talent; the style did not renew itself. Ady was the first to break from this tradition into a modern style. Although he liked to identify as a lonely, misunderstood revolutionary, most of the poets of his generation supported him, and many imitated his style.

His first two books of poetry did not show anything new; he was still under the influence of 19th-century poets such as Petőfi or János Vajda. The first elements of his own style appeared not in his poems but in his essays and other writings.

Ady was undoubtedly influenced by the works of Baudelaire and Verlaine. He often used Symbolist techniques; his recurring themes are God, Hungarian identity, and the struggle for survival in modern society. Other themes are present only in certain periods of his life (money, life and death, Léda).

== Works ==
- Versek ("Poems", 1899)
- Még egyszer ("Once Again", 1903)
- Új versek ("New Poems", 1906)
- Vér és arany ("Blood and Gold", 1907)
- Az Illés szekerén ("On Elijah's Chariot", 1909)
- Szeretném, ha szeretnének ("I'd Love to Be Loved" 1910)
- A Minden-Titkok versei ("The Poems of All Secrets", 1911)
- A menekülő Élet ("The Fleeing Life", 1912)
- Margita élni akar ("Margita Wants to Live", 1912)
- A magunk szerelme ("Our Own Love", 1913)
- Ki látott engem? ("Who Have Seen Me?", 1914)
- A halottak élén ("Leading the Dead", 1918)
- Az utolsó hajók ("The Last Ships", 1923)

== Honors ==
A postage stamp bearing Ady's likeness was issued 15 March 1947 by Hungary in a series of Hungarian freedom-fighters, and from 1969 to 1990 he appeared on the 500 forint banknotes. Another commemorative stamp was issued 27 January 1969 on the 50th anniversary of his death, and another on 22 November 1977 on his birth centenary, along with a mini-sheet. Romania issued a commemorative postage stamp in his honor on 5 December 1957, on the 80th anniversary his birth.

In 1960, a statue of Endre Ady by Géza Csorba was erected on Liszt Ferenc tér in Budapest. Another bust of Ady, also sculpted by Géza Csorba, was installed in the courtyard of Innis College in Toronto in 1984.
