= Streptomyces ambofaciens =

Scientific classification
- Domain: Bacteria
- Kingdom: Bacillati
- Phylum: Actinomycetota
- Class: Actinomycetia
- Order: Streptomycetales
- Family: Streptomycetaceae
- Genus: Streptomyces
- Species: S. ambofaciens

Binomial name
- Streptomyces ambofaciens Pinnert-Sindico 1954

Type strain
- AS 4.1528, ATCC 23877, BCC 7029, BCRC (formerly CCRC) 11857, BCRC 11857, CBS 616.68, CCRC 11857, CECT 3101, CGMCC 4.1528, Despois 3486, DSM 40053, ETH 8703, IFO (now NBRC) 12836, IFO 12836, ISP 5053, JCM 4204, JCM 4618, KACC 20005, KCC S-0204, KCC S-0618, KCTC 9111, NBIMCC 1863, NBRC 12651, NBRC 12836, NRRL B-2516, NRRL-ISP 5053, Rhone-Poulenc 3486, RIA 1115, Sauche 3486

Species of bacterium

Streptomyces ambofaciens is a bacterium species from the genus Streptomyces which has been isolated from soil from France. Streptomyces ambofaciens produces ambobactin, foromacidin A, foromacidin B, foromacidin C, 18-deoxospiramicin I, 17-methylenespiramycin I and congocidin.

== See also ==
- List of Streptomyces species
