= Zoltán Sztáray =

Zoltán Sztáray (June 20, 1918 – April 20, 2011) was one of the better known contemporary writers of the Hungarian emigration. He was imprisoned in the Recsk forced labor camp for many months (or years) until he escaped and moved to the United States. He was born in Magyarcsaholy, Kingdom of Hungary (now Cehal, Romania), and died in Portland, Oregon.

== Works ==
- Souvenirs du camp de concentration de Recsk, Paris, 1957
- From Agricultural Labourer to Smallholder, 1936-1956, Brussels, 1959
- The Crushing of Hungarian Scouting, New York City, 1959
- Hungary. A Survey July 1958-July 1959, New York City, 1959
- A természetes szaporodás visszaesése Magyarországon, New York City, 1960
- Hungary. A Survey. Vol. 2., New York City, 1960
- Books on the Hungarian Revolution, Brussels, 1960
- Bibliography on Hungary, New York City, 1960
- Birth control in Hungary since 1956, Brussels, 1961
- Haraszthy Ágoston, a kaliforniai szőlőkultúra atyja, San Bernardino, CA, 1964
- A bukaresti titkos szerződés. Hogyan adták el Erdélyt az antanthatalmak?, München, 1980
- A recski kényszermunkatábor, München, 1981
- Hudson-parti álom, New York City, 1985
- Haraszthy Ágoston, New York City, 1986

== Awards ==
- István Bibó Award, Boston, 1983
- Jus Humana Award, 1991, U.S.
- A Magyar Köztársasági Érdemrend tisztikeresztje, Budapest, 1991
- 1956-os Emlékérem, Budapest, 1991
- Nagy Imre-emlékplakett, Budapest, 1994.
- Elnöki Arany Emlékérem, Budapest, 1996.
- Szabad Magyarországért Emléklap, Budapest, 1999.
- Magyar Köztársasági Érdemrend Középkeresztje a csillaggal, Budapest, 2003.
- A Szabadság Hőse emlékérem, Budapest, 2006.
