= Pocsaj =

Coordinates: 47°17′N 21°49′E

- Large village
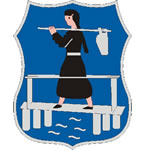
- Coat of arms
- Interactive map of Pocsaj
- Country: Hungary
- County: Hajdú-Bihar
- District: Derecske

Area
  - Total: 49.55 km^{2} (19.13 sq mi)

Population (2015)
  - Total: 2,642
  - Density: 53.4/km^{2} (138/sq mi)
- Time zone: UTC+1 (CET)
  - Summer (DST): UTC+2 (CEST)
- Postal code: 4125
- Area code: (+36) 54

Pocsaj (Romanian: Pocei) is a village in Hajdú-Bihar county, in the Northern Great Plain region of eastern Hungary.

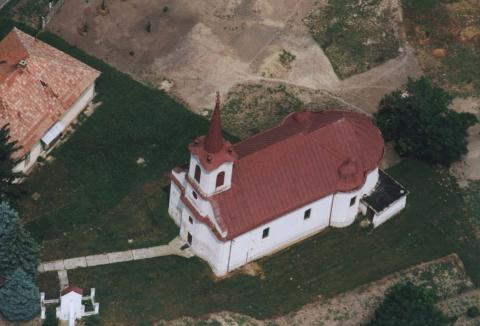
Aerial photography of a church in Pocsaj

== Geography ==
It covers an area of 96.59 km^{2} (37 sq mi) and has a population of 2642 people (2015).
