= Tășnad =

Tășnad Tasnád
- Town
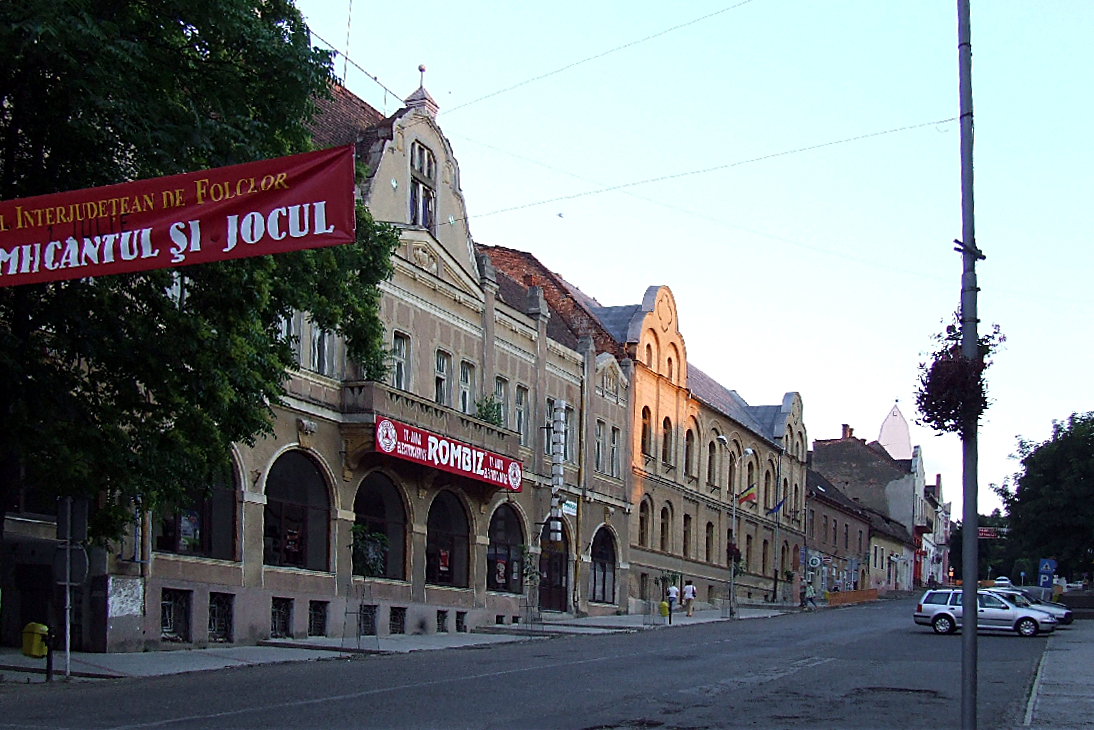
- Street in Tășnad

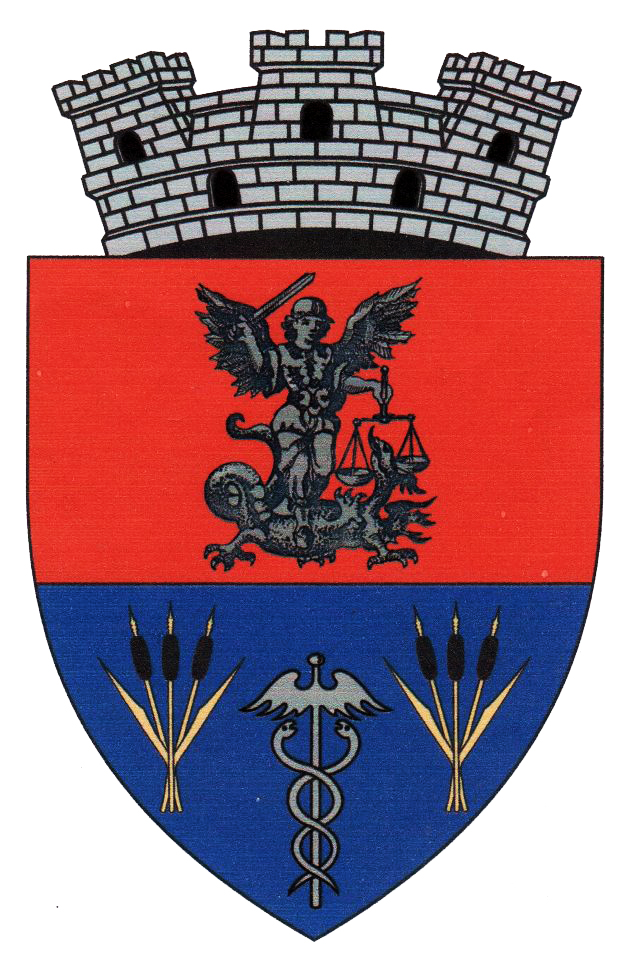
- Coat of arms

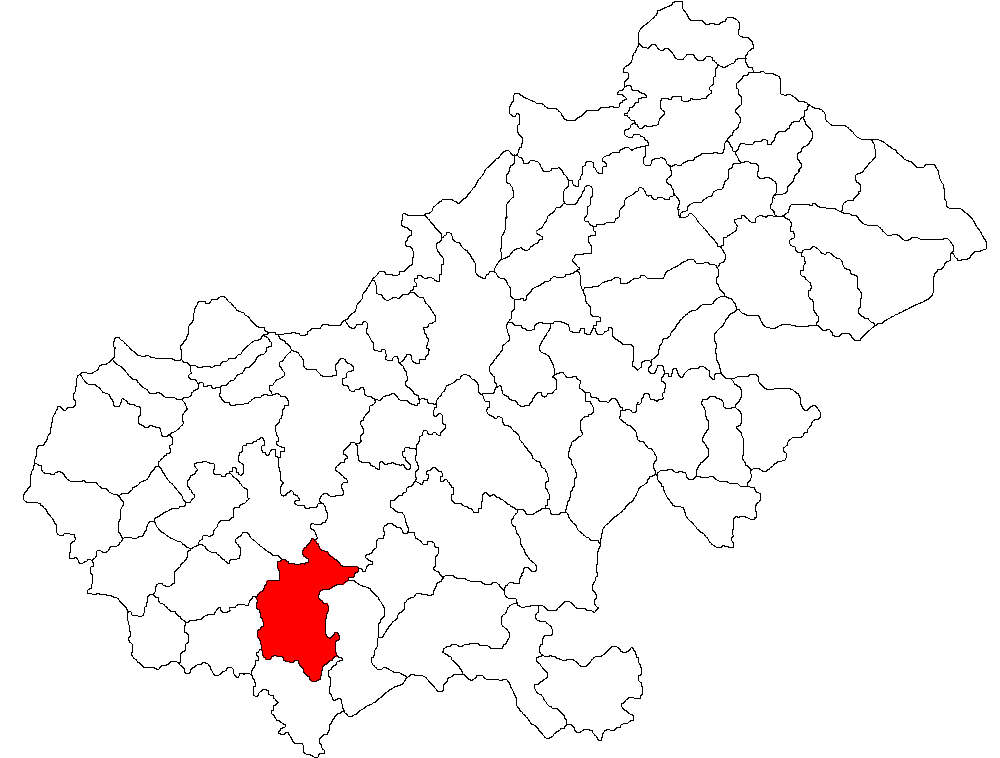
- Location in Satu Mare County

- Location in Romania
- Coordinates: 47°28′38″N 22°35′2″E
- Country: Romania
- County: Satu Mare

Government
  - Mayor (2024–2028): Adrian-Dănuț Farcău
- Area: 96.60 km^{2} (37.30 sq mi)
- Elevation: 129 m (423 ft)
- Population (2021-12-01): 8,058
  - Density: 83.42/km^{2} (216.0/sq mi)
- Time zone: UTC+02:00 (EET)
  - Summer (DST): UTC+03:00 (EEST)
- Postal code: 445300
- Area code: (+40) 02 61
- Vehicle reg.: SM
- Website: www.tasnad.ro

Tășnad (Romanian pronunciation: [təʃˈnad]; Hungarian: Tasnád, Hungarian pronunciation: [ˈtɒʃnaːd]; German: Trestenburg) is a town in Satu Mare County, Crișana, Romania. It administers five villages: Blaja (Tasnádbalázsháza), Cig (Csög), Rațiu (Ráctanya), Sărăuad (Tasnádszarvad), and Valea Morii (Tasnádmalomszeg).

The town lies on the banks of the river Santău. At about 2 km (1.2 mi) from the center lies the Tășnad geothermal Spa, known in Romania and abroad for its thermal waters.

== Demographics ==
Historical population
Year	Pop.	±%
1850	5,213	—
1880	5,185	−0.5%
1890	5,684	+9.6%
1900	6,636	+16.7%
1910	7,603	+14.6%
1920	7,551	−0.7%
1930	7,737	+2.5%
1941	8,124	+5.0%
1956	8,231	+1.3%
1966	8,859	+7.6%
1977	9,934	+12.1%
1992	10,399	+4.7%
2002	10,188	−2.0%
2011	8,411	−17.4%
2021	8,058	−4.2%
Source: Census data

At the 2011 census, there were 8,411 people living within the city; of those, 51.1% were ethnic Romanians, while 36.2% are ethnic Hungarians, 11.4% ethnic Romani, and 1,1% others. At the 2021 census, Tășnad had a population of 8,058, of which 50.48% were Romanians, 27.93% Hungarians, and 14.36% Roma.

As of 2022, the city contains the Reformed Church, a Baptist Church, the Orthodox cathedral, a Roman Catholic church, and a Greek Catholic church.

Dr. Abraham Fuchs wrote a comprehensive historical book about Tășnad as it was up to World War II. The book is in Hebrew and describes the vibrant Jewish life in this small town up until its destruction in 1944.

== History ==
At the archaeological site of Tășnad-Sere in the Spa-area, finds from the Neolithic Körös, Pișcolt, and Baden cultures have been made as well as remains from the late Iron Age and the migration period (Chernyakhov culture). Since 2012, Ulrike Sommer from the UCL Institute of Archaeology in London has conducted excavations of the Körös site together with the Satu Mare Museum. Until 1876, Tășnad was part of Közép-Szolnok County when it was incorporated in the newly formed Szilágy County of the Kingdom of Hungary.

After the collapse of Austria-Hungary at the end of World War I, and the declaration of the Union of Transylvania with Romania, the Romanian Army took control of Tășnad in April 1919, during the Hungarian–Romanian War. The city officially became part of the territory ceded to the Kingdom of Romania in June 1920 under the terms of the Treaty of Trianon. In August 1940, under the auspices of Nazi Germany, which imposed the Second Vienna Award, Hungary retook the territory of Northern Transylvania (which included Tășnad) from Romania. Towards the end of World War II, however, the city was taken back from Hungarian and German troops by Romanian and Soviet forces in October 1944.

== Natives ==
- Lajos Bíró (1856–1931), Hungarian zoologist
- George Copos (born 1953), businessman and politician
- Grigore Maior (1715–1785), Bishop of Făgăraș and Primate of the Romanian Greek Catholic Church
- Petri Mór (1863–1945), teacher, school inspector, and author
- Károly Nóti (1892–1954), Hungarian screenwriter

== Education ==
=== Schools ===
- Industrial School Group in Tășnad

== Twin cities ==
- Kispest, Hungary
