= Cehal =

Cehal Oláhcsaholy
- Commune
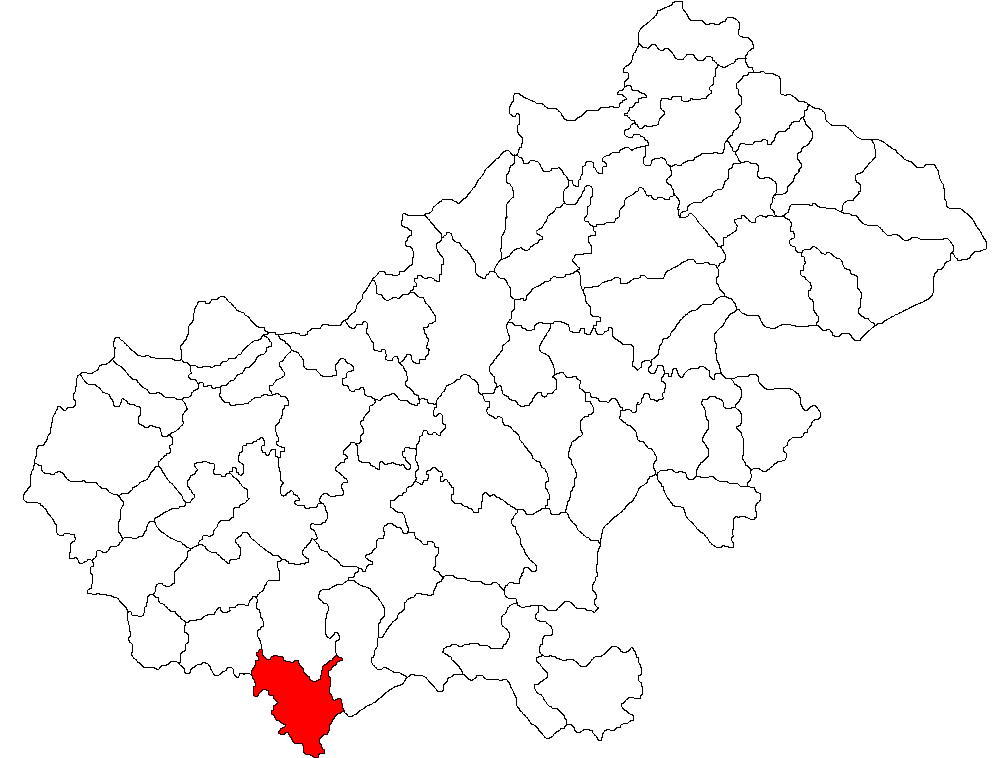
- Location in Satu Mare County

- Location in Romania
- Coordinates: 47°23′N 22°36′E
- Country: Romania
- County: Satu Mare

Government
  - Mayor (2020–2024): Gheorghe Jurchiș (PSD)
- Area: 65.43 km^{2} (25.26 sq mi)
- Elevation: 226 m (741 ft)
- Population (2021-12-01): 1,279
  - Density: 20/km^{2} (51/sq mi)
- Time zone: EET/EEST (UTC+2/+3)
- Postal code: 447095
- Area code: +(40) 261
- Vehicle reg.: SM
- Website: primariacehal.ro

Cehal (Hungarian: Oláhcsaholy, Hungarian pronunciation: [ˈolaːhtʃɒhoj]) is a commune situated in Satu Mare County, Crișana, Romania. It is composed of three villages: Cehal, Cehăluț (the commune center; Magyarcsaholy), and Orbău (Tasnádorbó).

== Demographics ==
At the 2011 census the commune had 1,594 inhabitants, of which 66.4% were Romanians and 33.3% Hungarians. At the 2021 census Cehal had a population of 1,279; of those, 62% were Romanians and 32% Hungarians.

== Natives ==
- Zoltán Sztáray (1918–2011), writer
