= Pir, Kerman =

Pir پير
- Village
- Location within Iran
- Coordinates: 28°39′46″N 56°47′41″E
- Country: Iran
- Province: Kerman
- County: Baft
- Bakhsh: Central
- Rural District: Dashtab

Population (2006)
  - Total: 303
- Time zone: UTC+3:30 (IRST)
  - Summer (DST): UTC+4:30 (IRDT)

Pir (Persian: پير, also Romanized as Pīr; also known as Piroo’eyeh, Pīrū, and Pīrū’īyeh) is a village in Dashtab Rural District, in the Central District of Baft County, Kerman Province, Iran. At the 2006 census, its population was 303, in 73 families.
