= Moftin =

Moftin Kismajtény
- Commune
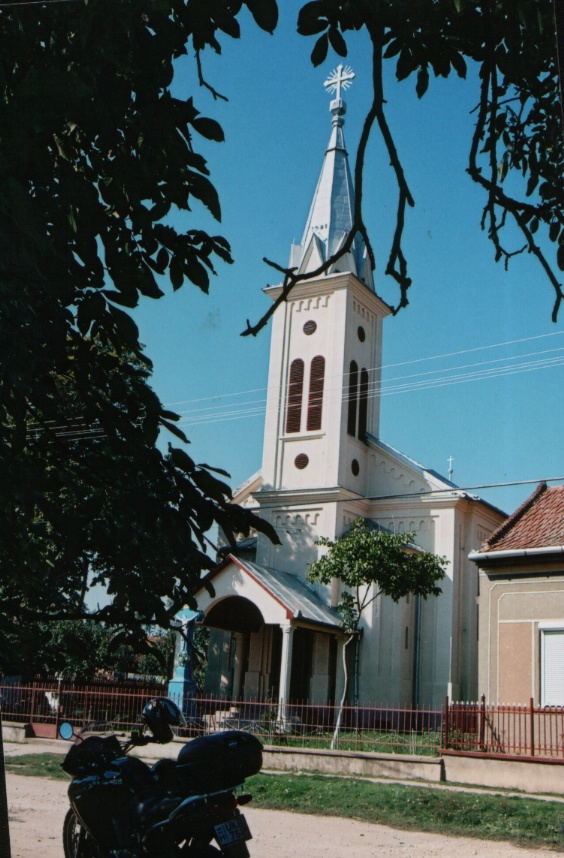
- Church in Domănești

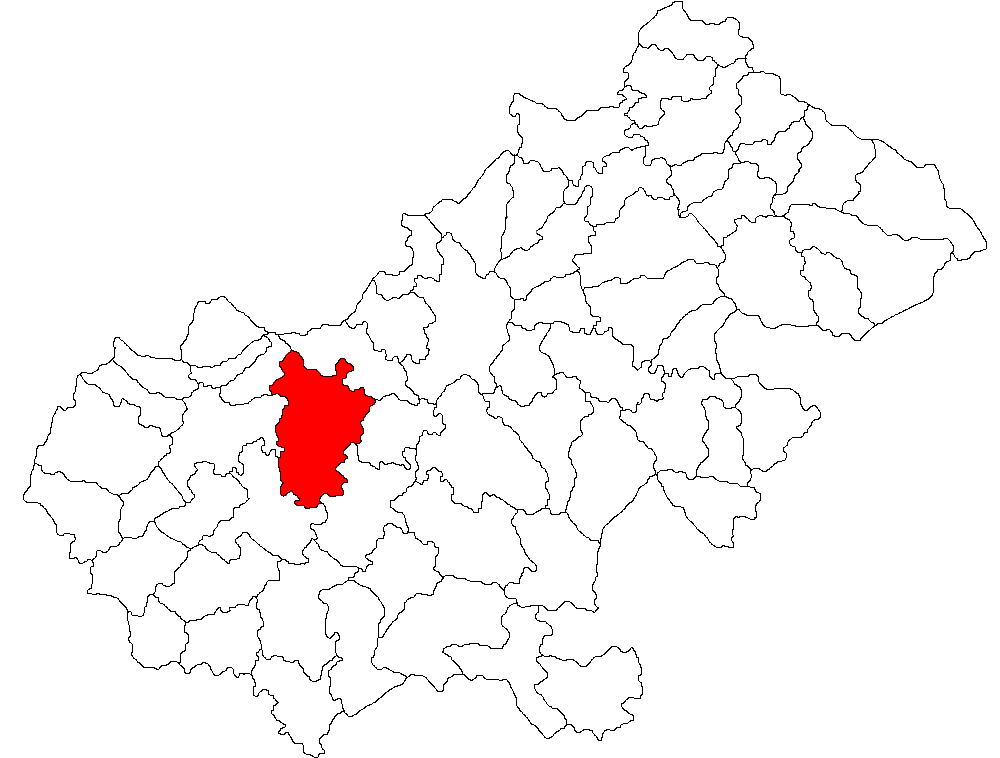
- Location in Satu Mare County

- Location in Romania
- Coordinates: 47.6875°N 22.6008°E
- Country: Romania
- County: Satu Mare

Government
  - Mayor (2020–2024): Gheorghe David (PSD)
- Area: 129.13 km^{2} (49.86 sq mi)
- Elevation: 120 m (390 ft)
- Population (2021-12-01): 4,222
  - Density: 32.70/km^{2} (84.68/sq mi)
- Time zone: UTC+02:00 (EET)
  - Summer (DST): UTC+03:00 (EEST)
- Postal code: 447200
- Vehicle reg.: SM
- Website: www.primariamoftin.ro

Moftin (Hungarian: Kismajtény, Hungarian pronunciation: [ˈkiʃmɒjteːɲ]; German: Kleinmaitingen) is a commune of 4,222 inhabitants situated in Satu Mare County, Romania. Its center is Moftinu Mic, and the commune is composed of seven villages: Domănești (Domahida), Ghilvaci (Gilvács), Ghirolt (Érgirolt), Istrău (Esztró), Moftinu Mare (Nagymajtény), Moftinu Mic, and Sânmiclăuș (Krasznaszentmiklós).

== Administration ==
The current local council has the following political composition, based on the results of the votes cast at the 2024 Romanian local elections.

Party	Seats	Current Council
Social Democratic Party (PSD)	7	
National Liberal Party (PNL)	2	
Democratic Alliance of Hungarians in Romania (UDMR/RMDSZ)	5	
Democratic Forum of Germans in Romania (FDGR/DFDR)	2	

== Geography ==
The commune is located in the south-western part of the county, at a distance of 8 km (5.0 mi) from Carei and 27 km (17 mi) from the county seat, Satu Mare, on European route E671. It borders the city of Carei and Căpleni commune to the west, Căuaș commune to the south, Terebești and Craidorolț communes to the east and Doba commune to the north.

== History ==
On 1 May 1711, at the end of Rákóczi's War of Independence, 12,000 rebels laid down their arms and took an oath of allegiance to the Emperor in the fields outside Kismajtény (Moftinu Mic).

== Economy ==
The Moftin oil field is located on the territory of the commune.

== Demographics ==
At the 2002 census, the commune had 4,328 inhabitants, of whom 57.39% were Romanians, 31.81% Hungarians, and 4.78% Roma; according to mother tongue, 53.65% spoke Romanian as their first language, while 44.59% spoke Hungarian. At the 2011 census, Moftin had a population of 4,293, of which 53.69% were Romanians, 26.48% Hungarians, 9.64% Roma, 4.52% Germans, and 2.14% Ukrainians. At the 2021 census, it had a population of 4,293, of which 53.08% were Romanians, 27.76% Hungarians, 8.83% Roma, 3.34% Germans, and 2.87% Ukrainians.

== Natives ==
- Silviu Lung (born 1956), football player and manager
