= Craidorolț =

- Commune
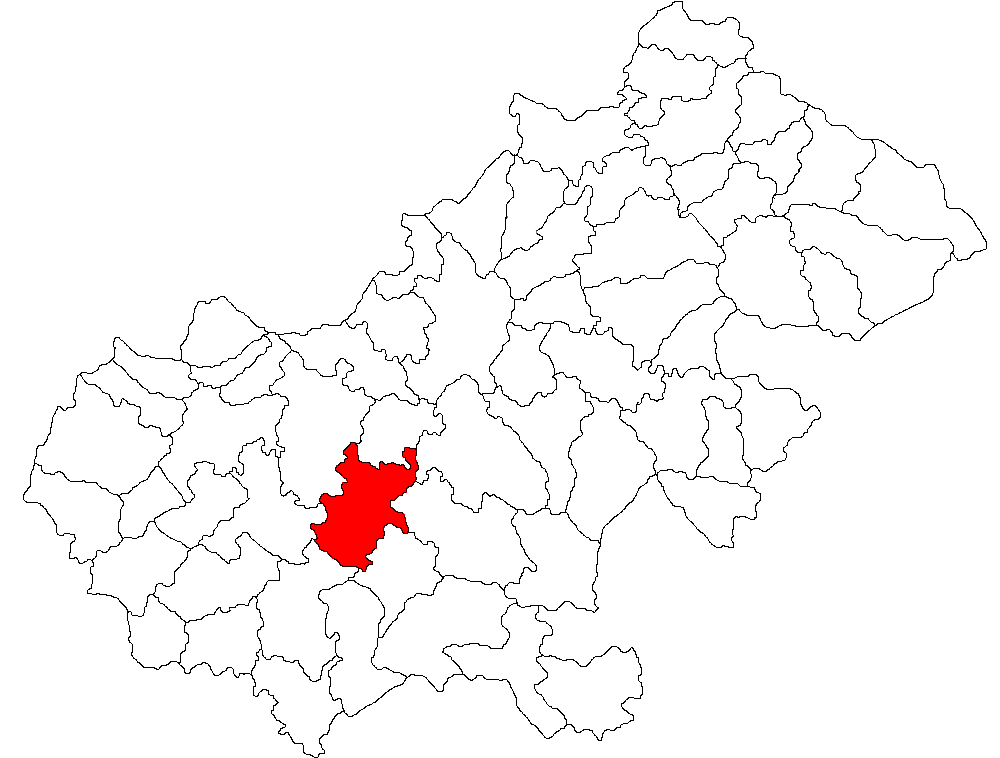
- Location in Satu Mare County

- Location in Romania
- Coordinates: 47°37′N 22°42′E
- Country: Romania
- County: Satu Mare

Government
  - Mayor (2020–2024): Daniel-Béla Balogh (PSD)
- Area: 93.52 km^{2} (36.11 sq mi)
- Elevation: 123 m (404 ft)
- Population (2021-12-01): 2,130
  - Density: 22.8/km^{2} (59.0/sq mi)
- Time zone: UTC+02:00 (EET)
  - Summer (DST): UTC+03:00 (EEST)
- Postal code: 447105
- Area code: (+40) 02 61
- Vehicle reg.: SM
- Website: primaria-craidorolt.ro

Craidorolț (Hungarian: Királydaróc, Hungarian pronunciation: [ˈkiraːjdɒroːts]) is a commune of 2,130 inhabitants as of 2021, situated in Satu Mare County, Romania. It is composed of five villages: Craidorolț, Crișeni (Kőröstelep), Eriu-Sâncrai (Érszentkirály), Satu Mic (Érkisfalu), and Țeghea (Krasznacégény).

== Demographics ==
Historical population
Year	Pop.	±%
2002	2,188	—
2011	2,215	+1.2%
2021	2,130	−3.8%
Source: Census data

At the 2011 census, the commune had 2,215 inhabitants; of those, 53% were Romanians, 24 Hungarians, 15% Roma, and 3% Ukrainians. Moreover, 55% had Romanian as first language, 37% Hungarian, and 3% Ukrainian.. At the 2021 census, Craidorolț had a population of 2,130, of which 52.72% were Romanians, 19.53% Hungarians, 19.15% Roma, and 3.05% Ukrainians.

== Natives ==
- Mircea Bolba (1961–2021), football player and manager
- Iuliu Coroianu (1847–1927), lawyer and activist
