= Andrid =

Andrid Érendréd
- Commune
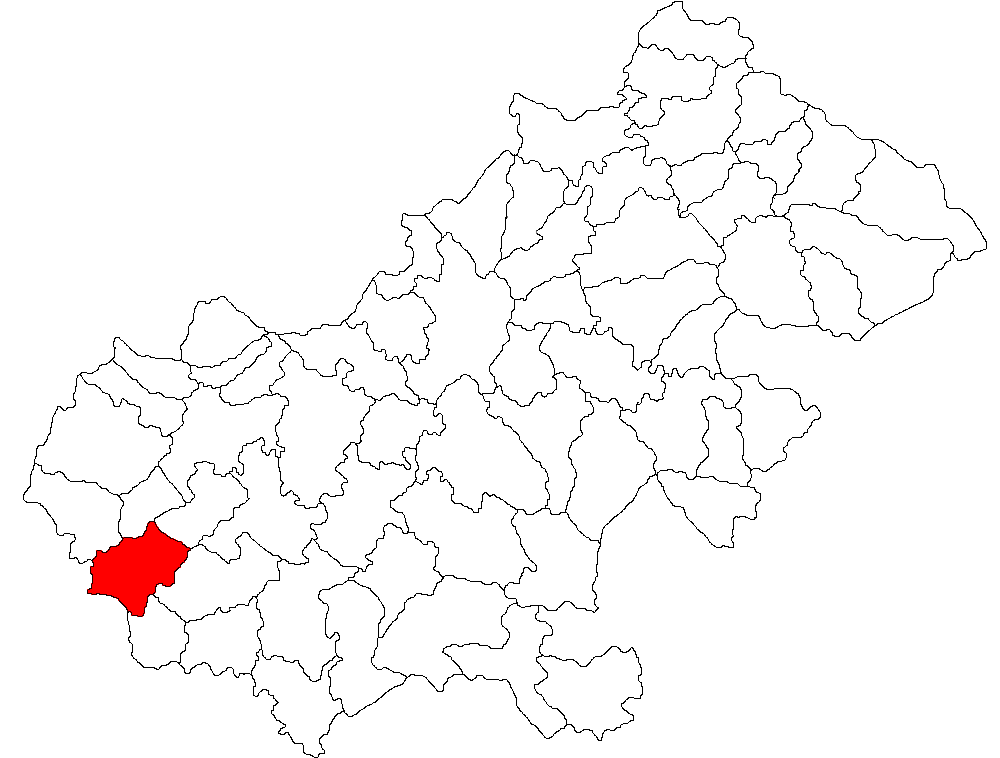
- Location in Satu Mare County

- Location in Romania
- Coordinates: 47°31′N 22°21′E
- Country: Romania
- County: Satu Mare
- Area: 62.31 km^{2} (24.06 sq mi)
- Population (2021-12-01): 2,455
  - Density: 39/km^{2} (100/sq mi)
- Time zone: EET/EEST (UTC+2/+3)
- Vehicle reg.: SM

Andrid (Hungarian: Érendréd, Hungarian pronunciation: [ˈeːrɛndreːd]) is a commune situated in Satu Mare County, Romania. It is composed of three villages: Andrid, Dindești (Érdengeleg) and Irina (Iriny).
