= Pir, Satu Mare =

Pir Szilágypér
- Commune
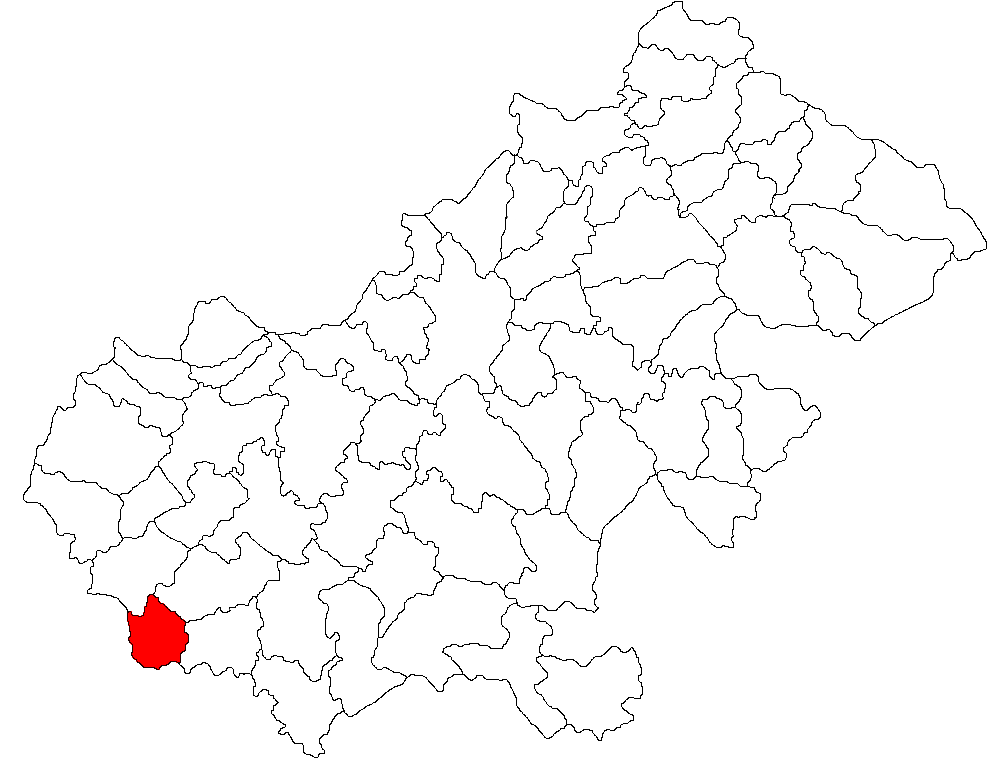
- Location in Satu Mare County

- Location in Romania
- Coordinates: 47°28′N 22°22′E
- Country: Romania
- County: Satu Mare

Government
  - Mayor (2020–2024): Ioan Florin Burlacu (PSD)
- Area: 41.09 km^{2} (15.86 sq mi)
- Elevation: 123 m (404 ft)
- Population (2021-12-01): 1,413
  - Density: 34/km^{2} (89/sq mi)
- Time zone: EET/EEST (UTC+2/+3)
- Postal code: 447245
- Area code: +(40) 261
- Vehicle reg.: SM
- Website: primariapir.ro

Pir (Hungarian: Szilágypér, Hungarian pronunciation: [ˈsilaːɟpeːr]) is a commune situated in Satu Mare County, Crișana, Romania. It is composed of three villages: Pir, Piru Nou (Kispér), and Sărvăzel (Peleszarvad).

== Demographics ==
At the 2002 census, the commune had a population of 1,769; of those, 54.77% were Hungarians, 36.4% Romanians, and 8.81% Roma. According to mother tongue, 60.71% of the population spoke Hungarian, while 39.11% spoke Romanian as their first language. At the 2011 census, there were 1,614 inhabitants, including 53.35% Hungarians, 36.49% Romanians, and 9.23% Roma. At the 2021 census, Pir had a population of 1,614, of which 62.28% were Hungarians, 31.49% Romanians, and 2.55% Roma.
