= Santău =

Santău Tasnádszántó
- Commune
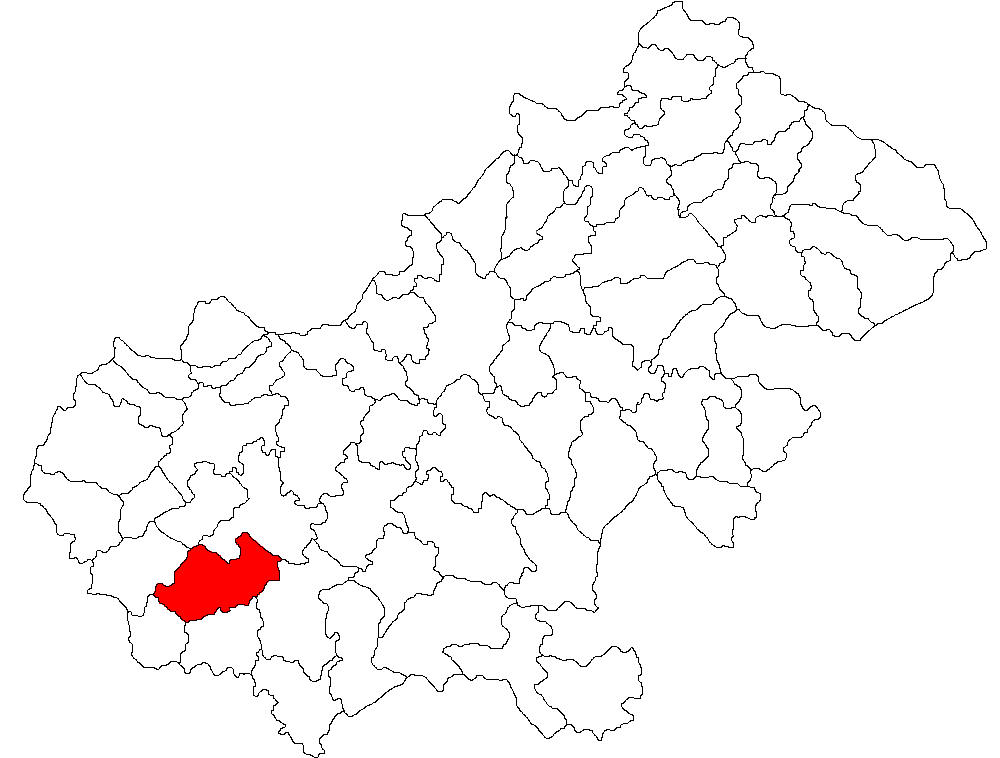
- Location in Satu Mare County

- Location in Romania
- Coordinates: 47°31′N 22°31′E
- Country: Romania
- County: Satu Mare

Government
  - Mayor (2020–2024): Sergiu Silaghi (PNL)
- Area: 82.95 km^{2} (32.03 sq mi)
- Population (2021-12-01): 2,200
  - Density: 27/km^{2} (69/sq mi)
- Time zone: EET/EEST (UTC+2/+3)
- Vehicle reg.: SM
- Website: primariasantau.ro

Santău (Hungarian: Tasnádszántó [ˈtɒʃnaːtsaːntoː]) is a commune in Satu Mare County, north-western Romania. It is composed of three villages: Chereușa (Érkőrös), Santău and Sudurău (Érszodoró).

The earliest document to mention Santău dates to 1213, and is found in the register of the Roman Catholic Diocese of Oradea Mare. Leontin Sălăjan was born there in 1913.

== Demographics ==
Ethnic groups (2011 census):

- Romanians: 1,250 (52.59%)
- Hungarians: 790 (33.24%)
- Roma: 298 (12.54%)

According to mother tongue, 1,284 (54.02%) speak Romanian as their first language, while 1,051 (44.22%) of the population speak Hungarian.
