= Căuaș =

Căuaș Érkávás
- Commune
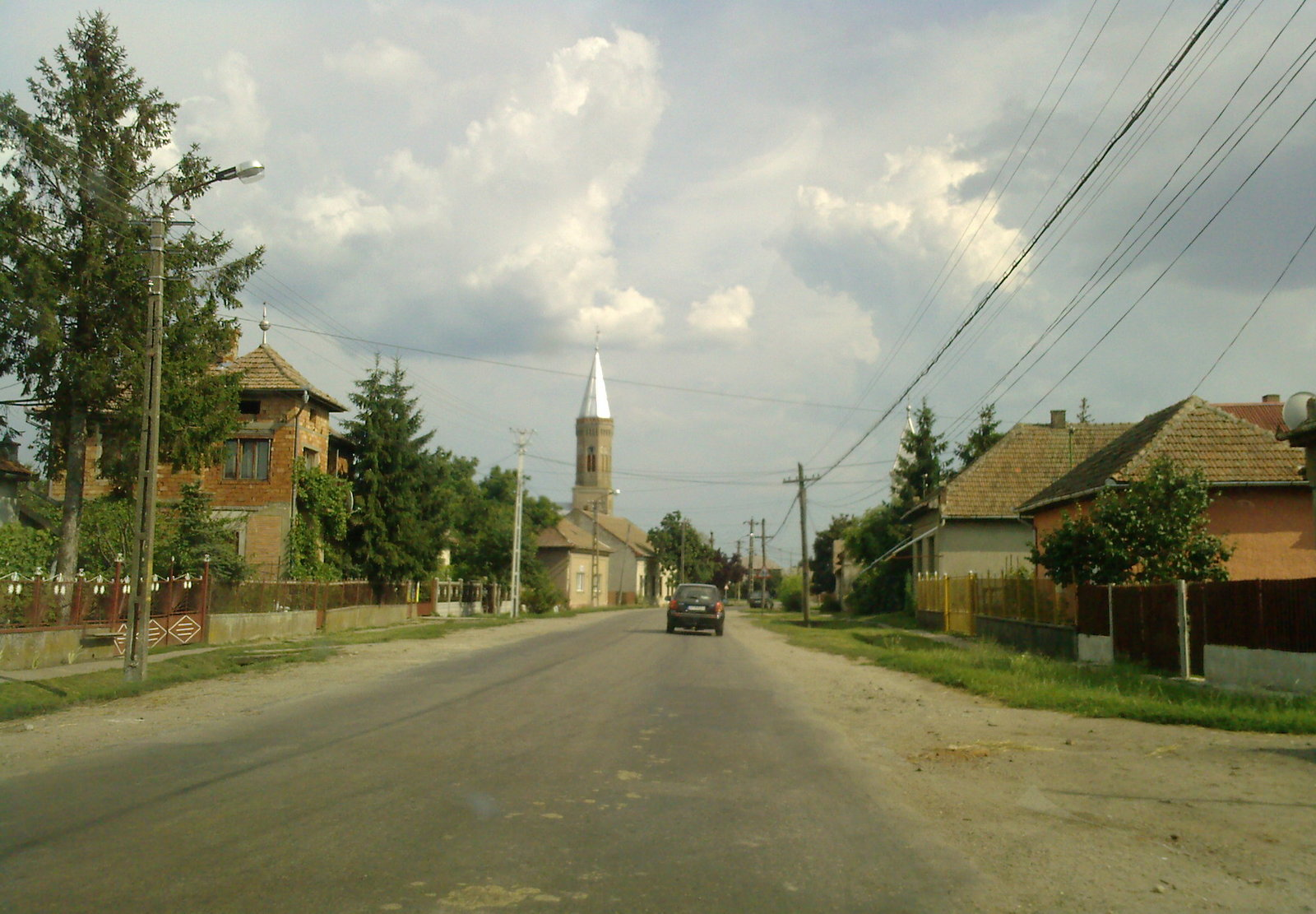
- Ghenci village

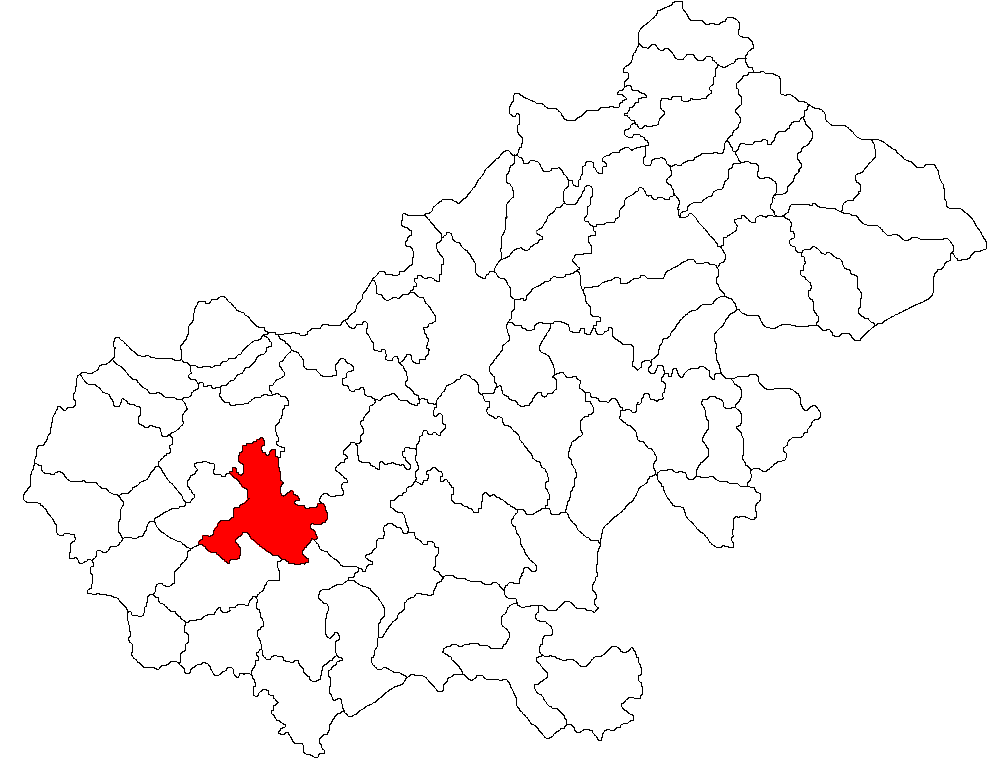
- Location in Satu Mare County

- Location in Romania
- Coordinates: 47°34′N 22°33′E
- Country: Romania
- County: Satu Mare

Government
  - Mayor (2024–2028): Barna Nagy (UDMR)
- Area: 94.27 km^{2} (36.40 sq mi)
- Elevation: 116 m (381 ft)
- Population (2021-12-01): 2,259
  - Density: 23.96/km^{2} (62.06/sq mi)
- Time zone: UTC+02:00 (EET)
  - Summer (DST): UTC+03:00 (EEST)
- Postal code: 447085
- Area code: +(40) 261
- Vehicle reg.: SM
- Website: comunacauas.ro

Căuaș (Hungarian: Érkávás, Hungarian pronunciation: [ˈeːrkaːvaːʃ]) is a commune of 2,259 inhabitants situated in Satu Mare County, Crișana, Romania. It is composed of six villages: Ady Endre (Érmindszent or Adyfalva), Căuaș, Ghenci (Gencs), Ghilești (Illéd), Hotoan (Érhatvan), and Rădulești (Újtanya).

== Demographics ==
Historical population
Year	Pop.	±%
1880	3,204	—
1890	3,809	+18.9%
1900	4,031	+5.8%
1910	4,008	−0.6%
1920	3,718	−7.2%
1930	3,646	−1.9%
1941	4,225	+15.9%
1956	4,419	+4.6%
1966	4,124	−6.7%
1977	3,640	−11.7%
1992	2,768	−24.0%
2002	2,539	−8.3%
2011	2,388	−5.9%
2021	2,259	−5.4%
Source: INS, Census data

At the 2011 census, the commune had a population of 2,388, of which 46.7% were Romanians, 35.1% Hungarians, and 17.9% Roma. At the 2021 census, there were 2,259 inhabitants, of which 42.54% were Romanians, 26.25% Hungarians, and 21.91% Roma.

== History ==
In July 2011, a Thracian settlement dating to 1050–1750 BC was discovered in Căuaș by a joint research group formed by Romanian and German archaeologists.

=== Ady Endre Memorial House ===
Three kilometres from Căuaș there is a small village with the name of the poet Endre Ady, one of the most important Hungarian poets. In 1957, the Ady Endre Memorial House was founded and in the same year the name of the small village Mecențiu was changed to Ady Endre. Among the important documents, books, and manuscripts, there is also the parish transcript of the Protestant Church with the registered birth date of the poet in it. In the opposite part of the courtyard there is the Ady Endre family peasant house, where the original furniture items are displayed.

== Notes ==
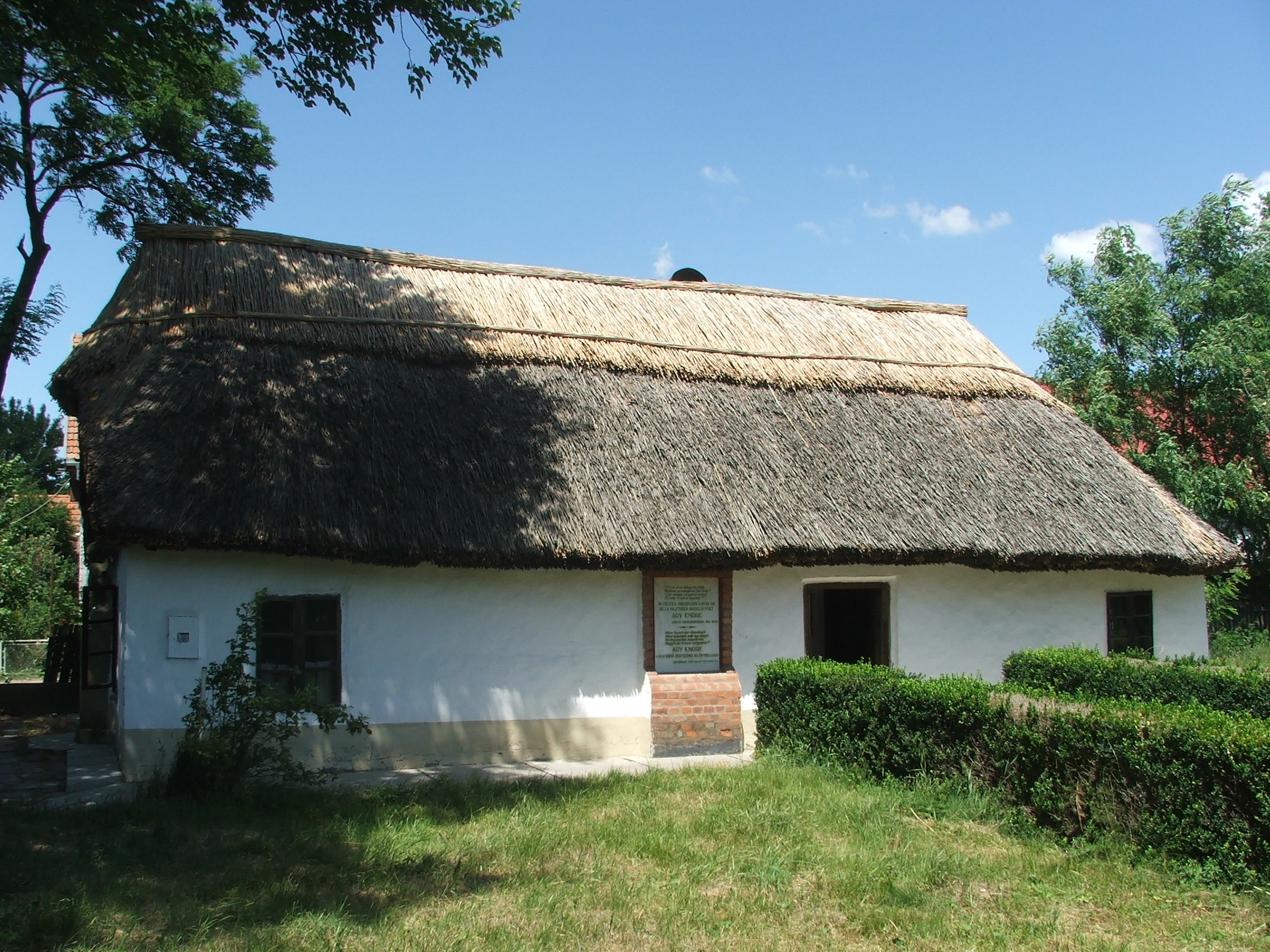
The house where Endre Ady was born
