= Erdélyi =

Erdélyi is a Hungarian word meaning 'related to Transylvania', which is called "Erdély" in Hungarian. People with the surname include:

- Anthony Erdélyi de Somkerék (died 1429 or 1430), Hungarian nobleman and courtier of King Sigismund of Luxembourg
- Arthur Erdélyi (1908–1977), Hungarian-born British mathematician
  - Erdelyi–Kober operator
- Balázs Erdélyi (born 1990), Hungarian water polo player
- Éva Erdélyi (1943–1978), Hungarian swimmer
- Francis de Erdely (Ferenc Erdélyi, 1904–1959), Hungarian-American artist
- György Erdélyi (1923–unknown), Hungarian swimmer
- Ildikó Erdélyi (born 1955), Hungarian long jumper
- István Erdélyi (born 1902), Hungarian film producer
- János Erdélyi (1814–1868), Hungarian poet, critic, author, philosopher and ethnographist
- László Erdélyi (born 1993), Hungarian footballer
- Mici Erdélyi (Mária Ernesztina Erdélyi, 1910–1994), Hungarian actress
- Mihály Erdélyi (1895–1979), Hungarian composer, lyricist, actor, and producer
- Miklós Erdélyi (1928–1993), Hungarian conductor
- Miklós Erdélyi (footballer) (born 1981), Hungarian footballer
- Nicholas Erdélyi (died c. 1476), Hungarian nobleman and vice-voivode of Transylvania
- Stefan Erdélyi (1905–1968), Hungarian-Romanian chess master
- Stephen Erdélyi (died 1482), Hungarian nobleman and vice-voivode of Transylvania
- Tamás Erdélyi (mathematician) (born 1961), Hungarian-born mathematician
- Tommy Ramone (or Thomas Erdelyi, born Erdélyi Tamás, 1949–2014), American musician
- Zsófia Erdélyi (born 1987), Hungarian long-distance runner

== See also ==
- Erdely (disambiguation)
- Vasile Erdeli (1794–1862), Romanian bishop
- Erdei
- Erdély
