= Anthony Erdélyi =

Hungarian nobleman

Anthony (I) Erdélyi
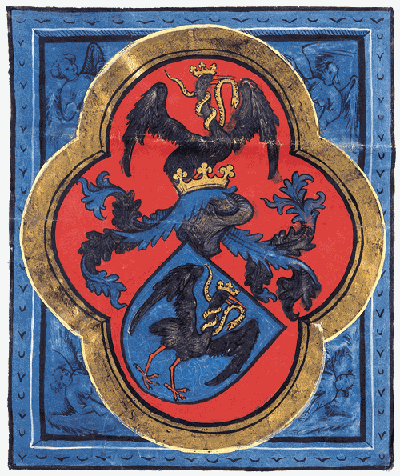
- Coat of arms of Anthony Erdélyi, donated by Sigismund in 1415, during the Council of Constance

Vice-ispán of Sáros
- Reign: 1406–1408
- Predecessor: John Pányi
- Successor: Nicholas Kellőc
- Born: early 1370s
- Died: 1429 or 1430
- Noble family: House of Erdélyi
- Spouses: 1, Margaret Antimus; 2, Clara N
- Issue: (1) Gelét (1) John I (1) Nicholas I (1) Barbara (1) Catherine (2) Ladislaus I (2) Stephen I
- Father: Nicholas Somkeréki
- Mother: Elizabeth Méhesi

Anthony (I) Erdélyi de Somkerék (Hungarian: somkeréki Erdélyi (I.) Antal; died 1429 or 1430) was a Hungarian nobleman and loyal courtier of King Sigismund of Luxembourg. He was familiaris of Nicholas Garai, Palatine of Hungary. Initially known as Anthony of Somkerék (Hungarian: Somkeréki Antal), he was the founder of the distinguished Erdélyi de Somkerék noble family.

== Family ==
Anthony was born in the early 1370s into the Somkeréki family, which had landholdings and estates in Transylvania. The kinship originated from the gens (clan) Becsegergely, thus his distant relatives were the Bethlen and Apafi families, future royal houses of the Principality of Transylvania. His earliest known ancestor is comes Ant in the late 12th century. Anthony was one of the three children of Nicholas Somkeréki (fl. 1360–92), a member of the Nemegye branch of the kindred, and Elizabeth Méhesi. Anthony's siblings were John (fl. 1391–1410), whose two sons died without male descendants, and Catherine (fl. 1408–10), who married vice-voivode Peter Sztrigyi. When Anthony resided abroad for years to service his king, or held positions outside the region of Transylvania, he was considered as a foreigner and as a result he was called Erdélyi ("from Transylvania"), as referring to his place of origin. After his death, it became surname of the family.

His first wife was Margaret Antimus, a daughter of vice-palatine John Antimus, who also served the Garai family. She was mentioned by a single charter dated around 1402 or 1403, and died before 1415. Their marriage produced three sons and two daughters. The eldest child Gelét (or Gregory) was referred to as a royal familiaris in 1430. John I did not survive childhood, while Nicholas I simultaneously functioned as vice-voivode and ispán of Torda County in 1448. The two daughters Barbara and Catherine married Stephen Tuzsoni ("the Bulgarian") and vice-voivode Nicholas Vízaknai, respectively. After Margaret's death, Anthony married his second spouse Clara from an unidentified family. She was mentioned by a papal document in 1415. They had two sons: Ladislaus I, who died in infancy, and Stephen I, probably the most illustrious member of the family. The 16th-century members of the Erdélyi family descended from Stephen's branch.

== Career ==
Erdélyi is first mentioned by name in December 1391 during a land division agreement within the family. He appeared in a same context in the next year. It is possible that his father died in that year, becoming Anthony and his brother John Somkeréki as joint heads of the household in Somkerék (today Șintereag, Romania). He entered royal service by 1396, when participated in the Battle of Nicopolis. After the defeat, Erdélyi and other lords kept the ships ready, when Sigismund and his escort fled the battlefield and managed to escape with Venetian ships in the Danube. According to historian Elemér Mályusz, Erdélyi then already belonged to Nicholas Garai's accompaniment (considering that, Garai and his banderium was entrusted to secure Sigismund's withdrawal in the 1395 Wallachian campaign too). Erdélyi was made castellan of Knin Fortress by 1401 (when his lord Garai held the dignity of Ban of Croatia and his father-in-law John Antimus functioned as vice-ban). In that capacity, he successfully defended the castle against Hrvoje Vukčić Hrvatinić, the partisan of claimant Ladislaus of Naples, who besieged Knin in that year. When Garai was appointed Palatine of Hungary, Erdélyi also left Croatia.

For his courageous engagement in Knin, while Sigismund was imprisoned, Erdélyi was granted the villages of Harina, Bilak (Herina and Domnești in Romania, respectively) and the uninhabited Nécs in July 1402. In that year, he participated in Sigismund's military expedition to the Kingdom of Bohemia, when the king captured his brother Wenceslaus IV and ruled Bohemia for nineteen months. Erdélyi stayed in Bohemia until the next year, when Sigismund had to abadon his claim temporarily due to Ladislaus of Naples' invasion to Southern Hungary. Returning Hungary, Erdélyi was donated the confiscated lands, fields, meadows and mill of the disloyal John Kolman for his Bohemian military service in May 1403. He received huge land donations in June 1405: Gernyeszeg, Sáromberke, Sárpatak, Unoka and Körtekapu (today Gornești, Dumbrăvioara, Șapartoc, Onuca and Poarta, respectively) became properties of the Erdélyi family. His territorial seat was Sáromberke, which also granted the right to collect custom and to host market.

Erdélyi was frequently mentioned as castellan of Somló between 1405 and 1411. He also acted as relator of Garai during a lawsuit in 1406. When his lord served as ispán of Sáros County from 1406 to 1409, Erdélyi functioned as one of the two vice-ispáns under him, alongside Demetrius Zsörki. Erdélyi was last mentioned in this capacity in August 1408, but it is plausible that he held the office until Garai's end of term in 1409. Alongside Stibor of Stiboricz, Voivode of Transylvania and other local nobles, Erdélyi participated in a provincial diet at Brassó (present-day Brașov, Romania) on 1 September 1412, where acted as an arbiter in the revision of previously issued privilege diplomas of the local Saxon district ("Terra Saxonum de Barasu"). As a member of the escort of Nicholas Garai, Erdélyi traveled to Germany and was present at the coronation of Sigismund as King of the Romans took place in Aachen on 8 November 1414. Traveling further to Italy, Erdélyi also took part in the initial phase of the Council of Constance at the turn of 1414 and 1415, and acted as majordomo of Garai's court. Returning Hungary, Erdélyi served as castellan of Buda and Rohonc (present-day Rechnitz in Austria) in 1416. Two documents issued in July 1423 refer to him as vice-palatine. Erdélyi died in 1429 or 1430; he last appears as living person in contemporary records in May 1429 and was first referred to as deceased in March 1430.

== Estates and privileges ==
For his loyal service, he was granted the privilege of building a castle in one of his estates by Sigismund at the national diet of Tétény (today Budafok-Tétény) in August 1410. The monarch confirmed this permission in April 1415. This was implemented by his son Stephen decades later, who erected a castle near Gernyeszeg. In June 1412, King Sigismund also permitted to Erdélyi to hold a national fair twice a year and weekly fair on Mondays at Somkerék. Erdélyi also acquired this privilege regarding his estate at Sáromberke in March 1415. Two months later, a royal charter ordered payment of the customs there for the local Székely and Saxon communities. For his service in Germany, Erdélyi and his family were granted the right of jus gladii to all of his landholdings in November 1414. After his role in the Council of Constance, the royal chancellery also donated a coat-of-arms to the Erdélyi family in January 1415. A month later, Antipope John XXIII permitted Anthony Erdélyi and his wife, Clara to receive full forgiveness from all confessors on the territory of the Diocese of Transylvania.

Erdélyi bought a portion of Szengyel (present-day Sânger, Romania) from local nobles in 1414. He also purchased the village of Záh in 1417, too. He bought the two-thirds portion of Denk in Hunyad County (today Dâncu Mare and Dâncu Mic in Romania) from his nephews, the sons of Peter Sztrigyi in 1421, who were willing to divest the estate because of their uncle's previous benefits. Erdélyi bought half of plow and fishpond at Faragó (today Fărăgău, Romania) from the widow of John Sámsondi in May 1427. Erdélyi acquired the half of the uninhabited waste Lőrinctelke in Torda County for 100 denari from John Kecseti in May 1428. Erdélyi exchanged his estates Méhes and Valka (present-day Miheșu de Câmpie and Văleni in Romania, respectively) for the village Rücs (present-day Râciu in Romania) with James Meggyesfalvi in April 1429. The cathedral chapter of Transylvania, as a place of authentication, registered Erdélyi as the new owner of Rücs in May 1429, his last mention as a living person.

Since the 1400s, various lawsuits were launched against Erdélyi and his soldiers for their alleged involvements in unlawful acquisitions of neighboring lands, looting and domination. In one case, Erdélyi was charged with murder of a local nobleman Andrew Csatári, but he was acquitted. He also had several conflicts with Ladislaus II Szécsényi, the owner of Sárpatak (today Șapartoc, Romania) in Torda County. For instance, Szécsényi intended to build a mill at river Mureș (Maros), whose operation threatened Erdélyi's neighboring lands, Gernyeszeg and Sáromberke with flooding. Despite an official ban, the mill was built within short time, causing heavy damage to Erdélyi. Thereafter, Szécsényi was forced to demolish the mill. Regarding the verdicts of the lawsuits against him, Erdélyi's affiliation to the Garais and, thus, the royal court protected him from adverse judgments, according to historian Szidónia Weisz. Erdélyi, as a lesser nobleman, was much richer than most of his neighbors because of his influential relationships, thus he was able to lend large sums for pledged landholdings, further increasing his family's estates and wealth.

== Sources ==
- Engel, Pál (1996). Magyarország világi archontológiája, 1301–1457, I. [Secular Archontology of Hungary, 1301–1457, Volume I] (in Hungarian). História, MTA Történettudományi Intézete. ISBN 963-8312-44-0.
- Mályusz, Elemér (1984). Zsigmond király uralma Magyarországon, 1387–1437 [The Rule of King Sigismund in Hungary, 1387–1437] (in Hungarian). Gondolat. ISBN 963-281-414-2.
- Weisz, Szidónia (2012a). "Egy erdélyi nemes Luxemburgi Zsigmond szolgálatában. Somkeréki Erdélyi Antal élettörténete [A Transylvanian Noble in the Service of Sigismund of Luxembourg. The Life of Anthony Erdélyi de Somkerék]". In Pál-Antal, Sándor; Simon, Zsolt (eds.). A Maros megyei magyarság történtéből. III. kötet (in Hungarian). Mentor Kiadó. pp. 261–273. ISBN 978-973-599-570-6.
- Weisz, Szidónia (2012b). "Erdélyi Miklós és István (Két alvajda életpályája a késő középkorból) [Nicholas and Stephen Erdélyi: The Careers of Two Vice-Voivodes From the Late Middle Ages]". In Pál-Antal, Sándor; Sigmirean, Cornel; Simon, Zsolt (eds.). A történetíró elhivatottsága – Vocaţia istoricului. Emlékkönyv Szabó Miklós születésének 80. évfordulójára (in Hungarian). Mentor Kiadó. pp. 416–433. ISBN 978-973-599-571-3.
