= Stephen Erdélyi =

Stephen (I) Erdélyi

Vice-voivode of Transylvania
- Reign: 1462–1465; 1476
- Predecessor: Benedict Gibárt & George Szentiványi (1st term); Dominic Bethlen (2nd term)
- Successor: Ladislaus Nádasdi (1st term); Dominic Bethlen (2nd term)
- Born: 1418/1422
- Died: 1482
- Noble family: House of Erdélyi
- Spouse: Anne Majos de Dáró
- Issue: Thomas; John II; Martin; Judith; Anne; Potentiana; Clara; Magdalene
- Father: Anthony Erdélyi
- Mother: Clara N

Stephen (I) Erdélyi de Somkerék (Hungarian: somkeréki Erdélyi (I.) István; died 1482) was a Hungarian nobleman, who served as Vice-voivode of Transylvania from 1462 to 1465, and for a short time in 1476. He participated in the Transylvanian rebellion against King Matthias Corvinus in 1467.

== Family ==
He was born into the Erdélyi family as the youngest son of Anthony Erdélyi, who was a prominent familiaris of Palatine Nicholas Garai. Stephen's mother was a certain noblewoman Clara, the second wife of his father. He had four brothers and two sisters, out of which two (Gelét and John I) presumably predeceased their father without descendants. His eldest half-brother Nicholas I was also a vice-voivode in 1448, in addition to his position of ispán of Torda County.

His marriage to Anne Majos de Dáró produced eight children; the most notable was John II, who married to Justina Szilágyi, the widow of Vlad the Impaler and cousin of King Matthias. Through his two sons Thomas and Martin, the Erdélyi family flourished until 1643 and closely connected to the Transylvanian nobility as a consequence of several marriage alliances.

== Career ==
Stephen was born around between 1418 and 1422. He is listed among Anthony's sons for the first time in May 1422 by a charter related to a territorial debate with their neighbours. In a similar document issued in October 1418, only his elder siblings appeared, which implies that Stephen was born after that. His next appearance occurred in January 1423, another charter related to a possession lawsuit. As historian Szidónia Weisz argues, Stephen was child at that time, as the contemporary sources do not mention his name for the next almost twenty years. In 1441, Nicholas and Stephen donated Nagydenk, Kisdenk and Mártondenk/Martinesd in Hunyad County (today all belong to Mărtinești commune in Romania) to their familiaris Mark Konya and his daughter Elizabeth for their service. Nicholas and Stephen jointly inherited the family landholdings after the death of the father in 1429 or 1430. According to a charter issued on 22 March 1446 at Somkerék (today Șintereag, Romania), they shared the lands of Somkerék, Sáromberke and Gernyeszeg (today Dumbrăvioara and Gornești in Romania, respectively) among themselves, while also owned jointly the villages of Sárpatak (Șapartoc), Unoka (Onuca), Körtekapu (Poarta), Szekérberete, Rücs (Râciu), Záh and Lőrinctelke (Leorinţa), in addition to parts of Nagydenk, Kisdenk and Mártondenk/Martinesd (which were regained by then). They handed over the latter settlements to King Matthias in return for Péterlaka (Petrilaca de Mureș) and Körtvényfája (Periș) in 1458, today parts of Gornești commune.

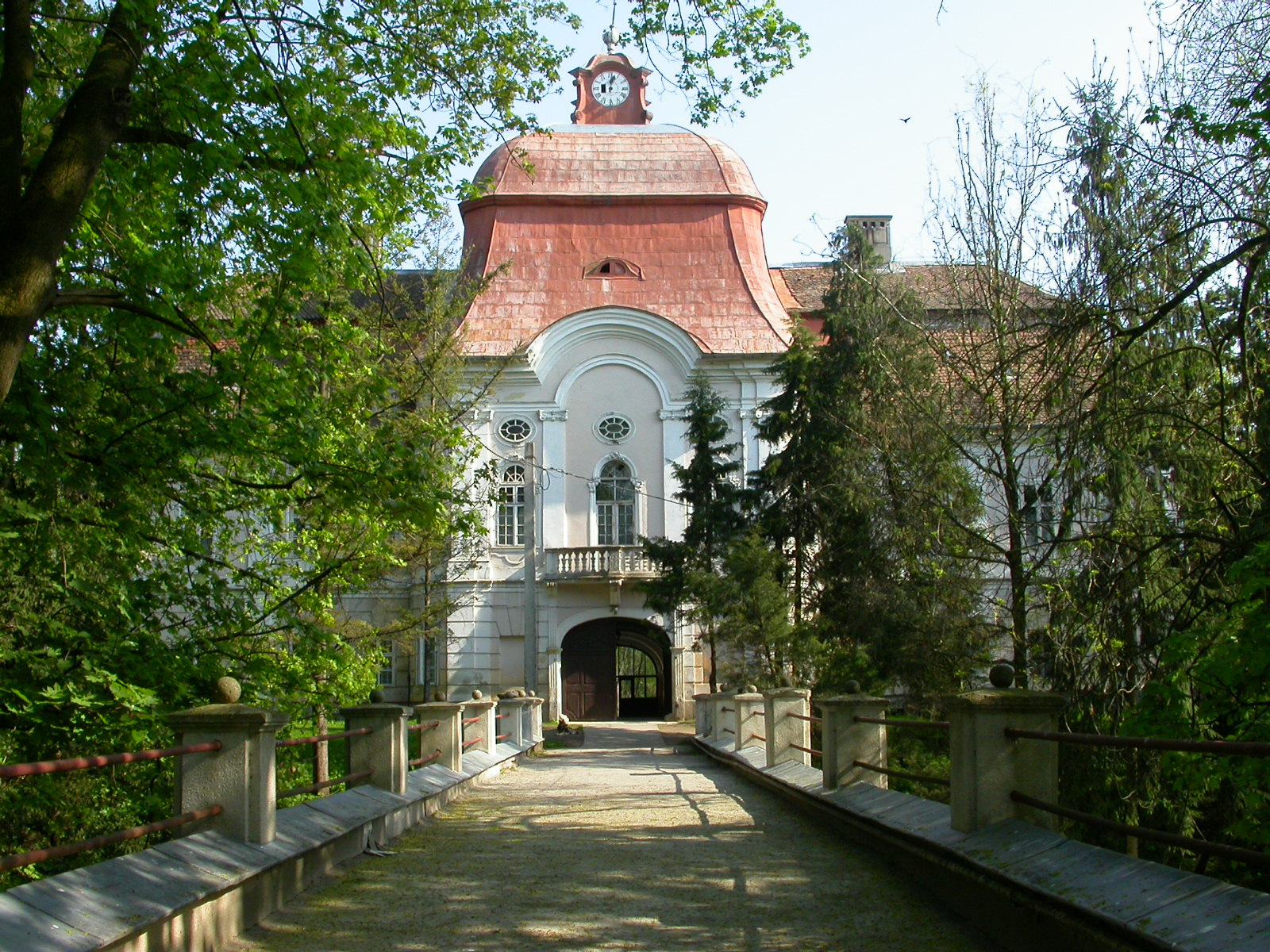
Gornești (Gernyeszeg) Castle in present-day Romania, erected by Stephen Erdélyi in the mid-15th century. The castle was heavily rebuilt into a manor house by Mihály Teleki in the 17th century

As a familiaris of Regent John Hunyadi, he served as vice-ispán of Bodrog County in 1453, his only position outside the region of Transylvania during his career, which he held during the ispánate of Nicholas Újlaki, alongside Ladislaus Nagyvölgyi and Ladislaus Geszti. By March 1456, Erdélyi was promoted to the dignity of ispán of Máramaros County, which meant he became also ex officio castellan of Huszt (present-day Khust, Ukraine) and ispán of the salt chamber of Máramaros, as allowances to the office. Erdélyi was mentioned as a royal castellan of Diód (today Stremț in Romania) alongside James Lengyel in 1459. Under the voivodeship of John Pongrác de Dengeleg, he served as vice-voivode for the first time from 1462 to 1465. He held the office along with his brother-in-law Nicholas Vízaknai. Erdélyi was also appointed co-castellan of Görgény Castle (today Gurghiu in Romania) on behalf of his lord, who also acted as Count of the Székelys. For his service, Erdélyi was granted the collection right of tax paid by the Romanians in his estate, as well as the "sheep fiftieth" (Latin: quinquagesima ovium) by Matthias in November 1462. Since the early 1460s, he had several lawsuits against other noblemen, and was frequently accused with abuse of office, while held the title of vice-voivode. One of his most staunch opponent was Benedict Veres de Farnas, with whom they have mutually plundered their holdings over the years. After their reconciliation in June 1463, Veres married Erdélyi's niece Helen. Their joint troops plundered and robbed the region of Kolozs County, devastating and looting churches, causing a damage of 1500 florins for the inhabitants and the Transylvanian Chapter. As Erdélyi was not present at the trial, Bishop Nicholas Zápolya excommunicated him, but Matthias absolved the verdict a year later.

His territorial centre laid in Gernyeszeg, of which he was sole owner since the heritage-sharing agreement with Nicholas. There he built a Gothic-Renaissance church in the 1450s. The family's carved coat-of-arms above the entrance confirmed his contribution. During the tenure of his first vice-voivodeship, he also erected a fortified castle. His father Anthony received the privilege of building a castle in 1410 by King Sigismund of Luxembourg, which was implemented by Erdélyi. The fortress is mentioned for the first time in 1477. Near Görgény and Marosvécs (today Brâncovenești, Romania), the castle had a strategic role, the three forts formed a coherent defence-system at the river Maros (Mureș). Despite these construction projects, it appears based on documents that Erdélyi was facing an economic decline since the early 1460s. He pledged his several landholdings in the upcoming years, for instance Vingárd (1466) and Bencenc (1469).

== Rebellion and aftermath ==
In 1467, Erdélyi joined the group of Transylvanian noblemen revolting against Matthias. As a consequence of his high treason, his 18 villages in Inner Szolnok and Torda Counties were confiscated by the royal authority on 2 October 1468 and donated them to Stephen's nephew Ladislaus. However Erdélyi regained most of his estates two months later in December 1468, after he was granted royal amnesty. Erdélyi also lost his seat Gernyeszeg Castle after the rebellion. At first, the fort was seized by the newly appointed voivode Nicholas Csupor, then it had been already donated to Ladislaus Pongrác by the time of Erdélyi's amnesty. Pongrác was the first spouse of Erdélyi's future daughter-in-law, Justina Szilágyi, who inherited the castle after her husband's death 1474. Stephen Erdélyi and his family laid claim to Justina's castle at Gernyeszeg and the nearby villages in 1478. To secure her position, she married Paul Suki, a nephew of a one-time co-owner of the estate. However Suki soon died in 1479. About two years later, Justina married Stephen's son John, thus Erdélyi was able to regain his castle after a decade.

Erdélyi briefly functioned as vice-voivode for the second time in 1476, serving along with Dominic Bethlen under the third voivodeship of John Pongrác. Erdélyi also used the title of captain simultaneously with his office. In the name of his voivode, Erdélyi called the local Transylvanian nobles for a war against the Ottoman Empire to participate in Stephen Báthory's campaign to Wallachia, assisting the claims of Vlad the Impaler. Through the 1470s, Stephen was involved in a lawsuit against his brother Nicholas over a mill and its customs in Somkerék, which were unlawfully usurped by Nicholas, in accordance with Stephen's narration. In contrast, Nicholas argued he built the mill at its own expense in the joint estate. Stephen demanded half of the share and was even willing to pay half the cost of construction, but Nicholas refused it. When Stephen was elected vice-voivode, using his increased influence, he turned to the Kolozsmonostor Abbey to investigate the case. After their verdict was delivered in favour of Stephen, Voivode John Pongrác called Nicholas to return the Stephen's inherited part of the mill to his brother immediately. Stephen Erdélyi died in 1482.

== Sources ==
- C. Tóth, Norbert; Horváth, Richárd; Neumann, Tibor; Pálosfalvi, Tamás (2016). Magyarország világi archontológiája, 1458–1526, I. Főpapok és bárók [Secular Archontology of Hungary, 1458–1526, Volume I: Prelates and Barons] (in Hungarian). MTA Bölcsészettudományi Kutatóközpont Történettudományi Intézete. ISBN 978-963-4160-35-9.
- Engel, Pál (1996). Magyarország világi archontológiája, 1301–1457, I. [Secular Archontology of Hungary, 1301–1457, Volume I] (in Hungarian). História, MTA Történettudományi Intézete. ISBN 963-8312-44-0.
- W. Kovács, András (2012). "Remarks on the Careers of the Vice-voivodes of Transylvania in the Late Middle Ages (1458–1526)". Transylvanian Review. 21 (Suppl. no. 2). Romanian Cultural Foundation: 103–138.
- Weisz, Szidónia (2009). "Serving Matthias or turning against him? The case of István Erdélyi, a nobleman from Transylvania". In Bárány, Attila; Györkös, Attila (eds.). Matthias and His Legacy. Cultural and Political Encounters Between East and West. University of Debrecen. pp. 453–462. ISBN 978-963-473-276-1.
- Weisz, Szidónia (2012). "Erdélyi Miklós és István (Két alvajda életpályája a késő középkorból) [Nicholas and Stephen Erdélyi: The Careers of Two Vice-Voivodes From the Late Middle Ages]". In Pál-Antal, Sándor; Sigmirean, Cornel; Simon, Zsolt (eds.). A történetíró elhivatottsága – Vocaţia istoricului. Emlékkönyv Szabó Miklós születésének 80. évfordulójára (in Hungarian). Mentor Kiadó. pp. 416–433. ISBN 978-973-599-571-3.

Stephen I House of Erdélyi Born: c. 1422 Died: 1482
Political offices
| Preceded by Benedict Gibárt & George Szentiványi | Vice-voivode of Transylvania alongside Nicholas Vízaknai; 1462–1465 | Succeeded by Ladislaus Nádasdi |
| Preceded by Dominic Bethlen | Vice-voivode of Transylvania alongside Dominic Bethlen; 1476 | Succeeded by Dominic Bethlen |
