= Nicholas Erdélyi =

Nicholas (I) Erdélyi

Vice-voivode of Transylvania
- Reign: 1448
- Predecessor: Stephen Jánosi
- Successor: Michael Dormánházi
- Died: between 1476 and 1481
- Noble family: House of Erdélyi
- Spouses: 1, Anne Apafi; 2, Barbara N
- Issue: (1) Ladislaus II (1) Catherine (1) Helen (1) Dorothy (1) Potentiana (2) Anne (2) Hedwig (2) Stephen II (2) Ursula
- Father: Anthony Erdélyi
- Mother: Margaret Antimus

Nicholas (I) Erdélyi de Somkerék (Hungarian: somkeréki Erdélyi (I.) Miklós; died between 1476 and 1481) was a Hungarian nobleman, who served as Vice-voivode of Transylvania in 1448.

== Family ==
He was born into the Erdélyi family as one of the five sons of Anthony Erdélyi and his first wife, Margaret Antimus de Tapsony. His father was a prominent familiaris of Palatine Nicholas Garai. After Margaret's death sometimes before 1415, Anthony married to a certain noblewoman Clara. One of Nicholas' half-siblings was Stephen I, also a vice-voivode during the reign of King Matthias Corvinus. His sister Catherine was the wife of Nicholas Vízaknai. Nicholas married at first to his distant relative Anne Apafi (first mentioned in 1448, but their marriage possibly took place around 1443 or 1444). After her death, he became the husband of Barbara from an unidentified family, who was mentioned as a widow in 1487. From his two marriages, Nicholas had nine children; his elder son Ladislaus II died without male heirs, while the younger one Stephen II did not survive the childhood.

== Career ==
Nicholas Erdélyi was first mentioned by an estate sales contract on 8 April 1416. Nicholas and Stephen jointly inherited the family landholdings after the death of their father in 1429 or 1430. According to a charter issued on 22 March 1446 at Somkerék (today Șintereag, Romania), they shared the lands of Somkerék, Sáromberke and Gernyeszeg (today Dumbrăvioara and Gornești in Romania, respectively) among themselves, while also owned jointly the villages of Sárpatak (Șapartoc), Unoka (Onuca), Körtekapu (Poarta), Szekérberete, Rücs (Râciu), Záh and Lőrinctelke (Leorinţa), in addition to parts of Nagydenk, Kisdenk and Mártondenk/Martinesd in Hunyad County (today all belong to Mărtinești commune in Romania). They handed over the latter settlements to King Matthias in return for Péterlaka (Petrilaca de Mureș) and Körtvényfája (Periș) in 1458, today parts of Gornești commune.

In 1448, Erdélyi simultaneously held the office of vice-voivode and ispán of Torda County for a short time, serving alongside other noblemen. Erdélyi possibly represented Regent John Hunyadi in this capacity. In October 1457, he was commissioned by Michael Szilágyi to occupy some lands of his brother-in-law, Nicholas Vízaknai, who became disgraced. It confirmed that the Erdélyi brothers remained loyal to the Hunyadi family during the emerging civil war, thus they received land donations after Matthias ascended the Hungarian throne in 1458. Both of them gained tax exemption of "sheep fiftieth" in 1462, while Nicholas and his adult son Ladislaus also received this privilege in the next year. Matthias transformed the right of customs collection from Sáromberke to Szekérberete in March 1467. Through the 1470s, Nicholas was involved in a lawsuit against his brother Stephen over a mill and its customs in Somkerék, which were unlawfully usurped by Nicholas, in accordance with Stephen's narration. Nicholas argued he built the mill at its own expense in the joint estate. Stephen demanded half of the share and was even willing to pay half the cost of construction, but Nicholas refused it. When Stephen was elected vice-voivode in 1476, using his increased influence, he turned to the Kolozsmonostor Abbey to investigate the case. After their verdict was delivered in favour of Stephen, Voivode John Pongrác called Nicholas to return the Stephen's inherited part of the mill to his brother immediately.

== Sources ==
- Engel, Pál (1996). Magyarország világi archontológiája, 1301–1457, I. [Secular Archontology of Hungary, 1301–1457, Volume I] (in Hungarian). História, MTA Történettudományi Intézete. ISBN 963-8312-44-0.
- Weisz, Szidónia (2012). "Erdélyi Miklós és István (Két alvajda életpályája a késő középkorból) [Nicholas and Stephen Erdélyi: The Careers of Two Vice-Voivodes From the Late Middle Ages]". In Pál-Antal, Sándor; Sigmirean, Cornel; Simon, Zsolt (eds.). A történetíró elhivatottsága – Vocaţia istoricului. Emlékkönyv Szabó Miklós születésének 80. évfordulójára (in Hungarian). Mentor Kiadó. pp. 416–433. ISBN 978-973-599-571-3.

Nicholas I House of Erdélyi Born: ? Died: after 1476
Political offices
Preceded by Stephen Jánosi	Vice-voivode of Transylvania; 1448	Succeeded by Michael Dormánházi
