= Erdeli =

Erdeli is a surname. Notable people with the surname include:

- Adalbert Erdeli (1891–1955), Hungarian and Carpatho-Rusyn painter and writer
- Ivan Erdeli (1870–1939), Russian military commander and General of Cavalry
- Vasile Erdeli (1794–1862), Hungarian-born Romanian bishop

== See also ==
- Erdély
- Erdélyi
