= CS Crișul Aleșd =

Romanian football club

Crișul Aleșd
- Full name: Club Sportiv Crișul Aleșd
- Nicknames: Flăcăii Aleșdului (The Young Men of Aleșd); Alb-albaștrii (The White and Blue); Aleșdanii (The People from Aleșd)
- Short name: Crișul
- Founded: 1921; 105 years ago as Stăruința Aleșd; 2002; 24 years ago as Crișul Aleșd
- Ground: Crișul
- Capacity: 800
- Owner: Town of Aleșd
- Manager: Ciprian Fogarași
- League: Liga IV
- 2025–26: Liga IV, Bihor County, 7th of 14
Home colours	Away colours

Club Sportiv Crișul Aleșd, commonly known as Crișul Aleșd, is a Romanian professional football club based in Aleșd, Romania, founded in 1921. Currently the team plays in Liga IV – Bihor County.

== History ==
Crișul Aleșd was established in 1921, under the name of Stăruința Aleșd, but mostly played at the level of regional and county leagues. The first important performance of the "white and blues" was during the 1973–74 Cupa României season, when they achieved Round of 32, where they were eliminated by Universitatea Cluj, top-flight team at that time, score 0–6.

Crișul won its first and last 4th tier title at the end of the 1996–97 season and qualified for the promotion play-offs, where they won 2–0 against AC Recaș, the Timiș County champions. Crișul survived for five consecutive seasons at the level of Divizia C, before it withdrew and enrolled back in the county leagues, due to financial reasons. During these seasons, Crișul achieved the following rankings: 7th (of 20), 7th (of 19), 9th (of 16), 8th (of 16), 10th (of 16).

In this period, Crișul equaled its best performance and achieved again the Round of 32 during the 1998–99 Cupa României season, where it was eliminated again, now with the score of 0–5 by Oțelul Galați, also a top-flight member at that time. Since 2002, Crișul played only in the county leagues with no notable results, but remained a constant presence at this level. On the other hand, "Flăcăii Aleșdului" achieved some important results at youth level, where they won the county league for two times and also achieved the quarter-finals of the national tournament, during the 2022–23 season.

== Ground ==
The club plays its home matches on Crișul Stadium from Aleșd, with a capacity of 800 seats on the two existing stands.

== Honours ==
=== Leagues ===
Liga IV – Bihor County

- Winners (1): 1996–97
- Runners-up (1): 2006–07

==== Cups ====
Cupa României

- Round of 32 (2): 1973–74, 1998–99

=== Other performances ===
- 5 seasons in Liga III

== Players ==
=== First team squad ===
As of 1 March 2025

Note: Flags indicate national team as defined under FIFA eligibility rules; some limited exceptions apply. Players may hold more than one non-FIFA nationality.

No.	Pos.	Nation	Player
1	GK	ROU	Elisei Pintea
2	DF	ROU	Adrian Chiș (Captain)
3	MF	ROU	Rareș Burlău
4	DF	ROU	Darius Broinaș
5	DF	ROU	Raul Pascar
6	MF	ROU	Cosmin Abrudan
7	FW	ROU	Gabriel Balogh
8	MF	ROU	Andrei Boier
9	FW	ROU	Mate Bendoni
10	MF	ROU	Cristin Gubics
11	MF	ROU	Vlad Țap
13	MF	ROU	Paul Țap

No.	Pos.	Nation	Player
15	FW	ROU	Sergiu Marușca
16	DF	ROU	Răzvan Măgui
17	MF	ROU	Sebastian Petruț
19	DF	ROU	Sergiu Pîrcălab
20	MF	ROU	Vlad Crăciune
21	FW	ROU	Claudiu Pelmuș
23	DF	ROU	Raul Prodan
29	FW	ROU	Octavian Venczel
38	GK	ROU	Robert Bodea
99	GK	ROU	Gino Ardelean
—	MF	ROU	Paul Buda
—	MF	ROU	Narcis Lăzău

=== Out on loan ===
Note: Flags indicate national team as defined under FIFA eligibility rules; some limited exceptions apply. Players may hold more than one non-FIFA nationality.

No. / Pos. / Nation / Player	No. / Pos. / Nation / Player

== Club officials ==
=== Board of directors ===
Role	Name
Owner	(Romania) Town of Aleșd
President	(Romania) Ciprian Fogarași

=== Current technical staff ===
Role	Name
Manager	(Romania) Ciprian Fogarași
Assistant coach	(Romania) Adrian Chiș

== Notable former players ==
- (Romania) Adrian Anca
- (Romania) Ioan Ciursaș
- (Romania) Iosif Erdei
- (Romania) Ciprian Fogarași
