= Crișul Stadium (Aleșd) =

Sports venue in Aleșd, Romania

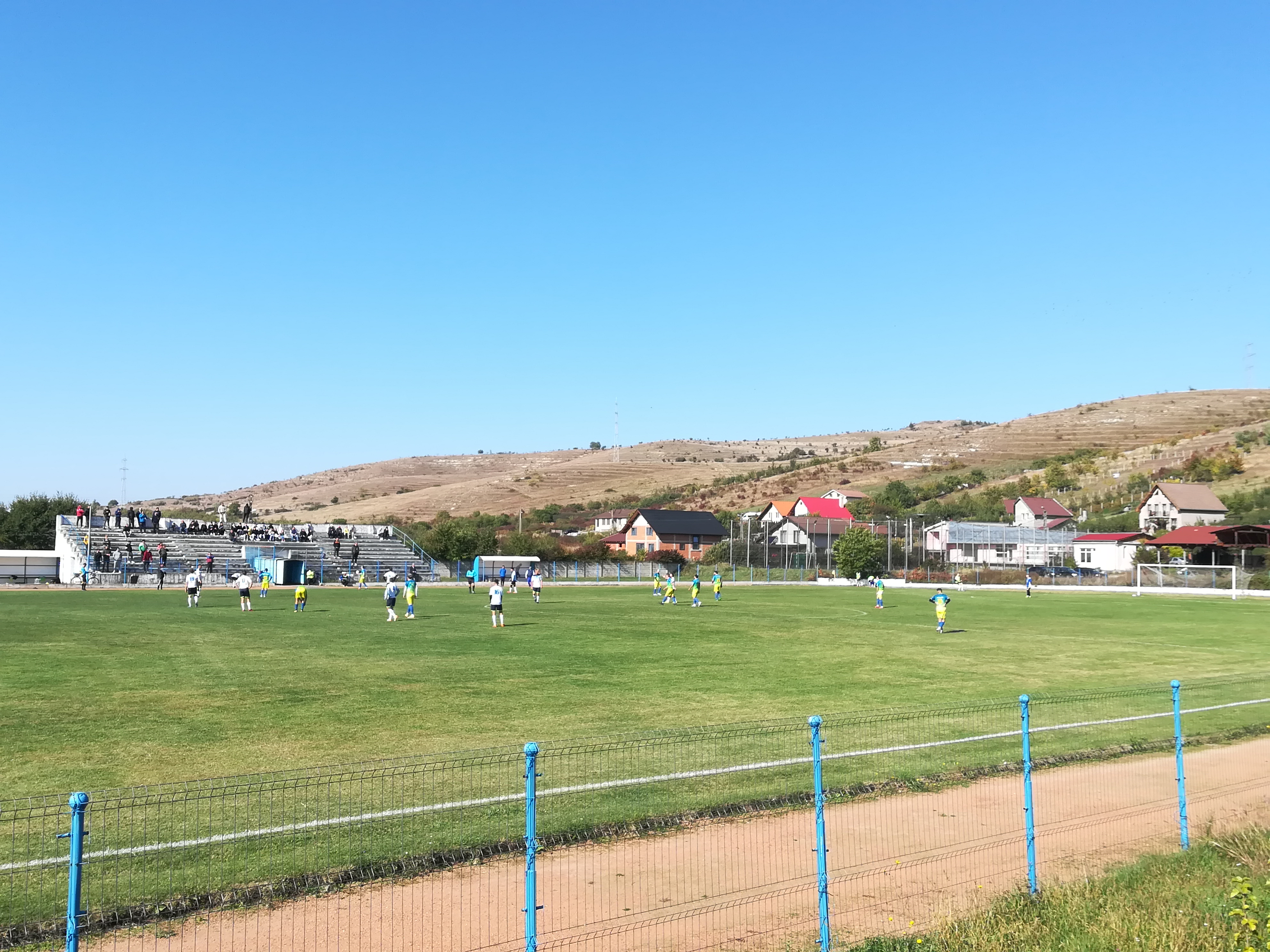
- Interactive map of Crișul Stadium
- Address: Str. Sportului, nr. 17
- Location: Aleșd, Romania
- Coordinates: 47°03′46.1″N 22°23′00.1″E
- Owner: Town of Aleșd
- Operator: Crișul Aleșd
- Capacity: 800 (no seats)
- Surface: Grass

Construction
- Opened: 1920s
- Renovated: 2000s

Tenant
- Crișul Aleșd (1921–present)

Crișul Stadium is a multi-purpose stadium in Aleșd, Romania. It is currently used mostly for football matches, is the home ground of Crișul Aleșd and has a capacity of 800 people.
