= Căciulata =

Căciulata may refer to several villages in Romania:

- a village in Râciu Commune, Mureș County
- a village in the town of Călimăneşti, Vâlcea County
