= Erdei =

Erdei [ˈɛrdɛi] or Erdey is a Hungarian topographic surname originally used to denote a person living or working in or near a woodland or forest (Hungarian: erdő). Notable people with the surname include:

== Erdei ==
- Carlo Erdei (born 1996), Romanian football player
- Iosif Erdei
- János Erdei
- Ferenc Erdei (1910–1971), Hungarian politician
- Viktor Erdei (1879–1945), Hungarian artist
- Zsolt Erdei (born 1974), Hungarian boxer

== Erdey ==
- Dale M. Erdey (born 1954), American politician
- Tibor Erdey-Grúz (1902–1976), Hungarian chemist and politician

== See also ==
- Erdélyi
