= Izvor (Crișul Repede) =

River in Romania

- Location within Romania

Location
- Country: Romania
- Counties: Bihor County
- Villages: Peștiș, Aleșd

Physical characteristics
- Source: Plopiș Mountains
- Mouth: Crișul Repede
  - coordinates: 47.0504°N 22.3800°E
- Length: 12 km (7.5 mi)
- Basin size: 56 km^{2} (22 sq mi)

Basin features
- Progression: Crișul Repede→ Körös→ Tisza→ Danube→ Black Sea
- Tributaries
  - left: Valea Morii
  - right: Secătura
- River code: III.1.44.19

The Izvor is a right tributary of the river Crișul Repede in Romania. It flows into the Crișul Repede near Aleșd. Its length is 12 km (7.5 mi) and its basin size is 56 km^{2} (22 sq mi).
