= Secătura =

- Location within Romania

Location
- Country: Romania
- Counties: Bihor County
- Villages: Peștiș

Physical characteristics
- Source: Plopiș Mountains
- Mouth: Izvor
  - location: Peștiș
  - coordinates: 47.0710°N 22.4100°E
- Length: 9 km (5.6 mi)
- Basin size: 14 km^{2} (5.4 sq mi)

Basin features
- Progression: Izvor→ Crișul Repede→ Körös→ Tisza→ Danube→ Black Sea
- River code: III.1.44.19.2

The Secătura is a right tributary of the river Izvor in Romania. It flows into the Izvor in Peștiș. Its length is 9 km (5.6 mi) and its basin size is 14 km^{2} (5.4 sq mi).
