= Turdaș (river) =

Turdaș Tordos-patak
- Location within Romania

Location
- Country: Romania
- Counties: Hunedoara County
- Villages: Dâncu Mare, Turmaș, Turdaș

Physical characteristics
- Mouth: Mureș
  - location: Turdaș
  - coordinates: 45.8629°N 23.1467°E
- Length: 14 km (8.7 mi)
- Basin size: 65 km^{2} (25 sq mi)

Basin features
- Progression: Mureș→ Tisza→ Danube→ Black Sea
- Tributaries
  - left: Mărtinești

The Turdaș (Hungarian: Tordos-patak) is a left tributary of the river Mureș in Romania. It discharges into the Mureș in the village Turdaș. Its length is 14 km (8.7 mi) and its basin size is 65 km^{2} (25 sq mi).
