= Zsolt Bodoni =

Hungarian painter (born 1975)

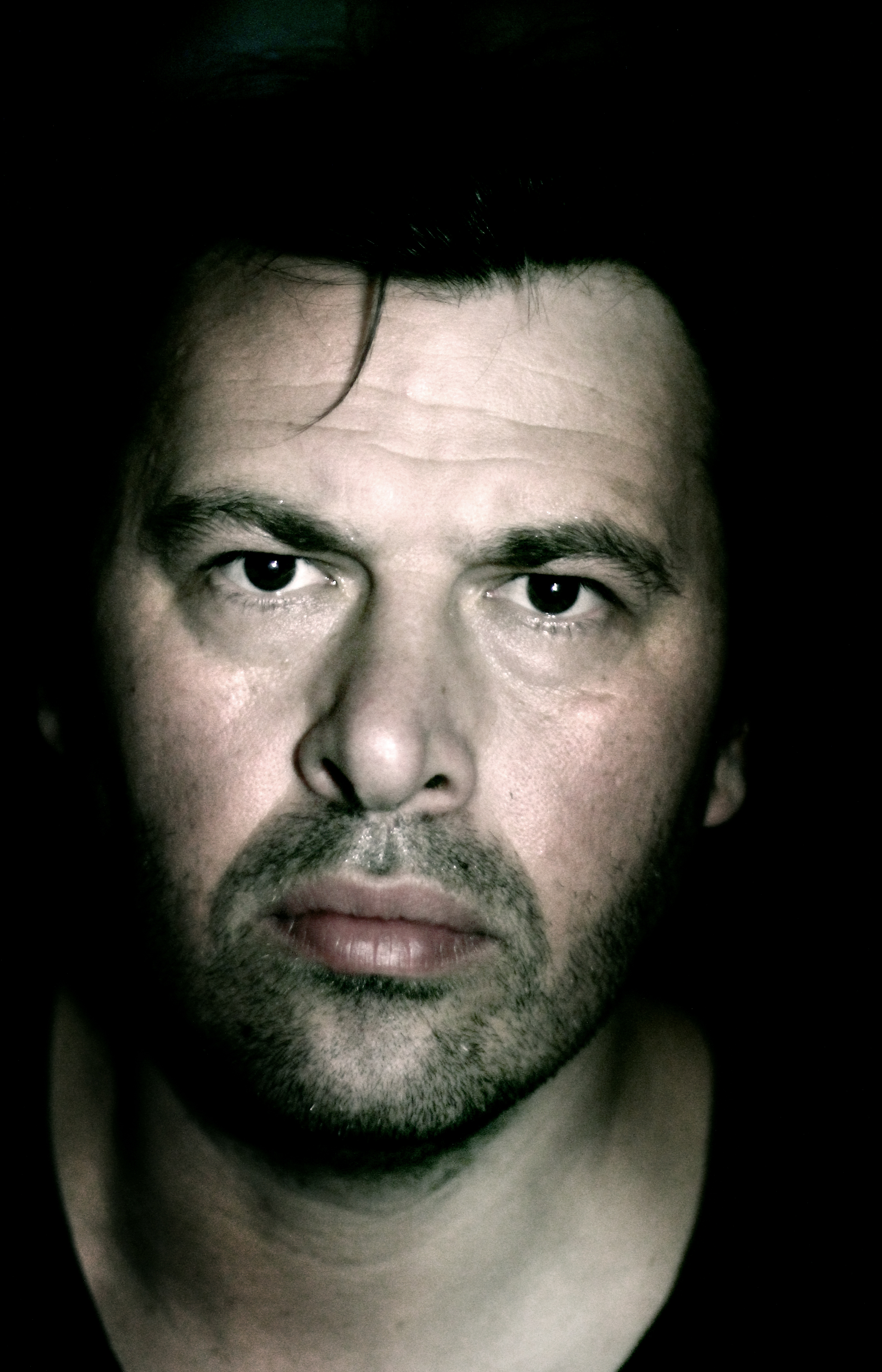
- Born: 1975 (age 50–51); Aleșd, Romania
- Occupation: Painter

Zsolt Bodoni (born 1975) is a Hungarian painter who lives and works in Oradea, Romania.

== Work ==
Bodoni’s art observes and reflects upon this historical scenario with skepticism or irony.

His work primarily consists of large-scale, expressive figurative painting.

== Biography ==
Bodoni was born in Aleșd, Romania, and studied at the Hungarian Academy of Fine Arts in Budapest, receiving his M.F.A. in 2000. Originally trained as a graphichan, he turned his attention to painting in the mid-nineties. After 20 years spent in Budapest, Hungary, in 2014 he returned in his homeland, Transylvania. He is the co-founder of the Art colony of Elesd, a one-month artist residency in his natal town, since 1997.

== Exhibitions and projects ==
- 2008 Monuments, FA Projects, London, UK
- 2007 10 years of the Art Colony of Élesd, Ernst Múzeum, Budapest, Hungary

== Selected bibliography and press ==
- 2010 Sicha, Choire. "The 23 Must-Buy Artists of the 2010 Miami Art Fairs." The Awl, web. Dec 6 th .
- 2008 Rudkin, Joe. "Portraits of Yesterday, Today and Tomorrow." Flavorpill London, 2008

== Collections ==
Bodoni's work is held in the following public collection:

- Knoxville Museum of Art

== Distinctions ==
- Top 100 Emerging Artists by Flash Art, 2009
