= Turdaș =

- Commune
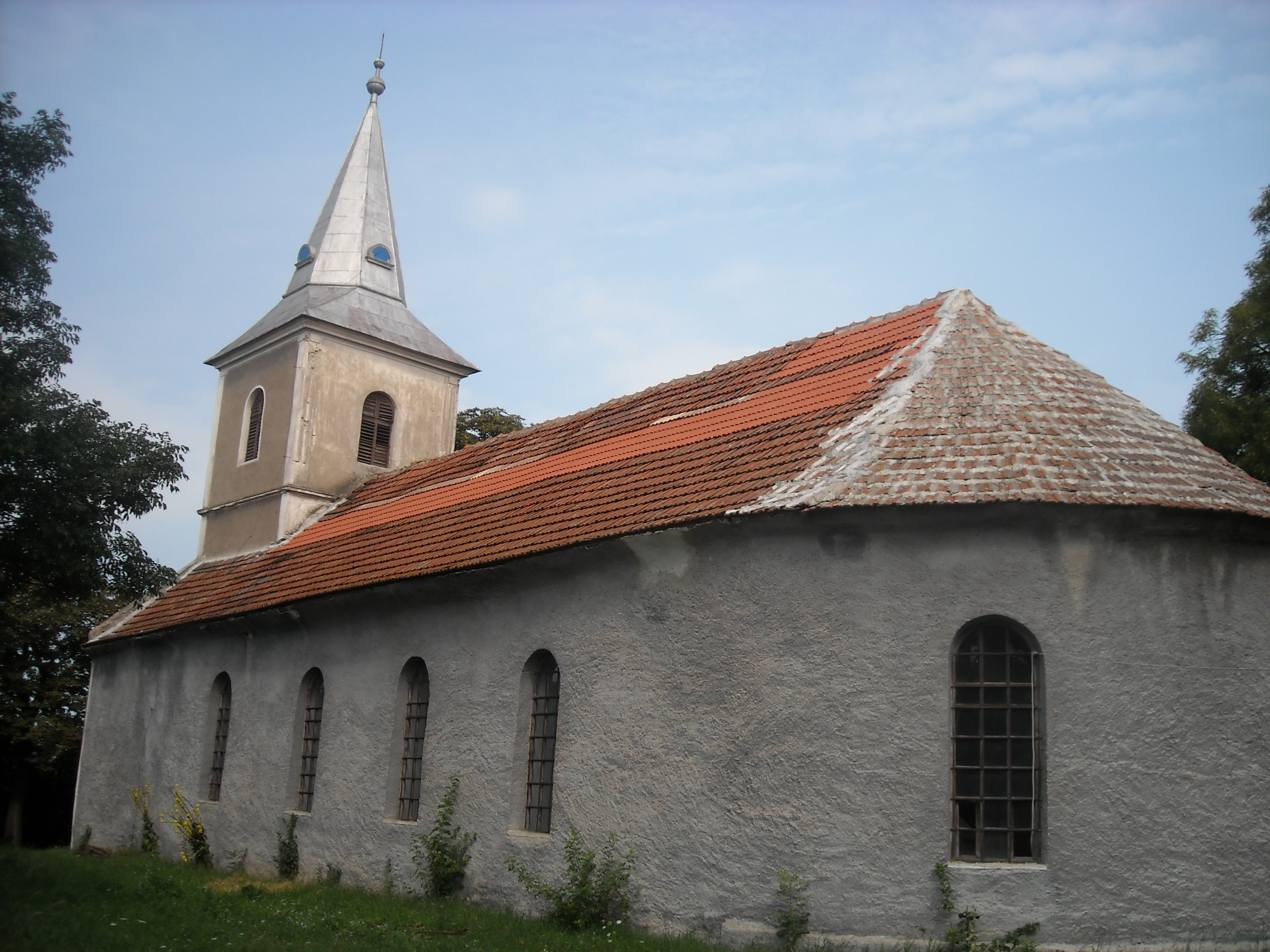
- Reformed church in Turdaș

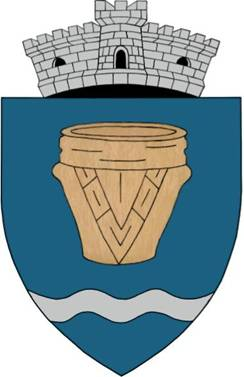
- Coat of arms

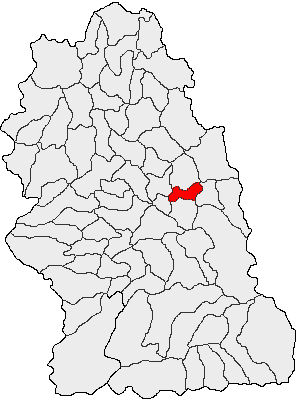
- Location in Hunedoara County

- Location in Romania
- Coordinates: 45.853°N 23.123°E
- Country: Romania
- County: Hunedoara

Government
  - Mayor (2024–2028): Remi Bocșeri (PSD)
- Area: 32.78 km^{2} (12.66 sq mi)
- Elevation: 203 m (666 ft)
- Population (2021-12-01): 1,791
  - Density: 54.64/km^{2} (141.5/sq mi)
- Time zone: UTC+02:00 (EET)
  - Summer (DST): UTC+03:00 (EEST)
- Postal code: 337495
- Area code: (+40) 02 54
- Vehicle reg.: HD
- Website: www.turdas.ro

Turdaș (Hungarian: Tordos, German: Tordesch) is a commune in Hunedoara County, Transylvania, Romania. It is composed of four villages: Pricaz (Perkász), Râpaș (Répás), Spini (Pád), and Turdaș.

Turdaș lies on the left bank of the Mureș River, which surrounds the village to the north and west. The Turdaș River discharges into the Mureș in the village Turdaș. To the east is the Sitiș stream, which separates the Turdaș and Pricaz villages. The commune is located in the central-east part of Hunedoara County, 6 km (3.7 mi) from Orăștie and 20 km (12 mi) from the county seat, Deva.

Turdaș has been attested to in various relics found in museums in Germany and Romania. The first is a tax collector report dated to 1334, where in the Catholic priest paid one silver mark in taxes; the Germans in the region were Catholic until the 16th century. According to the report the village had 56 "smokes" or chimneys, i.e., houses. Turdaș is located in an area of Transylvanian Saxon settlement, and the village traditionally had a strong German population.

This is the location of the Turdaș archaeological site, some 7000 years old. The archaeological site was a large Neolithic/Chalcolithic settlement along the course of the river Mureș. It was first researched by Zsófia Torma. The sub-culture Vinča-Turdaș (a late, regional variation of the Vinča culture) is named after this site. Some archaeological culture layers at this site are contemporary with the site at Tărtăria.

Historical population
Year	Pop.	±%
1850	1,858	—
1977	2,280	+22.7%
2002	1,955	−14.3%
2011	1,801	−7.9%
2021	1,791	−0.6%
Source: Census data

== Natives ==
- Aurel Vlad (1875 – 1953), lawyer and politician who served as Finance Minister in 1919–1920.
