= Iosif Erdei =

Romanian footballer

Personal information
- Full name: Iosif Erdei
- Date of birth: 15 August 1974
- Place of birth: Șuncuiuș, Romania
- Date of death: 6 December 2014 (aged 40)
- Position: Midfielder

Youth career
- Minerul Șuncuiuș

Senior career*
Years	Team	Apps	(Gls)
1988–1992	Minerul Șuncuiuș		
1992–1993	Crișul Aleșd		
1993–1995	FC Bihor Oradea		
1995	→ UTA Arad (loan)		
1995–1996	FC Brașov		
1997	Rapid București		
1998–	Olimpia Satu Mare		
- FC Bihor Oradea
- Crișul Aleșd
- * Club domestic league appearances and goals

Iosif Erdei (15 August 1974 – 6 December 2014) was a Romanian footballer who played as a midfielder.

== Career ==
At the age of 14, Erdei was already in the team for his hometown club Minerul Șuncuiuș, and at the age of 18 he moved to Crișul Aleșd.

In 1993 he moved to FC Bihor Oradea in the second division Divizia B, and during his military service he also briefly played for UTA Arad.

In 1995 he moved to the first division club FC Brașov in Divizia A, but an illness in 1996 interrupted his career for a year.

Nevertheless, coach Mircea Lucescu brought him to Rapid București in 1997, and he later played for Olimpia Satu Mare and again for FC Bihor Oradea. He ended his career with Crișul Aleșd in the third division.

After his career ended, Erdei founded a company and became involved in local politics. In December 2014 he died of a heart attack. In his honor, the stadium of his hometown club Minerul Șuncuiuș was renamed after him in the summer of 2016.
