= Vice-voivode of Transylvania =

Deputy of the voivode in the Kingdom of Hungary

The vice-voivode of Transylvania (Hungarian: erdélyi alvajda; Latin: vicevoyvada) was the deputy of the voivode of Transylvania in the Kingdom of Hungary. The office first appeared in contemporary sources in 1221. From the early 15th century, the voivodes rarely visited Transylvania, permanently leaving the administration of the counties to the vice-voivodes, who often belonged to their voivodes' allegiance. They held some judicial powers

== List of vice-voivodes ==
Term	Incumbent	Voivode	Notes	Source
1221	Bocha	Paul, son of Peter	"vicarius [...] woyvodae"	
1278	Rubinus Hermán	Finta Aba	"vicevoyvada"	
1282	Nicholas	Roland Borsa	"vicevoyvoda Transsilvanus"	
1288–1291	Ladislaus Borsa	Roland Borsa	"vicevoyouoda Transilvanus"; his deputy was Benedict	
1296	John	Ladislaus Kán	"vicewoywoda"	
b. 1300	Andrew Gyógyi	Ladislaus Kán	mentioned as "former" vice-voivode in 1300; he possibly held the dignity simultaneously with Ladislaus Borsa	
1303–1314	Achilles Torockói	Ladislaus Kán	first term	
1319–1320	Nicholas Vásári	Dózsa Debreceni		
1321	Achilles Torockói	Dózsa Debreceni	second term	
1324–1330	Michael Zsuki	Thomas Szécsényi	also ispán of Kolozs County (1324)	
1334–1336	Simon Zsámboki	Thomas Szécsényi		
1337–1342	Peter Derencsényi	Thomas Szécsényi	"the Nosed"	
1343–1344	Ladislaus Tolcsvai	Nicholas Sirokai		
1345–1349	Peter Váradjai	Stephen Lackfi	first term; also castellan of Kecskés	
1351–1352	Egidius Tornai	Nicholas Kont		
1352–1356	Stephen Ravasz	Nicholas Kont		
1356–1359	Dominic Mocsk	Andrew Lackfi		
1359–1368	Peter Váradjai	Denis Lackfi, then Nicholas Lackfi	second term; also castellan of Hátszeg (1360); killed in the Wallachian campaign	
1369–1372	John Lépes	Emeric Lackfi	Pál Engel erroneously identified him as John Görbedi; appointed as vice-palatine in 1372	
1372–1373	Ladislaus Derencsényi	Stephen Lackfi of Csáktornya	son of Peter Derencsényi (1337–1342); Pál Engel incorrectly claimed that he was killed the Wallachian campaign of 1368	
1374–1376	Ladislaus Nadabi, Sr.	Stephen Lackfi of Csáktornya		
1376–1385	John Temesi	Ladislaus Losonci	first term	
1386	Stephen Fáncs	Stephen Lackfi of Csáktornya		
1386–1389	John Temesi	Ladislaus Losonci	second term	
1390–1392	Ladislaus	Ladislaus Losonci	his identification is uncertain	
1392–1393	Bartholomew Szobi	Emeric Bebek		
1394–1395	Peter Verébi	Frank Szécsényi		
1396	John Váradjai	Stibor of Stiboricz	son of Peter Váradjai (1345–1349; 1359–1368); killed in the Battle of Nicopolis	
1396–1401	John of Swerch	Stibor of Stiboricz		
1401–1402	Michael Nádasi	Simon Szécsényi		
1402–1403	Lawrence Nadabi	Nicholas Csáki & Nicholas Marcali		
1402–1403	Stephen Nadabi	Nicholas Csáki & Nicholas Marcali	son of Ladislaus Nadabi, Sr. (1374–1376)	
1404–1408	Peter Sztrigyi	John Tamási & James Lack		
1404–1406	Ladislaus Nadányi	John Tamási & James Lack		
1406–1409	John Dobokai	John Tamási & James Lack		
1408–1409	John Geréb, Sr.	John Tamási & James Lack		
1410–1415	Ladislaus Nadabi, Jr.	Stibor of Stiboricz, then vacant	son of Ladislaus Nadabi, Sr. (1374–1376) and brother of Stephen Nadabi (1402–1403)	
1415–1438	Roland Lépes	Nicholas Csáki, then Ladislaus Csáki, then Peter Cseh	nephew of John Lépes (1369–1372); ispán of Küküllő County (1434); Transylvanian peasant revolt broke out	
1437	Demetrius Pányi	Peter Cseh	alongside Roland Lépes (1415–1438)	
1439–1446	Nicholas Vízaknai	Desiderius Losonci, then Nicholas Jakcs & Michael Jakcs, then Nicholas Újlaki & John Hunyadi	first term; for John Hunyadi after 1441; appointed deputy governor of Transylvania in 1446	
1441–1444	George Pongrác	Nicholas Újlaki & John Hunyadi	for John Hunyadi, killed in the Battle of Varna	
1441	Peter Szerecsen	Nicholas Újlaki & John Hunyadi	for Nicholas Újlaki	
1441–1444	Ladislaus Buzlai	Nicholas Újlaki & John Hunyadi	for Nicholas Újlaki	
1443	George Csupor	Nicholas Újlaki & John Hunyadi	for John Hunyadi	
1444–1446	Gregory Bodó	Nicholas Újlaki & John Hunyadi	for Nicholas Újlaki	
1446–1450	Mark Herepei	Nicholas Újlaki & Emeric Bebek & John Rozgonyi	for Nicholas Újlaki	
1446–1449	George Balai	Nicholas Újlaki & Emeric Bebek & John Rozgonyi	for Emeric Bebek; titular vice-voivodeship after the Battle of Kosovo (1448), where Bebek was killed	
1447	Stephen Jánosi	Nicholas Újlaki & Emeric Bebek & John Rozgonyi	possibly for governor John Hunyadi	
1448	Nicholas Erdélyi	Nicholas Újlaki & Emeric Bebek & John Rozgonyi	possibly for governor John Hunyadi	
1449–1450	Michael Dormánházi	Nicholas Újlaki & Emeric Bebek & John Rozgonyi	for John Rozgonyi	
1450	John Geréb, Jr.	Nicholas Újlaki & Emeric Bebek & John Rozgonyi	son of John Geréb, Sr. (1408–1409); for governor John Hunyadi	
1450	Denis Veres	Nicholas Újlaki & Emeric Bebek & John Rozgonyi	for governor John Hunyadi	
1450–1460	George Rikalf	Nicholas Újlaki & Emeric Bebek & John Rozgonyi	for John Rozgonyi	
1452–1456	Bronisław of Zlibow	Nicholas Újlaki & Emeric Bebek & John Rozgonyi	for John Rozgonyi	
1456–1458	Stephen Kemény	Nicholas Újlaki & Emeric Bebek & John Rozgonyi	for the Hunyadi family	
1458–1460	Sigismund Sártványi	John Rozgonyi & Sebastian Rozgonyi & Ladislaus Kanizsai & Nicholas Kanizsai	for the Rozgonyi family	
1458–1459	Farkas Szerdahelyi	John Rozgonyi & Sebastian Rozgonyi & Ladislaus Kanizsai & Nicholas Kanizsai		
1459–1462	Benedict Gibárt	John Rozgonyi & Sebastian Rozgonyi & Ladislaus Kanizsai & Nicholas Kanizsai		
1460	Nicholas Vízaknai	John Rozgonyi & Sebastian Rozgonyi & Ladislaus Kanizsai & Nicholas Kanizsai	second term	
1461–1462	George Szentiványi	John Rozgonyi & Sebastian Rozgonyi & Ladislaus Kanizsai & Nicholas Kanizsai		
1462–1465	Nicholas Vízaknai	John Pongrác	third term	
1462–1465	Stephen Erdélyi	John Pongrác	first term; brother of Nicholas Erdélyi (1448)	
1465–1467	Ladislaus Nádasdi	Sigismund Szentgyörgyi & John Szentgyörgyi & Bertold Ellerbach		
1466–1467	John Illyei	Sigismund Szentgyörgyi & John Szentgyörgyi & Bertold Ellerbach		
1468–1472	John Rédei	John Pongrác & Nicholas Csupor		
1468–1472	Dominic Bethlen	John Pongrác & Nicholas Csupor	first term	
1472	John Váradi	John Pongrác & Nicholas Csupor		
1474–1475	Peter Kis	Blaise Magyar		
1475–1476	Dominic Bethlen	John Pongrác	second term	
1476	Stephen Erdélyi	John Pongrác	second term	
1477	Dominic Bethlen	Peter Geréb	third term	
1477–1479	Anton Kendi	Peter Geréb		
1482–1486	Stephen Horvát	Stephen Báthory	also vice-ispán of Zaránd County	
1483–1484	John Werbőczy	Stephen Báthory	"deputy of the voivode"	
1486	Lazarus Zsoldos	Stephen Báthory		
1487–1493	Stephen Telegdi	Stephen Báthory	first term	
1492	Michael Almási	Stephen Báthory		

== See also ==
- Voivode of Transylvania

== Sources ==
- C. Tóth, Norbert; Horváth, Richárd; Neumann, Tibor; Pálosfalvi, Tamás (2016). Magyarország világi archontológiája, 1458–1526, I. Főpapok és bárók [Secular Archontology of Hungary, 1458–1526, Volume I: Prelates and Barons] (in Hungarian). MTA Bölcsészettudományi Kutatóközpont Történettudományi Intézete. ISBN 978-963-4160-35-9.
- Engel, Pál (1996a). Magyarország világi archontológiája, 1301–1457, I. [Secular Archontology of Hungary, 1301–1457, Volume I] (in Hungarian). História, MTA Történettudományi Intézete. ISBN 963-8312-44-0.
- Engel, Pál (1996b). "Néhány XIV. századi erdélyi alvajda származása [Origins of Some Vice-Voivodes of Transylvania from the 14th Century]". In Kovács, András; Sipos, Gábor; Tonk, Sándor (eds.). Emlékkönyv Jakó Zsigmond születésének nyolcvanadik évfordulójára (in Hungarian). Erdélyi Múzeum Egyesület. pp. 176–186. ISBN 973-96946-7-5.
- Hegyi, Géza; W. Kovács, András (2016). "Néhány erdélyi alvajda azonosításáról [Identification of Some Vice-Voivodes of Transylvania]". In Dáné, Veronka; Lupescu-Makó, Mária; Sipos, Gábor (eds.). Testimonio litteratum. Tanulmányok Jakó Zsigmond tiszteletére (in Hungarian). Erdélyi Múzeum Egyesület. pp. 151–168. ISBN 978-606-739-054-4.
- W. Kovács, András (2012). "Remarks on the Careers of the Vice-voivodes of Transylvania in the Late Middle Ages (1458–1526)". Transylvanian Review. 21 (Suppl. no. 2). Romanian Cultural Foundation: 103–138. ISSN 1221-1249.
- Zsoldos, Attila (2011). Magyarország világi archontológiája, 1000–1301 [Secular Archontology of Hungary, 1000–1301] (in Hungarian). História, MTA Történettudományi Intézete. ISBN 978-963-9627-38-3.
