= Erdély =

Erdély is a Hungarian surname. The word is the Hungarian name for Transylvania. Notable people with the surname include:

- Andrei Erdely, Romanian speed skater
- Csanád Erdély (born 1996), Hungarian ice hockey player
- Dániel Erdély (born 1956), graphic artist
- Mátyás Erdély, Hungarian cinematographer
- Miklós Erdély (1928–1986), Hungarian architect, writer, poet, artist, and film director
- Sabrina Erdely (born 1971/1972), American magazine reporter known for the defamatory Rolling Stone article "A Rape on Campus"
- Sándor Erdély, Hungarian politician and jurist

== See also ==
- Erdélyi, a surname
- Vasile Erdeli (1794–1862), Romanian bishop
