= Mihály Erdélyi =

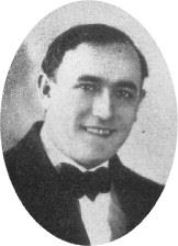
Mihály Erdélyi

Mihály Erdélyi (28 May 1895 – 27 January 1979) was a Hungarian composer, lyricist, actor, and producer, particularly prolific in the interwar period. Erdélyi was born in Szeged in 1895 and began a career as an actor then a stage producer, but became most famous for his operettas, including Csókos regiment (1932), Fehérvári huszárok (1933), A csavargólány (1936), Sárgapitykés közlegény (1937), A zimberi-zombori szépasszony (1939), Sárgarigófészek (1940), Vedd le a kalapod a honvéd előtt (1942), and A két kapitány (1943). Many of his songs have entered the Hungarian musical canon as folk music, often without an awareness of the original composer.

A dorozsmai szélmalom brought Erdélyi the most lasting fame, and the title piece of the operetta was the subject of many covers and arrangements by popular musicians of the time, including Georges Boulanger, Barnabás von Géczy, Zarah Leander, Will Glahé, Ilja Livschakoff and Karsten Troyke. The piece was usually arranged as a slow foxtrot under the titles of Puszta fox or Le Moulin de Dorozsmà. It gained popularity in South America under the title of Amor en Budapest and in Yiddish as just Budapesht.

Many of Erdélyi's works were patriotic or focused on members of the military. As the communist government took power after the war, Erdélyi was blacklisted. He briefly returned to the stage as an actor from 1955 to 1958, but this represented his only theatre-related work after the war. He died in Budapest in 1979 at the age of 83.
