= Aleșd =

- Town
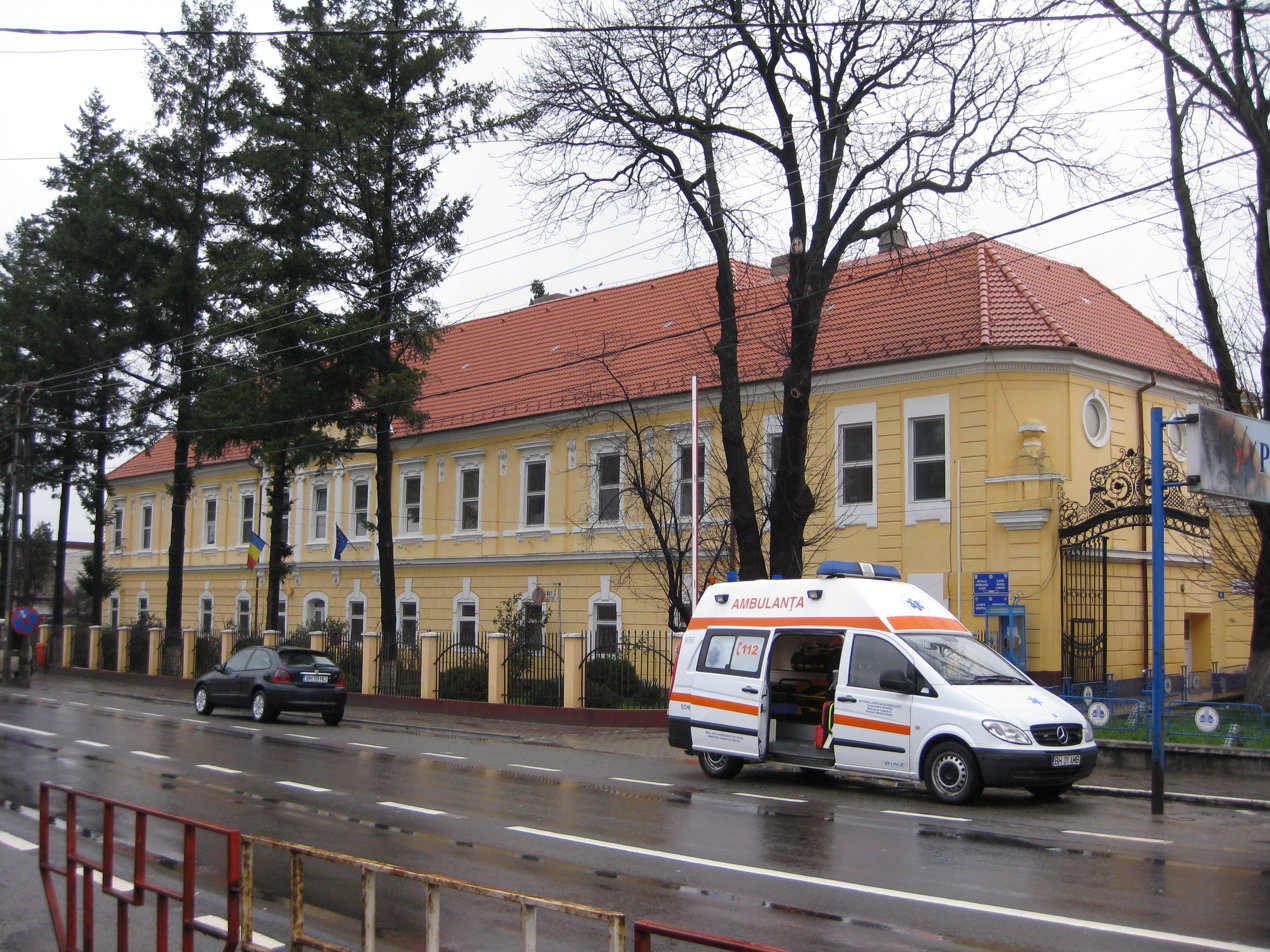
- Aleșd Hospital, former Batthyany-Bethlen Castle

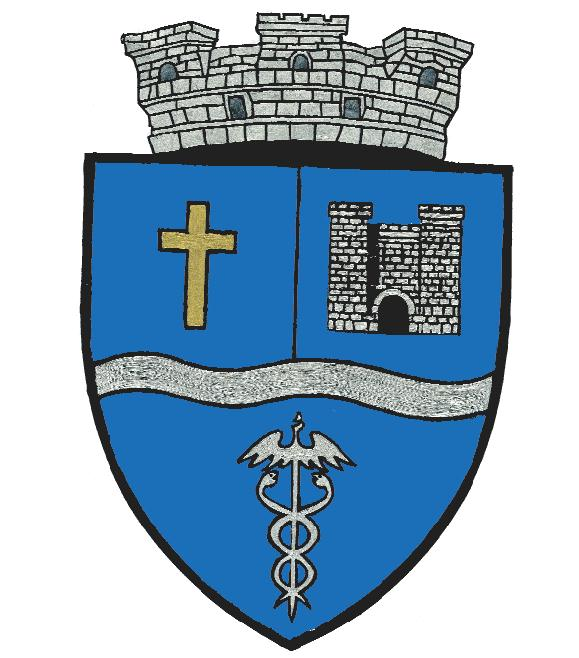
- Coat of arms

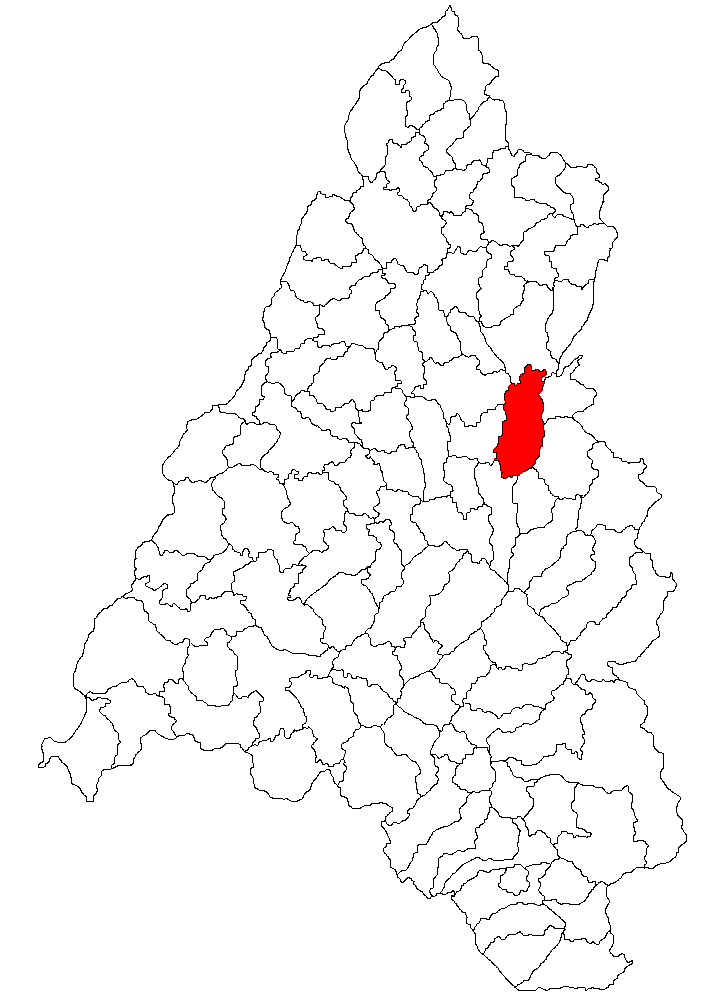
- Location within Bihor County

- Location in Romania
- Coordinates: 47°3′26″N 22°23′49″E
- Country: Romania
- County: Bihor

Government
  - Mayor (2024–2028): Ioan Coloman Todoca (PNL)
- Area: 71.95 km^{2} (27.78 sq mi)
- Elevation: 233 m (764 ft)
- Population (2021-12-01): 9,662
  - Density: 134.3/km^{2} (347.8/sq mi)
- Time zone: UTC+02:00 (EET)
  - Summer (DST): UTC+03:00 (EEST)
- Postal code: 415100
- Area code: (+40) 02 59
- Vehicle reg.: BH
- Website: www.alesd-bihor.ro

Aleșd (Romanian pronunciation: [aˈleʃd]; Hungarian: Élesd, Slovak: Alešď) is a town in Bihor County, western Romania. It administers three villages: Pădurea Neagră (Feketeerdő), Peștiș (Sólyomkőpestes), and Tinăud (Tinód).

== Geography ==
The town is located in the east of the county, near the border with Cluj County, at the foot of the Apuseni Mountains. It lies on the banks of the river Crișul Repede, where the Vadu Crișului – Aștileu Canal connects with the river. The river Izvor flows into the Crișul Repede near Aleșd; the river Secătura flows into the Izvor in Peștiș village.

Aleșd is located on the CFR main railway line between Oradea and Bucharest. Consequently, it is served by frequent rapid and intercity (IC) trains from Cluj-Napoca, Bucharest, Arad, and Timișoara. Aleșd is located in the eastern part of Bihor County, on national road DN1 (European route E60), at a distance of 38 km (24 mi) from Oradea and 112 km (70 mi) from Cluj-Napoca.

== History ==
At first Aleșd was on the shores of the Crișul Repede River (meaning ”The fast river”), in its floodplain. In the first half of the 18th century, the population moved to the terrace on the right bank of the Crișul Repede, in the place that it occupies today. The move was made to escape the frequent floods.

From the beginning, Aleşd belonged to the domain of the Piatra Şoimului Fortress. The first documentary attestation dates back to 1291, under the name Elusd. In 1406 Aleşd appears in documents under the name Willa Eleesd, in 1699 by Illesd and in the following century under the name of today Elesd (in Romanian Aleşd), throughout this period the locality passed through the ownership of several nobles. In the second half of the 18th century, Aleşd generated significant income from trade, crafts, taverns, milling and ţuică boiling cauldrons.

Aleşd, and with it all the localities in the area, came out of Ottoman rule in 1692, with the defeat of the Turks and the abolition of the paşalak of Oradea. Ottoman rule was replaced by the Habsburg one.

In the 18th century, the main occupation of the inhabitants of Aleşd was agriculture, i.e. cereal cultivation, viticulture, fruit growing and animal husbandry. Significant income was generated from crafts (but also from brandy boilers) and furriers, turners and blacksmiths were renowned in the surrounding areas.

In the 19th century, significant changes occurred in the population structure by activity. 55% of the population earned their living from non-agricultural branches of activity, and 45% from agriculture. 24% lived from industrial activities and 15% from economic activities in the wood exploitation and processing sector.

After the break-up of Austria-Hungary at the end of World War I, the Hungarian town passed under Romanian administration during the Hungarian–Romanian War of 1919, and became part of the Kingdom of Romania in April 1920. During the interwar period, the town became the headquarters of plasa Aleșd of Bihor County. As a result of the Second Vienna Award, it was returned to Hungary in August 1940, staying under Hungarian administration until October 1944, towards the end of World War II. Following the administrative reform of 1950, it became the seat of Aleșd raion within Bihor Region (renamed Oradea Region in 1952 and Crișana Region in 1960). In 1968, the old territorial division into județe was reinstituted, and the Aleșd reverted to being part of Bihor County, and was declared a town that year.

== Population ==
Historical population
Year	Pop.	±%
1880	3,683	—
1890	3,981	+8.1%
1900	4,608	+15.7%
1910	5,695	+23.6%
1920	5,667	−0.5%
1930	4,544	−19.8%
1941	4,646	+2.2%
1956	5,690	+22.5%
1966	6,371	+12.0%
1977	9,608	+50.8%
1992	10,920	+13.7%
2002	10,852	−0.6%
2011	9,619	−11.4%
2021	9,662	+0.4%
Source: Census data

At the census from 2011, the town had a population of 9,619, made up of Romanians (63.9%), Hungarians (16.04%), Roma (12.73%), Slovaks (6.59%), and others (0.42%). According to the 2021 census, Aleșd has a population of 9,662; of those, 58.86% were Romanians, 15,63% Roma, 11.44% Hungarians, 6.06% Slovaks, and 7.8% of unknown ethnicity.

== Administration ==
The town of Aleșd is run by a mayor and a local council composed of 17 councilors. The mayor, Ioan Coloman Todoca, from the National Liberal Party, was elected in 2016.

== Notable residents ==
- Zsolt Bodoni, painter who lives in Oradea and was born in 1975 in Aleșd.
- Miklós Radnóti (1909–1944), poet and teacher who served his labor draft during World War II in Aleșd.
- Ilie Bolojan, liberal politician, the current Prime Minister of Romania.

== Gallery ==
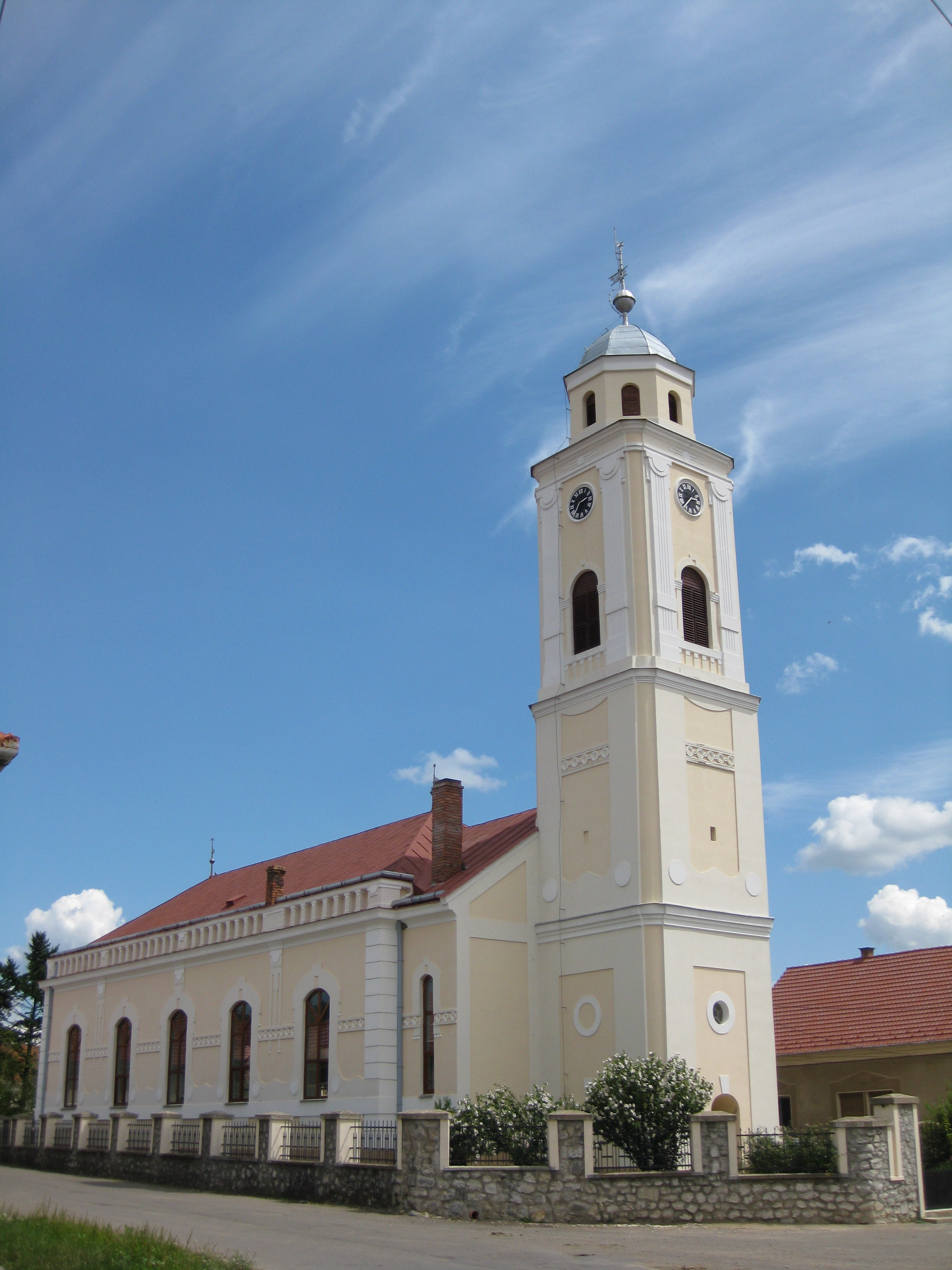
Reformed church

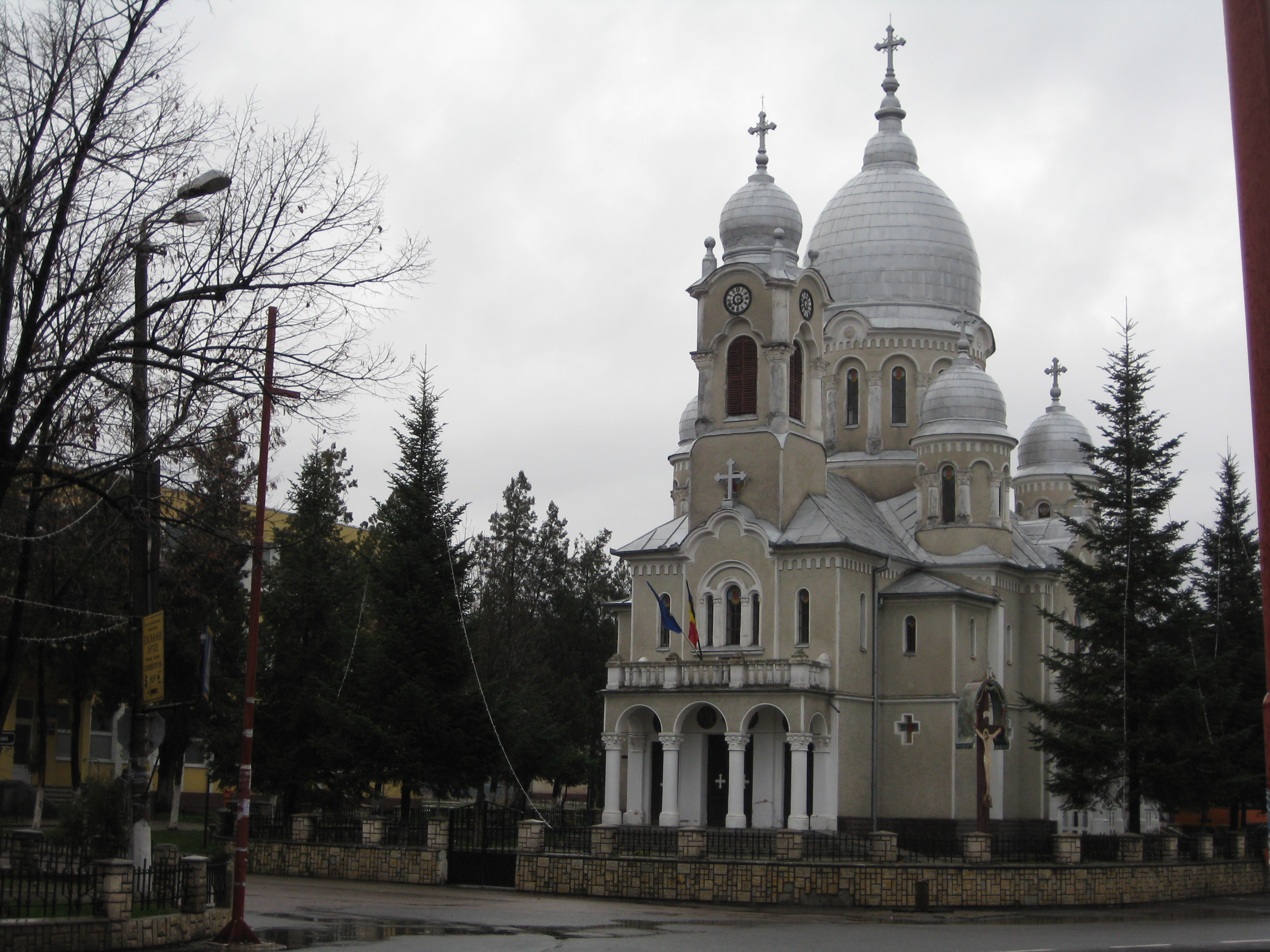
Orthodox church

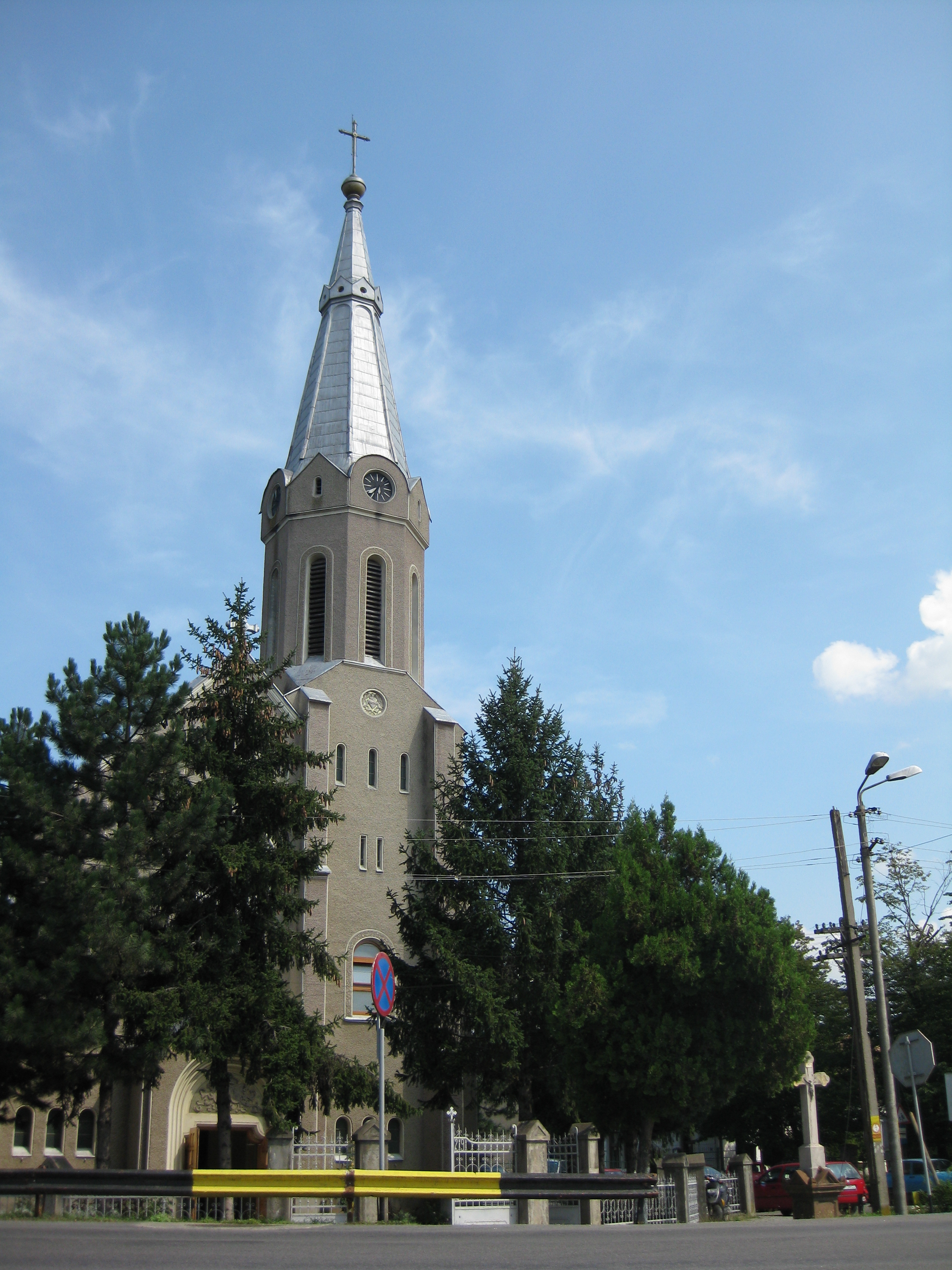
Roman Catholic church

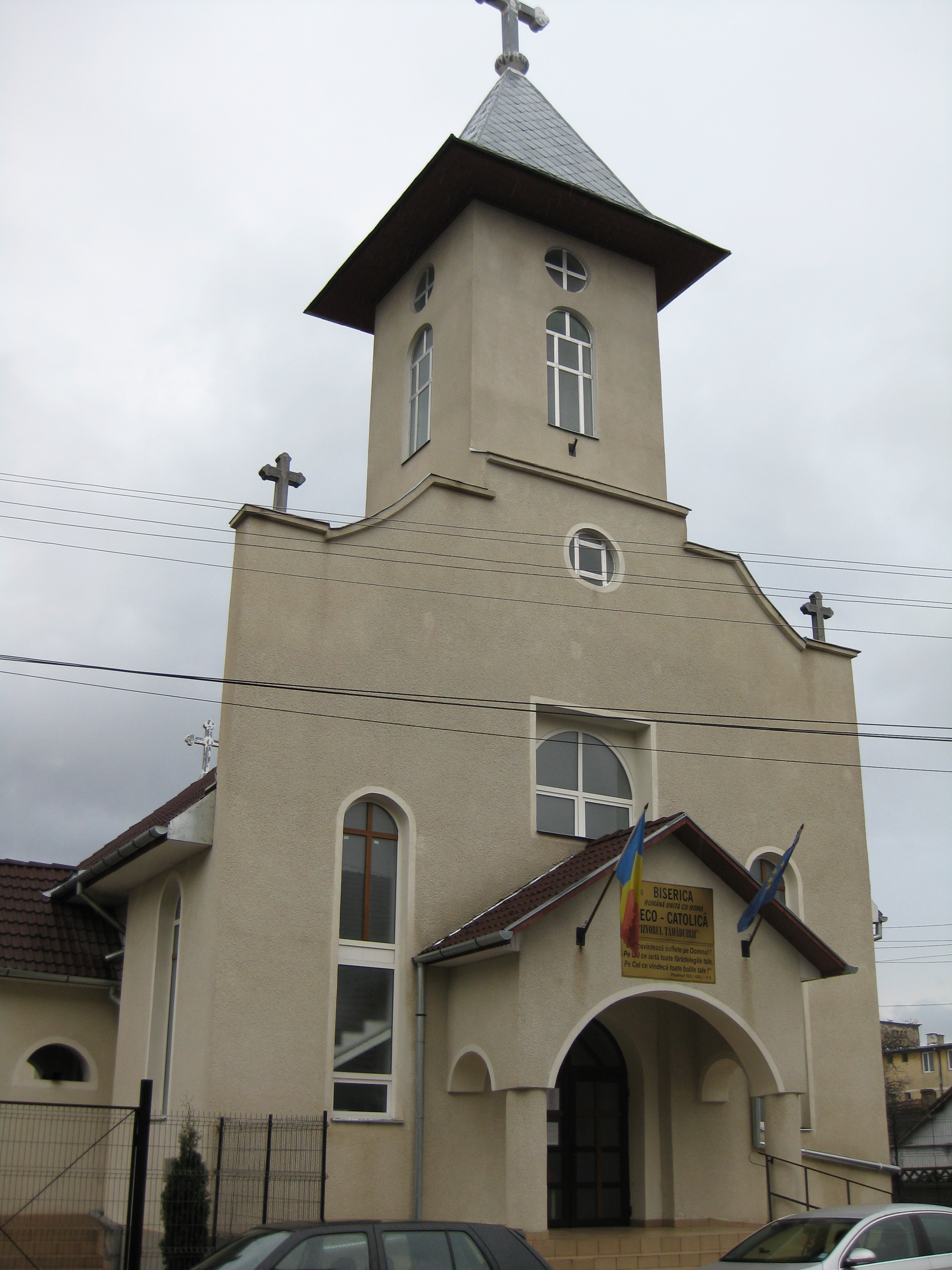
Greek-Catholic church

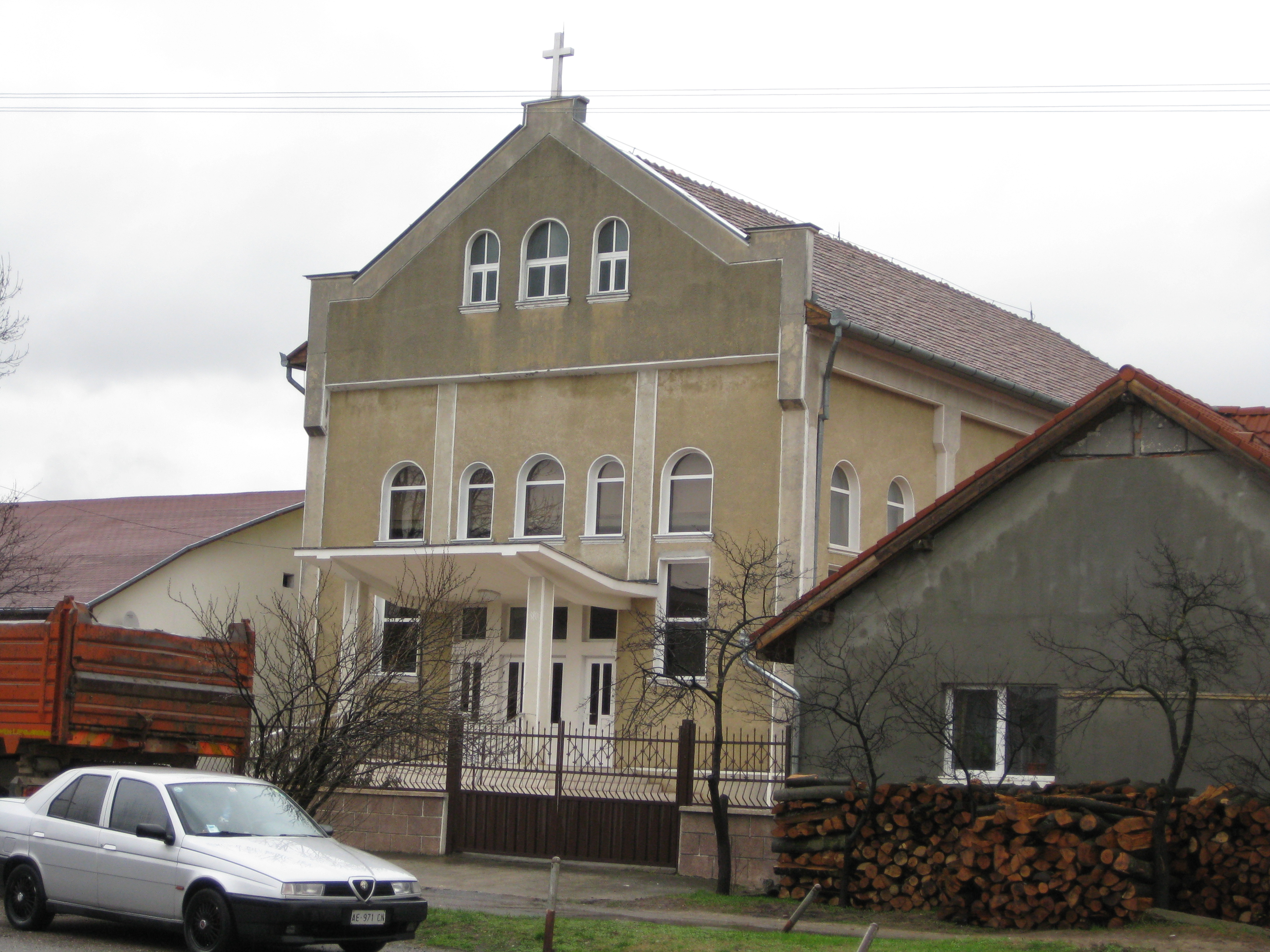
Baptist prayer hall

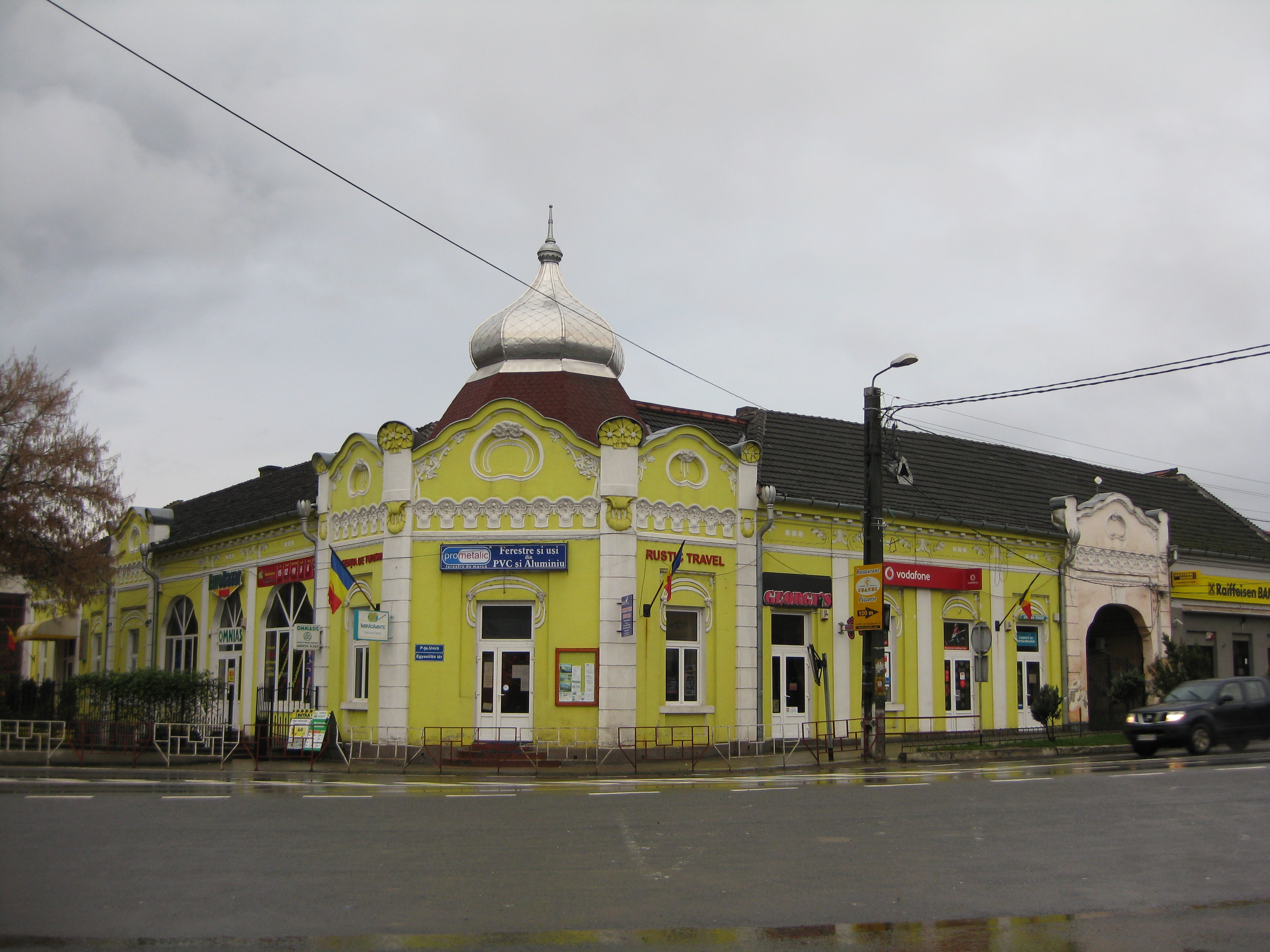
The old Erzsébet Hotel

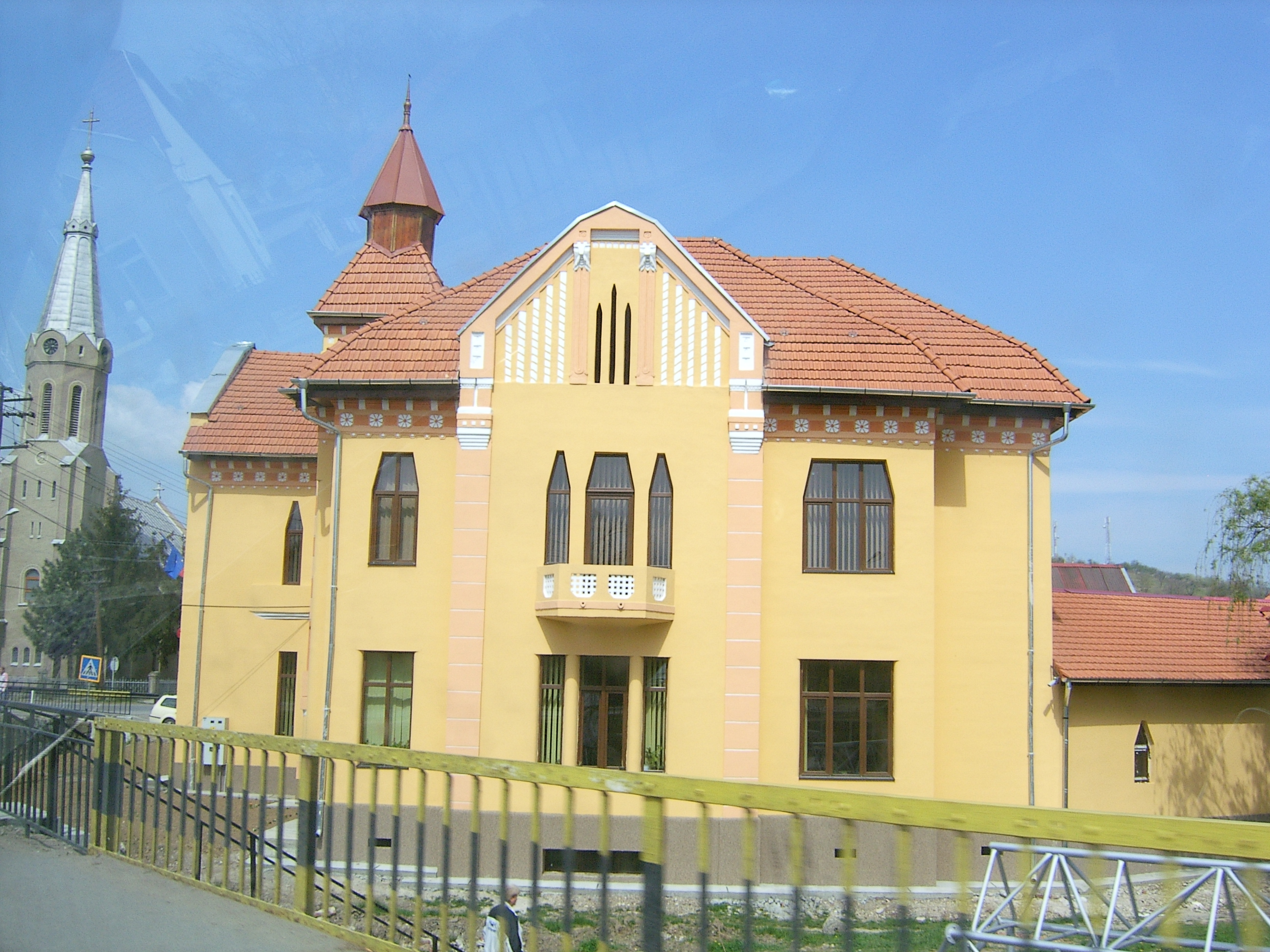
Létai House

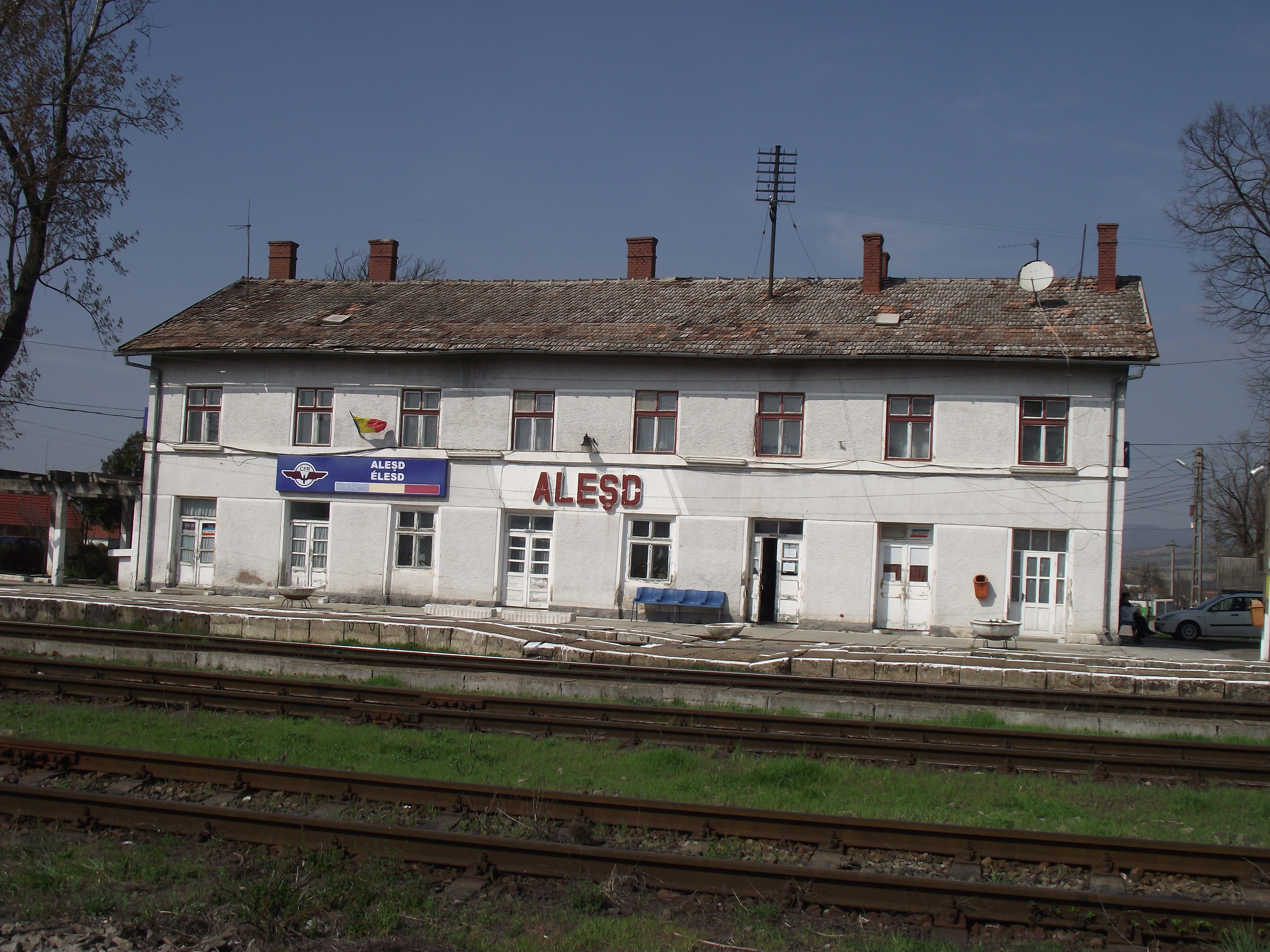
Train station
