= Mărtinești =

- Commune
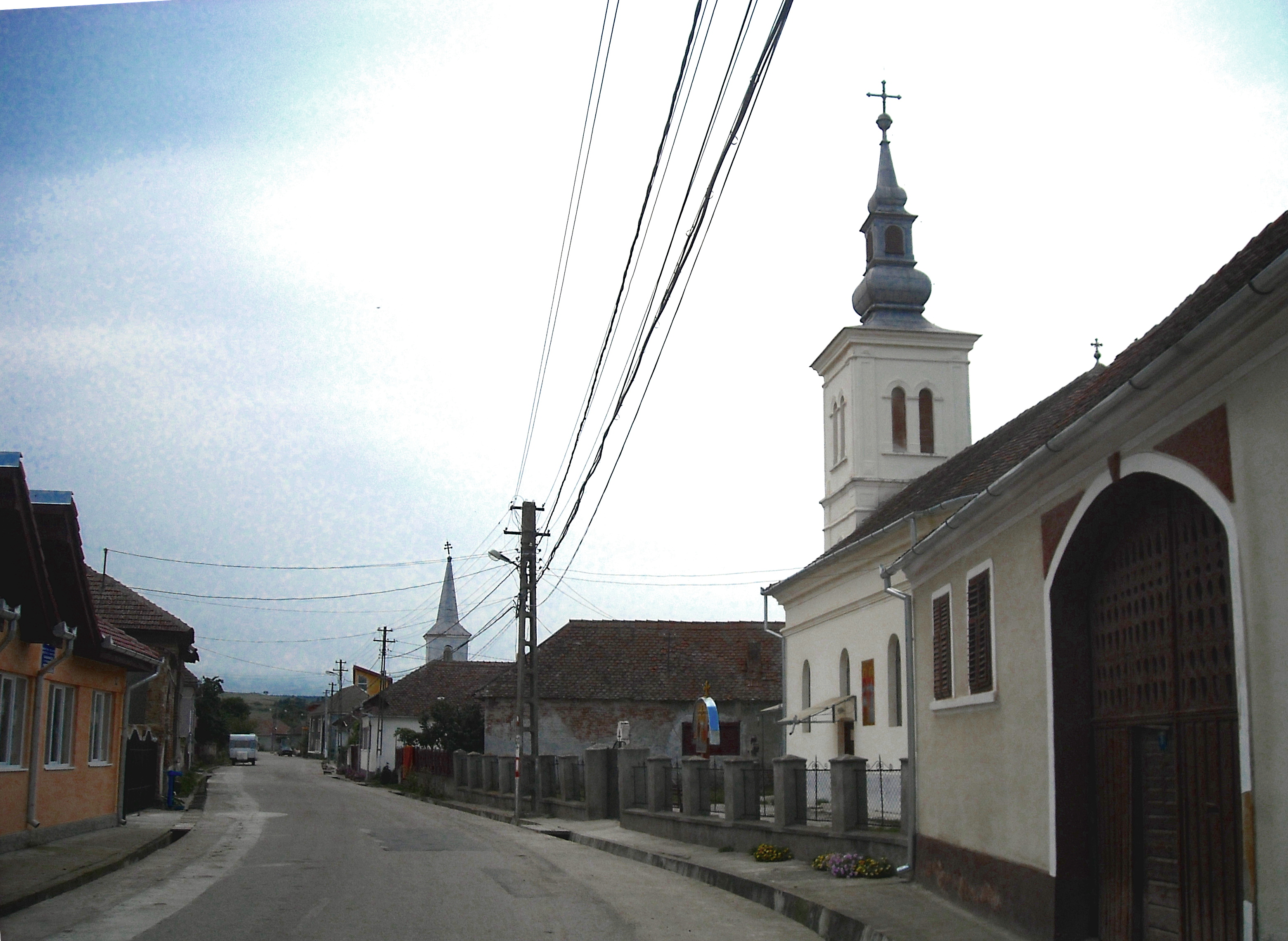
- Mărtinești village

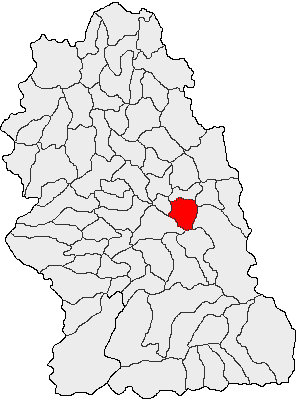
- Location in Hunedoara County

- Location in Romania
- Coordinates: 45.813°N 23.127°E
- Country: Romania
- County: Hunedoara

Government
  - Mayor (2024–2028): Adinel Ioan Botescu (PSD)
- Area: 59.01 km^{2} (22.78 sq mi)
- Elevation: 246 m (807 ft)
- Population (2021-12-01): 939
  - Density: 15.9/km^{2} (41.2/sq mi)
- Time zone: UTC+02:00 (EET)
  - Summer (DST): UTC+03:00 (EEST)
- Postal code: 337315
- Area code: (+40) 02 54
- Vehicle reg.: HD
- Website: www.martinesti.ro

Mărtinești (Hungarian: Martinesd, German: Martensdorf) is a commune in Hunedoara County, Transylvania, Romania. It is composed of seven villages: Dâncu Mare (Nagydenk), Dâncu Mic (Kisdenk), Jeledinți (Lozsád), Măgura (Magura), Mărtinești, Tămășasa (Tamáspatak), and Turmaș (Tormás).

The commune is located in the central part of Hunedoara County, 8 km (5 mi) west of the city of Orăștie and 21 km (13 mi) east of the county seat, Deva. Mărtinești is situated in a hilly area, on the banks of the river Turdaș.

In 2012, four looters were sent to trial for looting from Sarmizegetusa Regia between 1998 and 2009. They looted 3,600 Greek coins (estimated at €3,794,550), a necklace (estimated at €100,000) and 35 Roman denarii from Dâncu Mare village.

Historical population
Year	Pop.	±%
1850	3,744	—
1900	3,377	−9.8%
1930	2,941	−12.9%
1977	1,817	−38.2%
1992	1,223	−32.7%
2002	1,048	−14.3%
2011	956	−8.8%
2021	939	−1.8%
Source: Census data

== Natives ==
- Cornel Nistorescu (born 1948), journalist
