= Torda County =

Coordinates: 46.560833°N 23.783611°E

Torda County (German: Komitat Torda, Hungarian: Torda vármegye, Latin: comitatus Thordensis) was a county in Transylvania from the 11th century and 1876.

== History ==
=== Kingdom of Hungary ===
Counties (districts formed around royal fortresses) were the basic units of royal administration in the Kingdom of Hungary from the 11th century. The fortress initially serving as the seat of Torda County was located at a distance of about 15 kilometres (9.3 mi) from modern Torda (now Turda, Romania), above the village Várfalva (now Moldovenești, Romania), on the river Aranyos (now Arieș in Romania). A cemetery near the castle was used from the turn of the 10th and 11th centuries.

The earliest royal charter mentioning the castle is from 1075, but only its interpolated version has been preserved. The earliest authentic charter referring to the same castle is dated to 1177. Although the county itself was only first mentioned in 1227, a reference in the charter of 1075 to taxes levied on salt at the castle implies the existence of a system of administration. Reference to an unnamed ispán of Torda was preserved in a charter from 1221. The ispáns of Torda were appointed by the voivodes of Transylvania, the representative of the kings of Hungary in the province.

== List of ispáns ==
=== Fourteenth century ===
Term	Incumbent	Voivode of Transylvania	Notes	Source
c. 1310	Domokos, son of Marcell Járai	Ladislaus (III) Kán		
c. 1312	Miklós, son of Péter Gerendi	Ladislaus (III) Kán	first rule	
c. 1326	Miklós, son of Péter Gerendi	Thomas Szécsényi	second rule	
c. 1335	Magister Jakab, son of István	Thomas Szécsényi		
c. 1350	Marót, son of Péter Cine of Olaszi			
c. 1366	János Túri	Denis Lackfi		

== See also ==
- Maros-Torda County
- Torda-Aranyos County
