= Râciu =

- Commune
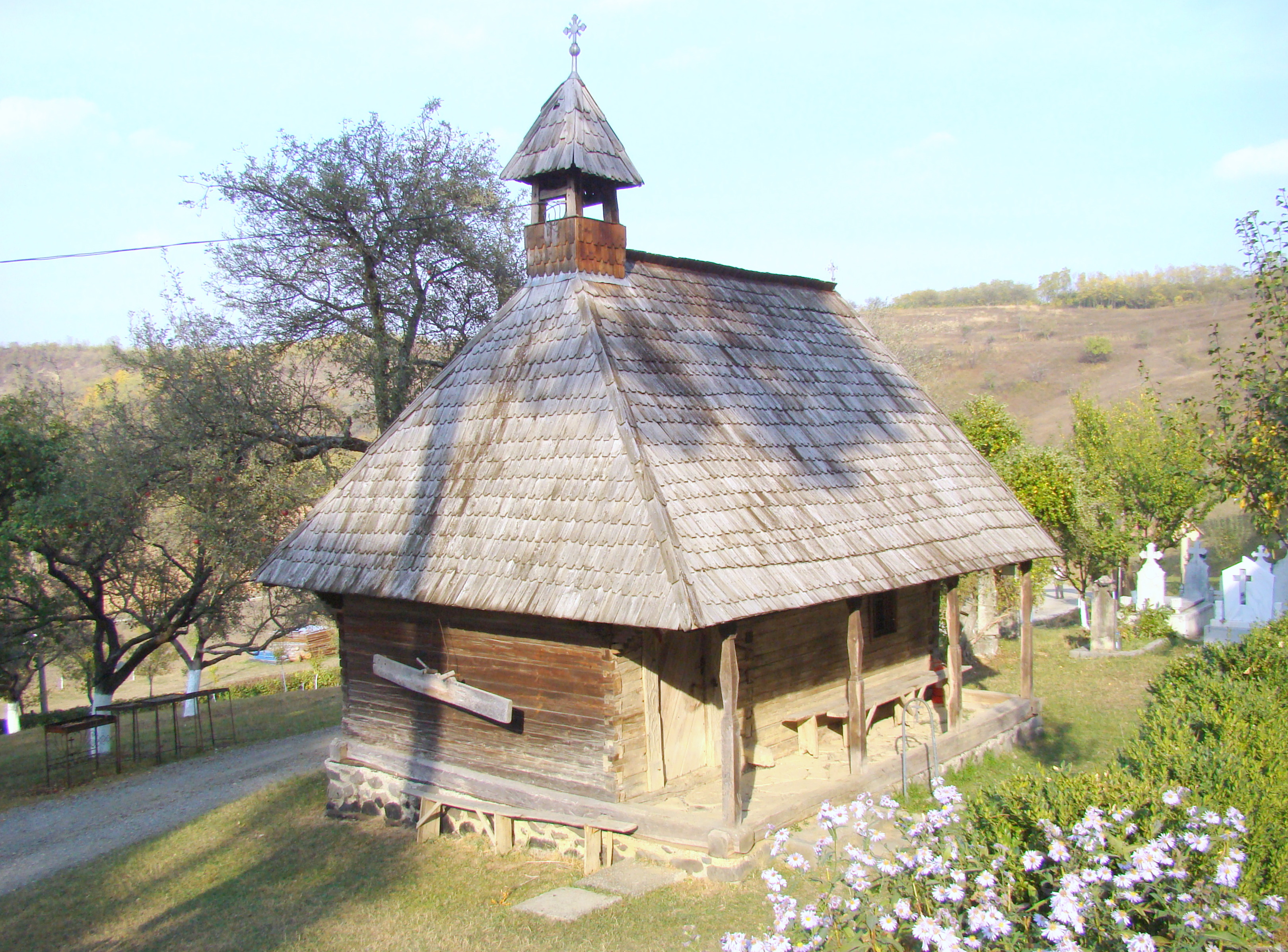
- Wooden church in Sânmărtinu de Câmpie

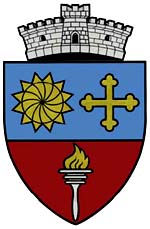
- Coat of arms

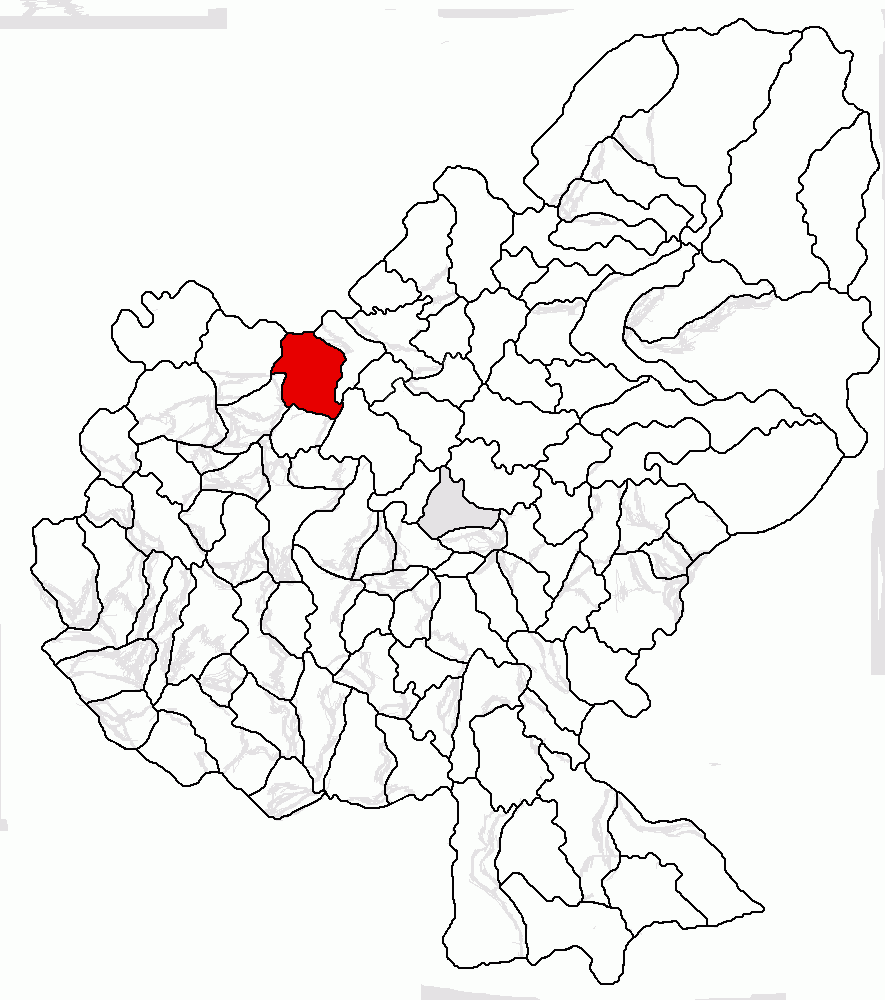
- Location in Mureș County

- Location in Romania
- Coordinates: 46°41′N 24°24′E
- Country: Romania
- County: Mureș

Government
  - Mayor (2020–2024): Alin-Ciprian Belean (PNL)
- Area: 73.95 km^{2} (28.55 sq mi)
- Elevation: 329 m (1,079 ft)
- Population (2021-12-01): 3,289
  - Density: 44.48/km^{2} (115.2/sq mi)
- Time zone: UTC+02:00 (EET)
  - Summer (DST): UTC+03:00 (EEST)
- Postal code: 547485
- Area code: (+40) 02 65
- Vehicle reg.: MS
- Website: www.comunariciu.ro

Râciu (Hungarian: Mezőrücs, Hungarian pronunciation: [ˈmɛzøːrytʃ]) is a commune in Mureș County, Transylvania, Romania composed of fifteen villages: Căciulata, Coasta Mare (Nagyoldal), Cotorinau, Curețe, Hagău (Hágó), Leniș (Lenes), Nima Râciului (Rücsinéma), Obârșie, Pârâu Crucii (Keresztpatak), Râciu, Sânmărtinu de Câmpie (Mezőszentmárton), Ulieș (Nagyölyves), Valea Sânmărtinului (Forrásészka), Valea Seacă (Szárazpatak), and Valea Ulieșului (Ölyvespatak).

== Demographics ==
Historical population
Year	Pop.	±%
1850	2,839	—
1920	3,894	+37.2%
1966	6,442	+65.4%
2002	3,752	−41.8%
2011	3,748	−0.1%
2021	3,289	−12.2%
Source: Census data

At the 2002 census, the town had a population of 3,752, of which 90% were Romanians, 6% Roma, and 4% Hungarians. At the 2011 census, Râciu had a population of 3,748, of which 87.35% were Romanians, 7.55% Roma, and 2.59% Hungarians. At the 2021 census, it had a population of 3,289, of which 79.36% were Romanians, 5.81% Roma, and 1.4% Hungarians.

== See also ==
- List of Hungarian exonyms (Mureș County)
