= Soloneț =

Soloneț may refer to several places in Romania:

- Soloneț, a village in Bivolari Commune, Iași County
- Soloneț, a village in Todirești Commune, Suceava County
- Solonețu Nou, a village in Cacica Commune, Suceava County
- Soloneț (Prut), a tributary of the Prut in Iași County, Romania
- Soloneț (Suceava), a tributary of the Suceava in Suceava County, Romania

and a village in Moldova:

- Soloneț, a village in Stoicani Commune, Soroca district
