= Siret (river) =

River in Ukraine and Romania

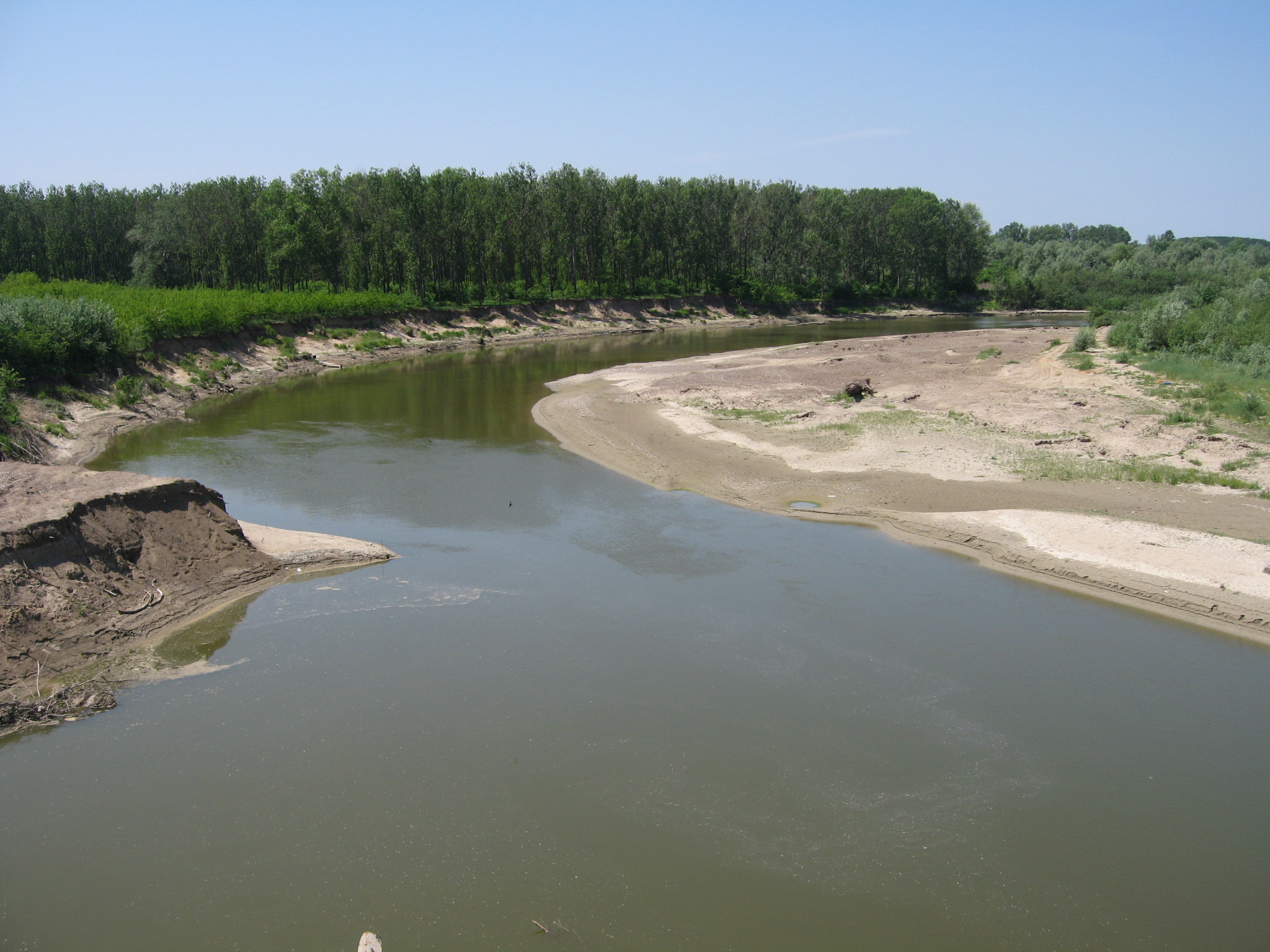
- Siret River at Mircești

Location
- Country: Ukraine; Romania
- Counties/ Oblasts: Chernivtsi; Botoșani; Suceava; Neamț; Iași; Bacău; Vrancea; Galați
- Cities: Pașcani; Roman; Bacău; Galați

Physical characteristics
- Source: Eastern Carpathians
  - location: Chernivtsi O., Ukraine
  - elevation: 1,238 m (4,062 ft)
- Mouth: Danube
  - location: Galați
  - coordinates: 45°24′11″N 28°1′27″E
- Length: 647 km (402 mi)
- Basin size: 44,811 km^{2} (17,302 sq mi)
- Discharge
  - average: 250 m^{3}/s (8,800 cu ft/s)

Basin features
- Progression: Danube→ Black Sea
- Tributaries
  - left: Bârlad
  - right: Suceava, Moldova, Bistrița, Trotuș, Putna, Buzău

The Siret or Sireth (Romanian: Siret, pronounced [siˈret]; Ukrainian: Сірет or Серет; Hungarian: Szeret) is a river that rises from the Carpathians in the Northern Bukovina region of Ukraine, and flows southward into Romania before it joins the Danube. It is 647 km (402 mi) long, of which a 559 km (347 mi) section is in Romania, and its basin area is 44,811 km^{2} (17,302 sq mi), of which 42,890 km^{2} (16,560 sq mi) in Romania. Its average discharge is 250 m^{3}/s (8,800 cu ft/s). In ancient times, it was named Hierasus (Ancient Greek Ιερασός).

== Geography ==
The Siret River hydrographic basin consists mainly of waters brought by the Bistrița (about 26.8%), Trotuș (about 10%), Moldova (about 12.2%), and Suceava (about 12%) rivers.

The river initially flows northward in the region of Northern Bukovina. The section of the river up to its confluence with the Siretul Mic (Malyi Seret) (near Suceveni (Sucheveny) village in the Adâncata district (Hlyboka Raion)) is called the Siretul Mare. The river is called Siret after its confluence with the Siretul Mic.

The river flows through the towns of Berhomet on the Siret and Jadova, where it begins to change its direction of flow to the southeast. It continues its flow through the town of Storojineț and the villages of Ropcea, Camenca, Volcineț, and Cerepcăuți.

The Siret leaves Ukrainian territory and enters Romania in the north-east. Initially forming the border between Suceava and Botoșani counties, it continues in a southeastern direction. It passes through Siret, the former capital of Moldavia (in the second half of the 14th century), and then through Grămești, Zvoriștea, and Liteni. The 170 km-long Suceava River flows into the Siret on the right near Liteni, around 20 km (12 mi) from Suceava.

The Siret continues flowing southward, crossing the towns of Pașcani and Stolniceni-Prăjescu until it reaches Roman, where it joins the waters of the Moldova River. The Bistrița River (290 km) joins it on the right 5 km after it passes the city of Bacău. Further downstream, it passes through the town of Adjud and near Mărășești. Near its confluence with the Danube, it merges with the waters of the Bârlad River (289 km) on its left bank and the waters of the Buzău River (325 km) on its right bank.

Finally, it flows into the Danube near the city of Galați.

== River system development ==
The banks of the Siret River are formed of layers of gravel, sand, and loess. In spring, when the snow melts, and in summer, after heavy rains, the Siret River can cause flooding. While the Siret is normally 70–100 m wide and 0.20–0.70 m deep, during snowmelt or heavy rainfall, its width increases to 200 m and its depth reaches 2–3 m.

Several dams and reservoirs have been built along its course, reducing the risk of flooding.

The Siret River is not navigable due to its shallow depth; only small ships can navigate the section after its confluence with the Bârlad River.

== Towns and villages ==
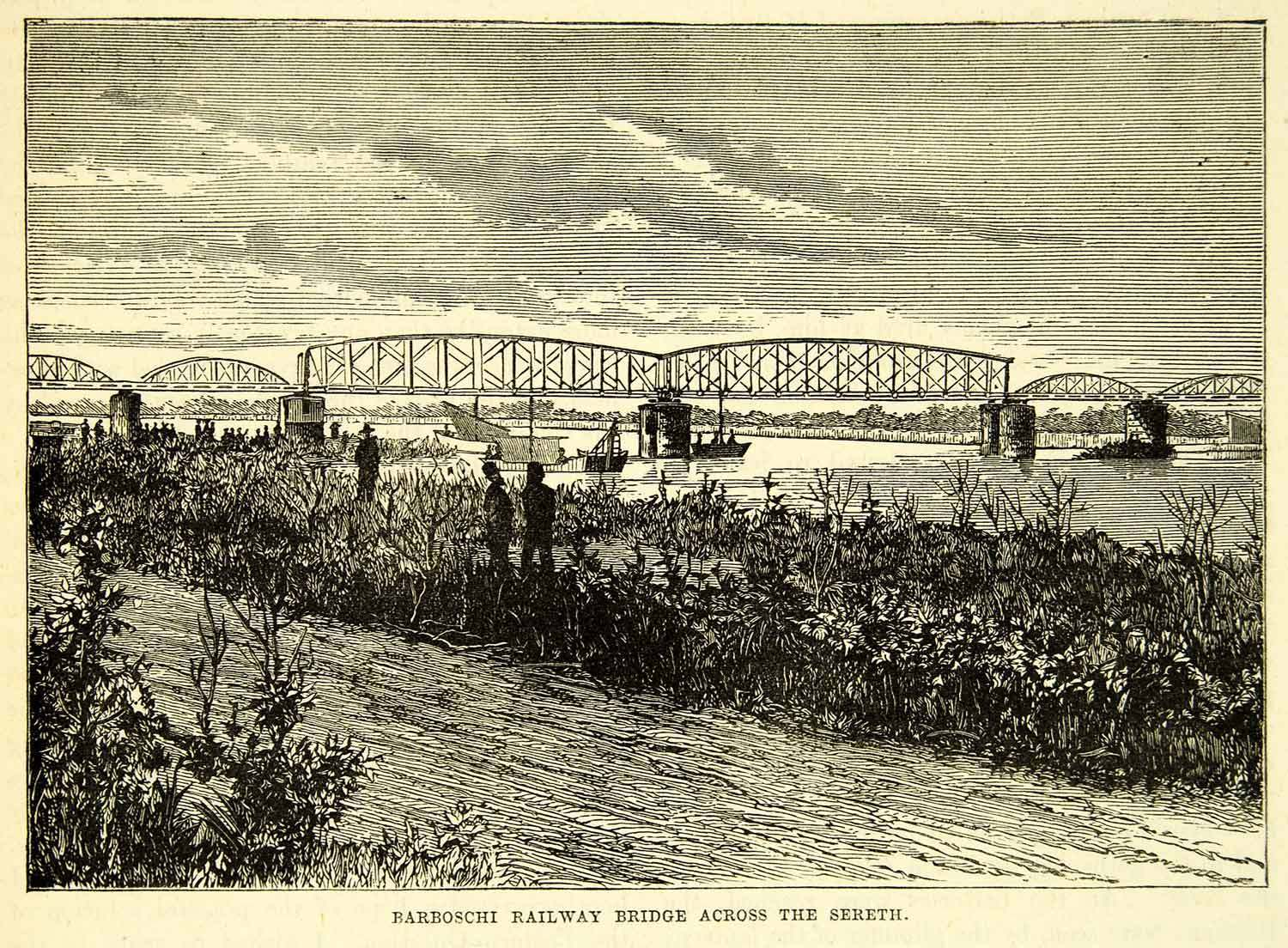
The former Barboși Railway Bridge, from an 1870s wood engraving

The following towns and villages are situated along the river Siret, from source to mouth: Berehomet, Storozhynets, Siret, Grămești, Zvoriștea, Liteni, Dolhasca, Pașcani, Stolniceni-Prăjescu, Roman, Bacău, Adjud, Mărășești, and Galați.

== Tributaries ==
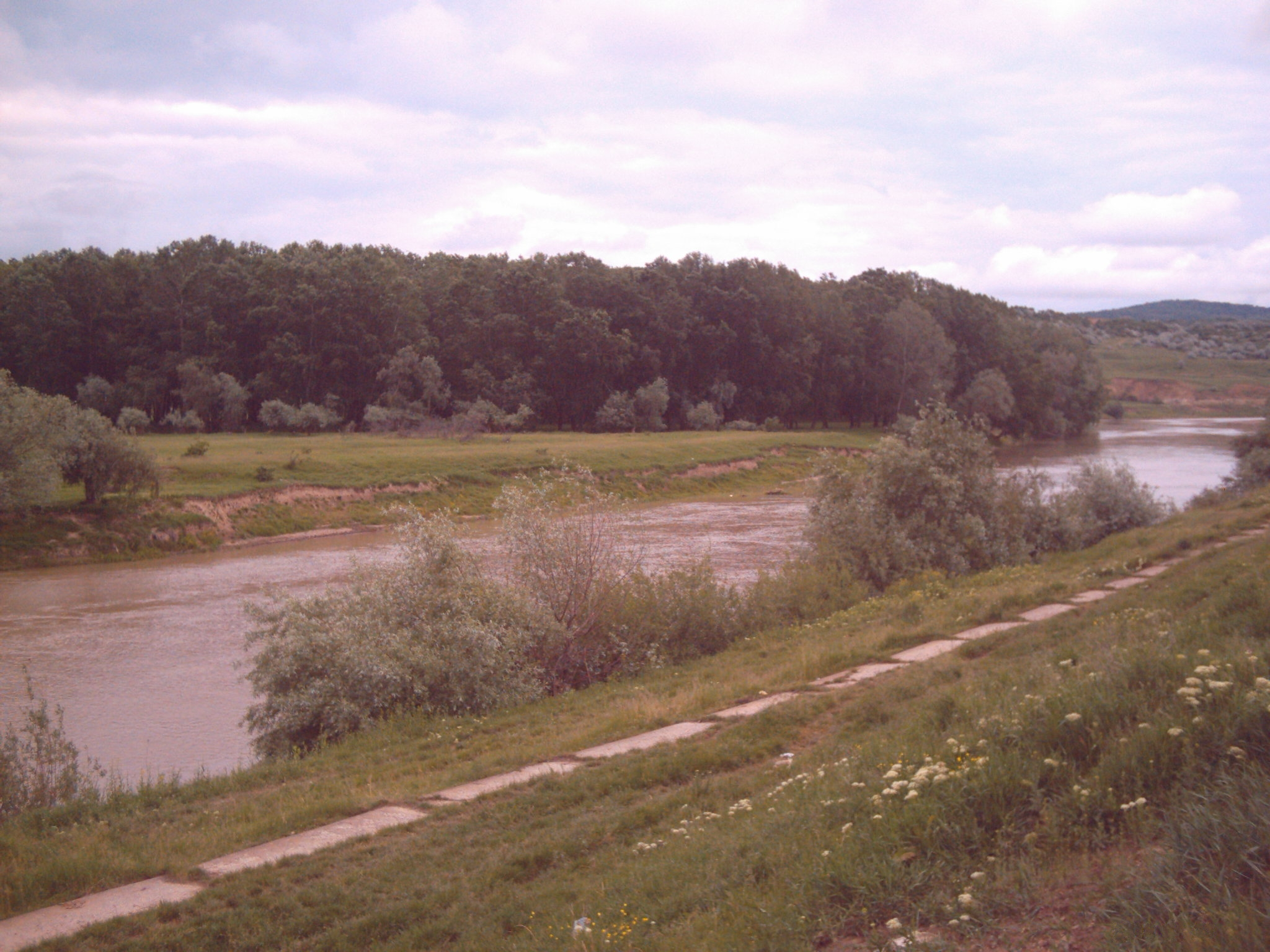
Siret river, Roman

The following rivers are tributaries to the river Siret (from source to mouth):

Left: Bahna (Mihăileni), Molnița, Bahna (Lozna), Gârla Sirețel, Gârla Huțanilor, Vorona, Pleșul, Turbata, Pietrosul, Sirețel, Stolniceni, Hărmănești, Pârâul Țigăncilor, Mihăili, Boca, Albuia, Rediu, Vulpășești, Pârâul Pietros, Țiganca, Icușești, Glodeni, Râpaș, Moara, Bogdănești, Valea Morii, Ulm, Racova, Tamași, Răcătău, Soci, Fulgeriș, Rogoza, Polocin, Lupa, Bârlad, Călmățui, Geru, Bârlădel, Rusca, Mălina, and Cătușa.

Right: Malyi Seret, Găvan, Negostina, Pârâul Mare, Verehia, Baranca, Leahu, Stâncuța, Hănțești, Grigorești, Sălăgeni, Suceava, Șomuzul Mic, Șomuzul Mare, Pârâul lui Pulpa, Trestioara, Conțeasca, Ruja, Sodomeni, Valea Părului, Podul Turcului (Draga), Moldova, Valea Neagră, Turbata, Precista, Bistrița, Bahna, Valea Mare, Cleja (or Tocila), Răcăciuni, Drăgușeni, Scurta, Bolohan, Fântânele, Conțești, Trotuș, Valea Boului, Carecna, Câmpul, Zăbrăuț, Șușița, Gârla Morilor, Putna Seacă, Putna, Leica, Râmnicul Sărat, and Buzău.

== 2010 floodings ==
During July 2010, Gheorghe Flutur, president of the county council of Suceava, told the Mediafax news agency his region was one of the worst hit in the country on the morning of the 29th, as he coordinated local flood relief work in his stricken county. Later that day, the Siret river threatened to break through the dykes protecting the town of Șendreni, as locals and emergency services reinforced the dykes with truckloads of sandbags to prevent the river breaking out and flooding the town.

== See also ==
- Global storm activity of 2010
- 2010 Romanian floods
