= Hotari =

- Location within Romania

Location
- Country: Romania
- Counties: Suceava County
- Villages: Botoșana, Comănești

Physical characteristics
- Mouth: Soloneț
  - coordinates: 47.6613°N 26.0056°E
- Length: 10 km (6.2 mi)
- Basin size: 24 km^{2} (9.3 sq mi)

Basin features
- Progression: Soloneț→ Suceava→ Siret→ Danube→ Black Sea

The Hotari is a left tributary of the river Soloneț in Romania. It flows into the Soloneț near Humoreni. Its length is 10 km (6.2 mi) and its basin size is 24 km^{2} (9.3 sq mi).
