= Botoșanița =

Botoșanița may refer to one of two villages in Suceava County, Romania:

- Botoșanița Mare, a village in Calafindești Commune
- Botoșanița Mică, a village in Grămești Commune

== See also ==
- Botoșana River
- Botoșani, name of a city and a county in Romania
