= List of mayors of Brașov =

Mayor of Brașov
- Romanian: Primarul municipiului Brașov
- Coat of arms of Brașov
- Incumbent; George Scripcaru since October 2024
- Term length: 4 years
- Formation: 14th century
- Salary: 4,003 lei
- Website: http://www.brasovcity.ro/

The following is a list of the people (only men, as of 2014) who have fulfilled the role of mayor or its temporal equivalent in the Transylvanian city of Brașov in Romania. Entries followed by a cross sign (†) mean that the respective person deceased while in office.

== Beginnings to the 19th century ==
Since the Saxon settlement in Transylvania carried out by Hungarian king Géza II in the late 12th and early 13th centuries, their records have been a very important source of information (such as the following) about affairs in the region at the time, that would otherwise have been lost. The following section presents, in chronological order, the people that have held the title of "judge" ("judex civitatis" in Latin; head of the city administration's main structure, the Magistrate) since the earliest of these records (but almost a century and a half after the colonization), up to the 19th century, time during which the administration has hardly changed.

=== Judges ===
- Nicolaus filius Pauli olim iudex, prior to 1360
- Jacobus iudex, 1364, 1368, 1380, 1387
- Johannes Sydenswancz, 1397–1398, 1403–1406, 1412
- Valentinus Godfridi iudex, 1413, 1415, 1419
- Nicolaus Wyroch, 1420
- Valentinus Godfridi iudex, 1424
- Simon Revdel, 1425
- Valentinus Godfridi iudex, 1427
- Georgius dictus Burger, 1435
- Petrus Anthonii iudex, 1439–1440
- Georgius iudex, 1444
- Petrus comes, alias iudex, prior to 1447
- Caspar Craus, alias iudex, prior to 1455
- Georgius, condam iudex, prior to 1456
- Georg Lang, iudex, 1462
- Laurentius Pereczswthew, 1467
- Petrus Revel, iudex, 1475
- Petrus Werek, 1483
- Petrus Kewel, 1484
- Symon Sartor, 1488
- Bartholomeus Schunkabunk, 1494
- Simon Sartor, 1497
- Petrus Beer (Vrsinus), 1499–1500
- Georgius Ewthwes, 1502
- Johannes Schirmer, 1506–1507
- Matthias Funifex (Zeler), 1509–1510
- Johannes Benkner, 1511–1513
- Johannes Schirmer, 1514
- Johannes Benkner, 1515, 1517–1518
- Hanns Balwes, 1519
- Johannes Benkner, 1520–1521
- Hans Schirmer, Richter, 1522
- Johannes Benkner, 1523
- Valentinus Cheres, 1524
- Clemens Weyrauch, 1525–1526
- Peter Engel, 1527
- Lucas Hirscher, 1528–1539
- Martinus Drauth, 1540
- Lucas Hirscher, până la 19.04.1541
- Johannes Fuchs, 1541–1544
- Vincentius Schneider, 1545–1546
- Johannes Benkner, 1547–1548
- Vincentius Schneider, 1549 2
- Johannes Benkner, 1550–1552
- Simon Goldschmidt, 1553
- Michael Roth, 1554
- Johannes Benkner, 1555–1560
- Lukas Hirscher, 1561–1562
- Simon Goldschmidt, 1563
- Lukas Hirscher, 1564
- Johannes Benkner, 1565
- Simon Goldschmidt, 1566
- Lukas Hirscher, 1567–1568
- Johann Graeff, 1569–1570
- Lukas Hirscher, 1571–1589
- Cyrillus Greißing, 1590
- Johannes Fuchs, 1590–1591
- Cyrillus Greißing, 1592–1594
- Johann Chrestels, 1595
- Cyrillus Greißing, 1595
- Valentin Hirscher, 1596–1604
- Johannes Draudt, 1605–1607
- Matthias Fronius, 1608–1609
- Johannes Draudt, 1609–1611
- Michael Weiß, 1612
- Johannes Draudt, 1613
- Johannes Greißing, 1614
- Johann Chrestels, 1615–1619
- Johannes Draudt, 1620
- Johann Chrestels, 1621–1624
- Daniel Fronius, 1625–1627
- Christianus Hirscher, 1628–1629
- Michael Goldschmidt, 1630–1632
- Christianus Hirscher, 1635
- Michael Goldschmidt, 1639
- Christianus Hirscher, 1641
- Michael Herrmann, 1647, 1654–1655
- Michael Goldschmidt, 1657–1658
- Michael Herrmann, 1659–28.08.1660 (†)
- Joseph Bolthosch, 1661
- David Czako, 1662–1663
- Simon Drauth, 1664
- David Czako, 1665
- Georgius Chrestels, 1666–1667
- David Czako, 1668
- Georgius Chrestels, 1669
- David Czako, 1670–1672
- Simon Dietrich, 1673–1674
- David Czako, 1675–1676
- Simon Dietrich, 1677–1679
- Georgius Drauth, 1680–1685
- Michael Filstich, 1686–1688 3
- Simon Draudt, 1689–1690
- Michael Filstich, 1691
- Simon Drauth, 1692
- Michael Filstich, 1693
- Johannes Mankesch, 1694–24.11.1699 (†)
- Georgius Jeckel, 1700
- Andreas Rheter, 1701–19.01.1707 (†)
- Georgius Jeckel, până la 28.08.1708 (†)
- Bartholomeus Seuler, 1709–1710
- Georgius Drauth, 1711–1714
- Stephan Filstich, 1715–1717
- Georgius Drauth, 1718–1719
- Stephan Filstich, 1720
- Georgius Drauth, 1721
- Stephan Filstich, 1722–1723
- Georgius Drauth, 1724–1727
- Stephan Filstich, 1728–1732
- Lucas Seuler M.D., 1733
- Stephanus Filstich, 1734–1736
- Samuel Herberth, 1737–1740
- Paulus Chrestels, 1741–1742
- Samuel Herberth, 1743–1744
- Paulus Chrestels, până la 26.12.1745 (†)
- Samuel Herberth de Herbertsheim, 1746–1747
- Martinus Closius, 1748–29.09.1749 (†)
- Christoph von Seewaldt, 1751–1754
- Johann Seuler von Seulen, 1755–1757
- Andreas Tartler, 1758–1769
- Joseph Traugott de Schobeln, 1770–1777
- Michael Enyeter, 8.10.1778–26.09.1781
- Joseph Traugott de Schobeln, 27.09.1781–9.08.1783 (†)
- Michael Fronius, 21.08.1783–18.04.1786
- Joseph August Drauth, 1.06.1786–1789
- Johann Theophil Wentzel, 27.05.1789–1790
- Michael Traugott Fronius, 23.04.1790–28.06.1799 (†)
- Georg Franz Clompe, 29.07.1799–31.10.1822

== Mid-19th century to World War I ==
=== Superior judges ===
- Johann Jakob Mylius, 1.11.1822–21.05.1832 (†)
- Johann Georg de Trauschenfels, 21.05.1832–24.08.1841 (†)
- Joseph Wentzel, 25.10.1841–1846
- Johann Georg von Albrichsfeld, 10.12.1846–6.12.1854

=== Mayors ===
- Franz von Schobeln, 6.12.1854–3.03.1859
- Friedrich Fabritius, 3.03.1859–23.04.1861

=== Superior judges of the city and of the district ===
- Friedrich Fabritius, 23.04.1861–1868
- Georg Dück, 1.02.1869–31.12.1871
- Karl Schnell, 1.01.1872–18.12.1876 (retired)

=== Mayors ===
- Johann Gött, 26.10.1876–1.12.1879 (retired)
- Franz Brenner von Brennerberg, 19.11.1879–28.05.1896 (retired)
- Karl Jacobi, 15.06.1896–20.07.1898 (retired)
- Franz Hiemesch, 1.10.1898–4.04.1911 (†)
- dr. Karl Ernst Schnell 10.07.1911–28.08.1916
- dr. Gheorghe Baiulescu, 29.08.1916–08.10.1916
- dr. Karl Ernst Schnell, 9.10.1916–1926*

== Early 20th century ==
Following World War I, Brașov, along with entire Transylvania, became part of the enlarged Kingdom of Romania.

=== Delegate mayors ===
- Dr. Carol Schnell (delegate mayor), 1918–1926
- Emil Socaciu (delegate mayor), 1926

=== Mayors ===
- Dr. Constantin Moga, 1926–1928; start of local administration in the Romanian language
- Dr. Carol Schnell (mayor's endorser), 1928 (1.09–16.10)
- Dr. Sterie Stinghe, 1928–1929
- Gheorghe Cuteanu, 1929–1931

=== Presidents of the interimary committee ===
- Iuliu Suciu, 1931–22.06.1932
- Dr. Ioan Garoiu, 22.06.1932–15.10.1932
- Dr. Cornel Voicu (mayor), 1932–21.03.1934
- Dr. Filimon Bogdan, 21.03.1934–31.08.1934
- C. Dumitrescu Pârvu, 31.08.1934–24.05.1935
- Dr. Tarquiniu Priscu, 1935–1938
- Dr. Ioan Latciu (delegate mayor), 6.01.1938–11.02.1938
- Dr. Virgil Voicu (delegate mayor), 13.02.1938–17.02.1938

== World War II and communist rule ==
=== Military delegates ===
- Lt. Col. Victor Nanu, 18.02.1938–1940

Pending Victor Nanu, other military personnel have taken up the role of mayor until the end of the war.

=== Mayors of the communist regime ===
- Cucu Alexandru, 1945–1948;
- Tasedeanu Stefan, 1948–1949;
- Jiga Vasile, 1949–1950;
- Bujoreanu Florea, 1950–1952;
- Goga, 1952–1954;
- Cadar Alexandru, 1954–1955;
- Halga Sabin, 1955–1956;
- Cadar Alexandru, 1956–1958;
- Caraba Vicentiu, 1958–1960;
- Moldovan Pavel, 1960–1961;
- Dumitrescu Gheorghe, 1961–1967;
- Huluban Nicolae, 1967–1968;
- Cârtîna Constantin, 1968–1971;
- Sutu Gheorghe, 1971–1974;
- Dumitrache Gheorghe, 1974–1977;
- Draghici Ioan, 1977–1984;
- Calancea Dumitru, 1984–1987;
- Cioboiu Adrian, 1987–1989.

== Recent years ==
=== Post-communist delegate mayors ===
- Sălăjan Cornel, 1990;
- Costin Marius, 1990–1991;
- Chiosa Vasile, 1991;
- Gonţea Ion, 1991–februarie 1992.

=== Mayors ===
Starting in 1992, mayors of the city as well as local counsellors are publicly elected every 4 years.

- Adrian Moruzi, 1992–1996;
- Ioan Ghişe, 1996–2004;
- George Scripcaru, 2004–2020;
- Allen Coliban, 2020–2024;
- George Scripcaru, 2024–present.
