= Buruienești =

Buruieneşti may refer to several villages in Romania:

- Buruieneşti, a village in Bivolari Commune, Iaşi County
- Buruieneşti, a village in Doljești Commune, Neamţ County
