= Albuia =

- Location within Romania

Location
- Country: Romania
- Counties: Iași, Neamț
- Villages: Căușeni, Bâra, Rotunda

Physical characteristics
- Mouth: Siret
  - location: Rotunda
  - coordinates: 47.0118°N 26.9696°E
- Length: 22 km (14 mi)
- Basin size: 126 km^{2} (49 sq mi)

Basin features
- Progression: Siret→ Danube→ Black Sea
- Tributaries
  - right: Pârâul Mare, Aninoasa
- River code: XII.1.37

The Albuia is a left tributary of the river Siret in Romania. It flows into the Siret in Rotunda. The basin size of the 22 km (14 mi) long Albuia is 126 km^{2} (49 sq mi).
