= Soloneț (Suceava) =

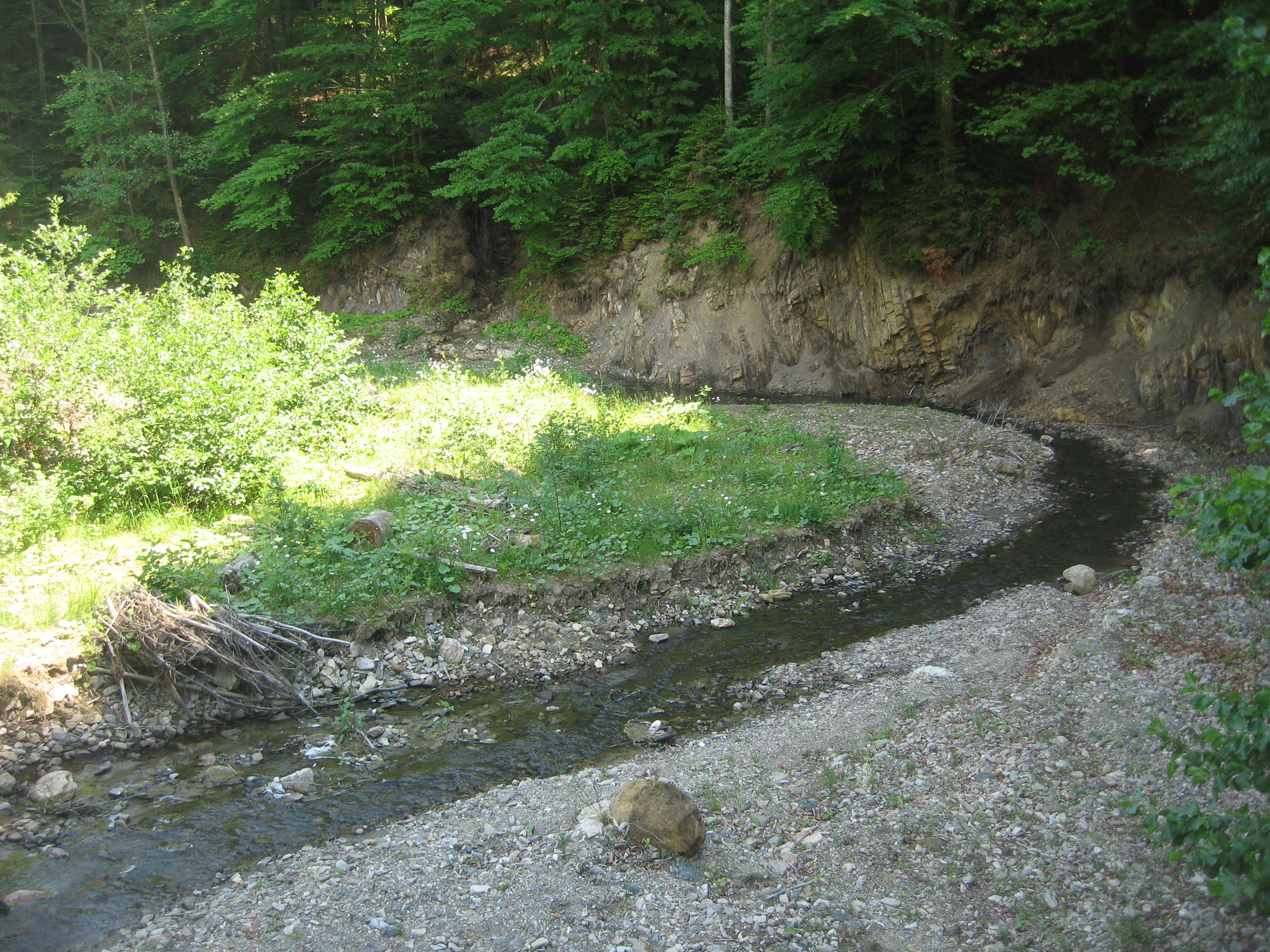

- Location within Romania

Location
- Country: Romania
- Counties: Suceava County

Physical characteristics
- Mouth: Suceava
  - location: Părhăuți
  - coordinates: 47.7112°N 26.1122°E
- Length: 38 km (24 mi)
- Basin size: 206 km^{2} (80 sq mi)

Basin features
- Progression: Suceava→ Siret→ Danube→ Black Sea
- Tributaries
  - left: Hinata, Hotari, Cajvana
  - right: Blândeț, Varvata

The Soloneț is a right tributary of the river Suceava in Romania. It discharges into the Suceava in Părhăuți. It flows through the villages Solonețu Nou, Pârteștii de Sus, Pârteștii de Jos, Humoreni, Comănești, Soloneț, Todirești and Părhăuți. Its length is 38 km (24 mi) and its basin size is 206 km^{2} (80 sq mi).
