= 2022 World Mixed Doubles Qualification Event =

- Host city: Dumfries, Scotland
- Arena: Dumfries Ice Bowl
- Dates: December 2–7
- Qualifiers: Austria; Spain; Netherlands; Turkey

The 2022 World Mixed Doubles Qualification Event was held from December 2 to 7 at the Dumfries Ice Bowl in Dumfries, Scotland. The top four placing teams (Austria, Spain, Netherlands, Turkey) qualified for the 2023 World Mixed Doubles Curling Championship in Gangneung, South Korea.

== Teams ==
The teams are as follows:

Austria	China	Chinese Taipei	Croatia
Female: Hannah Augustin; Male: Martin Reichel	Female: Su Tingyu; Male: Li Menghua	Female: Amanda Chou; Male: Brendon Liu	Female: Petra Beštak; Male: Nevan Pufnik
Finland	France	Guyana	Hong Kong
Female: Lotta Immonen; Male: Markus Sipilä	Female: Kseniya Shevchiuk; Male: Eddy Mercier	Female: Farzana Hussain; Male: Rayad Husain	Female: Ling-Yue Hung; Male: Jason Chang
India	Ireland	Kazakhstan	Latvia
Female: Richa Patel; Male: P. N. Raju	Female: Alison Fyfe; Male: John Wilson	Female: Yekaterina Kolykhalova; Male: Adil Zhumagozha	Female: Daina Barone; Male: Arnis Veidemanis
Lithuania	Mexico	Netherlands	New Zealand
Female: Mintautė Jurkutė; Male: Paulius Rymeikis	Female: Angélica Pérez Anzures; Male: Ramy Cohen	Female: Lisenka Bomas; Male: Wouter Gösgens	Female: Courtney Smith; Male: Anton Hood
Nigeria	Poland	Portugal	Romania
Female: Susana Cole; Male: Tijani Cole	Female: Adela Walczak; Male: Andrzej Augustyniak	Female: April Gale Seixeiro; Male: Steve Seixeiro	Female: Iulia Trăilă; Male: Allen Coliban
Slovakia	Slovenia	Spain	Turkey
Female: Slávka Makovníková; Male: František Pitoňák	Female: Lea Jere; Male: Gaber Bor Zelinka	Female: Oihane Otaegi; Male: Mikel Unanue	Female: Dilşat Yıldız; Male: Bilal Ömer Çakır
Ukraine	Wales		
Female: Anastasiia Kotova; Male: Eduard Nikolov	Female: Laura Beever; Male: Garry Coombs		

== Round-robin standings ==
Final round-robin standings

Key
Teams to Playoffs

Group A	W	L	W–L	DSC
China	6	0	–	72.50
France	5	1	–	63.69
Chinese Taipei	3	3	1–0	90.74
Lithuania	3	3	0–1	70.19
Wales	2	4	1–0	91.16
Portugal	2	4	0–1	86.46
India	0	6	–	86.97

Group B	W	L	W–L	DSC
New Zealand	6	0	–	57.22
Netherlands	5	1	–	35.51
Latvia	4	2	–	65.23
Poland	3	3	–	71.83
Ireland	2	4	–	69.13
Mexico	1	5	–	82.91
Romania	0	6	–	66.14

Group C	W	L	W–L	DSC
Finland	5	0	–	75.96
Austria	4	1	–	58.31
Kazakhstan	3	2	–	69.07
Slovenia	2	3	–	84.39
Guyana	1	4	–	79.86
Nigeria	0	5	–	116.79

Group D	W	L	W–L	DSC
Spain	5	0	–	39.19
Turkey	4	1	–	69.38
Hong Kong	3	2	–	96.42
Ukraine	2	3	–	61.28
Slovakia	1	4	–	106.01
Croatia	0	5	–	180.84

Group A Round Robin Summary Table
Pos.	Country	China	Chinese Taipei	France	India	Lithuania	Portugal	Wales	Record
1	China	—	10–4	8–6	12–2	13–3	7–5	4–3	6–0
3	Chinese Taipei	4–10	—	5–8	9–5	6–5	7–9	7–6	3–3
2	France	6–8	8–5	—	11–1	6–4	5–3	8–7	5–1
7	India	2–12	5–9	1–11	—	2–7	4–8	5–7	0–6
4	Lithuania	3–13	5–6	4–6	7–2	—	11–3	8–5	3–3
6	Portugal	5–7	9–7	3–5	8–4	3–11	—	2–6	2–4
5	Wales	3–4	6–7	7–8	7–5	5–8	6–2	—	2–4

Group B Round Robin Summary Table
Pos.	Country		Latvia	Mexico	Netherlands	New Zealand	Poland	Romania	Record
5	Ireland	—	4–6	13–3	2–9	7–8	5–6	8–7	2–4
3	Latvia	6–4	—	8–6	3–8	4–7	7–3	11–3	4–2
6	Mexico	3–13	6–8	—	2–12	1–7	2–15	12–6	1–5
2	Netherlands	9–2	8–3	12–2	—	4–8	9–5	8–6	5–1
1	New Zealand	8–7	7–4	7–1	8–4	—	8–3	11–2	6–0
4	Poland	6–5	3–7	15–2	5–9	3–8	—	11–0	3–3
7	Romania	7–8	3–11	6–12	6–8	2–11	0–11	—	0–6

Group C Round Robin Summary Table
Pos.	Country	Austria	Finland	Guyana	Kazakhstan	Nigeria	Slovenia	Record
2	Austria	—	3–13	8–2	9–1	11–2	7–2	4–1
1	Finland	13–3	—	9–0	10–7	7–2	13–0	5–0
5	Guyana	2–8	0–9	—	2–7	13–9	6–12	1–4
3	Kazakhstan	1–9	7–10	7–2	—	10–4	8–6	3–2
6	Nigeria	2–11	2–7	9–13	4–10	—	6–11	0–5
4	Slovenia	2–7	0–13	12–6	6–8	11–6	—	2–3

Group D Round Robin Summary Table
Pos.	Country	Croatia	Hong Kong	Slovakia	Spain	Turkey	Ukraine	Record
6	Croatia	—	3–12	1–12	L–W	0–14	2–17	0–5
3	Hong Kong	12–3	—	6–3	3–10	4–11	7–6	3–2
5	Slovakia	12–1	3–6	—	2–10	5–9	5–7	1–4
1	Spain	W–L	10–3	10–2	—	9–5	11–3	5–0
2	Turkey	14–0	11–4	9–5	5–9	—	8–4	4–1
4	Ukraine	17–2	6–7	7–5	3–11	4–8	—	2–3

== Round-robin results ==
All draw times are listed in Greenwich Mean Time (UTC+00:00).

=== Draw 1 ===
Friday, December 2, 17:15

Sheet A	1	2	3	4	5	6	7	8	Final
Hong Kong	0	0	1	0	2	1	1	1	6
Slovakia 🔨	1	1	0	1	0	0	0	0	3

Sheet C	1	2	3	4	5	6	7	8	Final
Austria	0	0	3	0	0	0	X	X	3
Finland 🔨	5	2	0	3	2	1	X	X	13

Sheet B	1	2	3	4	5	6	7	8	Final
Guyana 🔨	0	0	1	0	0	0	1	X	2
Kazakhstan	2	1	0	1	1	2	0	X	7

Sheet F	Final
Croatia	L^
Spain 🔨	W

^A player on Croatia was injured in the first end, and therefore forfeited the match.

=== Draw 2 ===
Friday, December 2, 20:30

Sheet A	1	2	3	4	5	6	7	8	Final
China 🔨	4	0	2	0	3	3	X	X	12
India	0	1	0	1	0	0	X	X	2

Sheet C	1	2	3	4	5	6	7	8	Final
Portugal 🔨	1	0	0	0	1	0	0	X	2
Wales	0	1	1	1	0	2	1	X	6

Sheet E	1	2	3	4	5	6	7	8	Final
Lithuania	0	2	0	2	0	0	0	1	5
Chinese Taipei 🔨	1	0	1	0	2	1	1	0	6

Sheet B	1	2	3	4	5	6	7	8	Final
New Zealand	0	3	1	0	1	1	2	0	8
Ireland 🔨	1	0	0	3	0	0	0	3	7

Sheet D	1	2	3	4	5	6	7	8	Final
Poland	0	2	0	2	0	1	0	0	5
Netherlands 🔨	2	0	1	0	1	0	4	1	9

Sheet F	1	2	3	4	5	6	7	8	Final
Mexico 🔨	2	0	0	4	0	4	2	X	12
Romania	0	2	1	0	3	0	0	X	6

=== Draw 3 ===
Saturday, December 3, 9:00

Sheet A	1	2	3	4	5	6	7	8	Final
Austria	1	3	0	3	1	1	X	X	9
Kazakhstan 🔨	0	0	1	0	0	0	X	X	1

Sheet D	1	2	3	4	5	6	7	8	Final
Slovenia	0	2	4	1	2	2	0	X	11
Nigeria 🔨	1	0	0	0	0	0	5	X	6

Sheet C	1	2	3	4	5	6	7	8	Final
Ukraine 🔨	0	0	1	1	2	0	0	0	4
Turkey	2	1	0	0	0	1	2	2	8

Sheet E	1	2	3	4	5	6	7	8	Final
Croatia	0	0	1	0	0	0	X	X	1
Slovakia 🔨	3	2	0	4	2	1	X	X	12

=== Draw 4 ===
Saturday, December 3, 12:30

Sheet A	1	2	3	4	5	6	7	8	Final
Lithuania 🔨	2	0	0	0	0	2	2	2	8
Wales	0	2	1	1	1	0	0	0	5

Sheet C	1	2	3	4	5	6	7	8	Final
China	1	0	5	0	2	2	0	X	10
Chinese Taipei 🔨	0	1	0	1	0	0	2	X	4

Sheet E	1	2	3	4	5	6	7	8	Final
Portugal 🔨	1	1	0	0	1	0	0	0	3
France	0	0	1	1	0	1	1	1	5

Sheet B	1	2	3	4	5	6	7	8	Final
Netherlands 🔨	1	0	0	2	1	0	0	0	4
New Zealand	0	1	1	0	0	3	1	2	8

Sheet D	1	2	3	4	5	6	7	8	Final
Latvia	0	1	0	1	1	1	1	2	7
Poland 🔨	1	0	2	0	0	0	0	0	3

Sheet F	1	2	3	4	5	6	7	8	Final
Romania	0	2	0	2	0	2	1	0	7
Ireland 🔨	2	0	4	0	1	0	0	1	8

=== Draw 5 ===
Saturday, December 3, 16:00

Sheet A	1	2	3	4	5	6	7	8	Final
Nigeria	0	0	0	1	0	0	1	X	2
Finland 🔨	2	1	2	0	1	1	0	X	7

Sheet D	1	2	3	4	5	6	7	8	Final
Guyana	0	0	2	0	0	0	X	X	2
Austria 🔨	1	3	0	2	1	1	X	X	8

Sheet B	1	2	3	4	5	6	7	8	Final
Spain 🔨	4	0	0	4	1	1	1	X	11
Ukraine	0	2	1	0	0	0	0	X	3

Sheet F	1	2	3	4	5	6	7	8	Final
Turkey 🔨	5	1	1	0	1	0	3	X	11
Hong Kong	0	0	0	1	0	3	0	X	4

=== Draw 6 ===
Saturday, December 3, 19:30

Sheet A	1	2	3	4	5	6	7	8	Final
India 🔨	2	2	0	0	0	0	0	X	4
Portugal	0	0	1	2	2	1	2	X	8

Sheet C	1	2	3	4	5	6	7	8	9	Final
Wales	1	0	2	0	0	2	0	2	0	7
France 🔨	0	1	0	2	2	0	2	0	1	8

Sheet E	1	2	3	4	5	6	7	8	Final
China 🔨	3	0	4	0	4	2	X	X	13
Lithuania	0	1	0	2	0	0	X	X	3

Sheet B	1	2	3	4	5	6	7	8	Final
Poland 🔨	5	2	1	1	1	1	X	X	11
Romania	0	0	0	0	0	0	X	X	0

Sheet D	1	2	3	4	5	6	7	8	Final
Mexico 🔨	1	0	0	0	2	0	X	X	3
Ireland	0	4	1	4	0	4	X	X	13

Sheet F	1	2	3	4	5	6	7	8	Final
Latvia	0	1	1	1	0	0	X	X	3
Netherlands 🔨	5	0	0	0	1	2	X	X	8

=== Draw 7 ===
Sunday, December 4, 9:00

Sheet A	1	2	3	4	5	6	7	8	Final
Latvia	0	2	1	0	1	0	0	X	4
New Zealand 🔨	2	0	0	2	0	2	1	X	7

Sheet C	1	2	3	4	5	6	7	8	Final
Poland	4	1	0	5	0	5	X	X	15
Mexico 🔨	0	0	1	0	1	0	X	X	2

Sheet E	1	2	3	4	5	6	7	8	9	Final
Netherlands 🔨	2	0	1	1	1	0	1	0	2	8
Romania	0	2	0	0	0	1	0	2	0	6

Sheet B	1	2	3	4	5	6	7	8	Final
India 🔨	0	0	0	1	0	0	X	X	1
France	1	3	1	0	4	2	X	X	11

Sheet D	1	2	3	4	5	6	7	8	Final
Lithuania 🔨	1	1	1	3	0	2	3	X	11
Portugal	0	0	0	0	3	0	0	X	3

Sheet F	1	2	3	4	5	6	7	8	Final
Chinese Taipei 🔨	0	0	1	0	2	1	0	3	7
Wales	2	1	0	2	0	0	1	0	6

=== Draw 8 ===
Sunday, December 4, 12:30

Sheet C	1	2	3	4	5	6	7	8	Final
Kazakhstan 🔨	0	1	3	0	1	0	0	3	8
Slovenia	1	0	0	1	0	1	3	0	6

Sheet E	1	2	3	4	5	6	7	8	Final
Finland 🔨	2	1	2	2	1	1	X	X	9
Guyana	0	0	0	0	0	0	X	X	0

Sheet D	1	2	3	4	5	6	7	8	Final
Spain 🔨	3	0	0	2	2	2	1	X	10
Hong Kong	0	1	2	0	0	0	0	X	3

Sheet F	1	2	3	4	5	6	7	8	Final
Slovakia	0	0	1	0	0	4	0	0	5
Ukraine 🔨	1	1	0	1	1	0	2	1	7

=== Draw 9 ===
Sunday, December 4, 16:00

Sheet A	1	2	3	4	5	6	7	8	Final
Ireland	0	0	1	0	2	1	1	0	5
Poland 🔨	1	1	0	3	0	0	0	1	6

Sheet C	1	2	3	4	5	6	7	8	Final
Romania 🔨	1	0	1	1	0	0	0	X	3
Latvia	0	3	0	0	3	3	2	X	11

Sheet E	1	2	3	4	5	6	7	8	Final
New Zealand	0	1	1	1	1	1	2	X	7
Mexico 🔨	1	0	0	0	0	0	0	X	1

Sheet B	1	2	3	4	5	6	7	8	Final
Wales 🔨	2	0	0	1	0	0	0	0	3
China	0	1	1	0	1	1	0	0	4

Sheet D	1	2	3	4	5	6	7	8	Final
Chinese Taipei	2	0	0	1	2	1	0	3	9
India 🔨	0	1	1	0	0	0	3	0	5

Sheet F	1	2	3	4	5	6	7	8	Final
France	0	3	0	0	1	2	0	X	6
Lithuania 🔨	1	0	1	1	0	0	1	X	4

=== Draw 10 ===
Sunday, December 4, 19:30

Sheet A	1	2	3	4	5	6	7	8	Final
Turkey 🔨	4	2	2	1	2	3	X	X	14
Croatia	0	0	0	0	0	0	X	X	0

Sheet C	1	2	3	4	5	6	7	8	Final
Spain 🔨	5	2	1	1	1	0	X	X	10
Slovakia	0	0	0	0	0	2	X	X	2

Sheet E	1	2	3	4	5	6	7	8	Final
Hong Kong	0	0	1	0	1	4	0	1	7
Ukraine 🔨	1	1	0	2	0	0	2	0	6

Sheet B	1	2	3	4	5	6	7	8	Final
Austria 🔨	2	0	2	3	2	2	0	X	11
Nigeria	0	1	0	0	0	0	1	X	2

Sheet D	1	2	3	4	5	6	7	8	Final
Finland	0	2	1	0	0	6	0	1	10
Kazakhstan 🔨	1	0	0	1	2	0	3	0	7

Sheet F	1	2	3	4	5	6	7	8	Final
Guyana 🔨	0	2	0	0	0	4	X	X	6
Slovenia	1	0	6	2	3	0	X	X	12

=== Draw 11 ===
Monday, December 5, 9:00

Sheet A	1	2	3	4	5	6	7	8	Final
France 🔨	0	2	3	0	0	3	0	X	8
Chinese Taipei	1	0	0	1	1	0	2	X	5

Sheet C	1	2	3	4	5	6	7	8	Final
Ireland	0	1	0	0	0	1	0	X	2
Netherlands 🔨	4	0	2	1	1	0	1	X	9

Sheet E	1	2	3	4	5	6	7	8	Final
Wales 🔨	1	1	0	1	0	3	0	1	7
India	0	0	1	0	3	0	1	0	5

Sheet B	1	2	3	4	5	6	7	8	Final
Mexico	0	3	1	1	0	0	1	0	6
Latvia 🔨	3	0	0	0	2	2	0	1	8

Sheet D	1	2	3	4	5	6	7	8	Final
Romania	0	1	0	0	1	0	X	X	2
New Zealand 🔨	4	0	4	1	0	2	X	X	11

Sheet F	1	2	3	4	5	6	7	8	Final
Portugal 🔨	0	0	0	2	0	2	0	1	5
China	1	1	2	0	1	0	2	0	7

=== Draw 12 ===
Monday, December 5, 12:30

Sheet B	1	2	3	4	5	6	7	8	Final
Finland	3	3	1	3	2	1	X	X	13
Slovenia 🔨	0	0	0	0	0	0	X	X	0

Sheet E	1	2	3	4	5	6	7	8	Final
Turkey	2	0	1	0	0	2	0	X	5
Spain 🔨	0	2	0	2	1	0	4	X	9

Sheet C	1	2	3	4	5	6	7	8	Final
Hong Kong 🔨	4	0	4	1	1	0	2	X	12
Croatia	0	1	0	0	0	2	0	X	3

Sheet F	1	2	3	4	5	6	7	8	Final
Kazakhstan 🔨	1	1	1	1	0	3	0	3	10
Nigeria	0	0	0	0	1	0	3	0	4

=== Draw 13 ===
Monday, December 5, 16:00

Sheet A	1	2	3	4	5	6	7	8	Final
Netherlands	2	0	0	5	1	4	X	X	12
Mexico 🔨	0	1	1	0	0	0	X	X	2

Sheet C	1	2	3	4	5	6	7	8	Final
India	1	0	0	0	0	1	0	X	2
Lithuania 🔨	0	3	1	1	0	0	2	X	7

Sheet E	1	2	3	4	5	6	7	8	Final
Ireland	0	1	0	0	1	0	2	X	4
Latvia 🔨	2	0	1	1	0	2	0	X	6

Sheet B	1	2	3	4	5	6	7	8	Final
Chinese Taipei 🔨	0	0	0	3	1	0	3	X	7
Portugal	1	3	4	0	0	1	0	X	9

Sheet D	1	2	3	4	5	6	7	8	Final
France	0	2	0	2	1	0	1	0	6
China 🔨	2	0	2	0	0	2	0	2	8

Sheet F	1	2	3	4	5	6	7	8	Final
New Zealand 🔨	1	2	1	2	0	2	0	X	8
Poland	0	0	0	0	1	0	2	X	3

=== Draw 14 ===
Monday, December 5, 19:30

Sheet B	1	2	3	4	5	6	7	8	Final
Slovakia	1	0	2	0	0	2	0	0	5
Turkey 🔨	0	1	0	2	1	0	3	2	9

Sheet D	1	2	3	4	5	6	7	8	Final
Ukraine 🔨	6	2	0	5	0	4	X	X	17
Croatia	0	0	1	0	1	0	X	X	2

Sheet C	1	2	3	4	5	6	7	8	Final
Nigeria	0	1	0	0	5	0	2	1	9
Guyana 🔨	2	0	3	3	0	5	0	0	13

Sheet E	1	2	3	4	5	6	7	8	Final
Slovenia 🔨	1	0	0	0	0	1	0	X	2
Austria	0	3	1	1	1	0	1	X	7

== Playoffs ==
=== A Bracket ===
Qualifier 1
A1	China	10
C2	Austria	13
C2	Austria	9
D2	Turkey	3
B1	New Zealand	7
D2	Turkey	9

Qualifier 2
C1	Finland	6
B2	Netherlands	7
B2	Netherlands	7
D1	Spain	9
D1	Spain	9
A2	France	2

=== B Bracket ===
			Qualifier 3
			B2	Netherlands	8
A1	China	5	B1	New Zealand	7
B1	New Zealand	6

			Qualifier 4
			D2	Turkey	6
C1	Finland	10	C1	Finland	5
A2	France	4

=== A Event ===
==== Semifinals ====
Tuesday, December 6, 10:00

Sheet B	1	2	3	4	5	6	7	8	9	Final
China 🔨	2	2	0	0	4	0	2	0	0	10
Austria	0	0	2	2	0	5	0	1	3	13

Sheet C	1	2	3	4	5	6	7	8	Final
Finland	2	0	2	0	1	0	1	0	6
Netherlands 🔨	0	2	0	2	0	2	0	1	7

Sheet D	1	2	3	4	5	6	7	8	Final
New Zealand 🔨	1	2	0	2	0	2	0	0	7
Turkey	0	0	3	0	3	0	2	1	9

Sheet E	1	2	3	4	5	6	7	8	Final
Spain 🔨	5	2	1	0	0	1	X	X	9
France	0	0	0	1	1	0	X	X	2

==== Finals ====
Tuesday, December 6, 15:00

Sheet C	1	2	3	4	5	6	7	8	Final
Austria 🔨	2	2	3	0	0	2	X	X	9
Turkey	0	0	0	2	1	0	X	X	3

Sheet D	1	2	3	4	5	6	7	8	Final
Netherlands	1	0	1	1	0	3	0	1	7
Spain 🔨	0	2	0	0	2	0	5	0	9

=== B Event ===
==== Semifinals ====
Tuesday, December 6, 15:00

Sheet B	1	2	3	4	5	6	7	8	Final
Finland 🔨	3	0	0	1	0	2	2	2	10
France	0	3	1	0	0	0	0	0	4

Sheet E	1	2	3	4	5	6	7	8	Final
China 🔨	1	0	2	1	0	0	1	0	5
New Zealand	0	1	0	0	2	1	0	2	6

==== Finals ====
Wednesday, December 7, 10:00

Sheet C	1	2	3	4	5	6	7	8	9	Final
Netherlands	0	2	0	2	1	1	1	0	1	8
New Zealand 🔨	1	0	4	0	0	0	0	2	0	7

Sheet D	1	2	3	4	5	6	7	8	Final
Turkey 🔨	1	2	0	0	0	1	1	1	6
Finland	0	0	2	1	2	0	0	0	5
