= Alexandru Tzaicu =

Romanian surgeon

- Born: 22 April 1883; Bivolari, Kingdom of Romania
- Died: 7 February 1958 (aged 74); Hârlău, Socialist Republic of Romania
- Scientific career
- Fields: medicine

Alexandru Tzaicu (22 April 1883 – 7 February 1958) was a Romanian surgeon known for being the first surgeon to have self-operated an inguinal hernia.

== Biography ==
Alexandru Tzaicu attended high school and medical studies in Iași, being a scholar of the Adamachi Fund of the Romanian Academy. In 1909, in order to demonstrate the qualities of the spinal anaesthesia method developed by the surgeons Thoma Ionescu and Amza Jianu, Tzaicu performed an inguinal hernia self-operation. This surgical intervention was described in paper and later allowed him to get a doctorate in surgery. Tzaicu self-operated his left groin, being the first self-intervention of this kind in the world (the next "first" being the American surgeon Evan O'Neill Kane who performed in 1921 self-surgery for appendicitis under local anesthetic with novocaine). The surgery was performed in a sitting position, Tzaicu being assisted by Ernest Juvara, a professor of surgical anatomy at the Iași Medical School. There were photographers who subsequently reported in the press the conduct of the operation, which was described in an article published in the French academic journal La Presse Médicale. Extracts from this journal, containing the report of Tzaicu's intervention, were subsequently published by Raymond Nogué in the volume dedicated to anesthesia of Traité de stomatologie and by Thoma Ionescu in his La rachianesthésie générale.

After obtaining his doctorate, Tzaicu worked as a surgeon in hospitals in Iași and later opened a private clinic, Sanatoriul Dr. Tzaicu, located between the University of Iași and the Costache Negruzzi National College. He performed an important activity in the field of reconstructive surgeons. He later moved to Bucharest where he continued to profess, having as a patient in May 1938, among others, the art historian Alexandru Tzigara-Samurcaș, who suffered an inguinal hernia in the right groin.
