= Șomuzul Mic =

- Location within Romania

Location
- Country: Romania
- Counties: Suceava County
- Villages: Hreațca, Vulturești, Giurgești, Rotunda

Physical characteristics
- Mouth: Siret
  - coordinates: 47.4962°N 26.5580°E
- Length: 30 km (19 mi)
- Basin size: 121 km^{2} (47 sq mi)

Basin features
- Progression: Siret→ Danube→ Black Sea

The Șomuzul Mic is a right tributary of the river Siret in Romania. It discharges into the Siret at Rotunda, near Liteni. Its length is 30 km (19 mi) and its basin size is 121 km^{2} (47 sq mi).
