= Malyi Seret =

Location
- Country: Ukraine

Physical characteristics
- Source
  - location: Eastern Carpathians
- Mouth
  - location: Siret at Kamyanka
  - coordinates: 48.0511°N 25.8662°E
- Length: 61 km (38 mi)

Basin features
- Progression: Siret→ Danube→ Black Sea

The Malyi Seret (Ukrainian: Малий Серет, lit. 'little Siret') is a right tributary of the river Siret in the Chernivtsi Oblast, western Ukraine. It rises in the Eastern Carpathians. It flows through the villages Banyliv Pidhirnyi, Cheresh, Verkhni Petrivtsi, Nyzhni Petrivtsi, Kupka and Sucheveny, and it discharges into the Siret near the village Kamyanka.
