= Volcineț =

Volcineț is the Romanian name for several places in Chernivtsi Oblast in Ukraine:

- Volcineț, Stary Vovchynets, Chernivtsi Raion
- Volcineț, Vovchynets, a village in Lukivtsi, Vyzhnytsia Raion
- Volcineți, Vovchynets, Dniester Raion
- Volcinețul Nou, Novyy Vovchynets, a village in Cherepkivtsi, Chernivtsi Raion
