= Vulturești, Suceava =

Vulturești
- Commune
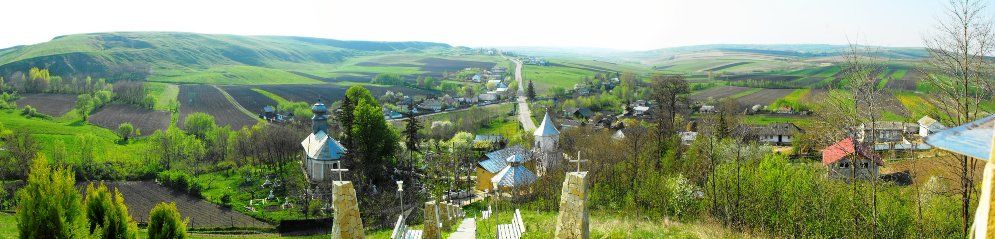
- Hreațca village

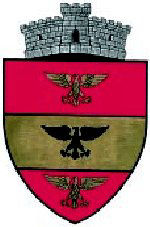
- Coat of arms

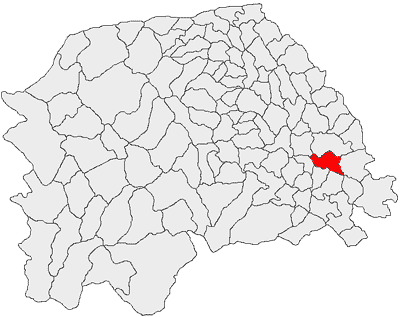
- Location in Suceava County

- Location in Romania
- Coordinates: 47°31′20″N 26°22′53″E
- Country: Romania
- County: Suceava
- Subdivisions: Vulturești, Pleșești, Giurgești, Hreațca, Jacota, Merești, Osoi, Valea Glodului

Government
  - Mayor (2024–2028): Cornel Salamaha (PSD)
- Area: 51.44 km^{2} (19.86 sq mi)
- Elevation: 357 m (1,171 ft)
- Population (2021-12-01): 3,408
  - Density: 66.25/km^{2} (171.6/sq mi)
- Time zone: UTC+02:00 (EET)
  - Summer (DST): UTC+03:00 (EEST)
- Postal code: 727620
- Area code: +40 x30
- Vehicle reg.: SV
- Website: vulturesti-suceava.ro

Vulturești is a commune located in Suceava County, Western Moldavia, Romania. It is composed of eight villages: Giurgești, Hreațca, Jacota, Merești, Osoi, Pleșești (the commune centre), Valea Glodului, and Vulturești.

The commune is situated in the southeastern part of Suceava County, on the banks of the river Șomuzul Mic. Vulturești is located at a distance of 14 km (8.7 mi) from Fălticeni and 29 km (18 mi) from the county seat, Suceava. It borders Udești commune to the north, the town of Liteni to the east, Dolhești, Preutești, and Hârtop communes to the south, and Bunești and Bosanci communes to the west.

== Natives ==
- Constantin Costăchescu (1909–1983), submarine commander in the Romanian Navy during World War II
