= Vlad Neculau =

Romania international rugby union player

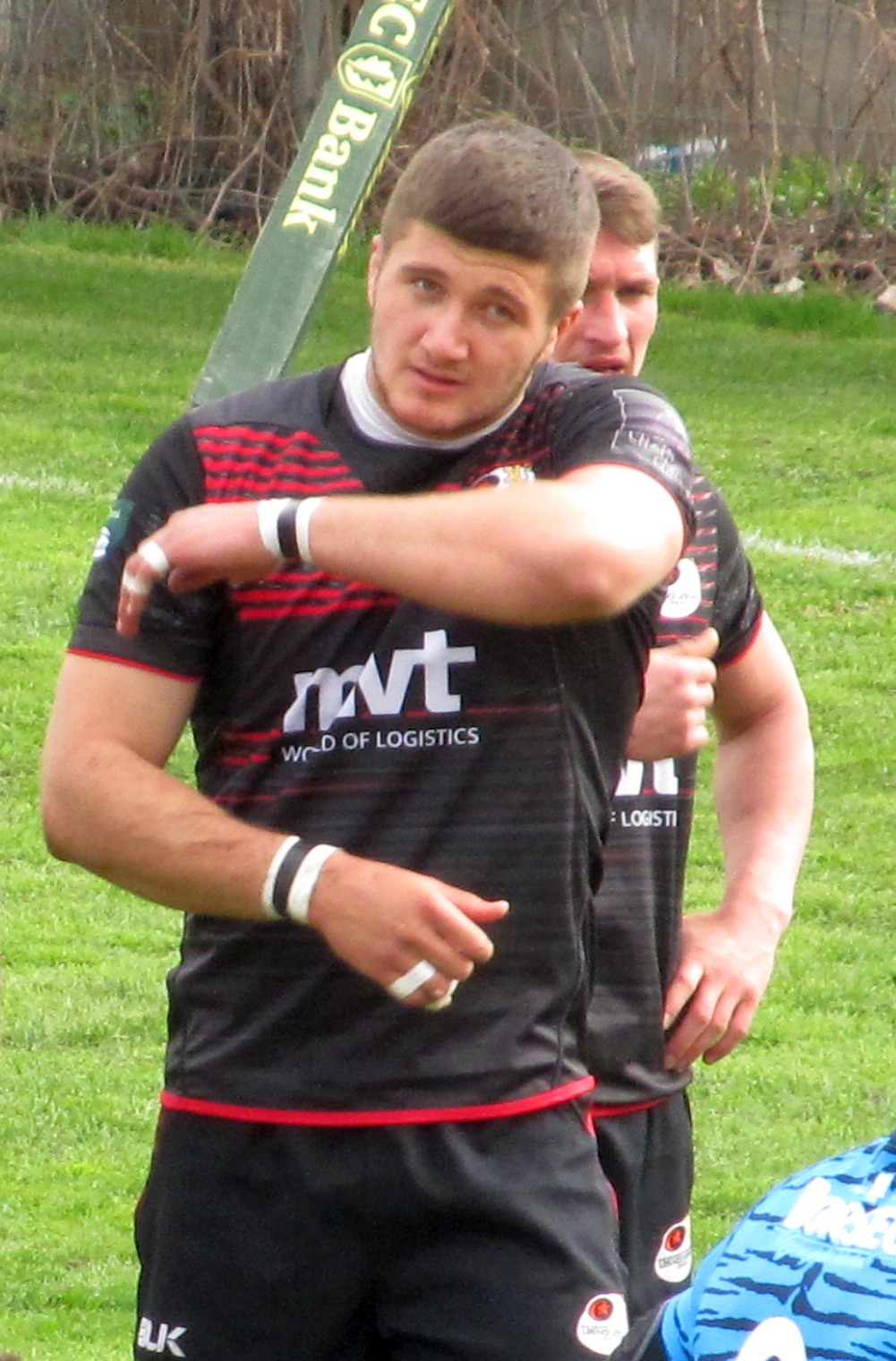
- Vlad Neculau playing for Timișoara Saracens during the 2019 Cupa României Final
- Full name: Vlad Neculau
- Born: 7 January 1998 (age 28) Bivolari, Romania
- Height: 1.92 m (6 ft 3 1/2 in)
- Weight: 108 kg (17 st 0 lb; 238 lb)
- School: Liceul Alexandru Ioan Cuza, Iași

Rugby union career
- Position(s): Flanker, back row
- Current team: Timișoara Saracens
Youth career
- 2013–15: CSS Unirea Iași
- 2015–17: Timișoara Saracens
Senior career
Years	Team	Apps	(Points)
2017–Present	Timișoara Saracens	27	(15)
- Correct as of 13 January 2019
International career
Years	Team	Apps	(Points)
2019–Present	Romania	2	(0)
- Correct as of 13 January 2019

Vlad Neculau (born 7 January 1998) is a Romanian rugby union player. He plays as a flanker for professional SuperLiga club Timișoara Saracens.

== Club career ==
Vlad Neculau started playing rugby as a youth for a school based local Romanian club, CSS Unirea Iași, in Iași. After two years he joined the youth ranks of Timișoara Saracens, followed by his professional debut in 2017 for the same club.

== International career ==
Neculau is also selected for Romania's national team, the Oaks, making his international debut during the Week 5 of 2019 Rugby Europe Championship in a match against the Zwarte Duivels / Diables Noirs on 17 March 2019.
