= Soloneț (Prut) =

- Location within Romania

Location
- Country: Romania
- Counties: Iași County
- Villages: Traian, Soloneț

Physical characteristics
- Mouth: Prut
  - coordinates: 47.4965°N 27.4675°E
- Length: 11 km (6.8 mi)
- Basin size: 27 km^{2} (10 sq mi)

Basin features
- Progression: Prut→ Danube→ Black Sea
- River code: XIII.1.14

The Soloneț is a right tributary of the river Prut in Romania. It flows into the Prut in the village Soloneț. Its length is 11 km (6.8 mi) and its basin size is 27 km^{2} (10 sq mi).
