= Elena Murariu =

Romanian painter and iconographer (born 1963)

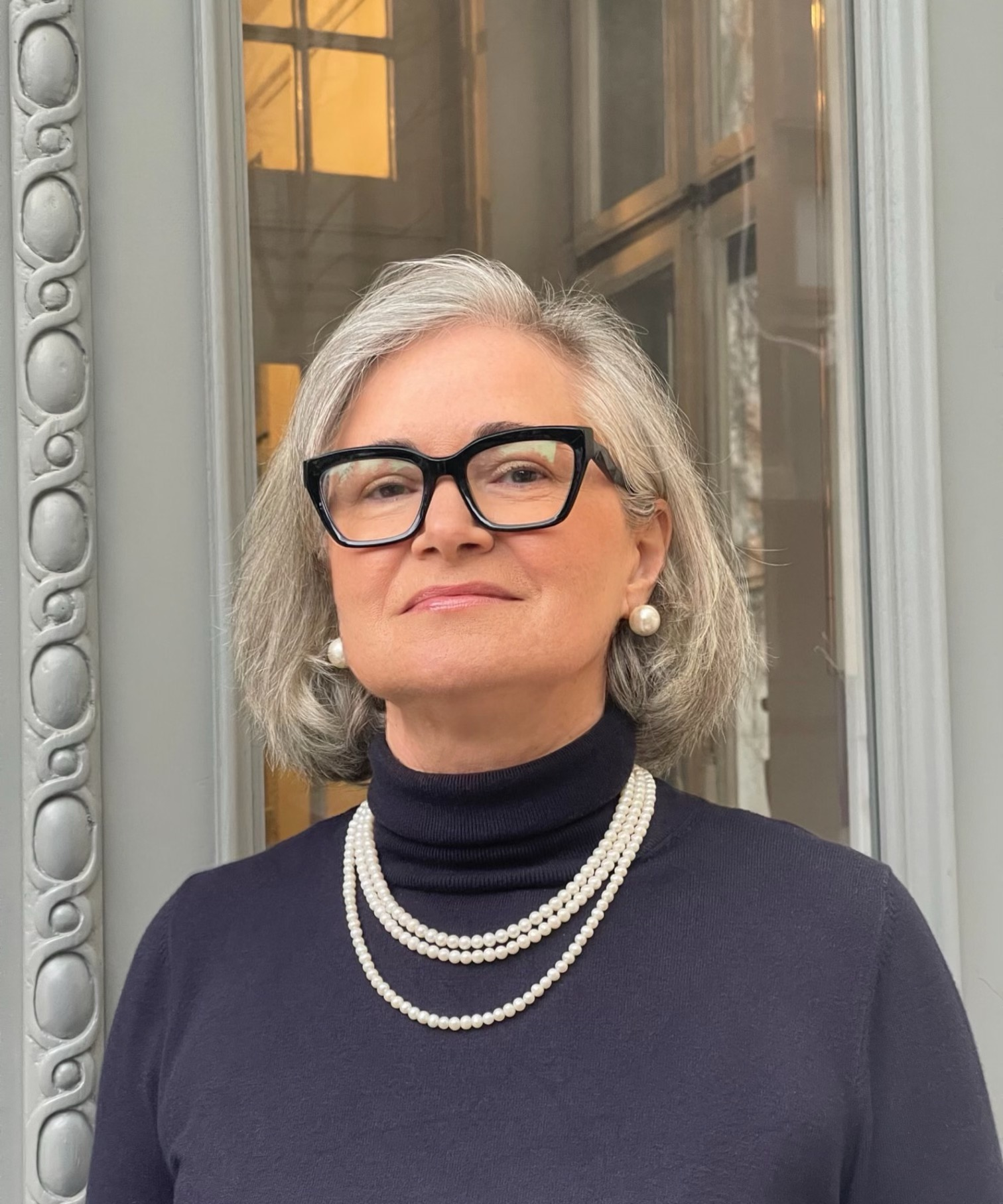
- Murariu in 2024
- Born: Elena Murariu; 29 June 1963 (age 63); Zvoriștea, Suceava County, Romanian People's Republic
- Education: Bucharest National University of Arts
- Known for: Painting, drawing

Elena Murariu (Romanian pronunciation: [eˈle.na mu.raˈri.u]; born 29 June 1963) is a Romanian painter and iconographer. She is known for her icons and graphics works.

== Biography ==
She was born in Zvoriștea, a commune in Suceava County. She started to study fine arts in 1973 at the School of Music and Fine Arts of Botoșani. She left for her high-school studies in Iași at the age of 14 attending "Octav Bancilă" Fine Arts High-school of Iași. In 1983 she left for Bucharest National University of Arts. She graduated in 1987 and immediately started to work as a curator and also as a mural painting restorer. After a decade in which she dedicated herself to gaining experience in the field of restoration of historical monuments she began, starting from 1990, to constantly participate in group and personal exhibitions with works of graphics and icons. Elena Murariu's paintings combine calligraphic and lyrical lines, light touch, and painterly sensibility manifest as transparent, unique compositions. Her art reflects her authentic experience and vision, bridging the gap between theory and practice in the realm of iconography.

As one of the most important contemporary painters and iconographers her works were exhibited in Romania all over Europe (Paris, Barcelona, Athens, Lisbon, Prague, Venice, St. Petersburg, Rome, Kyiv, Belgrade) and also in the US (New York). Also, she participated in research papers about restoration of mural paintings. One of her most important projects is the iconography of the Brancovan Holy Martyrs. She also painted the iconostasis of the church of Cotroceni Palace.

As in her recent artwork, she focused on paying tribute to Romanian Martyrs - the "Martyrs" exhibition and as well the album published on the occasion.

Răzvan Theodorescu regards her as a modern painter, one that "... is clearly obsessed, that is the word for it, beautifully obsessed with creating an iconography which is, and I do insist and pray that the esteemed clergy take this exactly as it is, a modern iconography. ... In the last few years, Elena Murariu has created the prolegomena of a well-deserved visual and literary commemoration of the Brâncoveanu moment".

Nicoletta Isar when talking about the symbol of "the Ladder" in Christianity references Elena Murariu as "... In an inspired synthesis, one of the most innovative reconfigurations of the icon, Elena Murariu succeeds in capturing within a single image the complex meaning of this iconographic subject."

Fr. Michel Quenot considers Elena Murariu, in regards to her project "Martirii", as being someone that created a remarkable work, that will be taken as an inspiration source in the future and also a great homage to the Romanian peoples.

Luigi Bambulea when talking about Elena Murariu's "Martirii" album, considers that she reached her artistic and existential maturity by enriching two types of traditions: that of artistic expression in plastic art, painting and that of religious and mystical experiences, synchronizing them with the binder of sacred art.
