= Constantin Costăchescu =

Constantin "Bibi" Costăchescu (12 April 1909 – 8 August 1983) was a submarine commander in the Romanian Navy during the Second World War. He is the only Romanian submarine commander to sink an enemy ship.

== Early days ==
He was born in 1909 in Pleșești, Suceava County, the son of Olga and Vasile Costăchescu, both teachers. He went to school in his native village and in Fălticeni, after which he attended military school in Iași, graduating in 1928. He then enrolled in the Naval Academy in Constanța, finishing second in his class in 1930, with the rank of aspirant. Costăchescu served on the destroyer NMS Mărășești and in 1933 graduated from the Special Naval School.

== The attack ==
On 1 October 1938, Costăchescu was appointed second in command of NMS Dolphin, and from 1 October 1939 to November 1943, he served as its commanding officer (CO). In June 1941 Romania entered World War II on the side of the Axis powers; in October of that year, the Romanian Army joined in the Crimean campaign. On its 5th patrol in the Black Sea, the Dolphin's orders were to cut the Soviet supply routes for Sevastopol. The patrol lasted from 2–7 November 1941. It was his 3rd patrol as the CO of the Dolphin (from the first 5 patrols of the Dolphin, Costăchescu was the CO for the 1st, 3rd and 5th). On the morning of 5 November at 08:05, sub-lieutenant Constantin Stegaru spotted a big transport ship steaming for Yalta. At 08:43, Costăchescu launched one aft tube torpedo from 800 metres (2,625 ft) away. In a couple of moments, the torpedo explosion followed by another bigger one could be heard. It is possible that the ship was not escorted, because the first contact with the Soviet submarine-hunter ships took place after an hour. The anti submarine attack lasted from 10:30 until 18:30 and there were 80 to 90 depth charge explosions. The sunken Soviet ship was the 1,975-ton cargo Uralets (also known as Uralles).

Romanian historians identified the Russian ship as being the Uralles, 1975-tonne cargo boat, but Soviet archives state that the Uralles was sunk by Luftwaffe bombers in the port of Eupatoria on 29 October 1941. To this day, the identity of the ship remains an open debate.

Costăchescu was awarded the Order of Michael the Brave 3rd class. He was also the recipient of the Order of the Star of Romania, Knight class; the Order of the Crown (Romania), Knight class; and the Iron Cross, 1st class and 2nd class.

== After the war ==
After the end of the war, Costăchescu served as an instructor for Romanian submariners and as a professor at the Naval Academy in Constanța, teaching future navy officers spatial geometry. He died in 1983, after being hit by a car, and a hard fall on ice during a cold winter in Constanța. He was buried in the city's Central Cemetery.

Because he fought in the war against the Soviet Union, the Romanian Communist regime never acknowledged his merits.
