= Dan Lupașcu =

Jurist

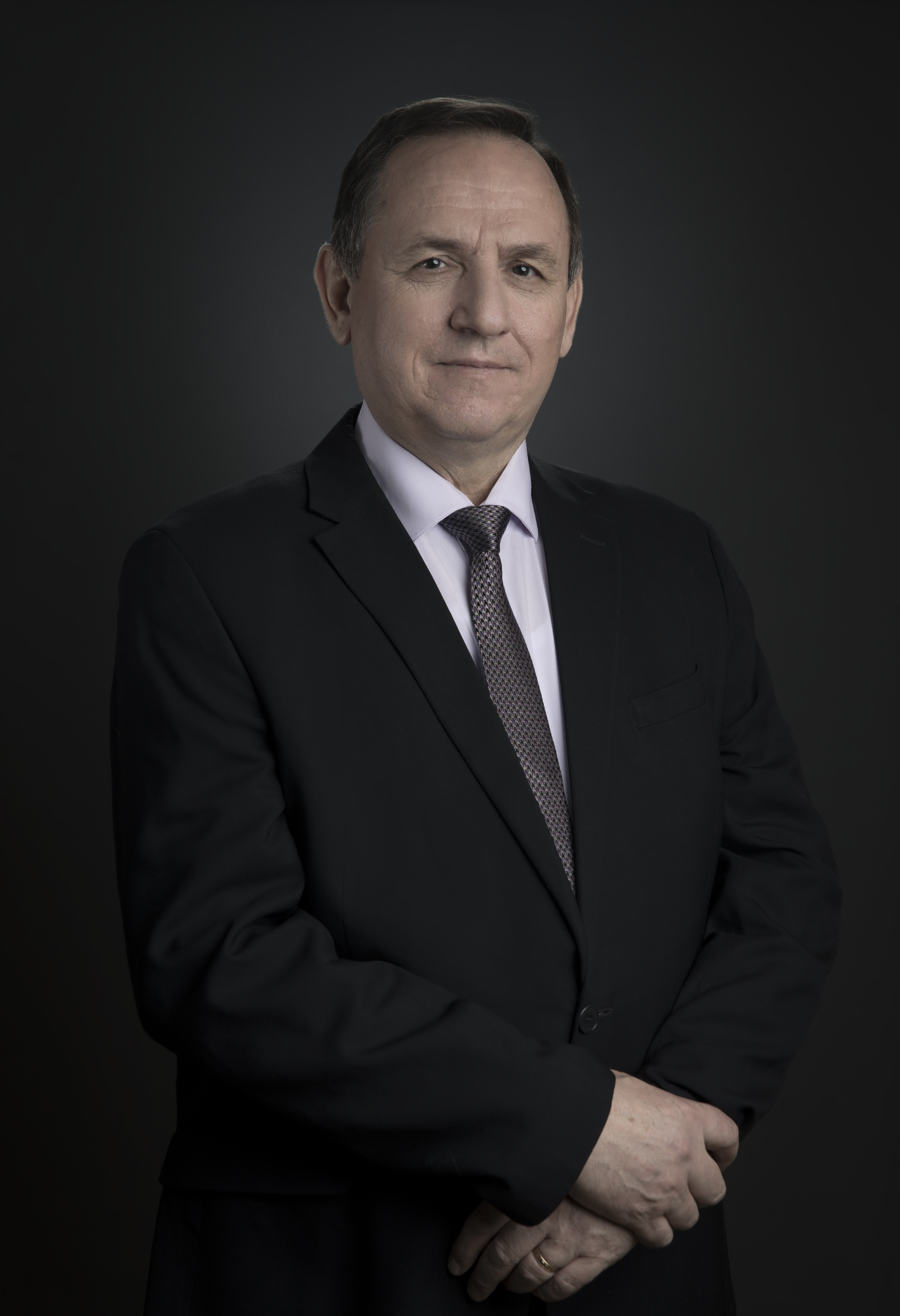

President of the Romanian Superior Council of Magistracy
- In office 12 January 2005 – 12 January 2006
- Preceded by: -
- Succeeded by: Iulian Gâlcă

President of the Bucharest Court of Appeal
- In office 17 May 1999 – 16 May 2003 (first)
- In office 17 May 2003 – 31 December 2006 (second), suspended from office, upon request, on 1 January 2007, due to his option for a full-time position in the Superior Council of Magistracy
- In office 3 February 2011 – 3 July 2012 (in furtherance of the second mandate)

Dan Lupașcu (born 19 November 1962) is a Romanian jurist, former judge, currently attorney-at-law and professor.

He served as judge for more than 25 years and held various managerial positions within the Romanian courts of law. Between 2003 and 2011, he was a member of the Superior Council of Magistracy and the first to be elected as its president after this institution reopened in 1993.

== Early life ==
Dan Lupașcu was born in the commune of Zvoriștea, county of Suceava. He graduated from the Faculty of Law at the University of Bucharest in 1990, top of his class. In 2001, he received his Doctor of Law degree from the same higher education institution with the PhD thesis „Enforcement of Main Penalties".

== Professional career ==
=== Judge ===
In 1990, Dan Lupașcu was admitted as trainee judge at the 5th District Court in Bucharest where he was delegated as vice-president from December 1994 to August 1997. He was later on elected as president of the Tribunal of Bucharest (1997–1999) and of the Bucharest Court of Appeal (1999–2006 and 2011–2012). After termination of his term of office as president of the Bucharest Court of Appeal, Dan Lupașcu did not run for other positions, resuming his position as a judge at the same court. He argued in an interview that he still wants to do "the most important thing one can do in magistracy, namely to administer justice".

His activity as both judge and manager of a court of law is generally appreciated. As president of the Tribunal of Bucharest and of the Bucharest Court of Appeal, he was particularly preoccupied, along with some representatives of the Superior Council of Magistracy and Ministry of Justice, by: improving the efficiency of the judicial activity, creating appropriate working conditions for the courts, establishing and implementing an optimal workload for judges and court clerks and enhancing confidence in justice. During his mandates, almost all courts under the Bucharest Court of Appeal moved to new or reconditioned premises (the best example being the Bucharest Palace of Justice), the Tribunal of Ilfov was reopened and Cornetu District Court was established. Dan Lupașcu took the initiative of creating a new website for the Bucharest Court of Appeal (enabling the virtual touring of the Palace of Justice), giving names to Palace of Justice courtrooms, displaying the names of the judges in the courtrooms, opening a museum of justice and so on.

Some of the decisions made by tribunal formations he had been a member of cause controversy in the printed press. Thus, in March 2004, amid divergences with Rodica Stănoiu, the then minister of justice, Dan Lupașcu was accused, in an article published in the daily newspaper ‘România Liberă’ by journalist Silviu Alupei, that he and the lawyer and deputy Ion Neagu „patronize the justice mafia" after he decided in 2001 to release the Turkish national Husayn Saral, arrested for armed robbery in his home country. Investigations led by the General Inspection Unit within the Ministry of Justice did not confirm these allegations.

Another scandal in the media was caused by the Bucharest Court of Appeal's decision to settle the action for annulment filed by Dan Voiculescu. As president of the formation, Dan Lupașcu made a separate opinion for he considered that the legal remedy had to be allowed and that the judges who ruled on the appeal were incompatible.

=== Member of the Superior Council of Magistracy (SCM) ===
Dan Lupașcu was elected three times in the general assemblies of judges as a member of SCM and managed this instruction as both general secretary (2003–2004) and president. In his capacity as general secretary, he signed in September 2004 with the others members of SCM the protocol for the taking-up of duties regarding the career of magistrates from the Ministry of Justice, an event he considered at the time to be „unique in our judiciary history".

On the first day of performing the new duties – 1 October 2004 – there was a huge outcry in the media involving the Superior Council of Magistracy as one of the female judges at the Tribunal of Bucharest was accused to have starred in an adult movie. As general secretary of the Superior Council of Magistracy, Lupașcu said: „I feel desolated about receiving such a gift on this special day when the Superior Council of Magistracy assumed its new duties” and expressed his disappointment that the Prosecution Office failed to inform the Superior Council of Magistracy about the case despite being aware of it for several months. In the light of verifications conducted by inspectors, the management of the Bucharest Court of Appeal, led by Dan Lupașcu, decided to initiate disciplinary action and was appreciated for their "intransigence and firmness towards protecting the image of Romanian justice". Later on, after being criticized for the forensic identification expertise, Lupașcu was accused of defending the concerned judge. Being also accused of poor case management in relation with the media, he filed his resignation as manager of SCM. Upon the explicit and unanimous request of all Superior Council of Magistracy members, Lupașcu reconsidered his resignation.

On 12 January 2005, when elected as president of SCM, Dan Lupașcu, hinting at attempted political influences in justice, declared in the presence of the Head of State: „Only those who cannot control themselves may fall victims to political influence. The Superior Council of Magistracy is a ship staying afloat even though tsunami waves hitting from the left and from the right try to make it change course".

As both president and member of SCM, Dan Lupașcu had plenty of disagreements with the minister of justice Monica Macovei and President Traian Băsescu on the reform of justice and the independence of the judiciary. Accused alongside other colleagues of blocking the reform requested by the European Commission, Dan Lupașcu envisioned the process differently, by declaring, among others, that „justice reform must start bottom-up and/or from the bottom" rather than „out of hatred" for the judiciary system. Lupașcu also opposed to changing the laws of justice in 2005, disavowed „the telecast reform" and „telecast arrests", and militated for the administration of court budgets by SCM or by the High Court of Cassation and Justice, the appointment of all heads of courts and prosecution offices by SCM (competitive selection), proper funding of judiciary institutions, supplying the optimum workload to courts and prosecution offices, increasing the salaries of magistrates, abolishing the participation of magistrates in elections offices, and setting-up of a group of judicial inspectors as self-governing body. He was also in favour of an identical status between judges and prosecutors and criticized the fact that prosecutors worked under the authority of the minister of justice.

At the end of the term of office, the first management team of the new SCM, composed of the president and judge Dan Lupașcu and vice-president and prosecutor Liviu Dăscălescu, was congratulated by President Traian Băsescu for their contributions to the justice reform. As regards the independence of the judiciary, the Head of State said that „2005 was the best year from 1946 to the present day". The European Commissioner Jonathan Scheele also noted „the success of SCM in ensuring the internal organization and coordination of court activities".

In January 2006, Dan Lupașcu declined the invitation sent by the prime minister Călin Popescu-Tăriceanu to attend a political meeting held at the Palace of the Government and said that „he will not agree with the Superior Council of Magistracy's subordination to the executive or the politics", his position being appreciated by a number of publications.

Criticized for an alleged conflict of interest in being both the president of the Bucharest Court of Appeal and a member of SCM while most judicial inspectors worked for that court -Dan Lupașcu opted out at 1 January 2007 from the presidency in favour of a permanent term of office at SCM, although Decision no. 375/2005 of the Constitutional Court allowed multiple office-holding without exceptions.

In June 2009, judge Dan Lupașcu represented the Superior Council of Magistracy in the Constitutional Court sitting during which the request for settlement of the constitutional conflict between the judicial authority, represented by the Superior Council of Magistracy, on the one hand, and the executive authority, represented by the Romanian Government and the Ministry of Justice and Civic Freedoms, on the other hand, was discussed.

In a SCM sitting in September 2009, the President Traian Băsescu heavily criticized the activity of SCM members, complaining that the approach to the concept of „independence" was wrong and urging them to take measures to put an end to the protests of magistrates. Against the background of such critics, Dan Lupașcu complained that the Head of State „is not familiar with the Constitution" and „obstructs the justice rather than help it".

In January 2011, the President of Romania argued inter alia that „no justice system in the EU ever did so much harm to a country than the Romanian system". Dan Lupașcu firmly challenged such allegations.

Dan Lupașcu's running for another mandate at SCM in 2010 was successfully disputed in court. In this dispute, Dan Lupașcu raised the exception of unconstitutionality underlying the settlement on the merits of the case, which was rejected with a majority of votes by the Constitutional Court. The Senate's decision to approve his election in SCM was overruled with a majority of votes by the Constitutional Court, such decision being welcomed by the European Commission. After this decision was issued and upon his leaving from the Superior Council of Magistracy, Lupașcu was accused of misconduct and lack of independence in the exercise of his duties. Upon his request, the Judicial Inspection conducted investigations and found such allegations to be ungrounded. Under the circumstances, the full Superior Court of Magistracy resolved on 17 March 2011 to admit his request for professional liability defence and noted that „by the severity of disparaging and untrue remarks about judge Dan Lupașcu, the said press articles are likely to adversely and unduly influence the public opinion on the integrity and moral and professional probity of the magistrate and make him prone to vilification and damage to his professional reputation and public image".

As member and president of the Superior Council of Magistracy, Dan Lupașcu involved in 2004 with other peers in the drafting of justice laws and secondary legislation (regulations, code of conduct), prepared the plan for the organization of the new Superior Council of Magistracy and has taken action to create the website and secure a permanent office for this institution. He was at the same time criticized especially for the promotion of certain magistrates to the High Court of Cassation and Justice, and allegedly protecting certain colleagues as well as for his new candidature for a position in SCM.

Lupașcu was project leader of the candidate country for the implementation of the twinning Convention between Romania and Germany, with the objective "Strengthening the functioning of the judiciary system" in Romania and its representative body – the Superior Council of Magistracy", and attended numerous internal and international meetings on the judicial authority. His name has appeared several times in the press as a possible candidate standing to be the minister of justice.

=== Faculty member ===
In parallel with his work as a judge, Dan Lupașcu taught at Dimitrie Cantemir Christian University Bucharest (1993–1995), University of Bucharest (1994–1995), National Institute of Magistracy (1993 to date) and Nicolae Titulescu University Bucharest (2002 to date).

He is a professor at the Faculty of Law within Nicolae Titulescu University Bucharest where he teaches Family law, International Private Law and Judicial Organization, and also a trainer of Civil Law at the National Institute of Magistracy.

=== Attorney-at-law ===
In 2016, after retiring from the judiciary, he set up the individual law firm "Lupașcu Dan". The multidisciplinary theoretical training and long experience as a judge facilitated his rapid integration among lawyers. Through his own office or in the form of professional cooperation, the lawyer Dan Lupașcu provided/provides legal assistance to Romanian or foreign citizens, especially in complex criminal cases, known in the press as: The „Limousine” case; „The Mineriads" case; the „Rompetrol II’’ file; „Gala Bute" case; the extradition file of a Turkish citizen etcetera.

== Scientific activity ==
Dan Lupașcu was member of two scientific research teams (2008–2011) and national correspondent in a European research project for the European Commission (2015), and published several legal works (studies, articles, notes, monographs, academic coursebooks, case reports, collections of laws). He was also a member of numerous legislative drafting commissions and editorial boards of certain law journals.

== Activity as member of the civil society ==
Dan Lupașcu is the founding member of the Romanian Magistrates Association. He declined such membership in 1998 in response to some public declarations made by certain association board members.

Between 1998 and 2002, he was elected deputy in the Eparchial Assembly of the Archdiocese of Bucharest belonging to the Romanian Patriarchy, as member in the Cultural Committee.

== Honours, rewards, diplomas ==
In 2000, he was conferred upon the Order of the Star of Romania, Officer Rank by the President of Romania Emil Constantinescu for „outstanding merits in the framing of the judicial doctrine, reforming of justice and fair enforcement of laws". Two of the scientific works co-authored by Dan Lupașcu have been rewarded by the Union of Jurists of Romania. Dan Lupașcu was made an „honorary citizen" of his home commune and awarded other diplomas by the Superior council of Magistracy, Union of Jurists of Romania, General Inspectorate of the Romanian Police, International Union of Bailiffs, Union of Bailiffs of Romania, Court of International Commercial Arbitration and Town Hall of Călărași, etcetera. In 2005, he was awarded a Certificate of Appreciation by the United States European Command in recognition of „his remarkable aid to the EUCOM Judge Advocate, the US Embassy – the Office of Defense Cooperation in Bucharest, and the legal study project in December 2004".
