= Gheorghe Flutur =

Romanian politician

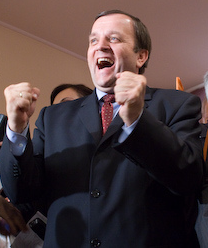
Gheorghe Flutur in 2007

Gheorghe Flutur (born 8 July 1960 in Botoșana, Suceava County, Romania) is a Romanian politician, member of the National Liberal Party (PNL). He was also a member of the Liberal Democratic Party (PLD) as vice-president, since December 2006 until December 2007, then a member of the Democratic Liberal Party (PDL) until eventually returning to the PNL. Between December 2004 and November 2006, Flutur was the Minister of Agriculture in the Tăriceanu government (as a PNL member). Between 2 and 10 April 2022, Flutur served as acting/ad interim president of the PNL, after the resignation of Florin Cîțu, until the election of Nicolae Ciucă.

== Homophobic comments ==
Flutur generated controversy in June 2007 when, as the vice-president of the Liberal Democrats, he was asked how he would react if a party colleague of his was gay. Flutur replied by stating that, "We haven't thought about this but, personally, I would firmly be one who would support colder relations with this person. In this way, Christian morality must be the one that we should follow."

In a Cotidianul editorial published in reaction to Flutur's remark, Costi Rogozanu accused the politician of "fundamental hypocrisy" and homophobic populism.

In June 2007, during Bucharest's annual GayFest, Flutur also stated in a TV interview that he has "a poor opinion" of LGBT people, and that he disapproves of the liberties they have obtained.

The National Council for Combating Discrimination, Romania's equality body, condemned Flutur's "homophobic discourse and inappropriate language".

== 2010 floods ==
During July 2010, Gheorghe Flutur, then president of Suceava County Council, told the Mediafax news agency that his region was one of the worst hit in the country in the morning of the 29th as he coordinated local relief work in his flood-affected county.
