= La Presse Médicale =

French academic journal of medicine

- Discipline: Medicine
- Language: French

Publication details
- History: 1983
- Publisher: Elsevier (France)
- Frequency: Monthly
- Impact factor: 1.071 (2016)

Standard abbreviations
- ISO 4: Presse Méd.
- NLM: Presse Med

Indexing
- ISSN: 0755-4982

Links
- Journal homepage; Online access

La Presse Médicale is a French peer-reviewed academic journal of medicine established in 1983. It is published by Elsevier, and is edited by Loic Guillevin and Frédérique Lesaulnier. An English supplement, Quarterly Medical Review, is published 4 times a year. In 2003, it merged with Annales de Médecine Interne, formerly known as Bulletins et Mémoires de la Société Médicale des Hôpitaux de Paris and Bulletin de la Société Médicale des Hôpitaux de Paris.

== Abstracting and indexing ==
The journal is abstracted and indexed in the following bibliographic databases:

- Current Contents/Life Sciences
- Current Contents/Clinical Medicine
- EMBASE/Excerpta Medica
- MEDLINE
- Pascal/INIST-CNRS
- Research4Life
- Science Citation Index

According to the Journal Citation Reports, the journal has a 2016 impact factor of 1.071.
