= George Scripcaru =

Mayor of Braşov

Mayor of Brașov
- In office 2004–2020
- Preceded by: Ioan Ghișe
- Succeeded by: Allen Coliban
- Incumbent
- Assumed office 2024
- Preceded by: Allen Coliban

Personal details
- Born: September 3, 1966 (age 59) Doljești, Neamț County, Romania
- Party: National Liberal Party (since 2024); Independent (2016-2024); National Liberal Party (2014–2016); Democratic Liberal Party (prior to 2014)

George Scripcaru (born September 3, 1966, Doljești, Neamț County) is a Romanian politician and mayor of Brașov. He was the mayor of Brașov between 2004 and 2020, and was elected in 2024 for a new term. In 2011, he was elected as one of the 15 vice-presidents of the Democratic Liberal Party.

He is a graduate of the Faculty of Physical Education and Sport of the West University, Timișoara.

He is married and has one daughter.

== Political activity ==
- 1992–1994: member of Democratic Party (PD), president of the Youth Organisation
- 1994–2000: president of Brașov County Youth Organisation; vice-president of the National Youth Organisation
- 1996–2000: councillor in Brașov Local Council
- 1998–1999: president of APR Brașov
- 2001–2014: president of Brașov County Democratic Liberal Party (PDL) Organisation
- 2004–2020: Mayor of Brașov
- 2024-: Mayor of Brașov
