= Botoșana =

- Commune
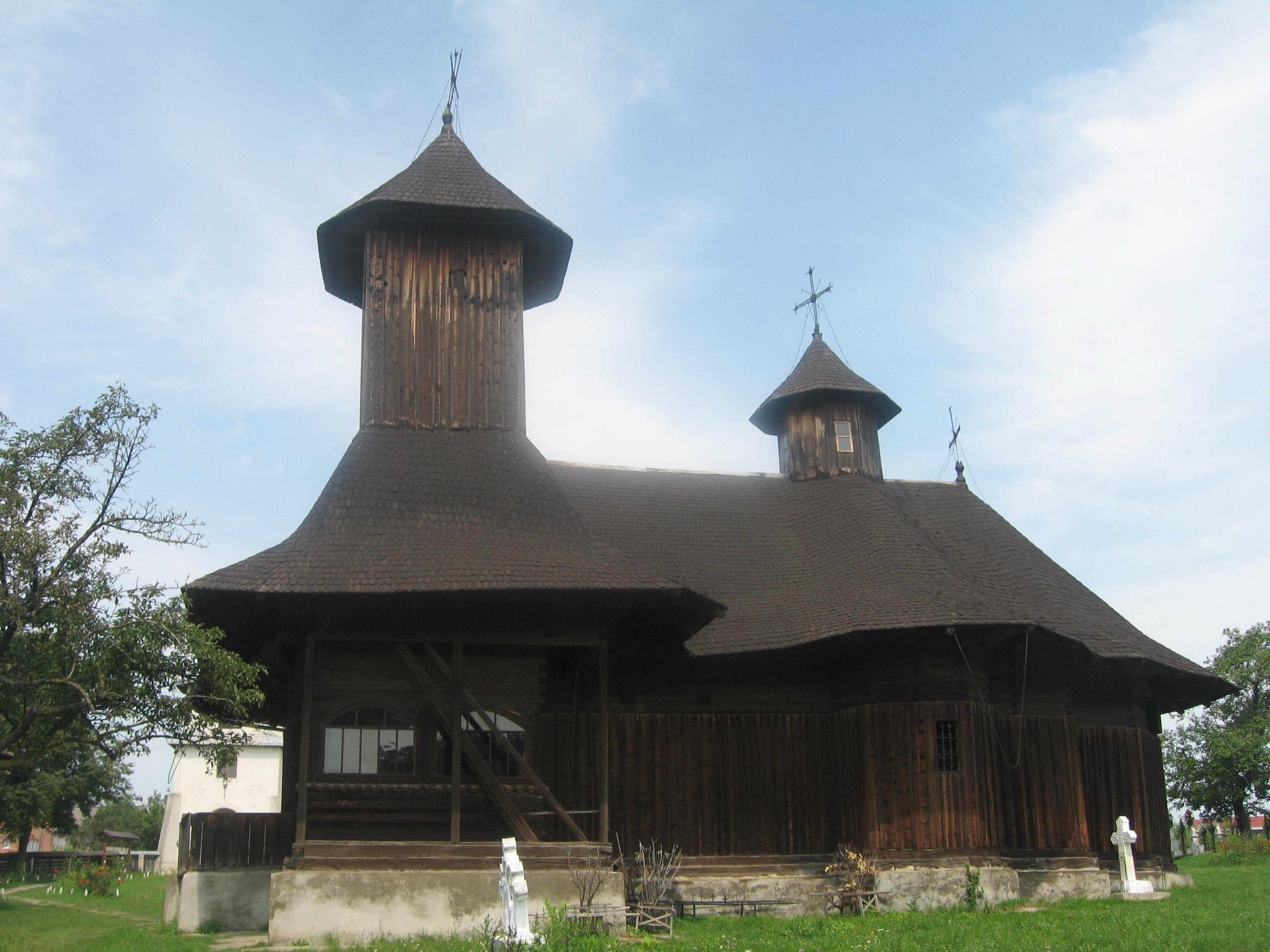
- Wooden church in Botoșana

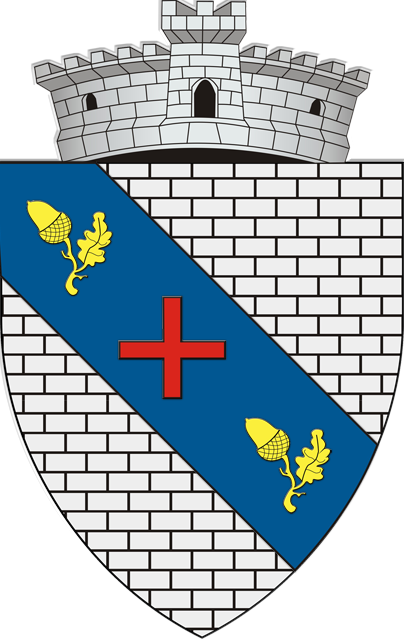
- Coat of arms

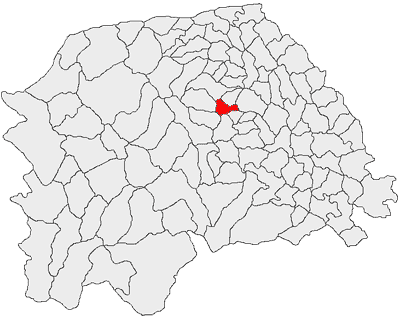
- Location in Suceava County

- Location in Romania
- Coordinates: 47°41′N 25°57′E
- Country: Romania
- County: Suceava

Government
  - Mayor (2020–2024): Ioan Ghiață (PNL)
- Area: 37.48 km^{2} (14.47 sq mi)
- Elevation: 398 m (1,306 ft)
- Population (2021-12-01): 2,292
  - Density: 61.15/km^{2} (158.4/sq mi)
- Time zone: UTC+02:00 (EET)
  - Summer (DST): UTC+03:00 (EEST)
- Postal code: 727050
- Area code: +(40) 230
- Vehicle reg.: SV
- Website: www.comunabotosana.ro

Botoșana (German: Botuschana) is a commune located in Suceava County, Bukovina, northeastern Romania. It is composed of a single village, Botoșana. It also included Comănești and Humoreni villages until 2002, when they were split off to form the Comănești commune.

== Natives ==
- Gheorghe Flutur (born 1960), politician
