= Zvoriștea =

- Commune
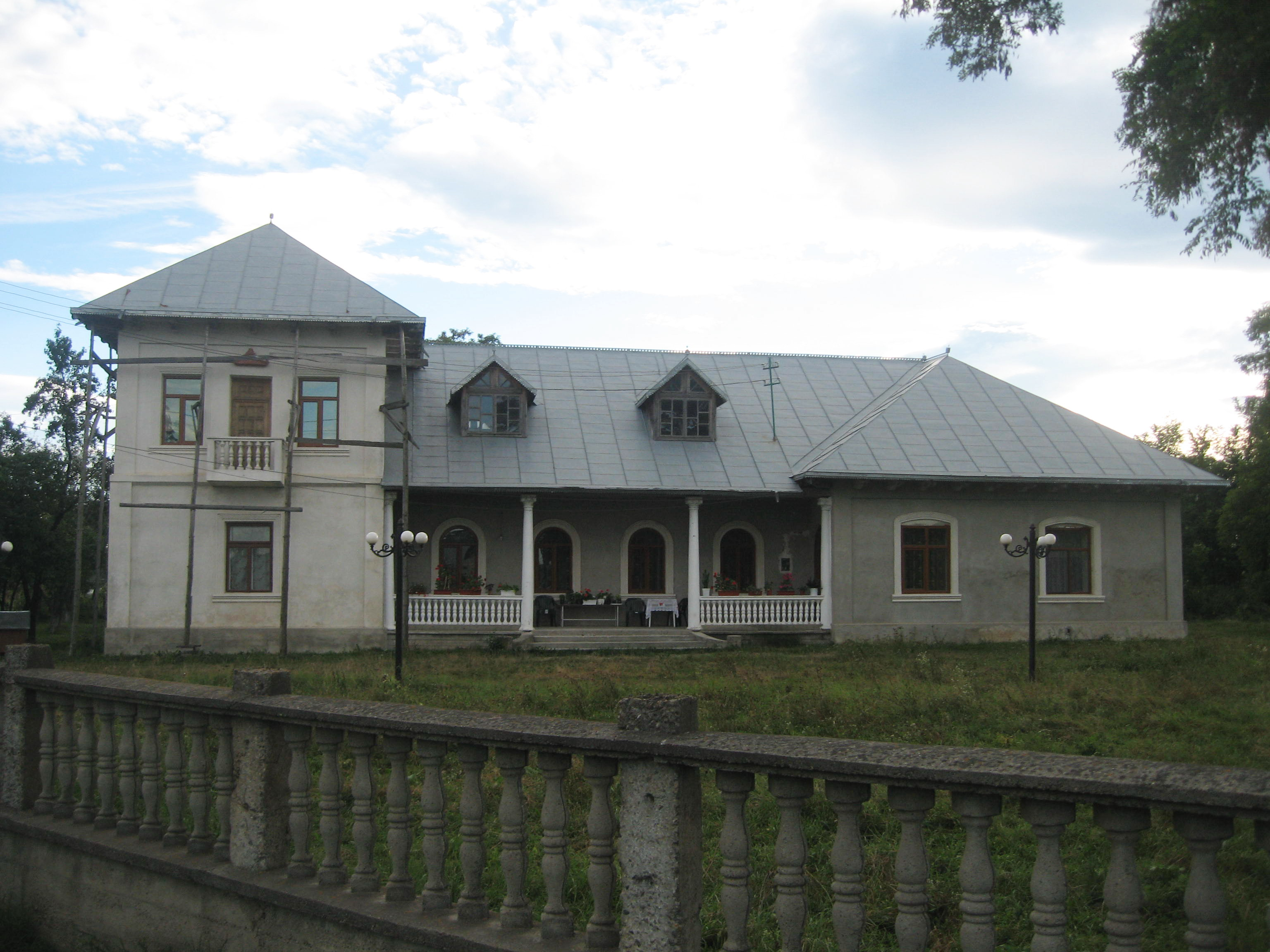
- The manor in Zvoriștea

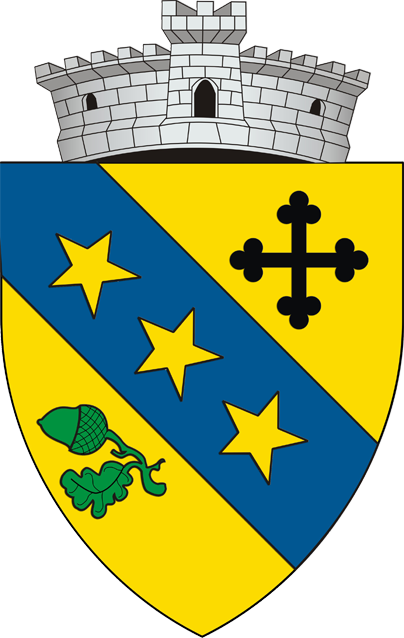
- Coat of arms

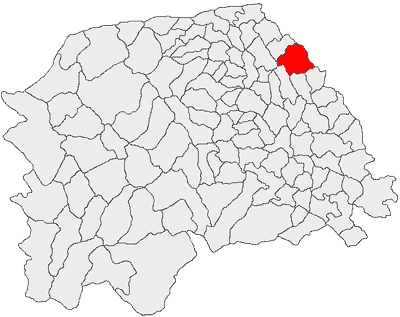
- Location in Suceava County

- Location in Romania
- Coordinates: 47°50′N 26°17′E
- Country: Romania
- County: Suceava

Government
  - Mayor (2020–2024): Constantin Barariu (PSD)
- Area: 65 km^{2} (25 sq mi)
- Elevation: 275 m (902 ft)
- Population (2021-12-01): 5,814
  - Density: 89/km^{2} (230/sq mi)
- Time zone: UTC+02:00 (EET)
  - Summer (DST): UTC+03:00 (EEST)
- Postal code: 727640
- Area code: +40 230
- Vehicle reg.: SV
- Website: primaria-zvoristea.ro

Zvoriștea is a commune located in Suceava County, Western Moldavia, northeastern Romania. It is composed of eight villages, namely: Buda, Dealu, Poiana, Slobozia, Stânca, Stâncuța, Șerbănești, and Zvoriștea.

== Natives ==
- Dan Lupașcu (born 1962), jurist and professor
- Elena Murariu (born 1963), painter and iconograph
