= Calafindești =

- Commune
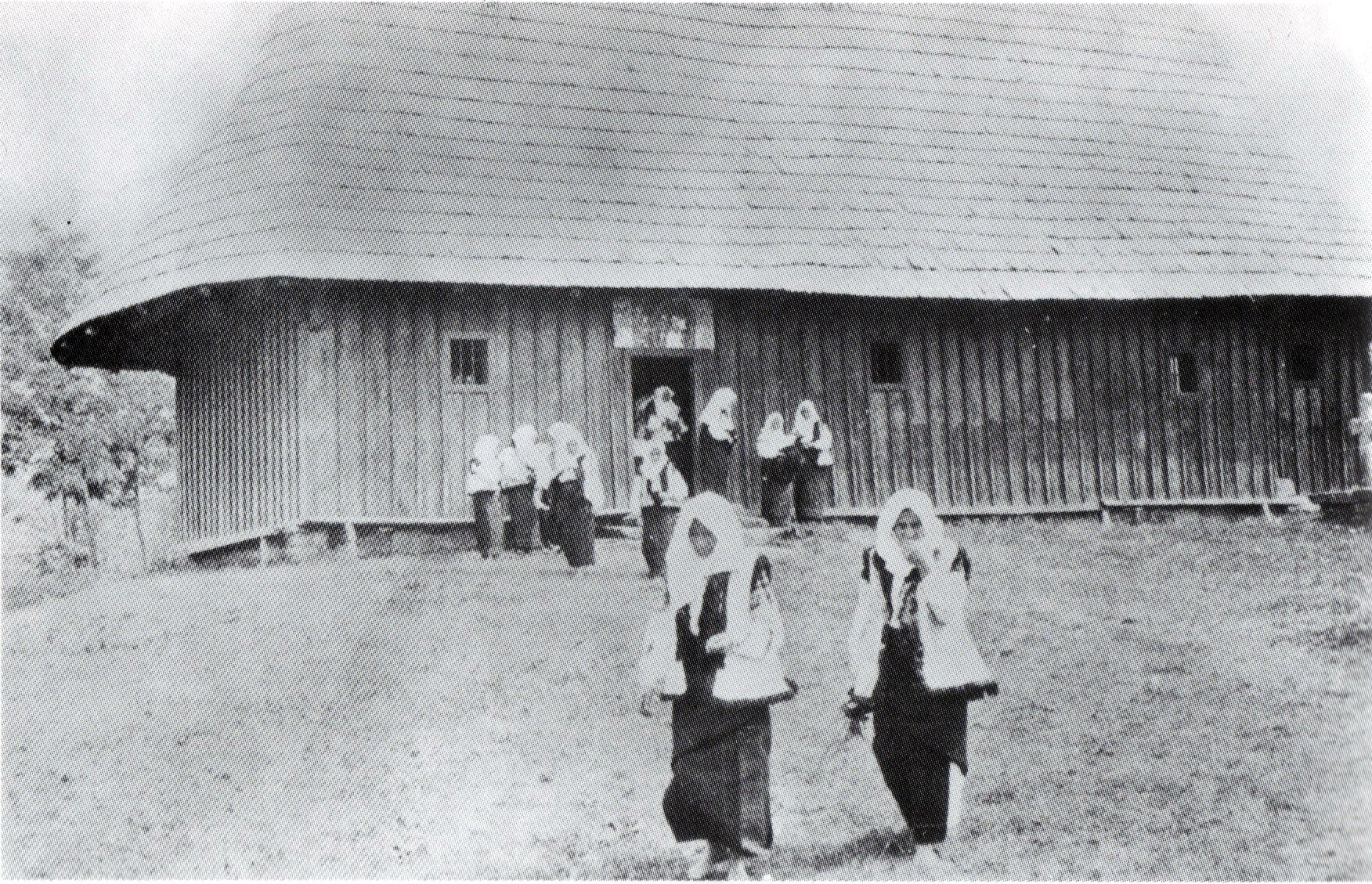

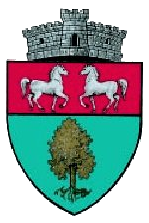
- Coat of arms

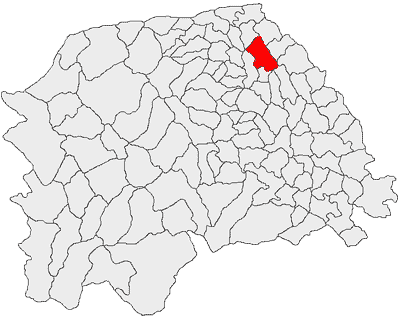
- Location in Suceava County

- Location in Romania
- Coordinates: 47°52′N 26°7′E
- Country: Romania
- County: Suceava
- Subdivisions: Calafindești, Botoșanița Mare

Government
  - Mayor (2024–2028): Adrian Frîncu (PNL)
- Area: 24 km^{2} (9.3 sq mi)
- Elevation: 409 m (1,342 ft)
- Population (2021-12-01): 2,699
  - Density: 110/km^{2} (290/sq mi)
- Time zone: UTC+02:00 (EET)
  - Summer (DST): UTC+03:00 (EEST)
- Postal code: 727105
- Area code: +40 x30
- Vehicle reg.: SV
- Website: www.comunacalafindesti.ro

Calafindești (German: Kalafindestie) is a commune located in Suceava County, in the historical region of Bukovina, northeastern Romania. It is composed of two villages, Botoșanița Mare and Calafindești.

The closest cities are Siret (12 km), Rădăuți (15 km), and Suceava (25 km).
