= Boghicea =

- Commune
- Location in Neamț County

- Location in Romania
- Coordinates: 47°4′N 27°4′E
- Country: Romania
- County: Neamț

Government
  - Mayor (2020–2024): Mihai Cazamir (PSD)
- Area: 39.39 km^{2} (15.21 sq mi)
- Elevation: 258 m (846 ft)
- Population (2021-12-01): 2,102
  - Density: 53.36/km^{2} (138.2/sq mi)
- Time zone: UTC+02:00 (EET)
  - Summer (DST): UTC+03:00 (EEST)
- Postal code: 617031
- Area code: +(40) 233
- Vehicle reg.: NT
- Website: comunaboghicea.ro

Boghicea is a commune in Neamț County, Western Moldavia, Romania. It is composed of four villages: Boghicea, Căușeni, Nistria, and Slobozia.

The commune is located in the eastern part of Neamț County, 72 km (45 mi) from the county seat, Piatra Neamț, on the border with Iași County.

Boghicea village was founded by a monk named Boghiță who had a small hermitage in the forest and sheltered other citizens. In 1784, Gheorghe Stroescu and his wife Adela began construction on a stone and brick church on their estate with their own finances.

In August 1944, during the Second Jassy–Kishinev offensive, the village was the site of a tank battle where the Romanians led by Lt. Ion S. Dumitru repulsed Soviet forces, causing heavy casualties.

Historical population
Year	Pop.	±%
2002	2,537	—
2011	2,376	−6.3%
2021	2,102	−11.5%
Source: Census data
