= Cherepkivtsi =

Village in Chernivtsi Oblast, Ukraine

Cherepkivtsi Черепківці Cerepcăuți Черепковцы
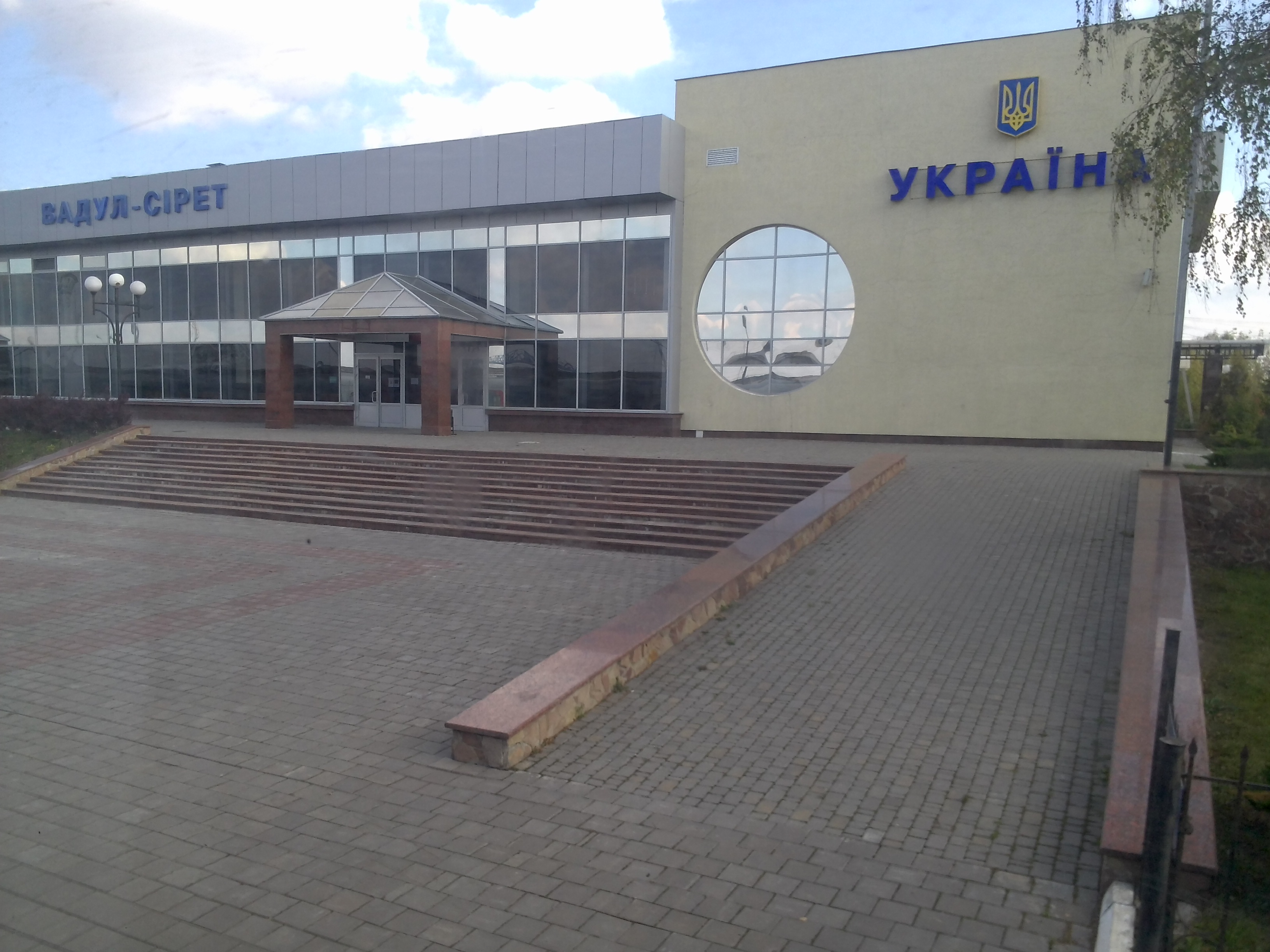
- The Vadul-Siret railway station in Cherepkivtsi (2012)
- Interactive map of Cherepkivtsi
- Location within Chernivtsi Oblast Location within Ukraine
- Coordinates: 48°01′05″N 25°57′53″E
- Country: Ukraine
- Oblast: Chernivtsi Oblast
- Raion: Chernivtsi Raion
- Elevation: 314 m (1,030 ft)

Population
  - Total: 2,082
- Time zone: UTC+2 (EET)
  - Summer (DST): UTC+3 (EEST)
- Postal code: 60444
- Area code: +380 3734
- KOATUU: 7321088201

Cherepkivtsi (Ukrainian: Черепківці; Romanian: Cerepcăuți; German: Czerepkoutz) is a village in Chernivtsi Raion, Chernivtsi Oblast, Ukraine. It belongs to Hlyboka settlement hromada, one of the hromadas of Ukraine. Population: 9,376 (2020 est.)

Until 18 July 2020, Cherepkivtsi belonged to Hlyboka Raion. The raion was abolished in July 2020 as part of the administrative reform of Ukraine, which reduced the number of raions of Chernivtsi Oblast to three. The area of Hlyboka Raion was merged into Chernivtsi Raion.
