= Todirești, Suceava =

Todirești
- Commune
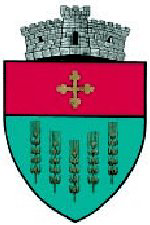
- Coat of arms

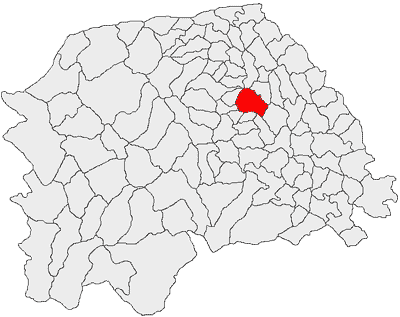
- Location in Suceava County

- Location in Romania
- Coordinates: 47°42′N 26°2′E
- Country: Romania
- County: Suceava
- Subdivisions: Todirești, Costâna, Părhăuți, Sârghiești, Soloneț

Government
  - Mayor (2024–2028): Mugurel Bocancea (PNL)
- Area: 59 km^{2} (23 sq mi)
- Elevation: 350 m (1,150 ft)
- Population (2021-12-01): 4,810
  - Density: 82/km^{2} (210/sq mi)
- Time zone: UTC+02:00 (EET)
  - Summer (DST): UTC+03:00 (EEST)
- Postal code: 727530
- Area code: (+40) x30
- Vehicle reg.: SV
- Website: todiresti-suceava.ro

Todirești (German: Theodorestie) is a commune located in Suceava County, Bukovina, northeastern Romania. It is composed of five villages: Costâna (German: Kostina), Părhăuți (German: Parhoutz), Sârghieşti, Soloneț (German: Solonetz vel Krasna), and Todirești.

== Politics and local administration ==
=== Communal council ===
The commune's current local council has the following political composition, according to the results of the 2020 Romanian local elections:

Party	Seats	Current Council
National Liberal Party (PNL)	6	
Social Democratic Party (PSD)	4	
Green Party (PV)	3	
PRO Romania (PRO)	3	
