= Doljești =

- Commune
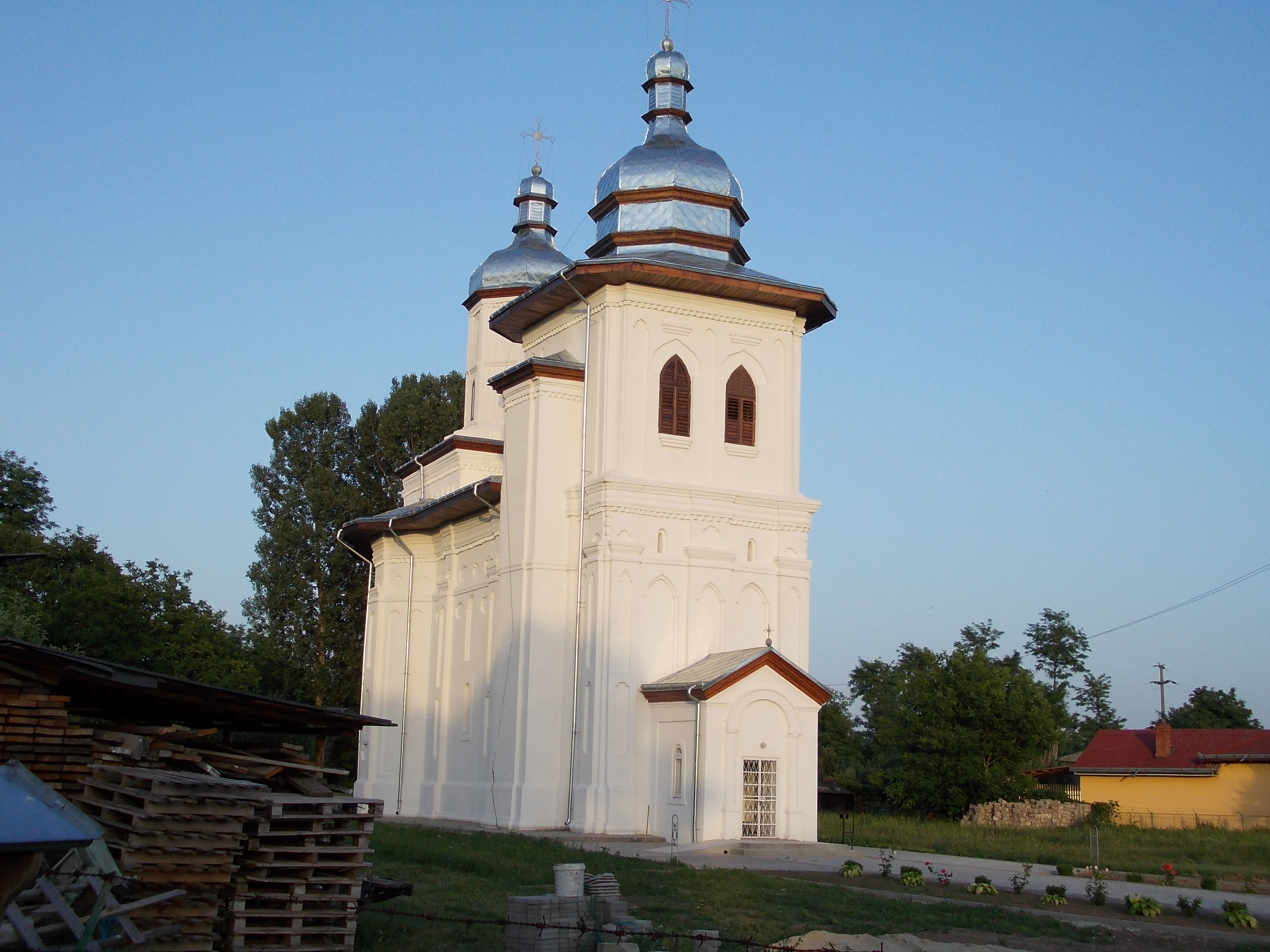
- Holy Trinity Church in Doljești

- Location in Neamț County

- Location in Romania
- Coordinates: 47°2′N 26°59′E
- Country: Romania
- County: Neamț

Government
  - Mayor (2020–2024): Albert Lungu (PNL)
- Area: 36.5 km^{2} (14.1 sq mi)
- Elevation: 217 m (712 ft)
- Population (2021-12-01): 5,735
  - Density: 157/km^{2} (407/sq mi)
- Time zone: UTC+02:00 (EET)
  - Summer (DST): UTC+03:00 (EEST)
- Postal code: 617160
- Area code: +(40) 233
- Vehicle reg.: NT
- Website: primariadoljesti.ro

Doljești is a commune in Neamț County, Western Moldavia, Romania. It is composed of four villages: Buhonca, Buruienești, Doljești, and Rotunda.

Historical population
Year	Pop.	±%
1992	6,646	—
2002	7,296	+9.8%
2011	7,220	−1.0%
2021	5,735	−20.6%
Source: Census data

== Natives ==
- George Scripcaru (born 1966), politician, mayor of Brașov from 2004 to 2020
