= Allen Coliban =

Romanian curler and politician

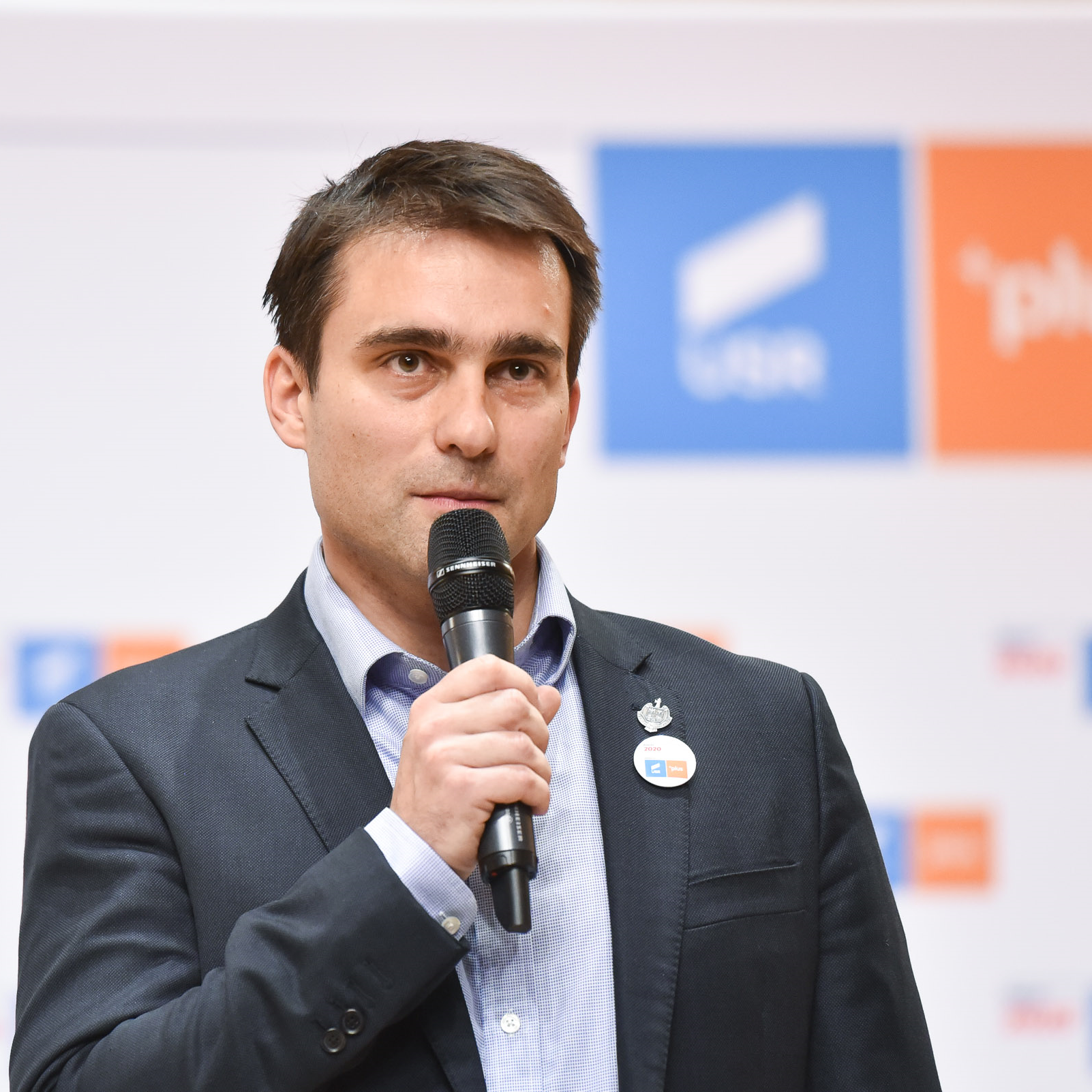

Member of the Chamber of Deputies
- Incumbent
- Assumed office 21 December 2024
- Constituency: Brașov

Mayor of Brașov
- In office 29 October 2020 – 21 October 2024
- Preceded by: George Scripcaru
- Succeeded by: George Scripcaru

Senator of Romania
- In office 20 December 2016 – 28 October 2020
- Constituency: Brașov

Personal details
- Born: 3 June 1979 (age 46) Brașov, Romania
- Citizenship: Romania
- Party: USR
- Occupation: Politician

Allen Coliban (born 3 June 1979) is a Romanian curler, politician and member of the Chamber of Deputies since 2024. He is a member of the Save Romania Union (USR). He served as the mayor of Brașov between 2020 and 2024. Prior to becoming mayor, he was a senator from 2016 to 2020. He is also vice-president of Save Romania Union (USR).

== Electoral history ==
=== Mayor of Brașov ===
Election	Affiliation	Main round		
Election	Affiliation	Votes	Percentage	Position
2020	USR PLUS	34,870	42.06%	1st
2024	ADU (additionally supported by FDGR)	47,797	43.72%	2nd
