= Liteni =

- Town
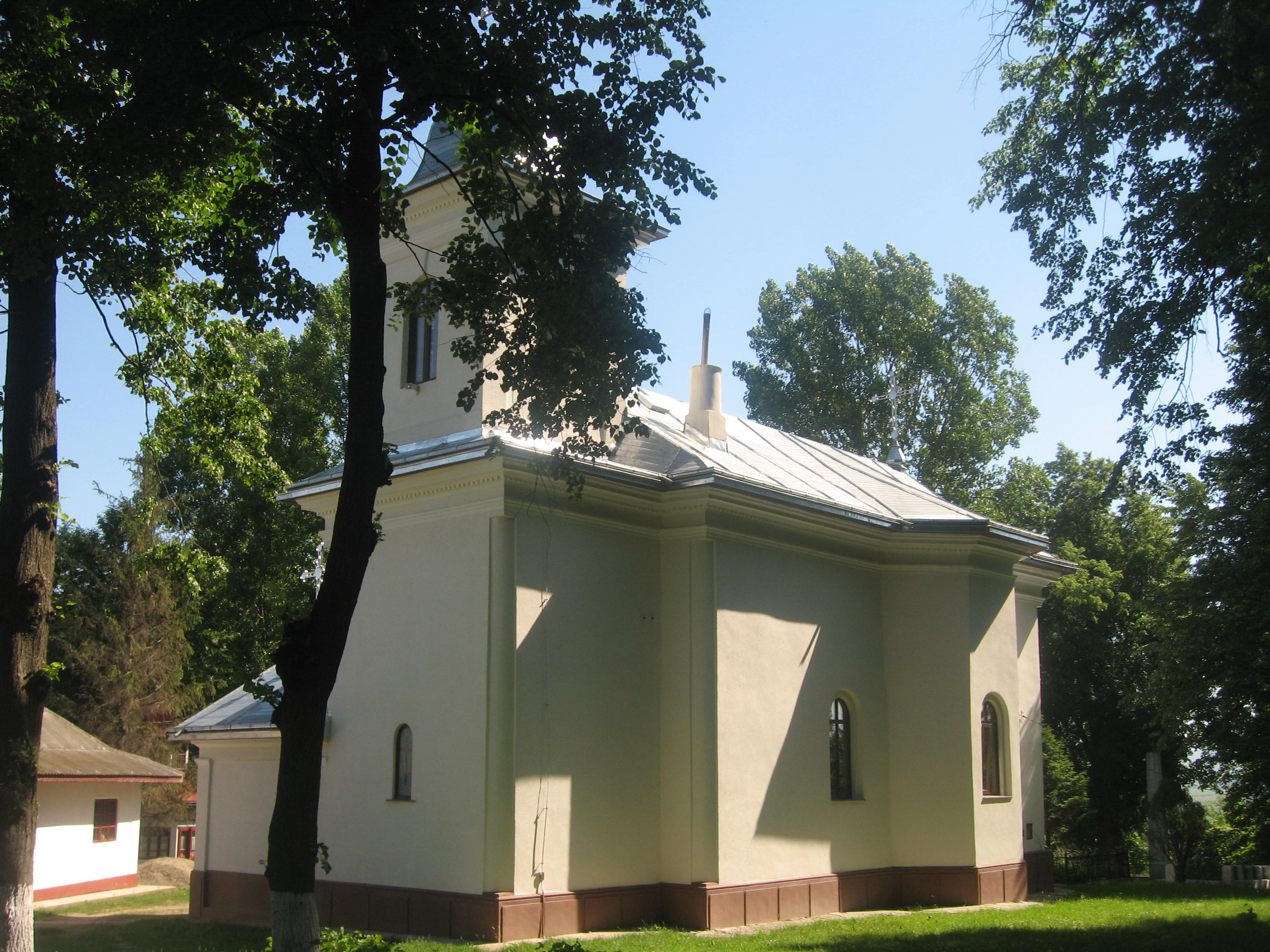
- St. Nicholas church in Liteni

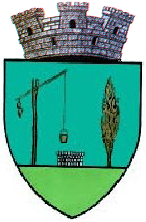
- Coat of arms

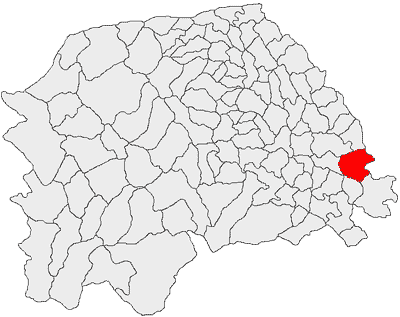
- Location in Suceava County

- Location in Romania
- Coordinates: 47°31′12″N 26°31′55″E
- Country: Romania
- County: Suceava

Government
  - Mayor (2024–2028): Tomiță Onisii (PNL)
- Area: 72.63 km^{2} (28.04 sq mi)
- Elevation: 235 m (771 ft)
- Population (2021-12-01): 8,878
  - Density: 122.2/km^{2} (316.6/sq mi)
- Time zone: UTC+02:00 (EET)
  - Summer (DST): UTC+03:00 (EEST)
- Postal code: 727335
- Area code: (+40) 02 30
- Vehicle reg.: SV
- Website: www.primarialiteni.ro

Liteni (German: Leiten) is a town in Suceava County, northeastern Romania. It is situated in the historical region of Western Moldavia. Liteni is the ninth-largest urban settlement in the county, with a population of 8,878 inhabitants, according to the 2021 census. It was declared a town in 2004, along with seven other localities in Suceava County. The town administers five villages: Corni, Roșcani, Rotunda, Siliștea, and Vercicani.

Historical population
Year	Pop.	±%
2002	9,851	—
2011	9,398	−4.6%
2022	8,878	−5.5%
Source: Official Romanian census data

Liteni is located in the south-eastern part of Suceava County, near the confluence of the Suceava River and the Siret River. The town of Dolhasca is nearby. Despite being a town, Liteni has a rural aspect in many areas and the main occupation of its inhabitants is agriculture.

== Administration and local politics ==
=== Town council ===
The town's current local council has the following political composition, according to the results of the 2020 Romanian local elections:

Party	Seats	Current Council
National Liberal Party (PNL)	11	
Social Democratic Party (PSD)	3	
People's Movement Party (PMP)	2	
Independent (Ceornei Gheorghe)	1	

== Natives ==
- Acsinte Gaspar (1937–2025), judge and politician
