= Comănești, Suceava =

Comănești
- Commune
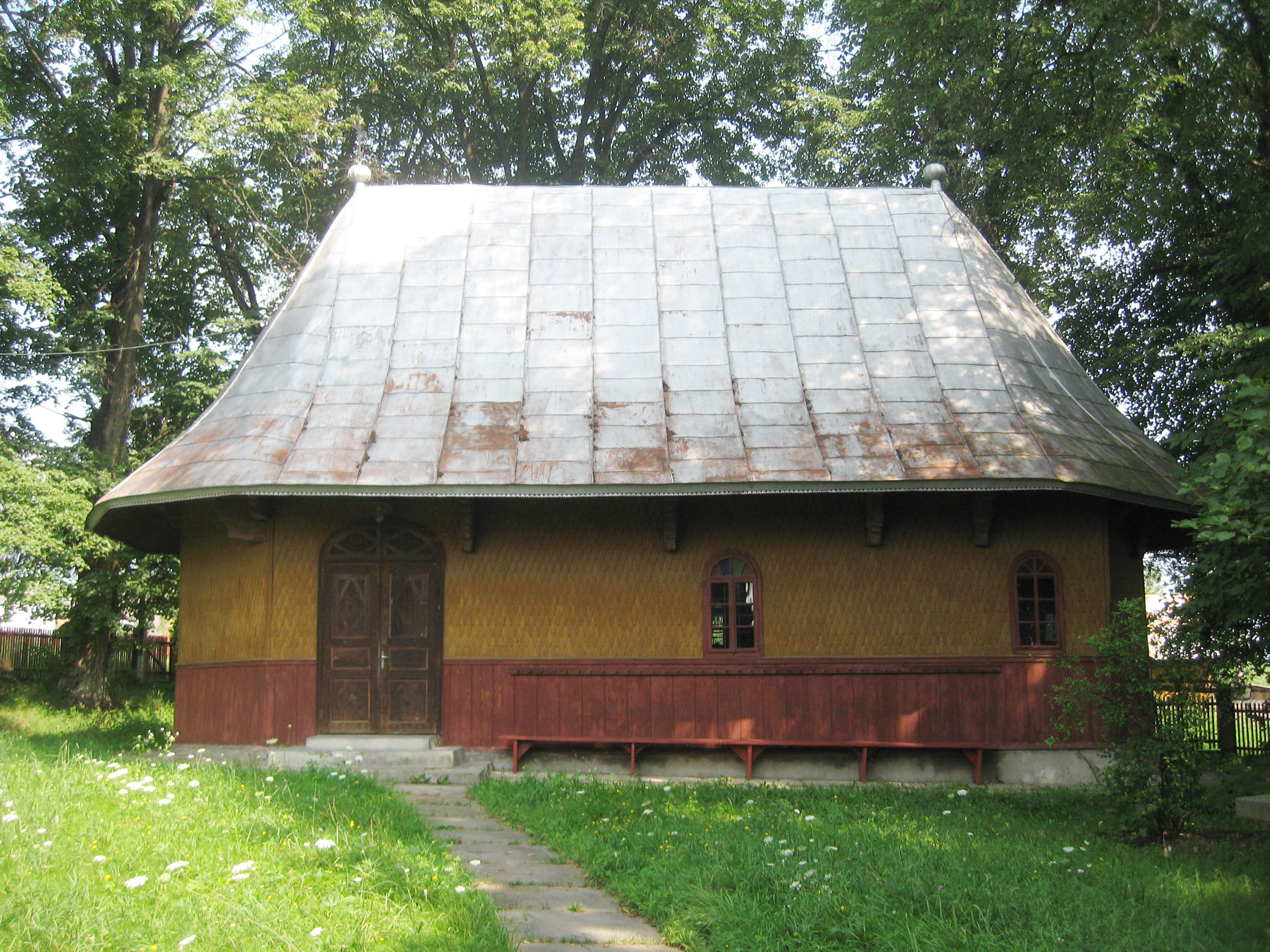

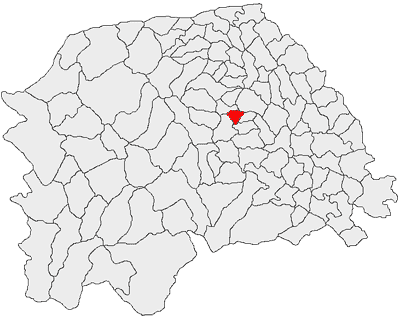
- Location in Suceava County

- Location in Romania
- Coordinates: 47°40′N 25°59′E
- Country: Romania
- County: Suceava
- Subdivisions: Comănești, Humoreni

Government
  - Mayor (2024–2028): Grigoraș Păstrăv (PNL)
- Population (2021-12-01): 2,202
- Time zone: UTC+02:00 (EET)
  - Summer (DST): UTC+03:00 (EEST)
- Postal code: 727135
- Area code: +40 x30
- Vehicle reg.: SV
- Website: www.comunacomanesti.ro

Comănești (German: Komanestie) is a commune located in Suceava County, in the historical region of Bukovina, northeastern Romania. It is composed of two villages, more specifically Comănești and Humoreni (German: Ludihumora). These were part of Botoșana commune until 2002, when they were split off.

== Administration and local politics ==
=== Communal council ===
The commune's current local council has the following political composition, according to the results of the 2020 Romanian local elections:

| Party | Seats | Current Council |
|---|---|---|
| National Liberal Party (PNL) | 7 | |
| Social Democratic Party (PSD) | 1 | |
| People's Movement Party (PMP) | 1 | |
| PRO Romania (PRO) | 1 | |
| Asociația pentru Democrație Educație Respect (ADER) | 1 | |
