= Grămești =

- Commune
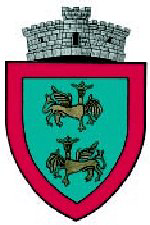
- Coat of arms

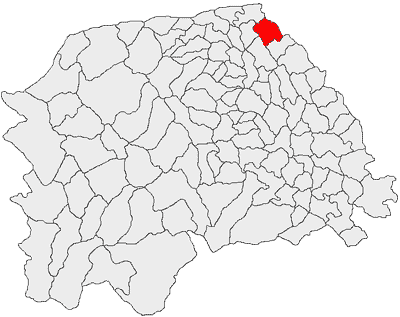
- Location in Suceava County

- Location in Romania
- Coordinates: 47°55′N 26°9′E
- Country: Romania
- County: Suceava
- Subdivisions: Grămești, Bălinești, Botoșanița Mică, Rudești, Verbia

Government
  - Mayor (2024–2028): Florina-Veronica Anechitei (PNL)
- Area: 33 km^{2} (13 sq mi)
- Elevation: 293 m (961 ft)
- Population (2021-12-01): 2,756
  - Density: 84/km^{2} (220/sq mi)
- Time zone: EET/EEST (UTC+2/+3)
- Postal code: 727285
- Area code: (+40) x30
- Vehicle reg.: SV
- Website: www.comunagramesti.ro

Grămești is a commune located in Suceava County, Western Moldavia, Romania. It is composed of five villages: Bălinești, Botoșanița Mică, Grămești, Rudești and Verbia.
