= Kamianka, Chernivtsi Oblast =

Rural locality in Chernivtsi Oblast, Ukraine

Kamianka Кам'янка Petriceni • Camenca (in Romanian)
- Village
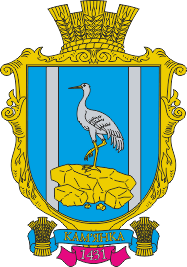
- Coat of arms
- Interactive map of Kamianka
- Location in Chernivtsi Oblast Location in Ukraine
- Coordinates: 48°01′34″N 25°54′13″E
- Country: Ukraine
- Oblast: Chernivtsi Oblast
- Raion: Chernivtsi Raion
- Hromada: Kamianka rural hromada
- Elevation: 348 m (1,142 ft)

Population (2018)
  - Total: 6,284
- Time zone: UTC+2 (EET)
  - Summer (DST): UTC+3 (EEST)
- Postal code: 60427
- Area code: +380 3734

Kamianka (Ukrainian: Камянка; Romanian: Petriceni or Camenca, German: Kamenka) is a village in Chernivtsi Raion, Chernivtsi Oblast, Ukraine. It hosts the administration of Kamianka rural hromada, one of the hromadas of Ukraine.

Until 18 July 2020, Kamianka belonged to Hlyboka Raion. The raion was abolished in July 2020 as part of the administrative reform of Ukraine, which reduced the number of raions of Chernivtsi Oblast to three. The area of Hlyboka Raion was merged into Chernivtsi Raion.
