= Bivolari =

- Commune
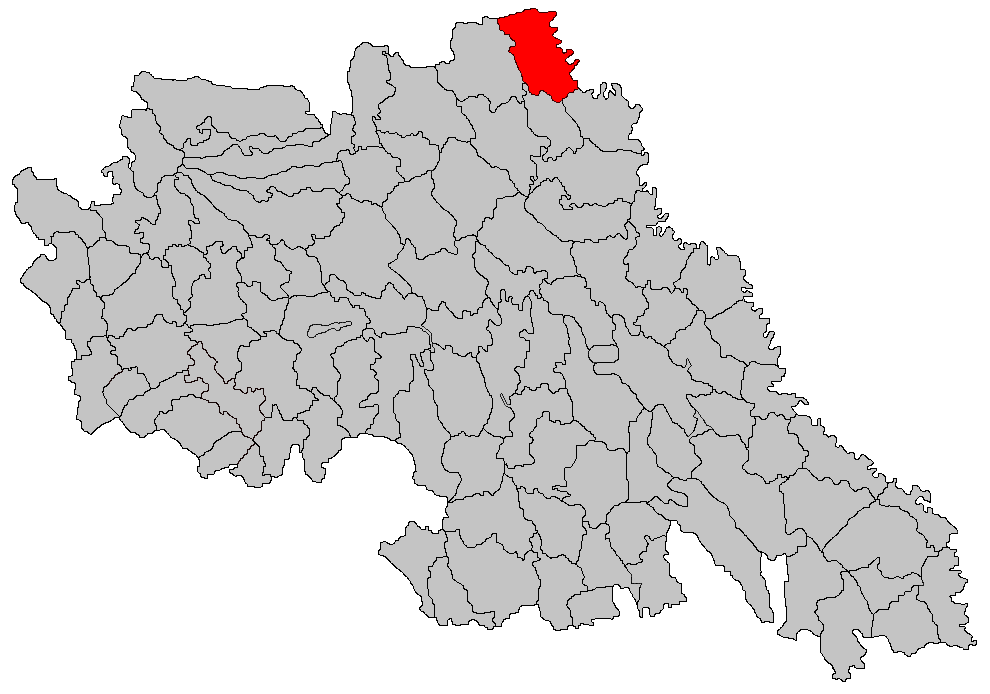
- Location in Iași County

- Location in Romania
- Coordinates: 47°31′N 27°27′E
- Country: Romania
- County: Iași
- Subdivisions: Bivolari, Buruienești, Soloneț, Tabăra, Traian

Government
  - Mayor (2024–2028): Dumitru-Liviu Teodorescu (PSD)
- Area: 69 km^{2} (27 sq mi)
- Elevation: 57 m (187 ft)
- Population (2021-12-01): 3,369
  - Density: 49/km^{2} (130/sq mi)
- Time zone: EET/EEST (UTC+2/+3)
- Postal code: 707055
- Area code: +40 x32
- Vehicle reg.: IS
- Website: comunabivolari.ro

Bivolari is a commune in Iași County, Western Moldavia, Romania. It is composed of five villages: Bivolari, Buruienești, Soloneț, Tabăra and Traian.

== Natives ==
- Vlad Neculau
- Alexandru Tzaicu
