= Slătioara =

Slătioara may refer to several places in Romania:

- Slătioara, Olt, a commune in Olt County
- Slătioara, Vâlcea, a commune in Vâlcea County
- Slătioara, a village in Strâmtura Commune, Maramureș County
- Slătioara, a village in Râșca Commune, Suceava County
- Slătioara, a village in Stulpicani Commune, Suceava County
- Slătioara, a tributary of the Gemenea in Suceava County
- Slătioara (Iza), a tributary of the Iza in Maramureș County
- Slătioara, a tributary of the Târzia in Neamț County
