= Suha (river) =

- Location within Romania

Location
- Country: Romania
- Counties: Suceava County
- Towns: Frasin

Physical characteristics
- Source: Stânișoara Mountains
- Mouth: Moldova
  - location: Frasin
  - coordinates: 47.5442°N 25.8029°E
- Length: 34 km (21 mi)
- Basin size: 356 km^{2} (137 sq mi)

Basin features
- Progression: Moldova→ Siret→ Danube→ Black Sea

The Suha is a right tributary of the river Moldova in Romania. It discharges into the Moldova in Frasin. It flows through the villages Ostra, Tărnicioara, Stulpicani, Plutonița, Doroteia and the town Frasin. Its length is 34 km (21 mi) and its basin size is 356 km^{2} (137 sq mi).

== Tributaries ==
The following rivers are tributaries to the river Suha:

- Left: Brăteasa, Botușan, Muncel, Gemenea, Ursoaia, Valea Seacă
- Right: Negrileasa, Braniștea
