= Kompánek =

Kompánek may refer to:

- Vladimír Kompánek (1927–2011), Slovak composer
- Sonny Kompánek, composer and conductor (e.g. see Gone till November)
