= Negrileasa =

- Location within Romania

Location
- Country: Romania
- Counties: Suceava County
- Villages: Vadu Negrilesei, Negrileasa

Physical characteristics
- Source: Stânișoara Mountains
- Mouth: Suha
  - location: near Stulpicani
  - coordinates: 47.4629°N 25.7721°E
- Length: 21 km (13 mi)
- Basin size: 79 km^{2} (31 sq mi)

Basin features
- Progression: Suha→ Moldova→ Siret→ Danube→ Black Sea

The Negrileasa is a right tributary of the river Suha in Romania. It flows into the Suha near Stulpicani. Its length is 21 km (13 mi) and its basin size is 79 km^{2} (31 sq mi).
