= Mihai Pop =

Romanian ethnologist

Mihai Pop (November 18, 1907 – October 8, 2000) was a Romanian ethnologist. He won the Herder Prize in 1967. Notable works include Obiceiuri tradiţionale româneşti (1978) and Folclor românesc (1998). He was a member of the Romanian Academy.

== Biography ==
Pop was born in Glod village in what is now the commune of Strâmtura in Maramureș County in northern Romania (then part of Austria-Hungary), the son of a Greek-Catholic priest. He pursued studies in a Hungarian high school in Sighetu Marmației led by Piarist monks. After the First World War, he came to Bucharest. There, he pursued studies in literature and philosophy (1925–1929), followed by Slavonic studies (1929–1934) in Prague, Bonn and Warsaw, and obtained a Ph.D. in philology from the University of Bratislava. He later taught philological sciences at the University of Bucharest, being assistant professor (1936–1939) in the Romanian Literature Department led by Dumitru Caracostea. He was a member of the Sociological Research Group and of the Romanian Social Institute (ISR), led by Dimitrie Gusti (1929–1936).

During World War II, Pop was appointed to the Romanian Embassy in Bratislava between 1941 and 1944. From 1949, he joined the Folklore Institute of Bucharest, becoming its first coordinator of scientific activity (1949–1954), then as deputy director (1954–1965) and later as director (1965–1974).

He returned to the University of Bucharest in 1957, and was professor (1957–1962) and then professor of folklore (1962–1975) in its Faculty of Romanian language and literature. He was head of the department of old Romanian literature and folklore there (1968–1972). Pop was a recipient of the Herder Prize in 1967, also given to that year to Polish composer Witold Lutosławski, and Slovak sculptor Vladimír Kompánek.

In 1975 he retired on pension, leaving his position as Consultant Professor at the Department of Ethnology and Folklore, University of Bucharest.

He held the offices as President of the International Society for Ethnology and Folklore (1971), as well as other numerous foreign scientific societies. He was visiting professor at major universities in Marburg, Germany, Berkeley and Ann Arbor (United States) and Paris, France.

He died in Bucharest on October 8, 2000.

== Bibliography ==
- Dicţionarul etnologilor români, vol. II, Iordan Datcu, Ed. Saeculum IO, București, 1998, pag. 161.
