= Herder Prize =

Annual international prize awarded from 1964 to 2006

The Herder Prize (German: Gottfried-von-Herder-Preis), named after the German philosopher Johann Gottfried Herder (1744–1803), was a prestigious international prize awarded every year from 1964 to 2006 to scholars and artists from Central and Southeast Europe whose life and work have contributed to the cultural understanding of European countries and their peaceful interrelations. Established in 1963, the first prizes were awarded in 1964. In 2007, the prize was discontinued and was merged into the KAIROS Prize.

== History ==
The prize jury was composed of German and Austrian universities. Financing for the Prize, which amounted to €15,000, was sponsored by the Alfred Toepfer Foundation based in Hamburg. The awards were traditionally presented in an annual ceremony at the University of Vienna and handed over by the President of Austria. Each prize also included a one-year scholarship at an Austrian university given to a young person nominated by the winning scholar.

The prize was open to humanities scholars and artists from a wide variety of fields, including ethnographers, writers, architects, composers, poets, folklorists, painters, historians, literary scholars, art historians, archeologists, theatre directors, musicologists, museologists, linguists, playwrights, etc. Several writers who received the Herder Prize went on to later win the Nobel Prize in Literature, such as Wisława Szymborska (in 1995 and 1996), Imre Kertész (in 2000 and 2002), and Svetlana Alexievich (in 1999 and 2015), and many other recipients received other international accolades and were members of their national academies.

Since its inception the prize was open to scholars and artists from seven central and southeast, mostly communist, European countries (Bulgaria, Czechoslovakia, Greece, Hungary, Poland, Romania and Yugoslavia). After the fall of communism in Europe in the late 1980s and the subsequent turmoil which led to the breakup of Yugoslavia, the dissolution of the Soviet Union and the dissolution of Czechoslovakia, scholars from all the succeeding countries remained eligible for the prize. In the early 1990s several ex-Soviet European countries (the Baltic nations of Estonia, Latvia, and Lithuania; Belarus, and Ukraine) as well as Albania were also made eligible.

Usually seven recipients would be announced every year, except in 1964 (four), 1977 (eight), 1993 (nine), and in 2006 (five) — which was also the last edition of the Herder Prize. In 2007 the prize was discontinued and merged with other prize funds sponsored by the Alfred Toepfer Foundation to create a new Europe-wide annual award, the KAIROS Prize, worth €75,000 and given to a single artist every year to encourage their innovative work.

== List of recipients ==
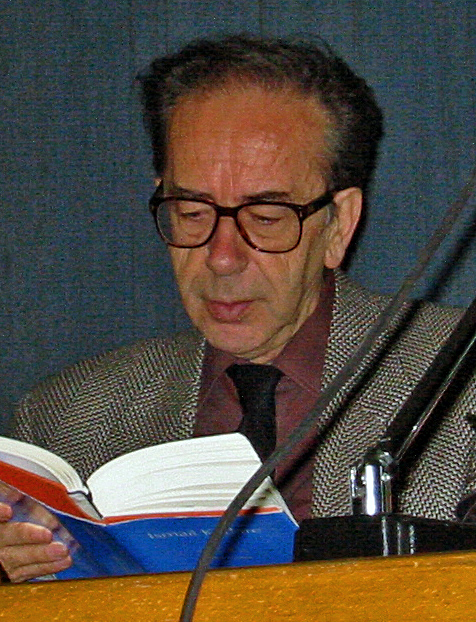
Ismail Kadare

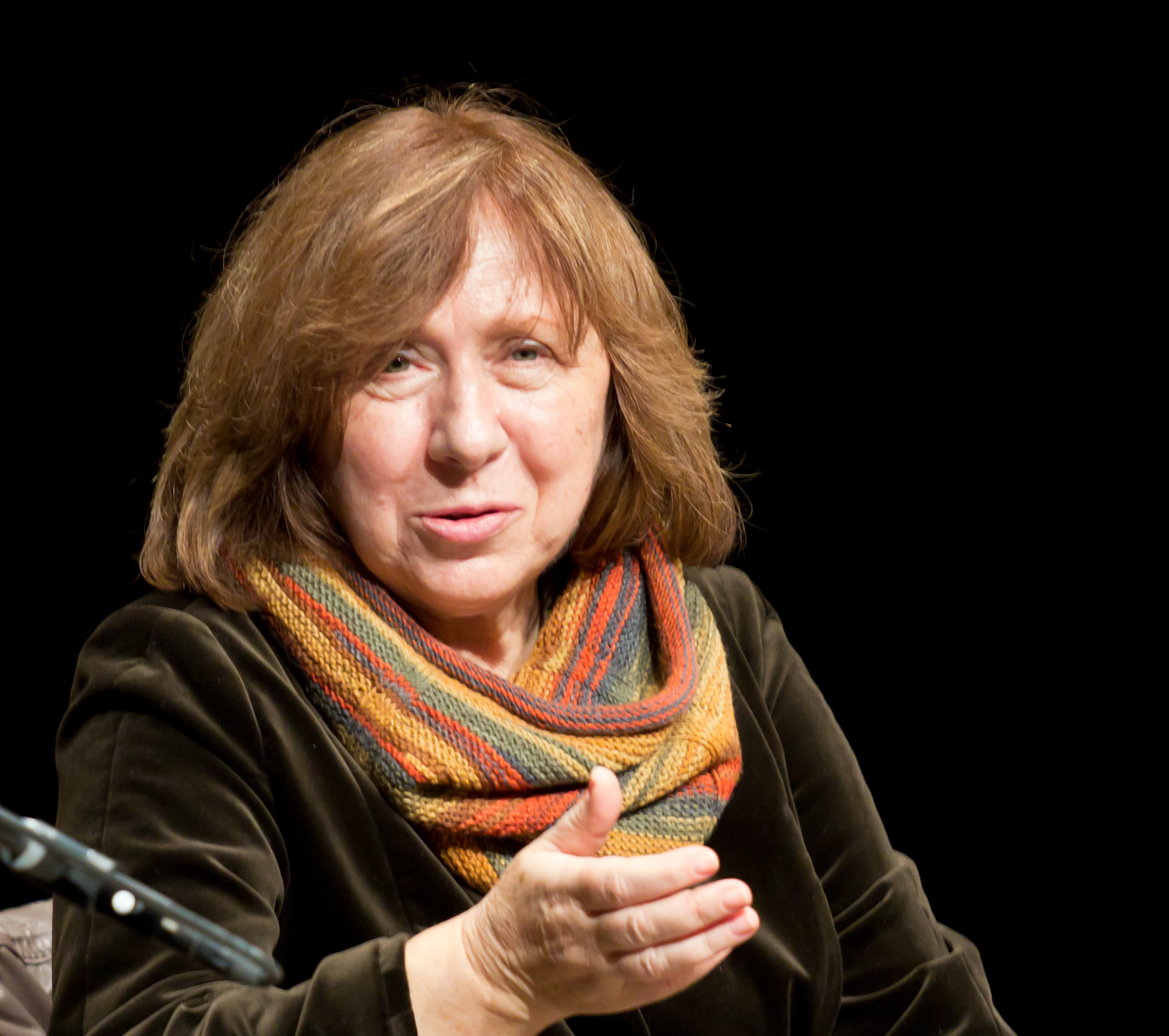
Svetlana Alexievich

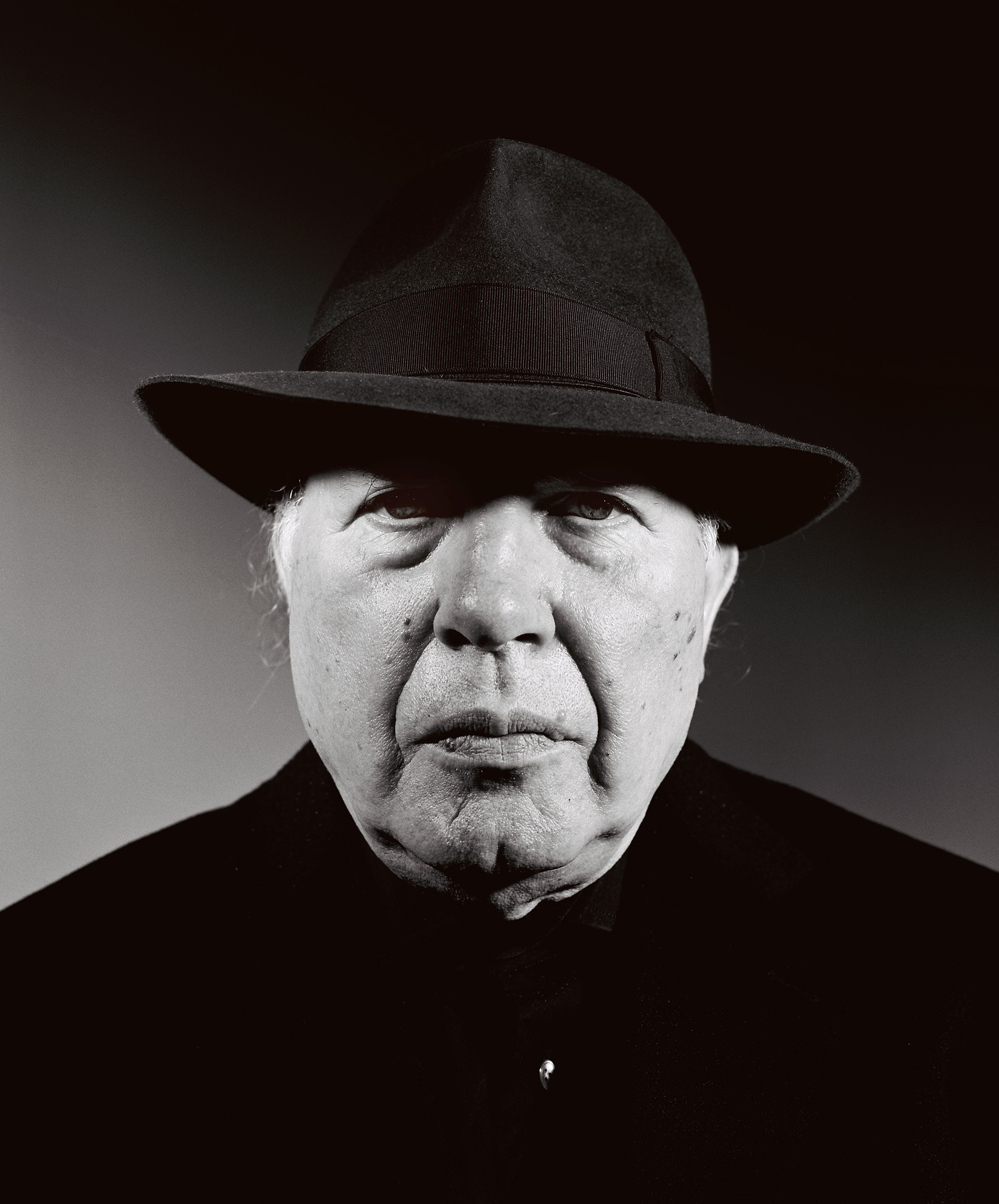
Imre Kertész

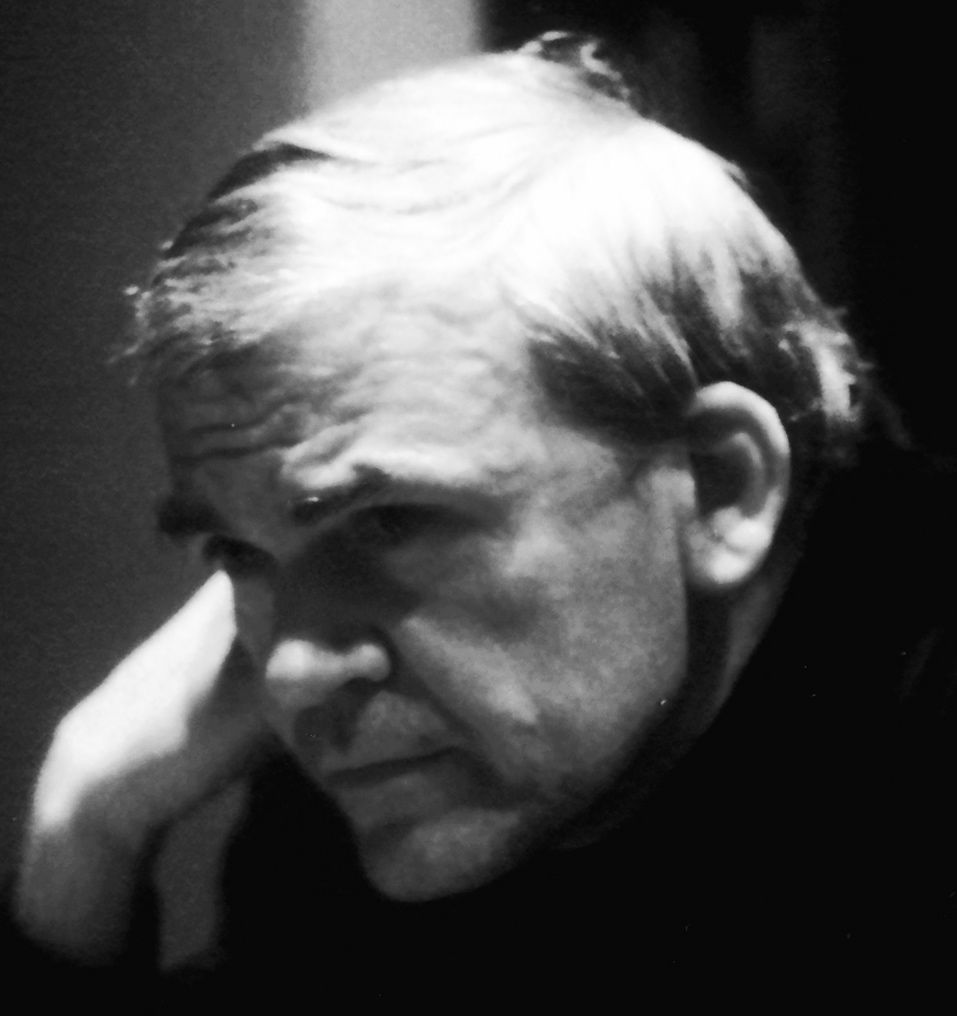
Milan Kundera

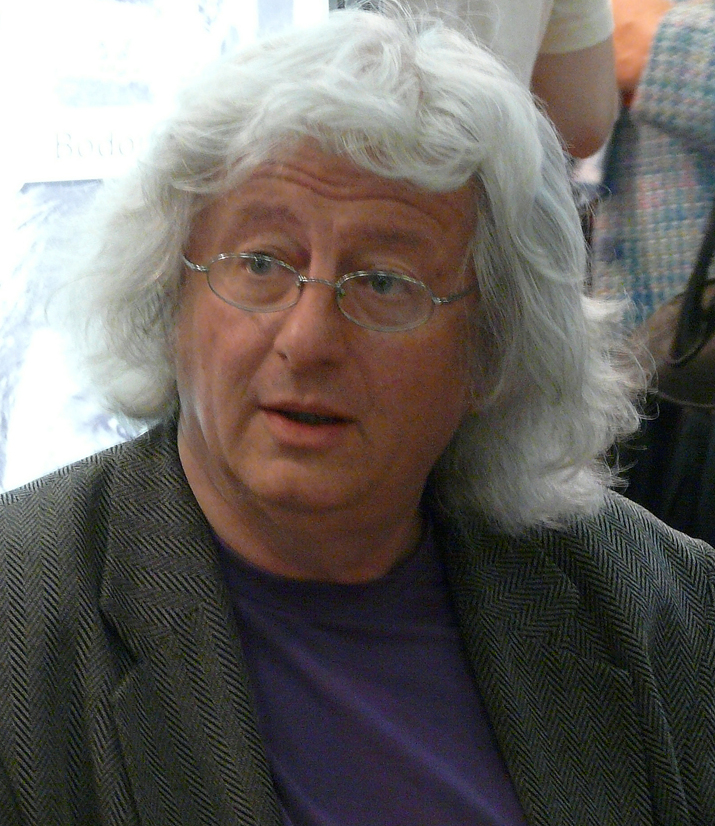
Péter Esterházy

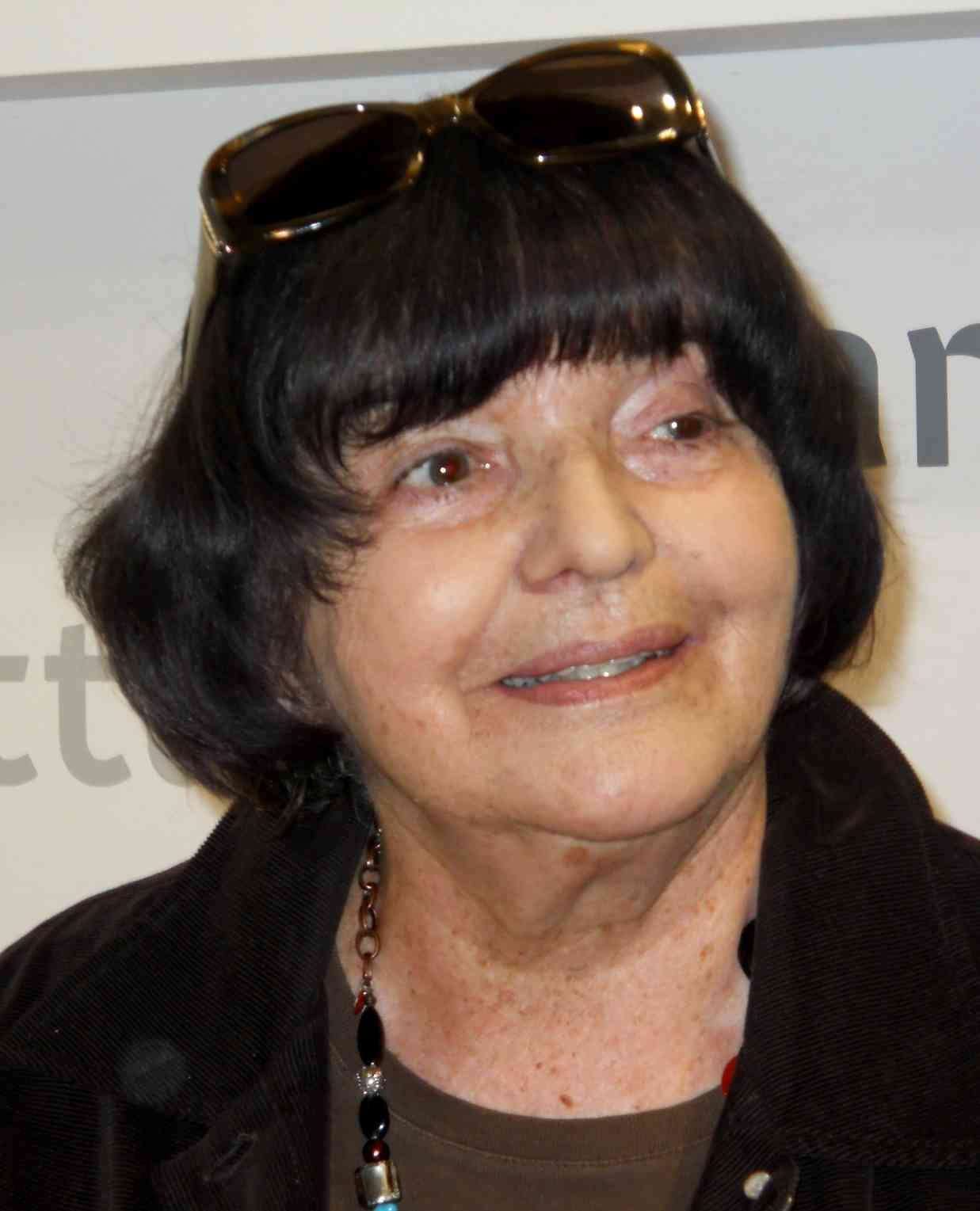
Hanna Krall

Year	Recipients
1964	Oto Bihalji-Merin, Jan Kott, Stanisław Lorentz, Lucijan Marija Škerjanc
1965	Tudor Arghezi, Manolis Hatzidakis, Emanuel Hruška, Zoltán Kodály, László Németh, Hugo Rokyta, Hristo Vakarelski
1966	Ján Cikker, Dezső Dercsényi, Zlatko Gorjan, Aleksander Kobzdej, Anton Kriesis, Niko Kuret, Dimiter Statkov
1967	Iván Fenyő, Vladimír Kompánek, Witold Lutosławski, Spyridon Marinatos, Alexandru A. Philippide, Mihai Pop, Svetozar Radojčić
1968	Constantin Daicoviciu, Roman Ingarden, Miroslav Krleža, Ludvík Kunz, Anastasios Orlandos, Lajos Vayer, Pancho Vladigerov
1969	Jolán Balogh, Albín Brunovský, Bohuslav Fuchs, Mihail Jora, Marijan Matković, Ksawery Piwocki, France Stele
1970	Jan Białostocki, Jan Filip, Zoltán Franyó, Milovan Gavazzi, Gyula Illyés, Yiannis Papaioannou, Zeko Torbov
1971	Jiří Kolář, Blaže Koneski, Georgios Megas, Kazimierz Michałowski, Mihail Sokolovski, Zaharia Stancu, Bence Szabolcsi
1972	Dragotin Cvetko, Atanas Dalchev, Branko Maksimović, Gyula Ortutay, Jaroslav Pešina, Henryk Stażewski, Virgil Vătășianu
1973	Veselin Beshevliev, Stylianos Harkianakis, János Harmatta, Zbigniew Herbert, Eugen Jebeleanu, Petar Lubarda, Jan Racek
1974	Władysław Czerny, Ivan Duichev, Ivo Frangeš, László Gerő, Stylianos Pelekanidis, Ján Podolák, Zeno Vancea
1975	Józef Burszta, Hristo M. Danov, Stanislav Libenský, Maria Ana Musicescu, Gábor Preisich, Pandelis Prevelakis, Stanojlo Rajičić
1976	Jagoda Buić, Marin Goleminov, Ioannis Kakridis, Dezső Keresztury, Nichita Stănescu, Rudolf Turek, Kazimierz Wejchert
1977	Nikolaos Andriotis, Riko Debenjak, Emmanuel Kriaras, Albert Kutal, Máté Major, Krzysztof Penderecki, Anastas Petrov, Ion Vladutiu
1978	Eugen Barbu, Đurđe Bošković, Kazimierz Dejmek, Stoyan Dzudzev, Béla Gunda, Jiří Hrůza, Yiannis Spyropoulos
1979	Magdalena Abakanowicz, Ferenc Farkas, Zdenko Kolacio, Atanas Natev, András Sütő, Pavel Trost, Apostolos E. Vacalopoulos
1980	Gordana Babić-Đorđević, Iván Balassa, Kamil Lhoták, Manousos Manousakas, Vera Mutafchieva, Alexandru Rosetti, Wiktor Zin
1981	Emil Condurachi, Sándor Csoóri, Stefka Georgieva, Dimitrios Loukatos, Vjenceslav Richter, Eugen Suchoň, Elida Maria Szarota
1982	Athanasios Aravantinos, Ana Blandiana, Vojislav J. Đurić, Sona Kovacevicová, Aleksandar Nichev, Jan Józef Szczepański, Imre Varga
1983	Władysław Bartoszewski, Géza Entz, Jozef Jankovič, Günther Schuller, Zdenko Škreb, Stefana Stoykova, C. A. Trypanis
1984	Emilijan Cevc, Konstantinos Dimaras, Karel Horálek, György Konrád, Constantin Lucaci, Krasimir Manchev, Krzysztof Meyer
1985	Branko Fučić, Růžena Grebeníčková, Adrian Marino, Demetrios Pallas, Károly Perczel, Simeon Pironkov, Andrzej Wajda
1986	Georgi Baev, Tekla Dömötör, Boris Gaberščik, Konrad Górski, Johannes Karayannopoulos, Jiří Kotalík, Anatol Vieru
1987	Roman Brandstaetter, Doula Mouriki, József Ujfalussy, Vladimir Veličković, Velizar Velkov, Gheorghe Vrabie
1988	Roman Berger, Christos Kapralos, Zoe Dumitrescu-Bușulenga, György Györffy, Donka Petkanova, Mieczysław Porębski, Edvard Ravnikar
1989	Maria Banuș, Ákos Birkás, Jerzy Buszkiewicz, Václav Frolec, Nikolai Genchev, Petar Miljković-Pepek, Nikos Gabriel Pentzikis
1990	Liviu Călin, Bronisław Geremek, Aris Konstantinidis, Dejan Medaković, Virginia Paskaleva, Adriena Šimotová, András Vizkelety
1991	Maja Bošković-Stulli, Gerard Labuda, Andor Pigler, Yorgos Sicilianos, Emil Skála, Marin Sorescu, Stoimen Stoilov
1992	Manolis Andronikos, Jenö Barabás, Blaga Dimitrova, Stefan Kaszynski, Jiří Kořalka, Zmaga Kumer, Ion Nicodim
1993	Vasilka Gerasimova-Tomova, Petro Kononenko, György Kurtág, Jerzy Tchórzewski, Răzvan Theodorescu, Elena Várossová, Māra Zālīte, Dionysis Zivas, Viktor Žmegač
1994	István Borzsák, Dževad Juzbašić, Ștefan Niculescu, Andrzej Szczypiorski, Jitka and Květa Válová, Takis Varvitsiotis, Zigmas Zinkevičius
1995	Sándor Kányádi, Mirko Kovač, Milcho Lalkov, Michael G. Meraklis, Mindaugas Navakas, Wisława Szymborska, Jaan Undusk
1996	Tamás Hofer, Karel Hubáček, Konstantin Iliev, Marin Mincu, Jože Pogačnik, Pēteris Vasks, Marian Zgórniak
1997	Tasos Athanasiadis, Bogdan Bogdanović, Oskár Elschek, Ferenc Glatz, Lech Kalinowski, Jaan Kross, Dunja Rihtman-Auguštin
1998	Imre Bak, Andrei Corbea-Hoișie, Eliška Fučíková, Ismail Kadare, Justinas Marcinkevičius, Dorota Simonides, Elena Toncheva
1999	Svetlana Alexievich, Vera Bitrakova-Grozdanova, Mircea Dinescu, István Fried, Henryk Górecki, Dževad Karahasan, Ferdinand Milučký
2000	Ján Bakoš, Ivan Čolović, Nikola Georgiev, Imre Kertész, Milan Kundera, Karolos Mitsakis, Arvo Pärt
2001	Yurii Andrukhovych, Janez Bernik, János Böhönyey, Maria Kłańska, Marek Kopelent, Andrej Mitrović, Evanghelos Moutsopoulos
2002	George Demetrius Bambiniotis, Māris Čaklais, Péter Esterházy, Radost Ivanova, Nedjeljko Fabrio, Aurel Stroe, Lech Trzeciakowski
2003	Vasil Gyuzelev, Drago Jančar, Károly Manherz, Stanisław Mossakowski, Ales Rasanau, Ludvík Václavek, Ana Maria Zahariade
2004	Theodore Antoniou, Michał Głowiński, Dušan Kováč, Fatos Lubonja, Éva Pócs, Kazimir Popkonstantinov, Romualdas Požerskis
2005	Károly Klimó, Hanna Krall, Primož Kuret, Jiří Kuthan, Andrei Marga, Eimuntas Nekrošius, Krešimir Nemec
2006	Włodzimierz Borodziej, Nicos Hadjinicolaou, Gabriela Kiliánová, Ene Mihkelson, Vojteh Ravnikar

== See also ==
- List of social sciences awards
- List of general awards in the humanities
