= Doula Mouriki =

Greek historian (1934–1991)

- Born: 1934
- Died: 1991 (aged 56–57)
- Awards: Gottfried von Herder Award

Academic background
- Education: University of Athens
- Alma mater: Princeton University
- Doctoral advisor: Kurt Weitzmann

Academic work
- Discipline: Art history
- Sub-discipline: Byzantine art; Orthodox art
- Institutions: National Technical University of Athens
- Notable works: The Mosaics and Frescoes of St. Mary Pammakaristos (1978); The Mosaics of Nea Moni on Chios (1985); Thirteenth-century Icon Painting on Cyprus (1986)

Doula Mouriki (Greek: Ντούλα Μουρίκη; 1934–1991) was a Greek Byzantinologist and art historian. She made important contributions to the study of Byzantine art in Greece.

== Education ==
Doula Mouriki was born in 1934 at Ampelokepi (near Aigio). She earned degrees in history and archaeology in 1956 from the University of Athens. From 1956 to 1957, she received a scholarship to visit the École pratique des hautes études and the Collège de France, where she studied under André Grabar and Paul Lemerle. Afterwards, she returned to the University of Athens to earn a degree in French literature in 1958.

In the early 1960s, Mouriki was first hired as a temporary staff member by the National Archaeological Museum of Athens and shortly thereafter as a principal research assistant under Manolis Hatzidakis at the Byzantine and Christian Museum. She later attended Princeton University, studying with Kurt Weitzmann. At Princeton, Mouriki earned an MFA in 1968 and a PhD in 1970, completing her doctoral dissertation on miniatures in Byzantine manuscripts of Cosmas Indicopleustes' Christian Topography. She holds the distinction of being the first woman to earn a PhD from the university's Department of Art and Archaeology.

== Career ==
After receiving her PhD, Mouriki taught at the National Technical University of Athens, where she remained for the rest of her career. She was the first woman to receive the title of professor in the university's School of Architecture. Mouriki also served as a member of the administrative council of the Greek Archaeological Society, as a corresponding member of the Istituto di studi bizantini e neogreci, and on an advisory committee for the Greek Ministry of Culture on the preservation of historical monuments at Mistra.

Mouriki's areas of research included late medieval Cypriot icons, Middle Byzantine-period mosaics, and Palaiologan-era monumental painting programmes in Greece. She also produced two papers on Georgian fresco cycles. Many of her publications focused on Byzantine and Orthodox iconography, including that of the Virgin Mary, as well as the development of "regional schools" of medieval Orthodox painting. Her 1985 monograph on the mosaics of the Nea Moni of Chios was awarded the Gottfried von Herder Award.

Mouriki died on 25 November 1991 in Athens, Greece.

== Publications ==
- The Frescoes of the Church of St. Nicholas at Platsa in the Mani, Athens, 1975
- The Mosaics and Frescos of St. Mary Pammakaristos (Fethiye Camii at Istanbul), with Hans Belting and Cyril Mango, Washington, D.C., 1978
- "Stylistic Trends in Monumental Painting of Greece during the Eleventh and Twelfth Centuries," Dumbarton Oaks Papers, vol. 34/35 (1981): pp. 77–124
- The Mosaics of Nea Moni on Chios, Athens, 1985 (Gottfried von Herder Award, 1987)
- Thirteenth-century Icon Painting in Cyprus, Athens, 1986
- The Twilight of Byzantium: Aspects of Cultural and Religious History in the Late Byzantine Empire, editor and contributor with Slobodan Ćurčić, Princeton, 1991
