= Zmaga Kumer =

Slovenian ethnomusicologist (1924–2008)

- Kumer before 1996
- Born: 25 April 1924; Ribnica, Ribnica, Slovenia
- Died: 27 December 2008 (aged 84); Gornji Grad, Slovenia
- Occupations: Ethnomusicologist; academic
- Known for: Slovenian folk song scholarship

Academic background
- Education: University of Ljubljana; Academy of Music

Academic work
- Discipline: Ethnomusicology
- Institutions: University of Ljubljana; Academy of Music

Zmaga Kumer (24 April 1924 – 27 December 2008) was a Slovenian ethnomusicologist and academic. A leading authority on Slovenian folk songs, she published over 450 works on the subject. She taught at both of her alma maters, the Academy of Music from 1953 to 1966 and the University of Ljubljana from 1966 to 1989.

== Life and career ==
Zmaga Kumer was born on 24 April 1924 in Ribnica, Slovenia. She earned a degree from the University of Ljubljana in 1948, where she studied Slovenian literature within Slavic studies, and subsequently attended the Ljubljana Academy of Music, graduating in 1952 with a degree in musicology from the folklore-historical department. Kumer returned to the University of Ljubljana, receiving a PhD in 1955; her dissertation analyzed Slovenian versions of "Puer natus in Bethlehem", a medieval Christmas hymn. The philologist and folk song researcher Karel Štrekelj (1859–1912) was her role model.

Kumer taught ethnomusicology at both her alma maters: first at the Ljubljana Academy of Music from 1953 to 1966, and later at the University of Ljubljana from 1966 to 1989. From 1948/49 until 1988/89 she was a research advisor at the Ljubljana Institute of Ethnomusicology under the Research Centre of the Slovenian Academy of Sciences and Arts (ZRC SAZU). (Note: Kumer retired from teaching at the University of Ljubljana in 1989; however, sources report varying years for Kumer's retirement date from ZRC SAZU: some give 1988, others give 1989.) She became an honorary member of the ZRC SAZU in 1995/96. (Note: Sources are divided on the year she became an honorary member of the ZRC SAZU; some give 1995, others 1996.) Throughout her career, Kumer held numerous positions at other institutions, including group member of The International Folk Music Council, board member (1973–1993) of the European Prize for Folk Art, and a founding member and multi-term vice president of SIEF's International Ballad Commission. She also delivered guest lectures on Slovenian folk music variously in Innsbruck, Munich and Sarajevo. Despite retiring in 1988/89, the ethnologist Marko Terseglav noted that "even after her retirement, [Kumer] came to the institute every morning for many years and prepared her new books and articles." She eventually moved to Gornji Grad, Slovenia, where she died on 27 December 2008.

Kumer received numerous awards throughout her career, including the Order of Labour (1983), the Murk Award (1989) and the Herder Prize (1992). In 1998, she received the Zois Award, the highest Slovenian academic prize, followed by the Štreklj Award in 2003.

Her career has been described as "extremely productive"; she authored over 450 total publications, which included 37 book-length monographs. Considered a "leading Slovenian authority on ethnomusicology", Kumer primarily researched Slovenian folk songs. She often published in both Slovenian and German, including anthologies, indexes, anthologies as well as texts on instrument-making and performance practice. She connected her research to the folk music of nearby Alpine states, identifying and exploring their shared topics, melodies and texts. Her work culminated in two monographs: the 1996 Vloga, zgradba, slog slovenski ljudske pesmi (The Role, Structure, and Style of Slovenian Folk Song), and the 2002 Slovenska ljudska pesem (The Slovenian Folk Song). She also published an important textbook, Etnomuzikologija (Ethnomusicology) in 1988. The literary critic Marjetka Golež Kaučič surmised that "Kumer followed her life values towards an important goal: to demonstrate that, in both general and specific sense, the Slovenian folk heritage, with its characteristic elements, is one of the most important foundations of Slovenian independence and is at the same time an important part of European culture."

== Selected writings ==
For other writings see Bujic 2001

- Kumer, Zmaga (1954). Slovenske prireditve srednjeveske bozicne pesmi Puer natus in Betlehem [Slovenian Adaptations of the Medieval Christmas Song Puer natus in Betlehem] (PhD) (in Slovenian). Ljubljana: University of Ljubljana. OCLC 441655579.
- —— (1961). "Zur Frage der deutsch-slowenischen Wechselbeziehungen im Volkslied" [On the Question of German-Slovene Interrelations in Folk Songs]. Zeitschrift für Volkskunde (in Slovenian). 2: 239–243.
- —— (1962). "Balada o maščevanju zapuščene ljubice" [The Ballad of the Deserted Sweetheart's Reveng]. Slovenski Etnograf (in Slovenian). 15: 167–198.
- —— (1968). "Skladnosti in razlike v južnoslovanskih variantah balade o razbojnikovi ženi" [Similarities and Differences Among the South Slavonic Variants of the Ballad of the Robber's Wife]. Narodno stvaralaštvo (in Slovenian). 7: 52–60.
- —— (1976). "Zur Frage der Flugblattlieder in Slowenien" [On the Question of Leaflet Songs in Slovenia]. Jb für Volksliedforschung (in Slovenian). 21: 114–125. doi:10.2307/846444. JSTOR 846444.
- —— (1978). "Die slowenische Volksballade" [The Slovenian Folk Ballad]. Jb für Volksliedforschung (in Slovenian). 23: 137–150. doi:10.2307/847252. JSTOR 847252.
- —— (1991). "The Folk Ballad in Slovenia" (PDF). Oral Tradition. 6/2 (3): 239–252.
- —— (1993). "Eno dete je rojeno" [A Child is Born]. Cerkveni Glasbenik (in Slovenian). 86: 73–76.
- —— (1996). Vloga, zgradba, slog slovenske ljudske [The Role, Structure, and Style of Slovenian Folk Song] (in Slovenian). Ljubljana: Znanstvenoraziskovalni center Slovenske akademije znanosti in umetnosti. doi:10.3986/9616182110. ISBN 978-961-6182-11-9. OCLC 38228723.
- —— (2002). Slovenska ljudska pesem [The Slovenian Folk Song] (in Slovenian). Ljubljana: Slovenska matica v Ljubljani. ISBN 978-961-213-095-4. OCLC 60834930.
