= Virgil Vătășianu =

Romanian art historian (1902–1993)

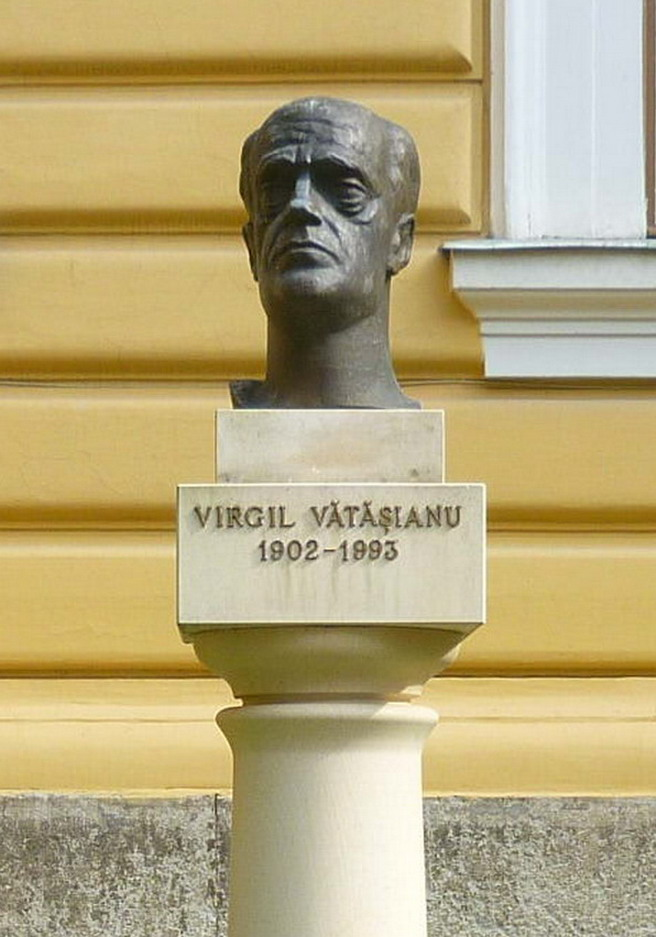
Vatasianu's bust in the Babeș-Bolyai University

Virgil Vătășianu (March 21, 1902—November 15, 1993) was a Romanian academic and art historian.

Born in Sibiu, he studied Law and Art History, becoming one of the two leading practitioners of the latter discipline in Cluj-Napoca during his time, alongside Nicolae Sabău. A specialist in medieval art, he became renowned through his numerous works, which earned him both the Herder Prize and election to the Romanian Academy, as a titular member, in 1974. He died in Cluj-Napoca.
