= Milovan Gavazzi =

Croatian ethnologist

- Born: 18 March 1895; Gospić, Kingdom of Croatia-Slavonia, Austria-Hungary
- Died: 20 January 1992 (aged 96); Zagreb, Croatia
- Education: University of Zagreb; Charles University
- Occupations: Ethnologist, ethnographer
- Awards: Herder Prize (1970)

Milovan Gavazzi (18 March 1895 – 20 January 1992) was a Croatian ethnographer.

Two awards of the Croatian Ethnographic Society are named after him: the annual award and lifetime achievements award, in ethnology.

In 1992, the entire private library (over 1500 volumes of journals and over 1600 books) of Milovan Gavazzi was donated to the library of the Department of Ethnology, Zagreb.

== Monographs ==
- Godina dana hrvatskih narodnih običaja (1939) (1988: ISBN 8680825387) (free download from scribd)
- Vrela i sudbine narodnih tradicija (1978)
- Baština hrvatskog sela (1991) (1993: ISBN 9536054027)
- Izabrani radovi s podrucja glazbe (1919–1976), 1988, ISBN 8680825271
