= Frasin =

- Town
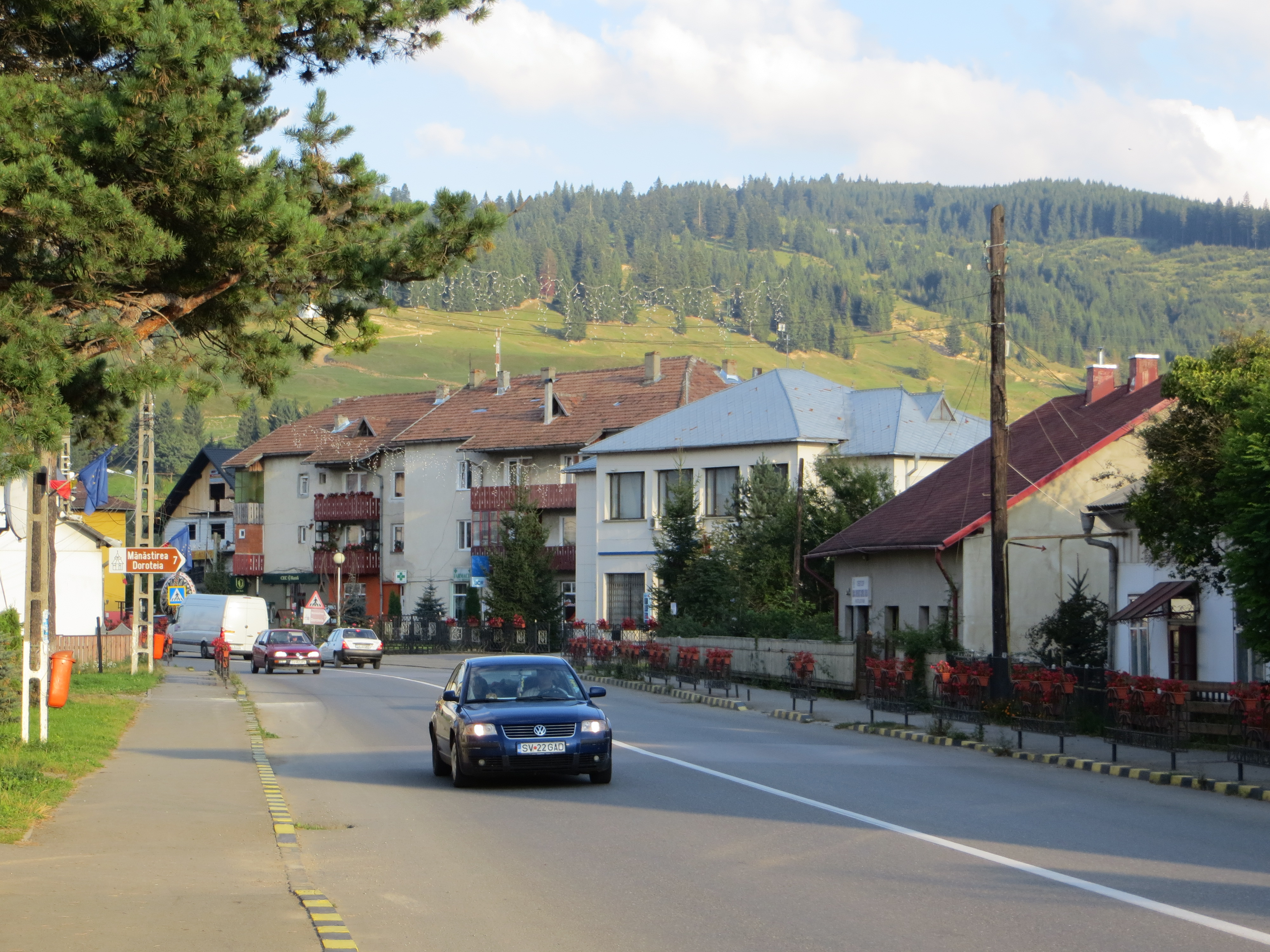
- Downtown Frasin

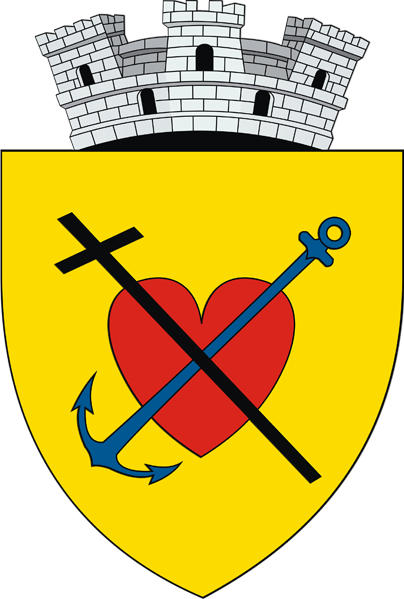
- Coat of arms

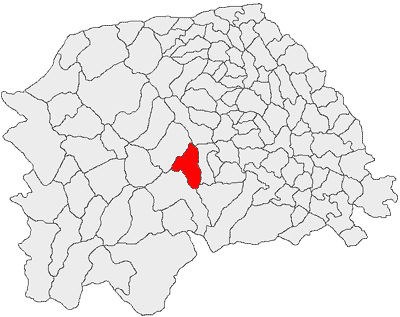
- Location in Suceava County

- Location in Romania
- Coordinates: 47°31′6″N 25°46′55″E
- Country: Romania
- County: Suceava

Government
  - Mayor (2024–2028): Marinel Bălan (PNL)
- Area: 87.31 km^{2} (33.71 sq mi)
- Elevation: 505 m (1,657 ft)
- Population (2021-12-01): 5,817
  - Density: 66.62/km^{2} (172.6/sq mi)
- Time zone: UTC+02:00 (EET)
  - Summer (DST): UTC+03:00 (EEST)
- Postal code: 727245
- Area code: (+40) 02 30
- Vehicle reg.: SV
- Website: www.primariaorasuluifrasin.ro

Historical population
Year	Pop.	±%
2002	6,532	—
2011	5,702	−12.7%
2021	5,817	+2.0%
Source: Census data

Frasin (German: Frassin or Fraßin) is a town in Suceava County, mountainous northeastern Romania. It is situated in the historical regions of Bukovina and Western Moldavia. Frasin is the thirteenth-largest urban settlement in the county, with a population of 5,817 according to the 2021 census. It was declared a town in 2004, along with seven other localities in Suceava County.

The town administers the former village of Bucșoaia (German: Bukschoja) (which became a neighborhood in 2004), as well as the associated villages of Doroteia (German: Dorothea) and Plutonița (German: Plutonitza).

== Administration and local politics ==
=== Town council ===
The town's former local council had the following political composition, according to the results of the 2020 Romanian local elections:

Party	Seats	Current Council
National Liberal Party (PNL)	5	
People's Movement Party (PMP)	3	
Save Romania Union (USR)	3	
Social Democratic Party (PSD)	2	
PRO Romania (PRO)	1	
National Unity Block (BUN)	1	

The town's current local council has the following political composition, according to the results of the 2024 Romanian local elections:

Party	Seats	Current Council
National Liberal Party (PNL)	7	
Alliance for the Union of Romanians (AUR)	5	
Social Democratic Party (PSD)	3	

== Geography ==
Frasin is surrounded by the Bukovina Ridges of the Obcinele Mari, on the banks of the Moldova River, between Câmpulung Moldovenesc and Gura Humorului, on European route E58. The town of Gura Humorului is only 7 km away. Frasin is connected to the Romanian national railway system by a railway station on the Suceava–Vatra Dornei railway.

== History ==
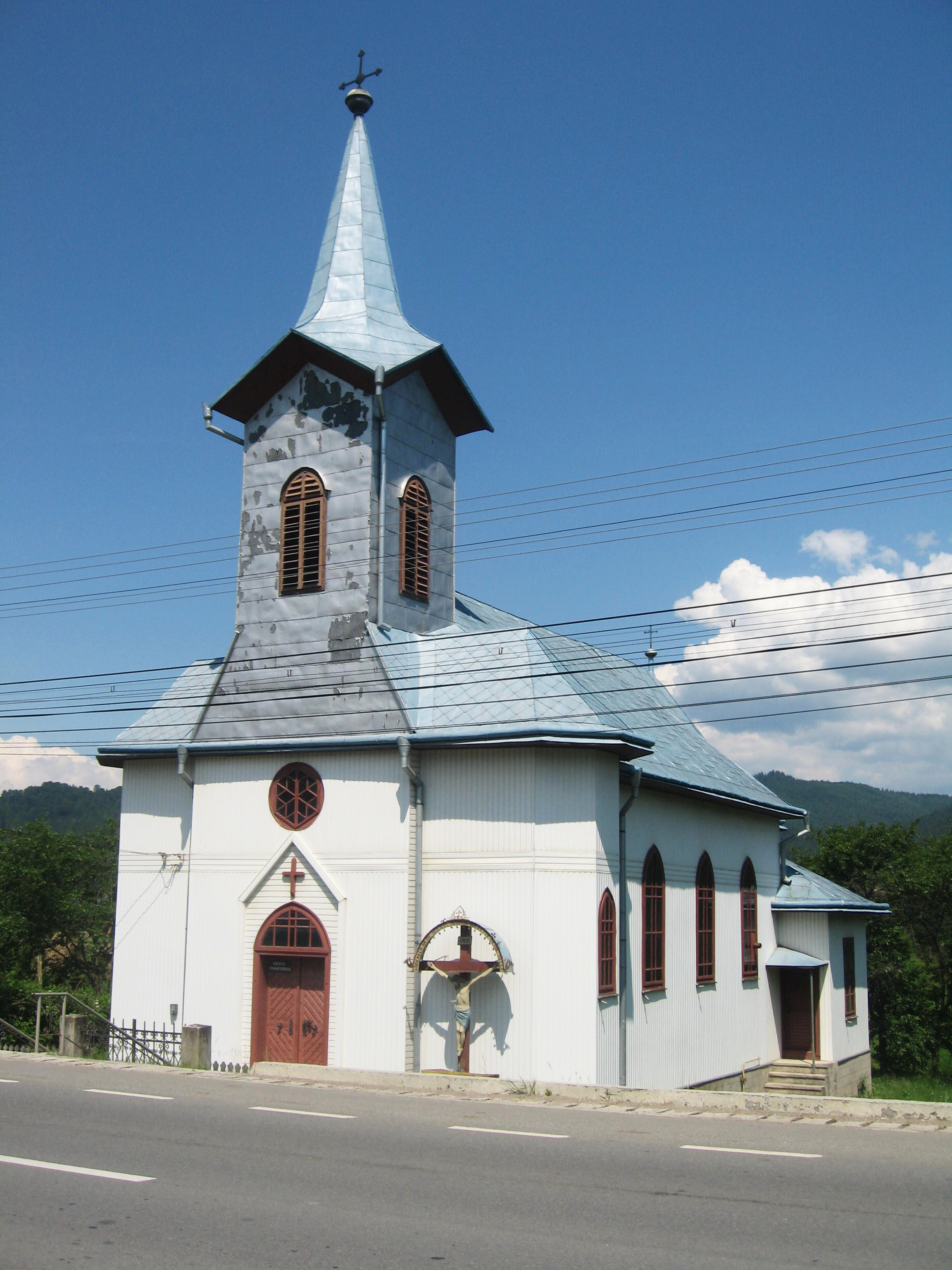
Roman Catholic church in Frasin, formerly belonging to the bygone German community of the town.

In 1785, Frasin was known as a hamlet. One big step towards its development for Frasin took place in 1816 when a potassium factory was built. Frasin was declared a town in 1850.

Until 1918, Frasin was part of the Austrian monarchy (the province of Bukovina remained an Austrian crown land (German: Kronland) after the compromise of 1867), in the Câmpulung district, one of the nine Bezirkshauptmannschaften of the province.

== Tourism ==
Frasin is located in the historical region of Bukovina where visitors can admire several painted medieval churches with World Heritage status. One of the most popular is Voroneț Monastery, built in 1488. Another asset of the area are the nature reserves, such as the primeval forest of Slătioara ("Codrul secular Slătioara") and the forests of the Giumalău Mountains.

== Natives ==
- Radu Mareș (1941–2016), prose writer and journalist
