= Gemenea =

- Location within Romania

Location
- Country: Romania
- Counties: Suceava County
- Villages: Gemenea, Stulpicani

Physical characteristics
- Source: Stânișoara Mountains
- Mouth: Suha
  - location: Stulpicani
  - coordinates: 47.4545°N 25.7666°E
- Length: 15 km (9.3 mi)
- Basin size: 76 km^{2} (29 sq mi)

Basin features
- Progression: Suha→ Moldova→ Siret→ Danube→ Black Sea
- Tributaries
  - left: Hogea, Slătioara

The Gemenea is a left tributary of the river Suha in Romania. It flows into the Suha in Stulpicani. Its length is 15 km (9.3 mi) and its basin size is 76 km^{2} (29 sq mi).
