= Valea Satului (Iza) =

- Location within Romania

Location
- Country: Romania
- Counties: Maramureș County

Physical characteristics
- Mouth: Iza
  - location: Strâmtura
  - coordinates: 47.7706°N 24.1292°E
- Length: 8 km (5.0 mi)
- Basin size: 22 km^{2} (8.5 sq mi)

Basin features
- Progression: Iza→ Tisza→ Danube→ Black Sea

The Valea Satului is a right tributary of the river Iza in Romania. It discharges into the Iza in Strâmtura. Its length is 8 km (5.0 mi) and its basin size is 22 km^{2} (8.5 sq mi).
