= Lajos Gádoros =

Hungarian architect and designer

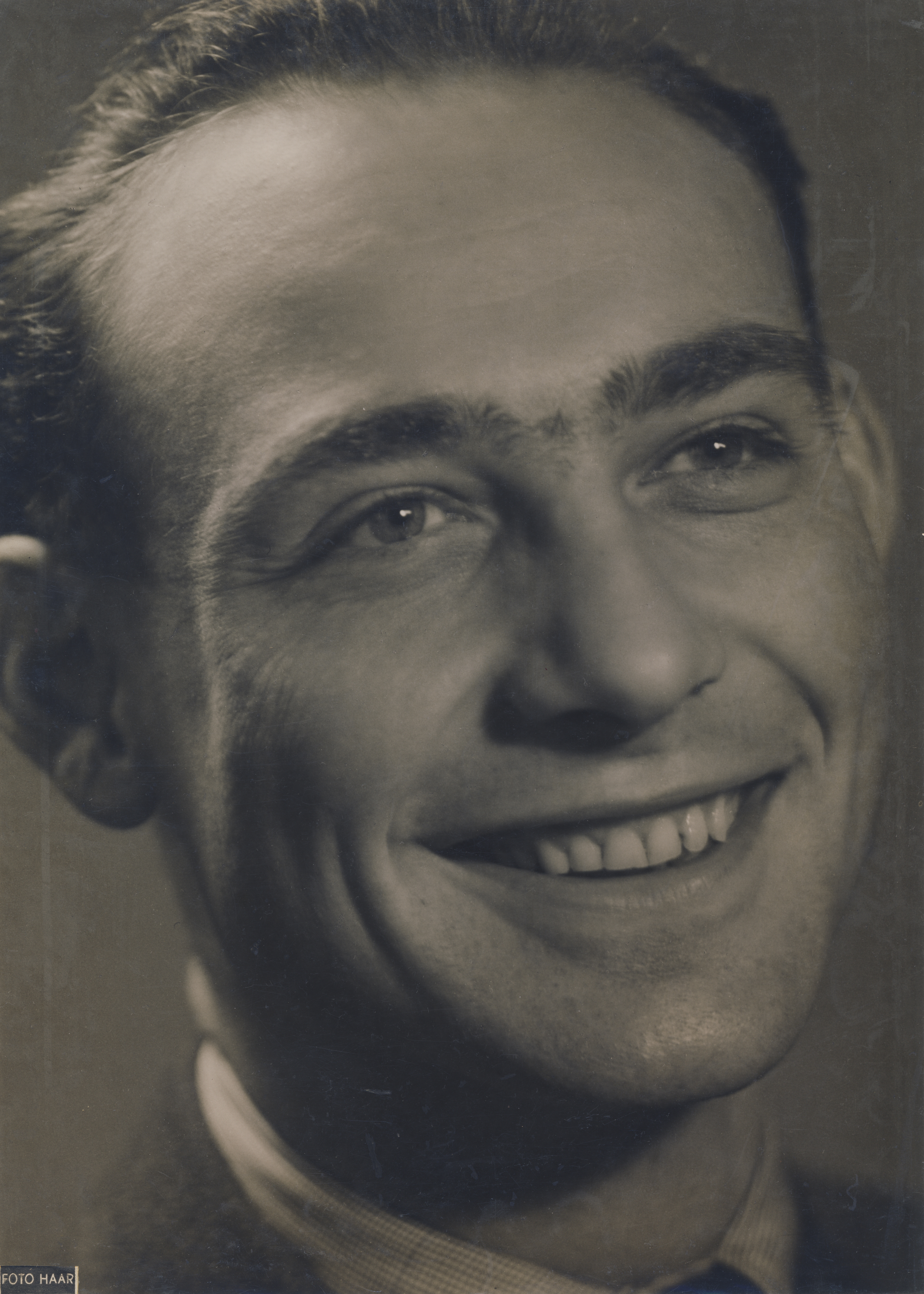
- Born: June 23, 1910; Erzsébetfalva
- Died: March 11, 1991 (aged 80); Budapest
- Occupations: Architect, Interior Designer, Furniture Designer, University Professor
- Spouses: 1940-46: Antónia Czigler (Antonia Gerard); 1947-75: Erzsébet Ivanovszky
- Children: Mária Gádoros (Mrs. Miklós Bartók); Dr. Júlia Gádoros; Katalin Gádoros
- Awards: Ybl Prize (1953, 1958); Order of the Crown (1958); Candidate of Science (1962)

Lajos Gádoros (born Lajos Gonda; June 23, 1910 in Erzsébetfalva – March 11, 1991 in Budapest) was a renowned Hungarian architect, interior designer, furniture designer and university professor.

== Career ==
Gádoros began his career as an apprentice in his father's woodworking shop, and in 1926 he was accepted to the furniture design program at the Hungarian Royal School of Applied Arts, where he studied under the tutelage of Gyula Kaesz and Károly Weichinger. Heeding Prof. Weichinger's advice, he applied to and attended the Technical College of Stuttgart in Germany (Technischen Hochschule Stuttgart; today: Universität Stuttgart) between 1929 and 1930, where he studied with Paul Bonatz. Gádoros later went on to study with Clemens Holzmeister at the Arts Academy in Düsseldorf (Kunstakademie Düsseldorf), and in 1933 he returned home to Hungary. Following his return, he soon began working and designing furniture for Antal Nagy, and later obtained a position at the design studio of Lajos Kozma. In 1935, Gádoros was employed by Gyula Kaesz's design firm, but soon began to take on independent projects as well, such as designing family homes, storefronts and interiors. In addition, Gádoros submitted a variety of grant proposals during this period while working in partnership with Pál Vince (also known as Pál Weiss), his former classmate from Stuttgart and Düsseldorf. Beginning in 1939, he was repeatedly conscripted into the army: as a sapper, Gádoros was sent to the Russian battlefront, and served as a liaison officer between the German and Hungarian troops. He was later captured by German forces as a result of his attempt to desert the army of the Axis powers. After the German troops were overpowered by the Allies, Gádoros was transported near to the city of Munich, and was held prisoner of war by the Americans. Following his brief confinement, Gádoros was released and returned to Budapest

Between 1945 and 1947, Gádoros worked for the National Housing Committee and for the Municipal Council of Construction and Public Work. During this same period, he managed a privately held company with his partner Gábor Preisich. After submitting their plans for a grant, they were commissioned to design MÉMOSZ Hall (National Association of Hungarian Contractors). Together they also participated in the design of the Ministry of Interior (today: The Office of the National Assembly) as well as the interior design of Nagyszállo on Margaret Island, known today as the Danubius Grand Hotel Budapest. In 1945, he was elected member of the Division of Applied Arts of the Hungarian Council of Arts, and in 1946, he became secretary of the Circle of New Architecture. In December 1947, Gádoros and Imre Perényi co-founded the privately held Center for Architecture. In 1948, he was employed by the de-privatized ÉTI (Institute of Architecture), and in December 1948, he became manager of the Division of Housing at MATI (Highrise Design Firm). As MATI was re-structured in the fall of 1949 to become KÖZTI (Public Buildings Design Firm and National Enterprise), Gádoros was promoted to director. Due to his ability to acquire some of the most renowned architects for KÖZTI, such as István Janaky Sr, Gyula Rimanóczy, Iván Kotsis and István Medgyaszay, the firm became one of the most influential organizations in the field of architecture during the immediate post-war era.

As a result of the Hungarian Revolution of 1956, Gádoros announced his intentions to resign his post as director of KÖZTI, and despite the protest of his colleagues, he eventually stepped down. Between 1957 and 1960, Gádoros was designer and principal architect at ÁÉTV (General Architectural and Engineering Company). It was during this time that Gádoros won the Star of Gold award at the Expo 58 (also known as the Brussels World's Fair) with his Hungarian Pavilion design, as well as finished his designs for the University of Pécs Medical School. Alongside Pál Sávoly, he played a crucial role in the restoration of Elisabeth Bridge (1961-1964), and in 1960 he was appointed Head of Department of Freehand Drawing in the Faculty of Architecture at the Budapest University of Technology and Economics. In 1966, Gádoros took over the position of Head of Department of Public Building Design from his former professor Károly Weichinger. Gádoros resigned from his university post as Head of Department ten years later, in 1976, and in 1980, at the age of seventy, Gádoros officially retired. Laying out the plans for the building complex of the Vadaskert Child Psychiatry Hospital and Outpatient Clinic in 1989 was his last professional work. In 1994, Gádoros's family donated his inheritance to the Hungarian Museum of Architecture.

Gádoros was awarded the prestigious architectural Ybl Prize two times during his lifetime, first in 1953 for the design of Szinkron Studio (Pannonia Film Studio), and later in 1958 together with István Németh for the design of the Hungarian Pavilion at the Brussels World's Fair. For this latter design, Gádoros was also bestowed the Order of the Crown by Baudouin, King of the Belgians. In 1962, the Hungarian Academy of Sciences (MTA) awarded him the Candidate of Science degree. He was member of MTA's Architectural Committee, and received his last distinction on June 18, 1984. The award was endorsed by president of the Budapest University of Technology and Economics Dr. Károly Polinszky, and read: "this honorary medal is hereby awarded to retired university professor Dr. Lajos Gadoros for his distinguished accomplishments in the field of education."

== Awards ==
- 1953 – Ybl Prize – Szinkron Studio (Pannonia Film Studio)
- 1958 – Ybl Prize – Hungarian Pavilion at Brussels World's Fair (Expo 58)
- 1958 – Order of the Crown - Hungarian Pavilion at Brussels World's Fair (Expo 58)
- 1962 – Candidate of Science by Hungarian Academy of Sciences (MTA)
- 1984 – Honorary Medal by Budapest University of Technology and Economics

== Selected works ==
- 1935-36 – Mansion of the Emmer family – Sasfiók utca 4, District XII, Budapest, Hungary
- 1936 – Storefront of Veres Foto Optika, Vörösmarty ter 6, District V, Budapest, Hungary
- 1936-37 – Summerhouse of Gizella Flam, Déva utca 3, Siófok, Hungary
- Interior design and storefront of the Koestlin pastry shops
- 1946 – The re-modeling of Félix Perutz's wainwright shop, Kerteskő, Hungary
- 1947 – Storefront of Metalloglobusz (in partnership with Gábor Preisich), Bajcsy-Zsilinszky út 24. – Arany János utca 35, Budapest, Hungary
- 1948-49 – Apartment building on Béke tér, Csepel, Budapest, Hungary (in partnership with József Schall) – based on the same design, also built in Újpest, Salgótarján, Diósgyőr and Pécs
- 1947-50 – MÉMOSZ Hall (in partnership with Imre Perényi, Gábor Preisich, György Szrogh), Dózsa György út 84/A, District VI, Budapest, Hungary
- 1947-51 – Interior Ministry (today: The Office of the National Assembly), (in partnership with Ágost Benkhard, László Gábor, Gábor Preisich, Gyula Rudnai ), Jászai Mari tér, Budapest, Hungary
- 1952-54 – Szinkron Studio (Pannonia Film Studio), (in partnership with István Mühlbacher), Vörös Hadsereg útja (today: Hűvösvölgyi út) 64-66, District II, Budapest, Hungary
- 1953 – Design of the theater in Győr, interior design: István Németh (was never built)
- 1958 – Hungarian Pavilion at Brussels World's Fair (Expo 58), interior design: István Németh
- 1961 – Olimpia Restaurant, Uránváros, Pécs, Hungary, interior design: György Fekete
- 1957-66 – University of Pécs Medical School
- 1989 – Design of the Vadaskert Child Psychiatry Hospital and Outpatient Clinic, architect: Péter Krikovszky

== Bibliography ==
- Gádoros, Lajos (1946). A korszerű lakás térszükséglete és berendezése [The Spatial Requirements and the Furnishing of the Modern Home]. Budapest.
- Gádoros, Lajos (1956). A lakás berendezése és méretezése [Furnishing and Calculating the Dimensions of Homes]. Budapest.
- Gádoros, Lajos (1978). Középületek tervezése [Designing Public Buildings]. Budapest.

== Selected essays ==
- Gádoros, Lajos (1947). "A Pauler-utcai telektömbök beépítése [Development of the Pauler Street Land Lots]". Tér es Forma [Space and Form] (11): 246-248.
- Gádoros, Lajos (1948). "A bútor mint a lakás tervezés alapja [Furniture as the Foundation for Designing Homes]". Új Építészet [New Architecture] (6): 227–234
- Gádoros, Lajos (1949). "Lakásépítkezésünk eredményei és tanulságai [The Results and Lessons of Our Home Development Project]". Építészet-Építés [Architecture-Construction] (1-2): 11–16.
- Gádoros, Lajos (1959). "Brüsszeli világkiállítás 1958 [Brussels Word's Fair 1958]". Magyar Építőművészet [Hungarian Architecture] (1-2): 5–67
- Gádoros, Lajos (1962). "Korszerű klinikák tervezésének néhány elvi kérdése [Various Principles in the Design of Modern Medical Centers]". Építés és Közlekedéstudományi Közlemények [Publications in Architecture and Traffic Engineering] (1): 101–127
- G.L. [Gádoros, Lajos] (1967): "Pécsi Orvostudományi Egyetem Klinikai Főépülete [The Main Building of the University of Pecs Medical School]". Magyar Építőművészet [Hungarian Architecture] (2): 10–16
- Gádoros, Lajos (1984). "Reálisan a szocialista realizmusról [Realistically About Socialist Realism]". Magyar Építőművészet [Hungarian Architecture] (3): 17–19
- Gádoros, Lajos (1988). "A brüsszeli világkiállítás magyar pavilonjáról [About the Hungarian Pavilion at the Brussels World's Fair]". Magyar Építőművészet [Hungarian Architecture] (3): 34–35

== Exhibitions ==
- Lajos Gádoros (1910-1991) Memorial Exhibition, HAP Galeria, Budapest, Hungary October 12 – November 12, 2010
- Ungarn – Bauten der Aufbruchszeit 1945–1960, Ringturm, Vienna, Austria, March 26 – May 2, 2014
- Hungary – Architectural Works of a New Era, Fuga, Budapest, Hungary, May 22, 2014
