= Radu Mareș =

Romanian writer and journalist (1941–2016)

- Born: Radu Mareș; March 3, 1941; Frasin, Suceava County, Romania
- Died: March 26, 2016 (aged 75); Cluj-Napoca, Romania
- Education: Babeș-Bolyai University
- Occupations: Writer; journalist

Radu Mareș (March 3, 1941 – March 26, 2016) was a Romanian prose writer and journalist.

== Bibliography ==
- Anna sau pasărea paradisului (1972)
- Vine istoria (1972)
- Cel iubit (1975)
- Caii sălbatici (1981)
- Pe cont propriu (1986)
- Anul trecut în Calabria (2002)
- Manual de sinucidere (2003)
- Ecluza (2006)
- Când ne vom întoarce (2010)
- Deplasarea spre roșu (2012)
- Sindromul Robinson (2014)
