= Gábor Preisich =

Hungarian architect (1909–1998)

Gábor Preseich
- Born: 12 May 1909
- Died: 21 April 1998 (aged 88)
- Occupation: Architect

Gábor Preisich (12 May 1909 – 21 April 1998) was a Hungarian architect. He won the Herder Prize in 1975 along with Romanian poet Nichita Stănescu.

== Works ==
=== Buildings designed ===
- 1932. Budapest I., Gellérthegy utca 6. tenement house (in partnership with Aladár Münnich)
- 1933. Budapest II., Káplár utca 7. tenement house (in partnership with Mihály Vadász)
- 1933. Budapest XIV., Erzsébet királyné útja 30/b tenement house (in partnership with Mihály Vadász)
- 1933–34. Budapest XI., Bartók Béla (volt Horthy Miklós) út 62–64. tenement house and Simplon-, later Bartók Cinema (in partnership with Mihály Vadász)
- 1934–35. Budapest VIII., Köztársaság (earlier: Tisza Kálmán) tér 14, 15, 16. - Vay Ádám utca 2. tenement house (in partnership with: Bertalan Árkay, Sándor Faragó, József Fischer, Károly Heysa, Pál Ligeti, Farkas Molnár, Móricz Pogány, Mihály Vadász)
- 1935. Budapest XII., Városmajor utca 26/b. tenement house (in partnership with Mihály Vadász)
- 1935. Budapest XIV., Örs vezér út 52. family house (in partnership with Mihály Vadász)
- 1936. Budapest XII., Bazin utca 20. family house (in partnership with Mihály Vadász)
- 1936. Budapest XII., Rácz Aladár út 46. family house (in partnership with Mihály Vadász)
- 1936. Budapest XII., Tusnádi utca 34. family house (in partnership with Mihály Vadász)
- 1937. Budapest I., Krisztina krt. 69. tenement house (in partnership with Mihály Vadász)
- 1937. Budapest II., Margit krt. 65. tenement house (in partnership with Mihály Vadász)
- 1937–38. Budapest I., Csalogány utca 4/d. tenement house (in partnership with Mihály Vadász)
- 1937–38. Budapest V., Balassi Bálint (earlier: Személynöki) utca 2–4. Markó utca 1. Széchenyi rkp. 12–13. és Kossuth tér 18. tenement house (in partnership with Mihály Vadász). The frontage design by Andor Wellisch.
- 1940–41. Budapest XII., Városmajor utca 52. tenement house (in partnership with György Gerle)
- 1941. Budapest I., Kosciusco Tádé (earlier: Koronaőr) utca 14. és Márvány utca 1/b. tenement house (in partnership with György Gerle)
- 1942. Budapest XII., Hegyalja út 105. family house (in partnership with György Gerle)
- 1942. Budapest II., Endrődi Sándor utca 18/a. family house (in partnership with György Gerle)
- 1947. Budapest V., Bajcsy-Zsilinszky út 24. – Arany János utca 35. portal (in partnership with Lajos Gádoros)
- 1947–49. Budapest V., Jászai Mari tér 1. - Széchenyi rakpart 19. Ministry of the Interior (today: The Office of the National Assembly) (in partnership with Ágost Benkhard, László Gábor, Lajos Gádoros, Andor Lévai, Gyula Rudnai)
- 1948–50. Budapest VI., Dózsa György út 84/a. MÉMOSZ hall. today Liget-Center (in partnership with Lajos Gádoros, Imre Perényi, György Szrogh)
- 1961. Budapest XII., Kékgolyó u. 1. apartment house (in partnership with Albert Kiss, Árpád Mester)
- 1961. Budapest XI., Lágymányosi út, apartment houses
- 1961. Budapest XI., Lágymányosi út, school of housing estate (in partnership with Albert Kiss, Árpád Mester)
- 1964. Budapest II., Cseppkő utca 69. children's home
- 1969. and 1974. Szigliget, summer house

== Bibliography (in Hungarian) ==
- PREISICH – SÓS A .- BRENNER J.: Budapest városépítészeti kérdései, Budapest, 1954
- PREISICH – REISCHL – VADÁSZ: Városi családi ház, Budapest, 1959
- Budapest városépítésének története I. Buda visszavételétől a kiegyezésig, Budapest, 1960
- Budapest városrendezési problémái [ed.], Budapest, 1963
- Budapest városépítésének története II. A Kiegyezéstől a Tanácsköztársaságig, Budapest, 1964
- Budapest városépítésének története III. A két világháború közt és a felszabadulás után, Budapest, 1969
- Walter Gropius, Budapest, 1972 (1981-ben lengyel, 1982-ben német kiadás)
- Budapest jövője (ed.), Budapest, 1973
- Ernst May, Budapest, 1983
- Vélemények-viták a városépítésről [ed.], Budapest, 1984
- Budapest városépítésének története 1945–1990, Budapest, 1998
- Építészeti, városépítészeti pályafutásom története. Lapis angularis VII. Ed. Fehérvári Zoltán - Prakfalvi Endre, Budapest, 2009

== Selected essays (in Hungarian) ==
- A CIRPAC és a modern építészet, Magyar Szemle, 1931/9.
- Milyen lesz a jövő művészete, Független Kritika, 1 March 1935
- A háború utáni újjáépítés feladatai, Új Építészet, 1946/1.
- Hozzászólás Fülep Lajos: Egy nagy lehetőség Budapest újjáépítésében c. cikkéhez, Fórum, 1948
- Az építészeti forma kérdéséhez, Építés-Építészet, 1949/4.
- Feladataink az új Budapest felépítésében, Világosság, 17 Aug 1951
- A budapesti földalatti gyorsvasút városrendezési jelentősége, Magyar Építőművészet, 1953/3-4.
- Budapest városrendezési problémái, Magyar Építőművészet, 1953/5-6.
- A korszerű lakóház, Élet és Tudomány, 13 Oct. 1954
- Városépítés a Szovjetunióban, Magyar Építőművészet, 1954/10-12.
- Építőművészetünk problémái, Csillag, 1955/6.
- Budapest tíz éve, Magyar Építőművészet, 1955/3-5.
- Ízlés az építészetben – ízlés az utcán, Természet és Társadalom, 1955/11.
- A jövő Budapestje, Élet és Irodalom, 25 Oct. 1961
- Le Corbusier, a várostervező, Városépítés, 1965/5.
- A budapesti település-agglomeráció növekedése és az ebből adódó problémák, Demográfia, 1968/2.
- Az elismerés és a kritika hangján a METRÓ-ról, Budapest, 1973/3.
- Nyílt levél Bernáth Aurélhoz, Magyar Nemzet, 6 March 1973
- A METRÓ esztétikája, Művészet, 1973/10.
- Modernség (Hozzászólás a tulipán-vitához), Élet és Irodalom, 1975/11.
- Gondolatok a tömeges lakásépítés esztétikai kérdéseiről, Magyar Építőművészet, 1975/3.
- Elavult tömbök felújításos átépítése, Városépítés, 1975/1.
- Kételyeim (Hozzászólás a tulipán-vitához), Magyar Építőművészet, 1972/2.
- A Hilton-szálló a városképben, Budapest, 1977/3.
- Lakótelepek esztétikája, Budapest, 1977/3.
- Még mindig – Gropius?, Magyar Építőművészet, 1983/4.
