= Kowalczyk brothers =

Coordinates: 50.6689°N 17.9258°E

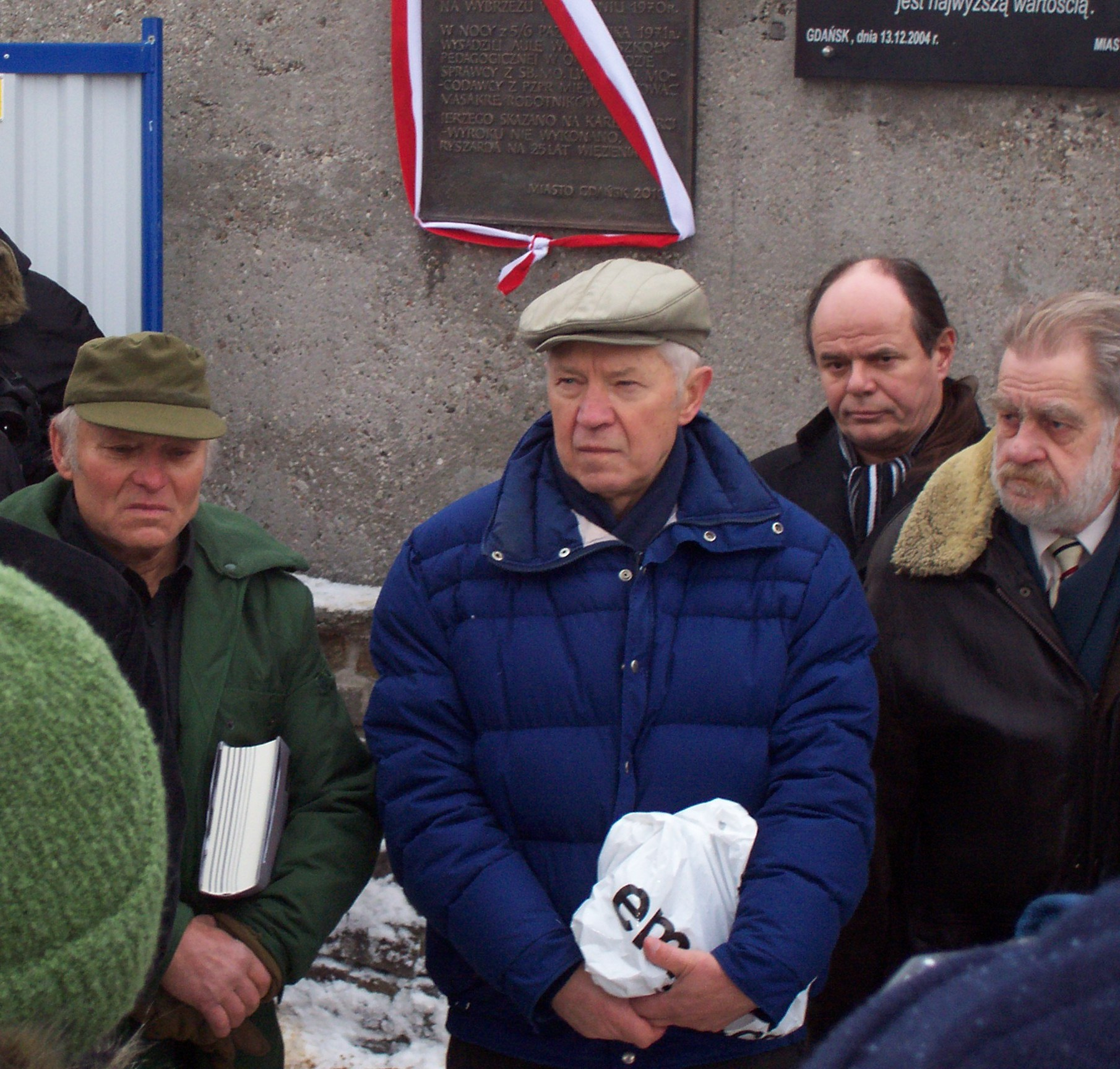
Ryszard Kowalczyk (in the middle) and his brother Jerzy (left) in Gdańsk, 18 December 2010. The two other men are Wiesław Ukleja and Andrzej Gwiazda

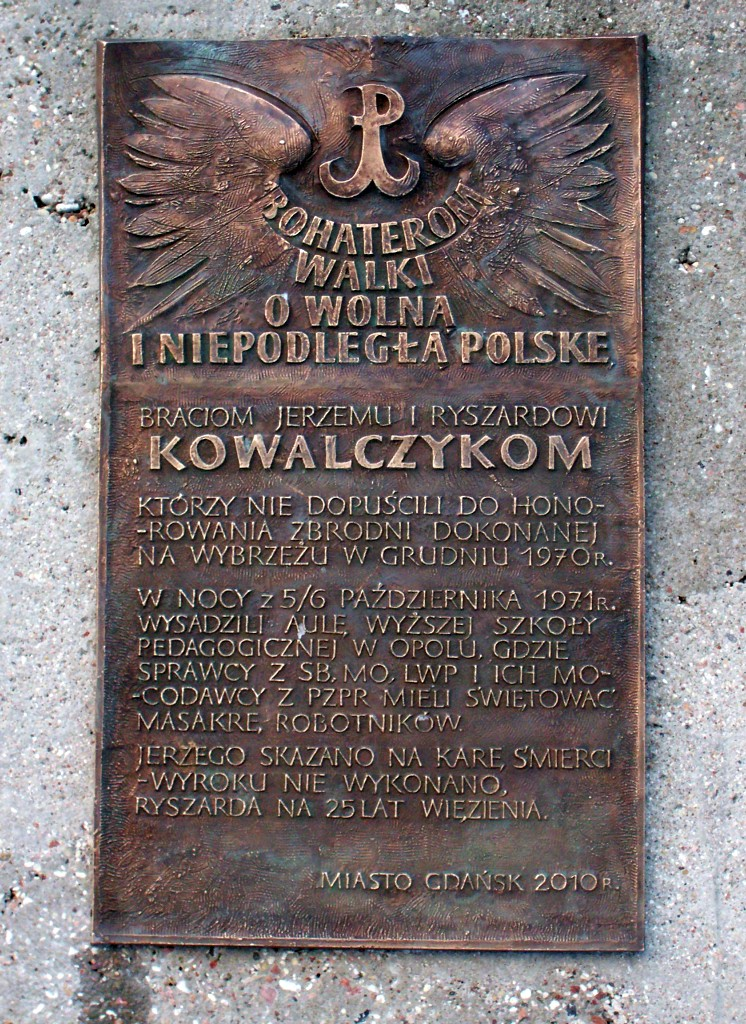
Plaque at Solidarity Square in Gdańsk

Ryszard Kowalczyk (20 February 1937 – 17 October 2017) and his younger brother Jerzy Kowalczyk (born 1942) were Polish brothers who planted a bomb as a protest against communist rule in Poland.

The Kowalczyk brothers were scientists at Opole University. They planted a bomb there on 6 October 1971 as a protest against the violence perpetrated by the communist authorities against the workers' protest. A big celebration for the Służba Bezpieczeństwa and Milicja Obywatelska was to take place at the university in the morning of the following day. The explosion destroyed the big university hall where the celebrations were to take place.

Although no-one was injured, a wide investigation was launched and the Kowalczyks were quickly arrested. On 8 September 1972 the Voivodeship Court in Opole sentenced Jerzy to death and Ryszard as his helper to 25 years in prison. The sentence was confirmed by the Supreme Court on 18 December 1972. Such severe sentences resulted in protests from Jan Józef Szczepański, Wisława Szymborska, Jerzy Szacki, Stanisław Lem, Daniel Olbrychski and Catholic authorities. On 19 January 1973 the Council of State reduced Jerzy Kowalczyk's sentence to 25 years in prison.

With the rise of Solidarity in the 1980s, pardons were issued and the brothers were freed for good behavior: Ryszard in 1983 and Jerzy in 1985. In 1991 President Lech Wałęsa decided that their sentences were legally forgotten which would allow them to work again. Still this declaration and following it legal procedure, has not been confirmed by the Supreme Court, which in January 2002 ruled that the conviction of the Kowalczyks could not be appealed, justifying it mainly but not uniquely by the reasons of the legal procedure. The ruling closed the appeal possibilities in this case.
