= Atanas Dalchev =

Bulgarian poet, critic and translator (1904–1978)

- Атанас Далчев
- Born: June 12, 1904; Thessaloniki, Salonica Vilayet, Ottoman Empire
- Died: January 17, 1978 (aged 73); Sofia, People's Republic of Bulgaria
- Occupations: Poet, critic, translator

Atanas Hristov Dalchev (also written Dalčev; Bulgarian: Атанас Далчев) (June 12, 1904 - January 17, 1978) was a Bulgarian poet, critic and translator. He was among the leading Bulgarian poets of the 1920s and 1930s. Dalchev was also a prominent translator of poetry and fiction from French, Spanish, English, German and Russian authors. He was a recipient of the Herder Prize in 1972 (for his overall literary work) and the Znak Pocheta Order (or Order of the Badge of Honor) in 1967 (for popularisation of Russian culture in Bulgaria).

Dalchev was born in Thessaloniki. His father Hristo Dalchev was a lawyer, who as an MP from the People's Federative Party (Bulgarian Section) represented Macedonian Bulgarians in the Ottoman parliament. The family relocated to Sofia in 1913 after the Balkan wars. In 1922 Atanas graduated from Sofia's First Men's High School.

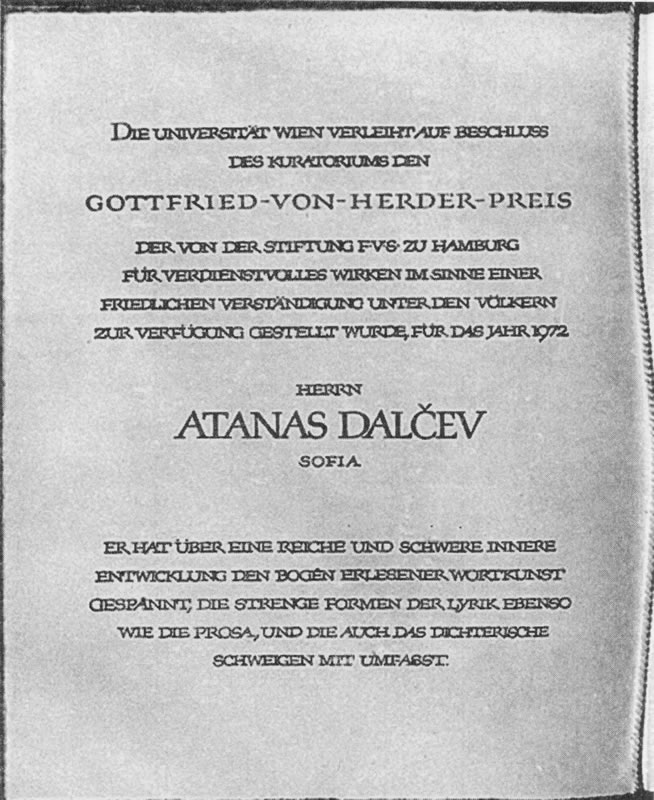
Atanas Dalchev's Herder Prize, 1972

In 1926, Dalchev published his first poetry collection called Prozorets (Window). After graduating in Pedagogics and Philosophy from Sofia University (1927), his next three collections were released in 1928, 1930 and 1943. In 1945 Dalchev was among the first writers to be attacked by the communist establishment in Bulgaria due to his allegedly bourgeois style and artistic concepts. This led to a period of poetic silence, which was broken only after 1956. In the last decades of his life Dalchev created about 25 poems. Instead of successive volumes, his poetry was published in collections where the new works complemented his four pre-war poetic books.

Having entered the Bulgarian literary scene in the 1920s as a member of the Strelets (Saggitarius) literary circle Dalchev was an advocate of commensurating national culture with the values and artistic practices of modern Europe. His poetry and critical articles established himself as a leading opponent to symbolist aesthetics. His works are characterized by a strong emphasis on sensibility and the concreteness of experiences and artistic imagery. At the same time they pose the question of the limitations of the material world, which lead to the popular qualification of Dalchev as a metaphysician in the concrete (метафизик в конкретното).

In 1967 Dalchev published a small book entitled Fragmenti (Fragments) containing aphorisms, thoughts and impressions that originally appeared in various periodicals. Fragments established the author as a prominent aphorist. Known for his nonconformism and despite his modest original production, Dalchev ranks among the greatest authorities in Bulgarian culture of the 20th century, one of the most read and most readable Bulgarian poets, as well as the leading non-institutionalized Bulgarian classic author.

He died in Sofia in 1978. In 1984 the Balgarski Pisatel publishing house released Dalchev's collected Works in Two Volumes, containing his poetry, critics, aphorisms and translations.

Poems and selected aphorisms by Atanas Dalchev have been translated into French, Russian, Polish, Czech, Slovak, Hungarian, German, Italian, French, Spanish, English, Turkish, Chinese, Japanese, Arabian, Swedish and other languages in periodicals and literary anthologies.

== Short bibliography ==
- Prozorets (Window), 1926
- Stihotvoreniya (Poems), 1928
- Parizh (Paris), 1930
- Angelat na Shartar (The Angel of Chartres), 1943
- Stihotvoreniya (Poems), 1965; 1969
- Fragmenti : Belezhki za poeziyata, literaturata i kritikata (Fragments: Notes on Poetry, Literature and Critics), 1967
- Балкон (Balcony), 1972
- Doors selected poems translated by Christopher Buxton, 2018
