= Ostra, Suceava =

Ostra
- Commune
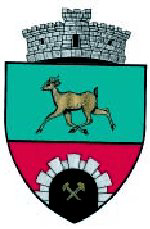
- Coat of arms

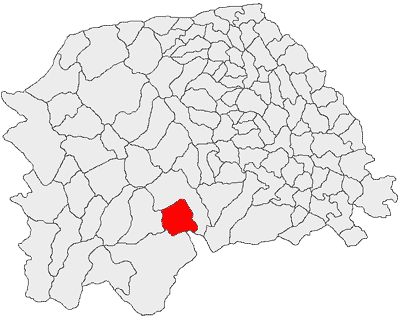
- Location in Suceava County

- Location in Romania
- Coordinates: 47°24′N 25°46′E
- Country: Romania
- County: Suceava

Government
  - Mayor (2020–2024): Ioan Oroș (PNL)
- Area: 101.53 km^{2} (39.20 sq mi)
- Elevation: 708 m (2,323 ft)
- Population (2021-12-01): 2,932
  - Density: 29/km^{2} (75/sq mi)
- Time zone: EET/EEST (UTC+2/+3)
- Postal code: 727400
- Area code: +(40) 230
- Vehicle reg.: SV
- Website: www.primariacomuneiostra.ro

Ostra (German: Ostra) is a commune located in Suceava County, in the historical region of Bukovina, northeastern Romania. It is composed of two villages, Ostra and Tărnicioara.

== Administration and local politics ==
=== Communal council ===
The commune's current local council has the following political composition, according to the results of the 2020 Romanian local elections:

Party	Seats	Current Council
National Liberal Party (PNL)	10	
Social Democratic Party (PSD)	1	
Independent politician (Ailenei Diana-Lăcrămioara)	1	
