= Slătioara (Iza) =

- Location within Romania

Location
- Country: Romania
- Counties: Maramureș County
- Villages: Glod, Slătioara

Physical characteristics
- Source: Țibleș Mountains
- Mouth: Iza
  - coordinates: 47.7854°N 24.1046°E
- Length: 13 km (8.1 mi)
- Basin size: 30 km^{2} (12 sq mi)

Basin features
- Progression: Iza→ Tisza→ Danube→ Black Sea

The Slătioara is a left tributary of the river Iza in Romania. It discharges into the Iza near Strâmtura. Its length is 13 km (8.1 mi) and its basin size is 30 km^{2} (12 sq mi).
