= Manolis Hatzidakis =

Greek art historian

Manolis Chatzidakis
- Born: 1909; Heraklion, Cretan State
- Died: 1 March 1998 (aged 88–89); Athens, Greece
- Resting place: First Cemetery of Athens
- Education: University of Athens; École du Louvre
- Occupations: Museum Curator, Art Historian
- Known for: Post-Byzantine Art Historian
- Spouse: Eugenia Vei

Manolis Chatzidakis (Greek: Μανόλης Χατζηδάκης; 1909 – 1 March 1998) was a Greek Byzantinist. He significantly contributed to the history of art of Greece. He specialized in the field of Byzantine and Post-Byzantine painting. He is considered the 20th century Giorgio Vasari and Bernardo de' Dominici. He was an archeologist, art historian, author, lecturer and curator. He also spoke Arabic and contributed to the field of Islamic art. He helped saved countless artifacts.

Chatzidakis was born in Heraklion. He studied at the University of Athens, he graduated in 1933. He received a doctorate in his field of studies. He was associated with Greek industrialist and founder of the Benaki Museum, Antonis Benakis. Benakis offered him a scholarship to study at the École du Louvre in Paris. He studied with historians Gabriel Millet and André Grabar. Chatzidakis received a degree in Islamic art from the École du Louvre. He also received another degree in the classical Arabic language at the School of Oriental Languages. Hatzidakis was the curator at the Benaki Museum, and later became the director of the institution. At the same time, he served as director of the Byzantine Museum of Athens. He was also the head of Byzantine Antiquities and General Superintendent of Antiquities.

Chatzidakis was bestowed many awards for his work, namely the Order of the Phoenix and Gold Cross of the Order of George I. He was a member of countless organizations. His most notable contribution to Greek art was in the Greek Biographical Dictionary, and the magisterial Greek Painters after the Fall of Constantinople (1450-1830), in which he covered hundreds of hitherto almost unknown Greek painters from 1450 to 1830. He was a major contributor to uncovering and researching the early Cretan work of El Greco relative to the Cretan School. He helped organize and structure the framework of museums in Greece during the 20th century. He was instrumental in organizing the Hellenic Institute of Venice and the National Hellenic Research Foundation.

== History ==
He was born in Heraklion, Crete. He was the son of Gerasimos Hatzidakis. Manolis showed an interest in art from a young age. During his early life, post-Byzantine art was relatively unknown. Greek diplomat and historian Dimitrios Sicilianos was one of the early proponents of the field. He published a book in 1935, called Greek Hagiography after the Fall (1450 - 1800). Hatzidakis decided to study and contribute to Greek art. He studied at the University of Athens. He attended the School of Philosophy. He graduated in 1933, but did not receive a doctorate until 1942. He continued his studies in Europe. He studied with Gabriel Millet and André Grabar in Paris under a scholarship from Antonis Benakis. The Benaki museum was opened in 1930. Hatzidakis was affiliated with the institution while he was studying all over the world. By the 1940s, he was an expert in the field of Islamic art, Byzantine art, and post Byzantine art. He also spoke classical Arabic.

In 1941, he became the director of the Benaki Museum . He remained at this position until 1973. He was also affiliated with the Archaeological Institute of Greece in 1943. He was director of Byzantine research. By 1961, he was special evaluator of Byzantine and Post Byzantine art. Six years later he was the head of research. By the 1950s, the Greek government was in possession of San Giorgio dei Greci and Santi Pietro e Paolo dei Greci, two historic Greek churches in Italy. The Hellenic Institute of Venice was founded to help research post-Byzantine art affiliated with the institution by the Ministries of Education and Foreign Affairs. The collection of the two churches houses over 400 artifacts. Hatzidakis was crucial in contributing to the vast research. In 1953, Hatzidakis was sent to Zakinthos immediately after the earthquake, countless Greek artifacts were lost and destroyed from the fires. Hatzidakis helped save 900 undamaged works of art. He was also part of countless archeological expeditions all over the world.

In 1962, there was a grand exhibition of art organized by the European council. He was appointed secretary-general. The massive exhibition was held in Athens, Greece at the Zappeion, in September 1964. It was titled Byzantine and European Art. Around the same period, he carried out research on Mount Athos, Church of the Holy Sepulchre, Saint Catherine's Monastery, Ionian Islands, Crete and Venice. He was also special representative of the Patriarchate of Jerusalem in the three-member committee for the restoration of the Church of the Holy Sepulchre during the mid-sixties and seventies.

In 1960, he was also the director of the Byzantine and Christian Museum . He was disrupted under the Greek junta they confiscated his passports and removed him from the position. He continued minor duties under the military dictatorship. In 1973, he took over the direction of the Byzantine Antiquities of Athens. When the Greek junta was overthrown, he returned as director of the Byzantine and Christian Museum . He retired one year later.

He was a prominent member of the Greek Archaeological Council. He resigned in protest in 1977, he was 68 years old. The Greek government passed legislation that changed the composition of the council and transferred its responsibilities to the Ministries of Finance and Coordination. In 1987, he published Greek painters after the Fall of Constantinople (1450 - 1830) Volume A, the second version was published in 1997, Greek painters after the Fall of Constantinople (1450 - 1830) Volume B. The books featured hundreds of biographies about Greek painters including Georgios Klontzas, Emmanuel Tzanes, and Michael Damaskinos. He died in 1998. He was buried at the First Cemetery of Athens.

He was a member of countless organizations and institutions. Hatzidakis was secretary of the Society of Byzantine Studies. He also served as secretary and president of the Christian Archeological Society. He was vice president of the board for the Educational Institute of the National Bank of Greece. He was a member of the German Archeological Institute. He received two honorary doctorates from the University of Brussels and Athens. He was an associate member of the Academy of Sciences of Vienna and Belgrade. He was a member of the Academy of Athens in 1980. He was the secretary of the organization from 1981-1990. In 1985, he was appointed chairman of the Organizing Committee of the Byzantine Art Exhibition, he was 76 years old. He taught courses at various educational institutions. He was the principal advisor for the restoration of countless works of art at their laboratories. He was also an advisor at the Byzantine and Post-Byzantine Art Research Center of the Academy of Athens. Throughout his lifetime he was awarded the Order of the Phoenix , Herder Prize (1965), and the Order of George I.

== Literary works ==
- Mystras (Athens, 1956)
- Domenikos Theotokopoulos and Cretan painting
- Greek Painters after the Fall of Constantinople (1450-1830), Volume 1 (1987)
- Greek Painters after the Fall of Constantinople (1450-1830), Volume 2 (1997)
- Byzantine and early medieval painting (1966)
- Images of Patmos (1977)
- The Cretan painter Theophanes. The frescoes of Stavronikita Monastery, (Mount Athos, 1986).
- Byzantine and early Medieval painting (1965)
- Byzantine museum , 1978
- Icons of Saint George of the Greeks and of the Institute's Collection , 1994
- The landscape of the god-trodden Mount Sinai , 1994
- Saint Luke , 1999
- Naxos , 1999
- Patmos , 1999
- Kastoria , 1999
