= Jan Józef Szczepański =

Personal details
- Born: 12 January 1919 Warsaw, Poland
- Died: 20 February 2003 (aged 84) Kraków, Poland
- Resting place: Powązki Cemetery
- Profession: Writer
- Awards: Order of Polonia Restituta, Order of Polonia Restituta, Cross of the Home Army

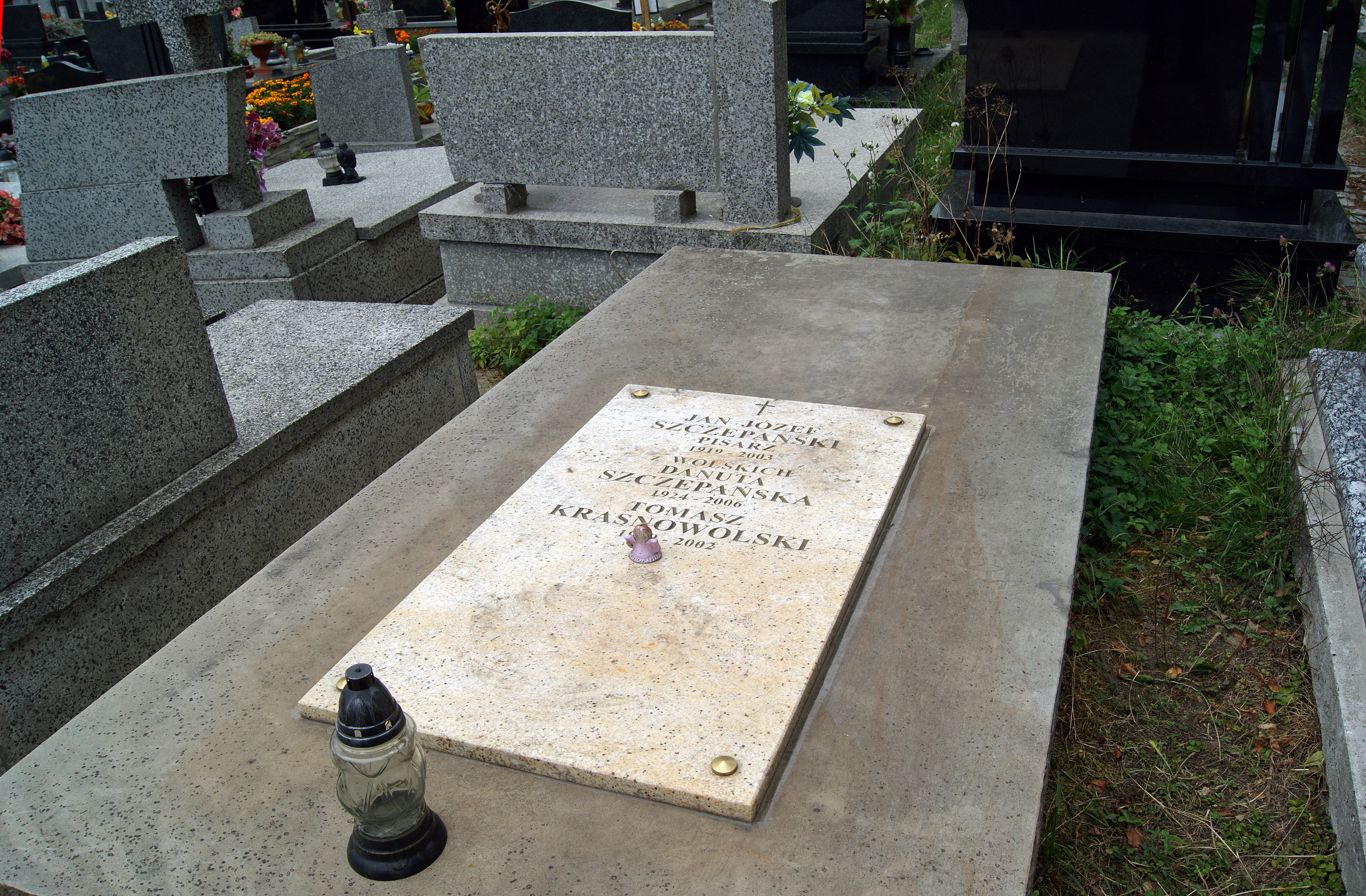
Jan Józef Szczepanski’s grave in Krakow

Jan Józef Szczepański (January 12, 1919 – February 20, 2003) was a Polish writer, reporter, essayist, film scriptwriter and translator, Tatra mountaineer, and traveller. He was the president of the Association of Polish Writers.

== Early life ==
Jan Józef Szczepański was born on January 12, 1919, in Warsaw, Poland. His father was Aleksander Szczepański, diplomat of the Second Polish Republic and economist, associated with the zinc industry of Upper Silesia, brother of Maria Kuncewiczowa, and his mother was Maria Znatowicz-Szczepańska, a French teacher, translator of Serbian literature and publicist.

From the years 1932 to 1937, his family lived in Katowice, where Szczepański attended the boys' State Gymnasium and High School at Mickiewicza Street. Then he studied Oriental studies, graduating in 1947.

== Career ==
He took part in the September campaign in 1939. In 1941, he joined the Military Organization Lizard Union (from 1942 National Armed Forces) and worked in an intelligence unit until 1943, when he became a soldier of the Home Army. In 1944, he fought in the guerrilla movement. He devoted his war prose to this period: a story about the September defeat (Polska Jesień) and guerrilla stories (Buty), in which he critically confronts the legend of the "forest people". War themes were also found in the scripts for Stanisław Różewicz's films (Westerplatte and Wolne miasto).

After the war he joined the "Tygodnik Powszechny"; from the years 1947-1953 he was a member of the editorial board. He was the last president of the Association of Polish Writers, dissolved by the martial law authorities (he documented this period in the book Kadencja). He was one of the founders of the Polish Independence Agreement. In 1978, he also signed the founding declaration of the Society of Academic Courses. He translated into Polish, among others, the prose of Conrad and Greene, Bajki murzyńskie.

He co-signed the Letter of 59 in 1975 and the letter of intellectuals in defense of the brothers Jerzy and Ryszard Kowalczyk in May 1981. On August 23, 1980, he joined the appeal of 64 scholars, writers and publicists to the communist authorities to start a dialogue with striking workers.

He was a keen tourist and, in the first years after the war, a mountaineer. He climbed, for example, with Stanisław Siedlecki (including an attempt to climb the western wall of Łomnica by a new route through Hokejka) and with Krzysztof Tatarkiewicz. Mountaineering, skiing and Zakopane itself appear in several of his books (including Autograf) and in a number of magazine publications. In 1955, he translated John Hunt's book Zdobycie Mount Everestu. His knowledge of the Gorce and Pieniny mountains resulted in the books Portki Odysa and Kipu.

== Personal life ==
In 1947, he married Danuta Wolska.

He was the closest friend of the writer Stanisław Lem and godfather of his son Tomasz. He was the prototype of the character Prother in the novel His Master's Voice.

He died on February 20, 2003, in Kraków, Poland.
