= Strâmtura =

- Commune
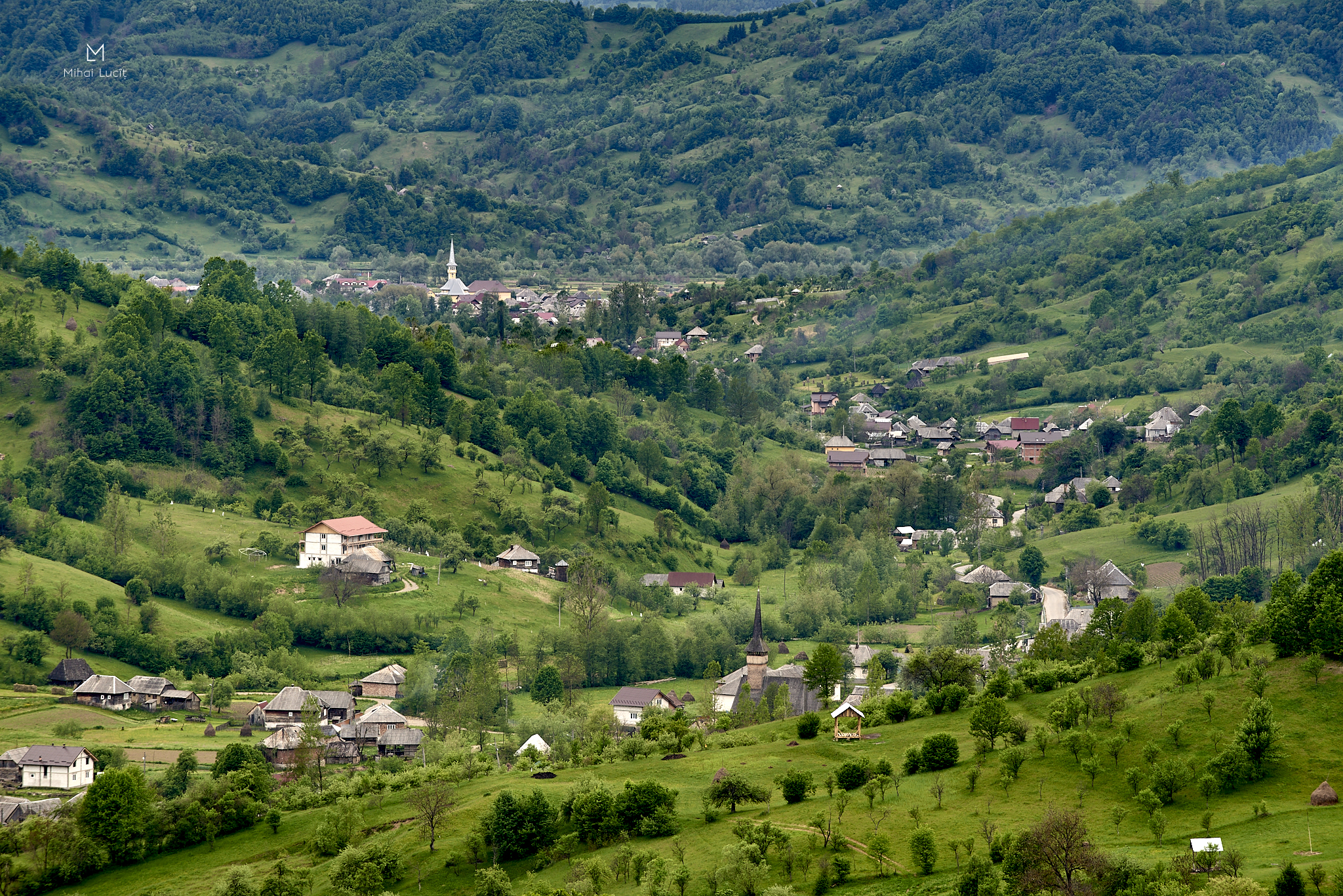
- Strâmtura village

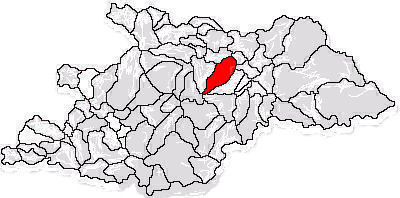
- Location in Maramureș County

- Location in Romania
- Coordinates: 47°46′20″N 24°08′10″E
- Country: Romania
- County: Maramureș

Government
  - Mayor (2020–2024): Ioan Pasere (PNL)
- Area: 91.57 km^{2} (35.36 sq mi)
- Elevation: 336 m (1,102 ft)
- Population (2021-12-01): 3,254
  - Density: 35.54/km^{2} (92.04/sq mi)
- Time zone: UTC+02:00 (EET)
  - Summer (DST): UTC+03:00 (EEST)
- Postal code: 437310
- Area code: +40 x59
- Vehicle reg.: MM
- Website: comunastramturamm.ro

Strâmtura (Hungarian: Szurdok, Yiddish: סטרימטערע, romanized: Strimtere) is a commune in Maramureș County, Maramureș, Romania. It is composed of three villages: Glod (Hungarian: Glód), Slătioara (Hungarian: Izasópatak or Szlatina, Yiddish: סלאטינה, romanized: Slatina), and Strâmtura.

The commune is located in the central part of Maramureș County, 66 km (41 mi) northeast of the county seat, Baia Mare. It is situated at an altitude of 336 m (1,102 ft), in a hilly area on the banks of the Iza River and its tributaries, the Slătioara and Valea Satului rivers.

== Demographics ==
Historical population
Year	Pop.	±%
1880	3,751	—
1900	4,674	+24.6%
1910	5,129	+9.7%
1930	5,243	+2.2%
1956	5,286	+0.8%
1977	5,237	−0.9%
1992	4,889	−6.6%
2002	4,211	−13.9%
2011	3,652	−13.3%
2021	3,254	−10.9%
Source: Census data

At the 2021 census, Strâmtura had a population of 3,254, with an absolute majority (96%) of ethnic Romanians.

== Natives ==
- Mihai Pop (1907 – 2000), ethnologist
