= Vladimír Kompánek =

Slovak sculptor and painter

Vladimír Kompánek (28 October 1927 in Rajec – 20 January 2011) was a Slovak sculptor and painter. He won the Herder Prize in 1967.

Between 1947 and 1949, he studied at the Slovak Technical University in Bratislava, then from 1949 to 1954 at the College of Fine Arts.

His wooden sculptures draw ideas from the rural environment. Kompánek also creates the concept of "protective deities," symbols that appear in his works. Symbols. A frequent motif he uses is a woman field characters and carnival masks. He is also a maker of wooden toys. In 1972, he was registered as an agent of the SBU number 13 293 under the code name Sochar.
