= Stulpicani =

- Commune
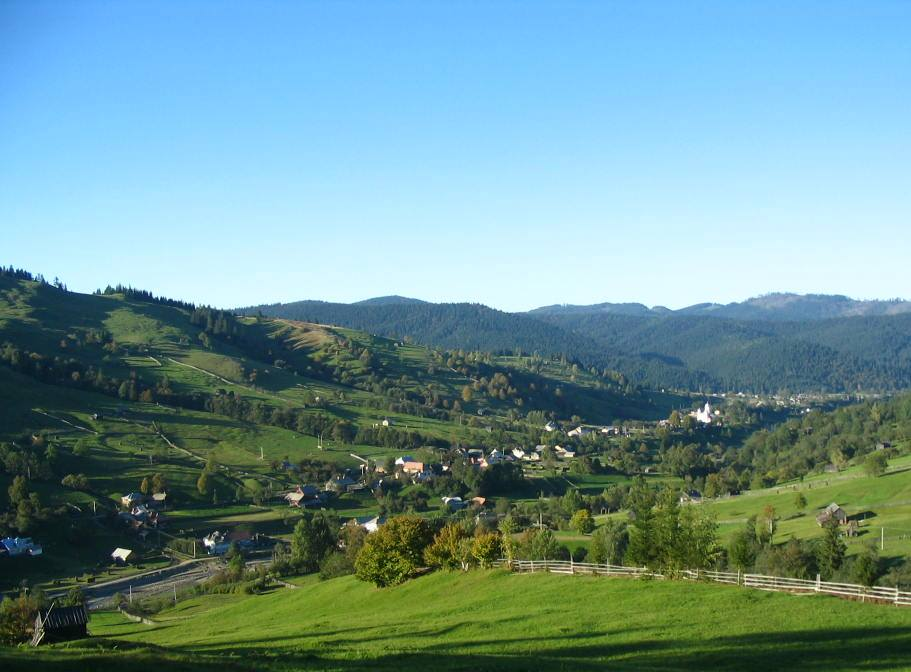
- Rural landscape in Gemenea, Stulpicani

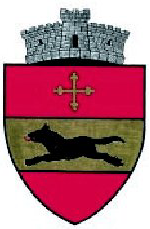
- Coat of arms

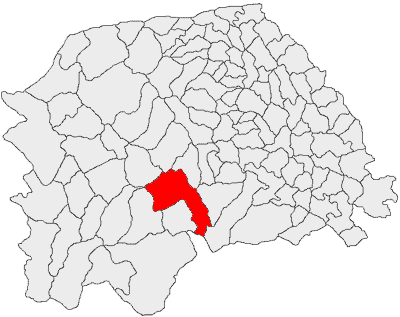
- Location in Suceava County

- Location in Romania
- Coordinates: 47°28′N 25°46′E
- Country: Romania
- County: Suceava
- Subdivisions: Stulpicani, Gemenea, Negrileasa, Slătioara, Vadu Negrilesei

Government
  - Mayor (2024–2028): Vasile Zamcu (PNL)
- Area: 216 km^{2} (83 sq mi)
- Elevation: 570 m (1,870 ft)
- Population (2021-12-01): 5,362
  - Density: 24.8/km^{2} (64.3/sq mi)
- Time zone: UTC+02:00 (EET)
  - Summer (DST): UTC+03:00 (EEST)
- Postal code: 727505
- Area code: (+40) x30
- Vehicle reg.: SV
- Website: www.comunastulpicani.ro

Stulpicani (German: Stulpikany or Sztulpikany) is a commune located in Suceava County, in the historical region of Bukovina, northeastern Romania. It is composed of five villages, namely: Gemenea (German: Dzemine), Negrileasa, Slătioara, Stulpicani, and Vadu Negrilesei (German: Schwarzthal). In the past, from the modern period during the mid 20th century, the commune was inhabited by a sizeable German population, more specifically by Zipser Germans (part of the larger local community of Bukovina Germans).

== Politics and local administration ==
=== Communal council ===
The commune's current local council has the following political composition, according to the results of the 2020 Romanian local elections:

Party	Seats	Current Council
National Liberal Party (PNL)	11	
Social Democratic Party (PSD)	3	
PRO Romania (PRO)	1	

== Gallery ==
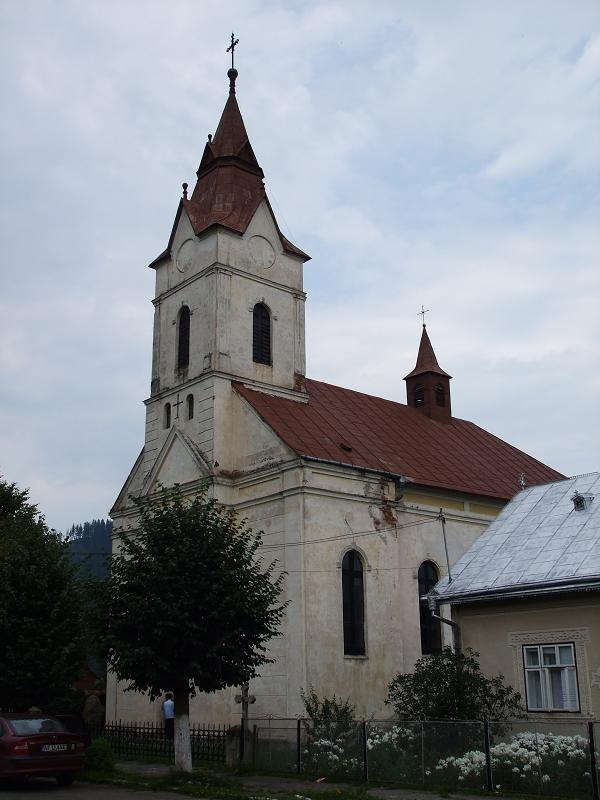
The Roman Catholic church of the bygone Bukovina German community in Stulpicani

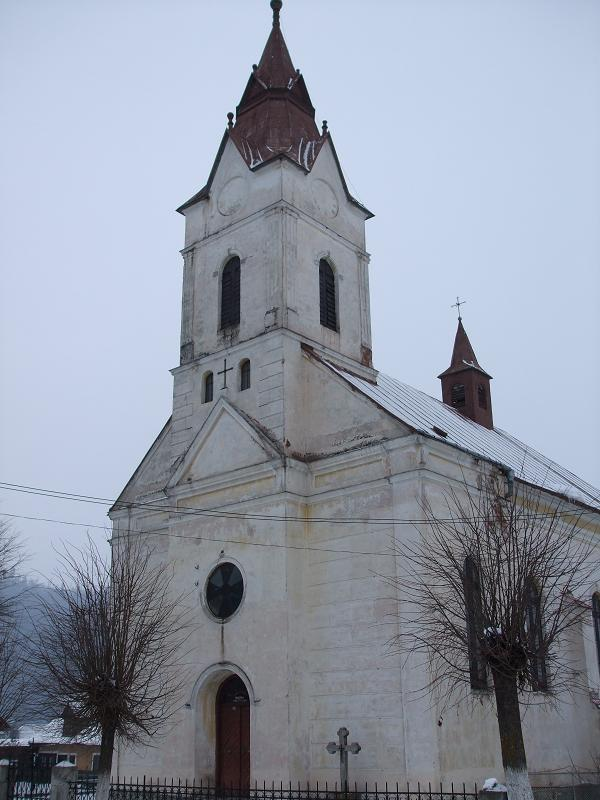
The Roman Catholic church of the bygone Bukovina German community in Stulpicani in winter

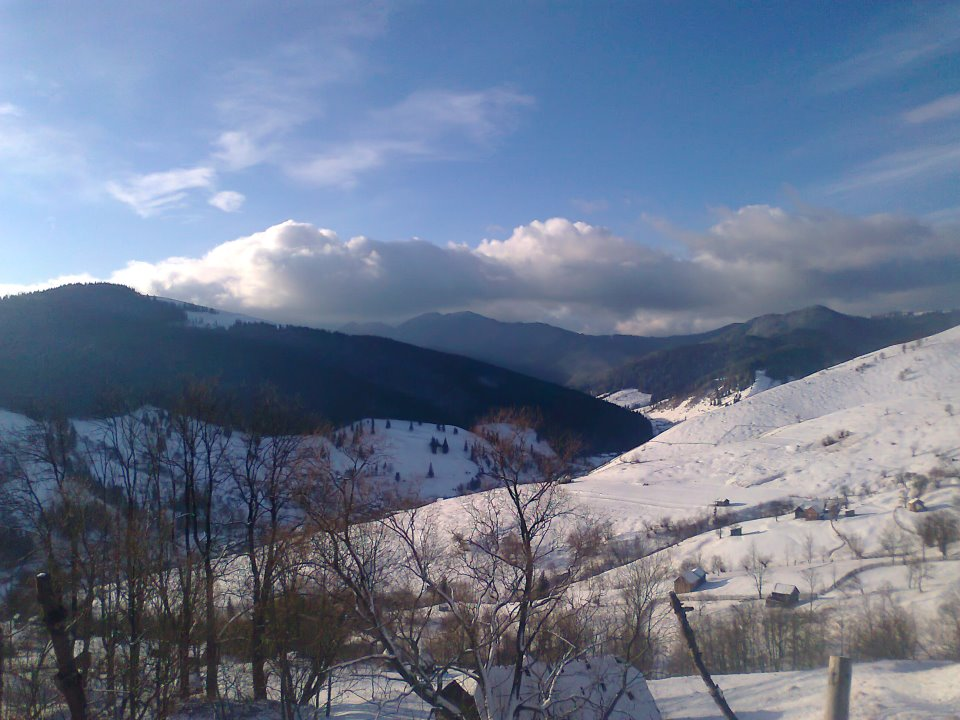
Winter landscape in Gemenea

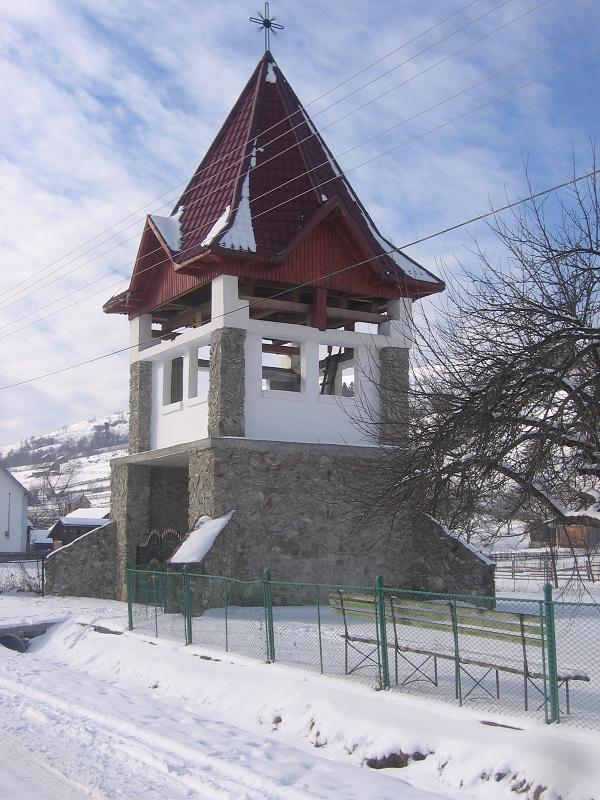
The bell tower in Gemenea

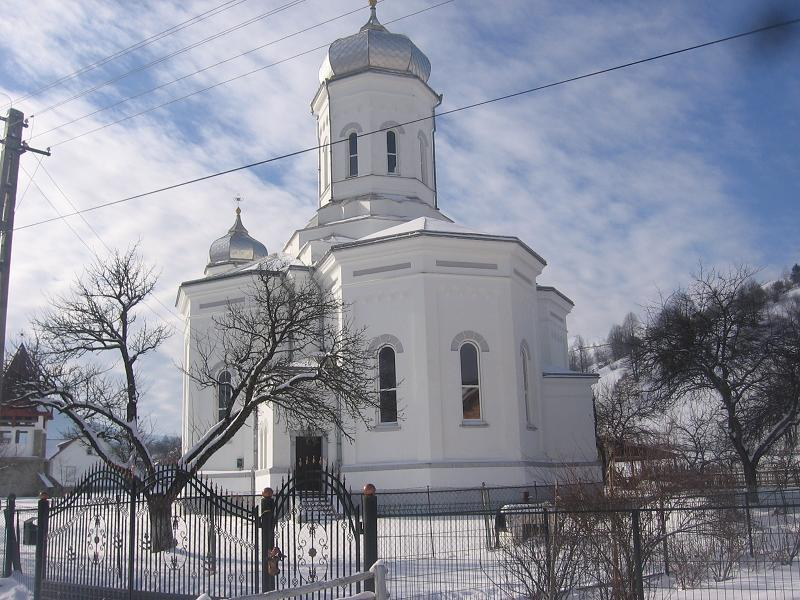
Orthodox church in Gemenea

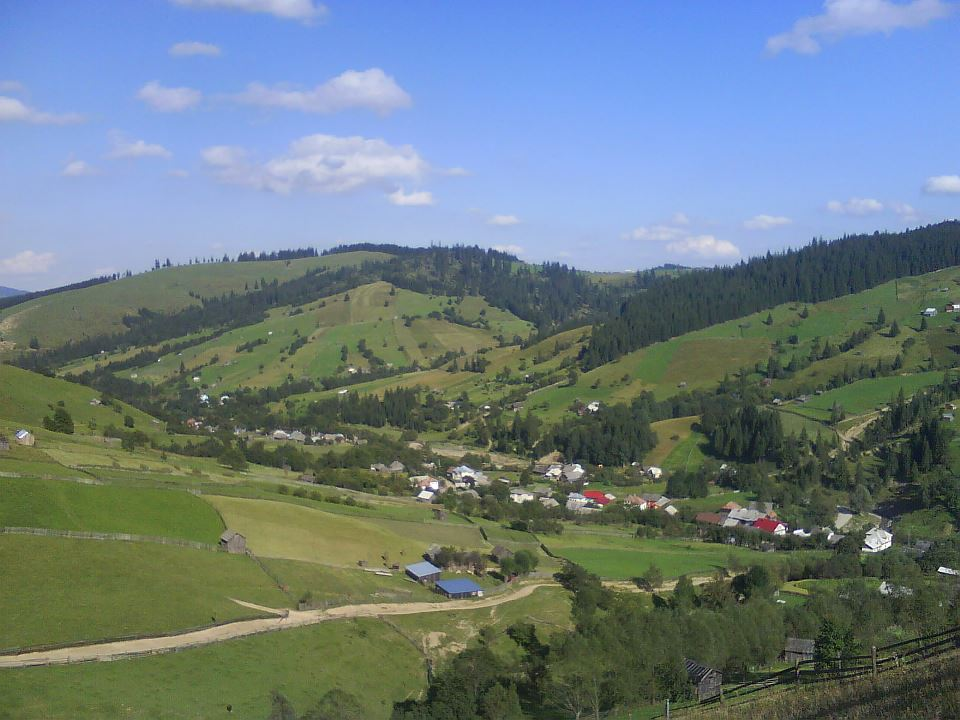
Overview of Gemenea

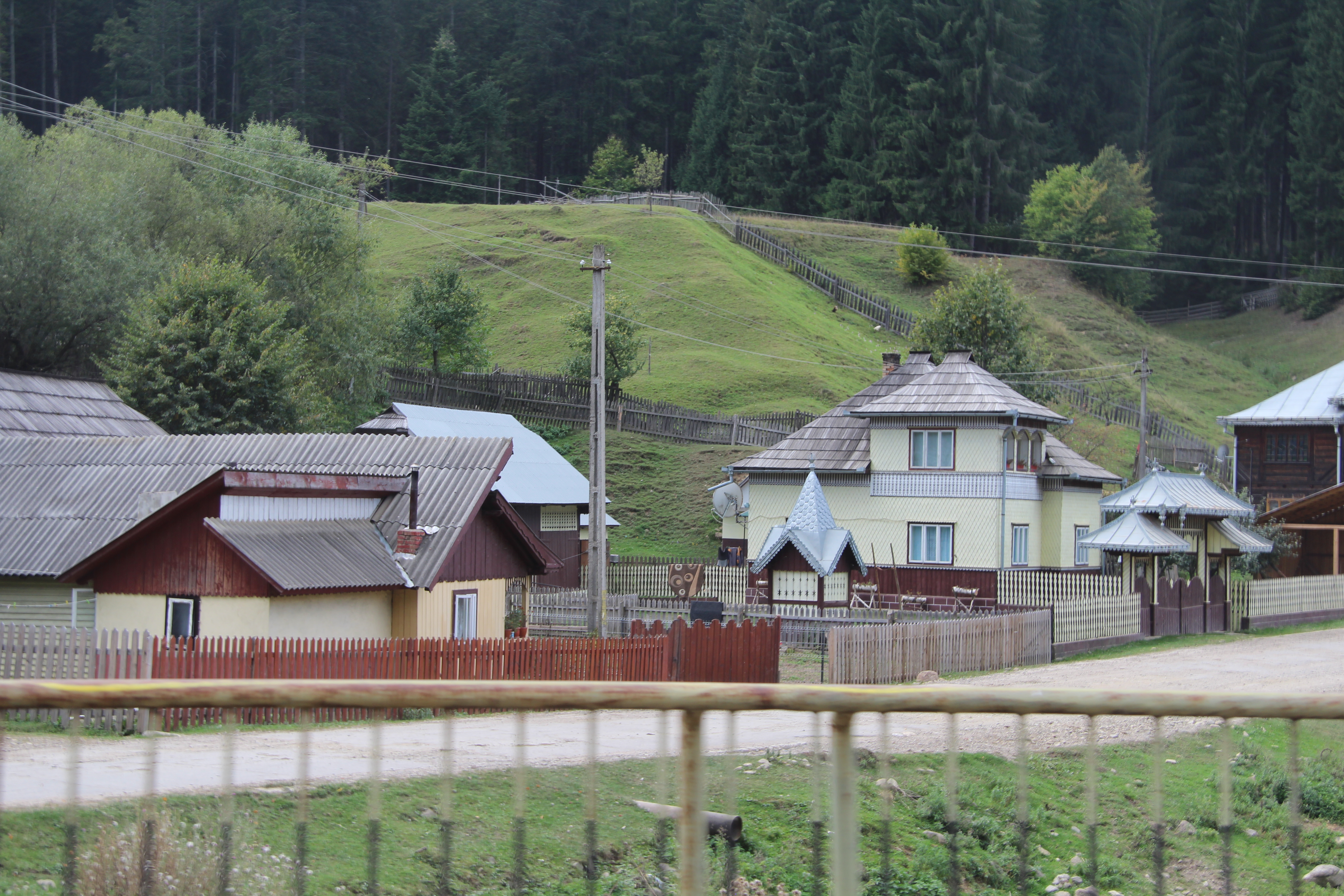
Houses in Slătioara

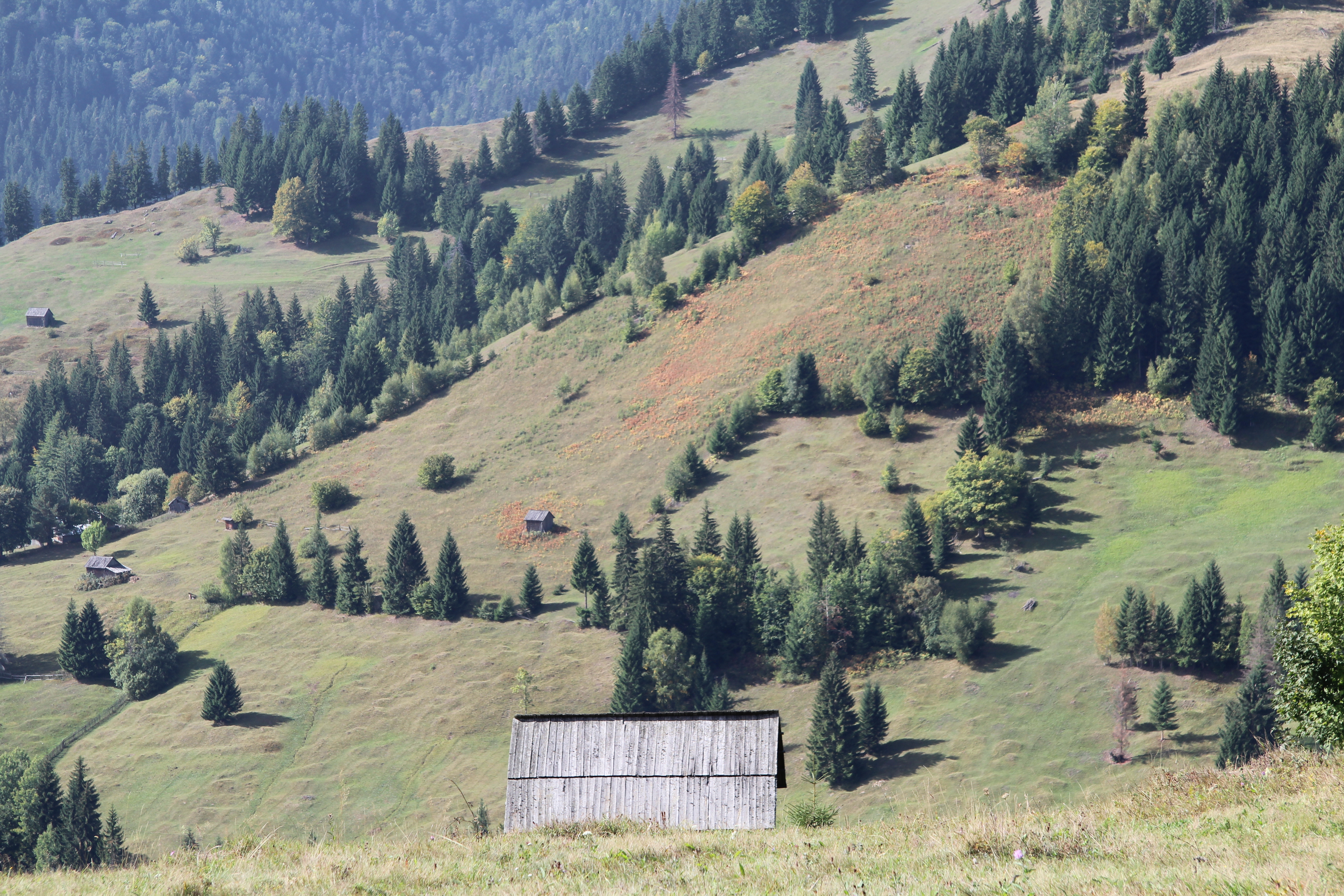
Natural landscape in Slătioara

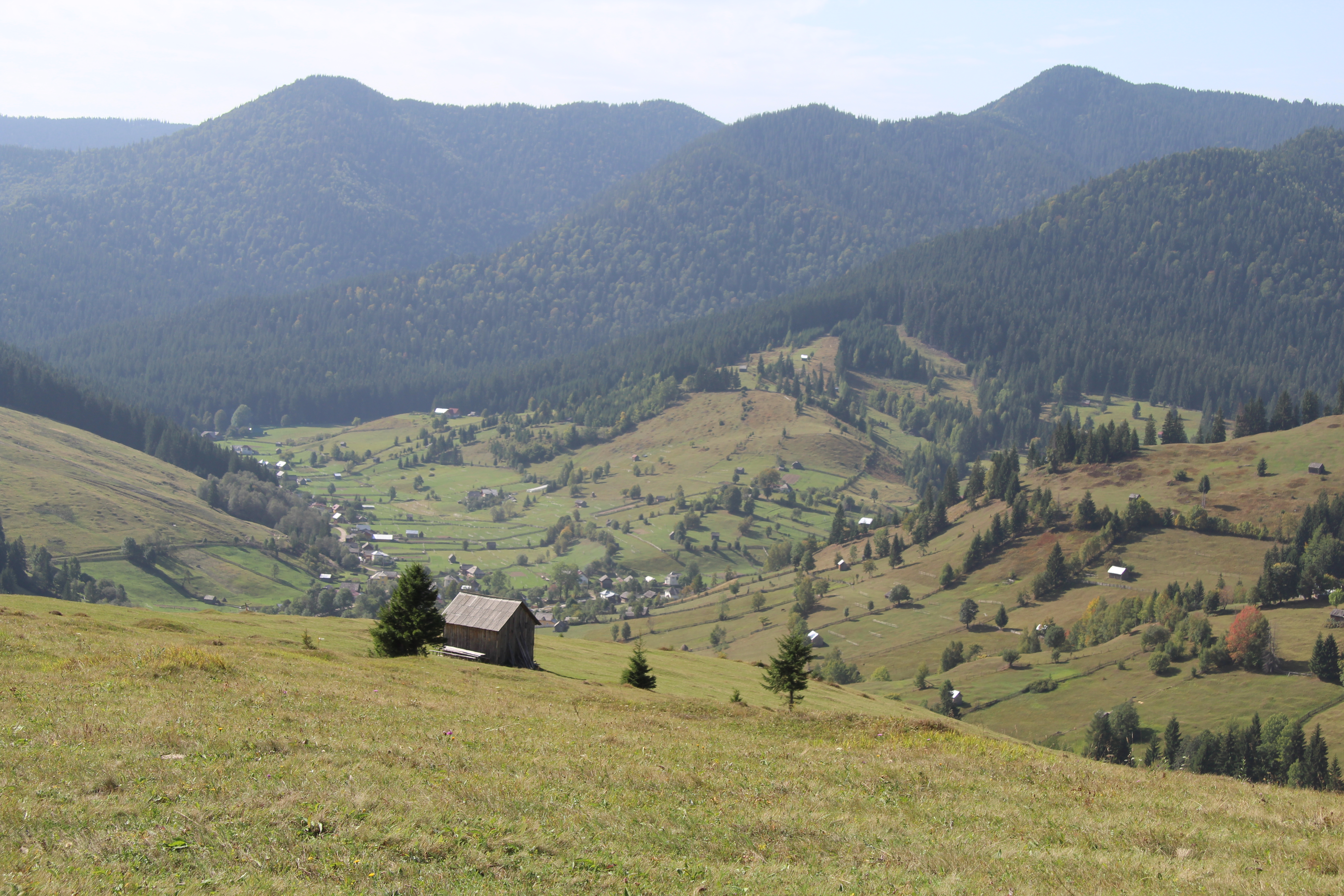
Overview of Slătioara (German: Slavtioara)

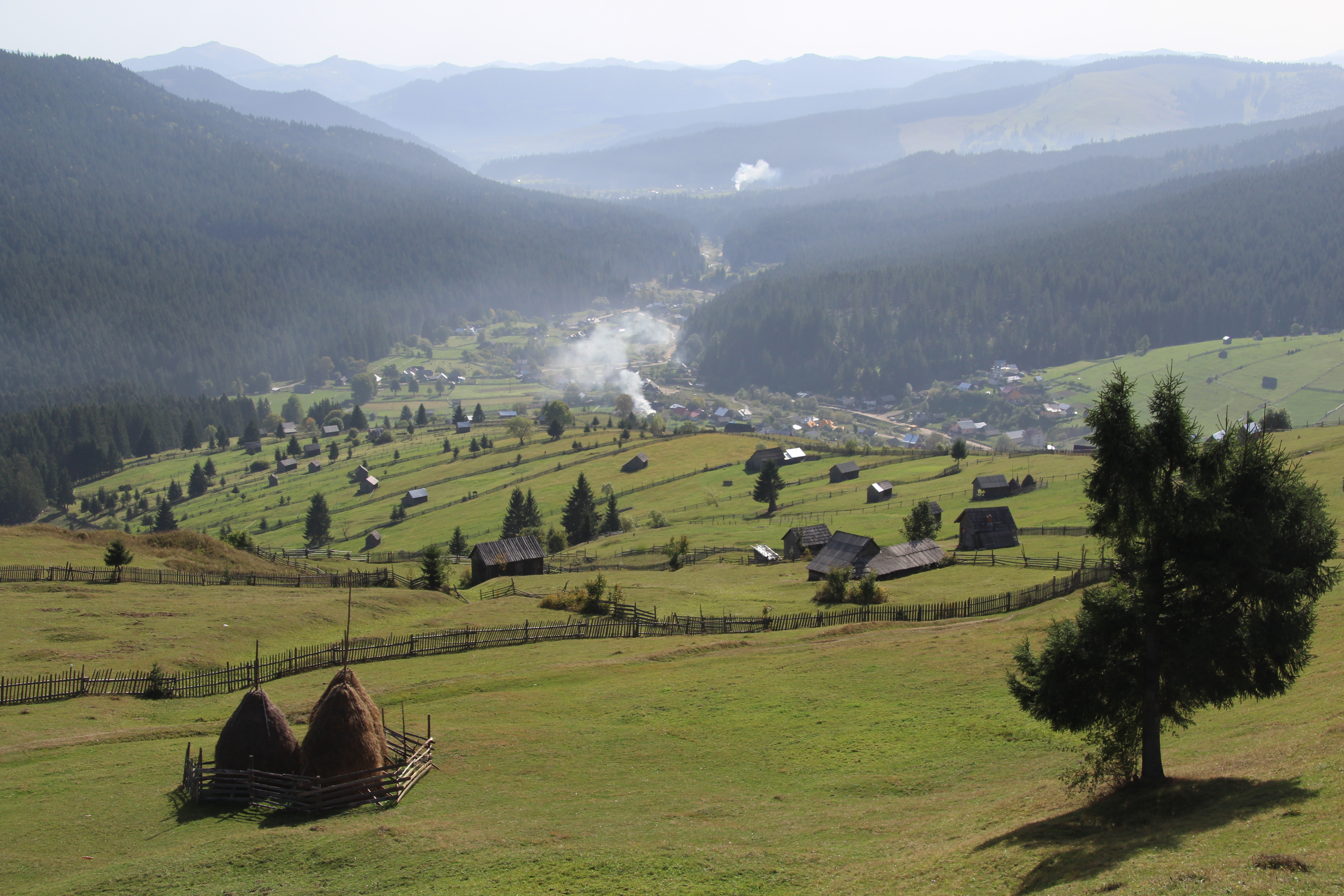
Overview of Slătioara (with its UNESCO-recognized secular forest around), a picturesque Romanian Waldhufendorf
