= List of rivers of Romania: S =

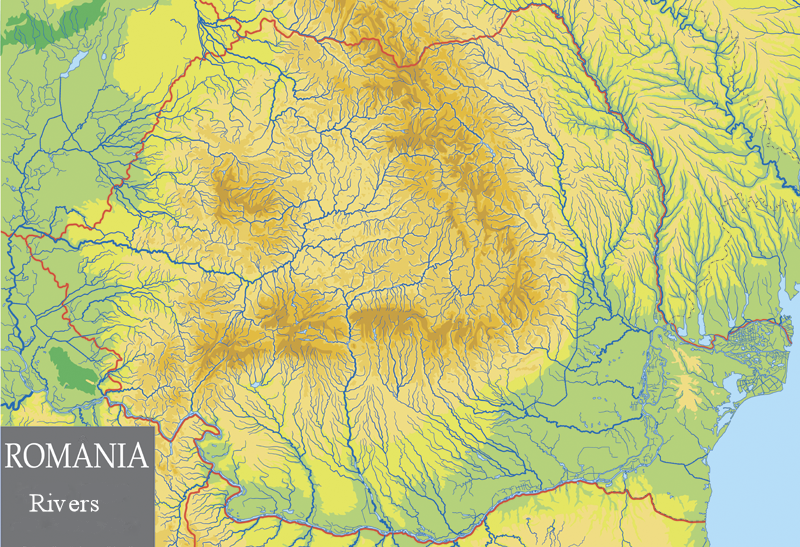
Map of Romania's hydrographic network

== S ==
River	Tributary of
Sabar	Argeș
Sabasa	Bistrița
Saca	Solca
Săcele	Black Sea
Sacherștița	Cerna
Saciova	Covasna
Sacovăț	Bârlad
Săcuieu	Crișul Repede
Sadău	Suceava
Sadova	Moldova
Sadu	Cibin
Sadu	Jiu
Sădurel	Sadu
Șaeș	Târnava Mare
Sâi	Danube
Sălaj	Someș
Sălanele	Sebeș
Sălard	Mureș
Sălaș	Strei
Sălătruc	Someș
Sălătrucel	Olt
Sălăuța	Someșul Mare
Salca	Someș
Salcia	Cricovul Sărat
Salcia	Ier
Sălciuța	Arieș
Săliște	Cibin
Săliște	Crișul Negru
Sâmbăta	Olt
Sâmbotin	Jiu
Sâmnic	Olt
Sâncraiul Almașului	Almaș
Sânmiclăuș	Ier
Sânnicolau	Barcău
Sântă Măria	Almaș
Santău	Ier
Sântioana	Târnava Mică
Săpânța	Tisza
Șapartoc	Târnava Mare
Șapte Izvoare	Bâsca Mică
Șar	Egherul Mare
Șar	Mureș
Sărand	Crișul Repede
Sarasău	Tisza
Sărata	Bașeu
Sărata	Gârla Boul Bătrân
Sărata	Ialomița
Sărata	Mureș
Sărata	Olt
Sărățel	Buzău
Sărățel	Râmnicul Sărat
Saraz	Crișul Negru
Săraz	Glavița
Sârbi	Mureș
Sârbi	Valea Neagră
Sărișorul Mare	Neagra

River	Tributary of
Saroș	Bâsca
Sartiș	Beliu
Săruri	Black Sea
Sărvăzel	Ier
Șasa	Olteț
Săsar	Lăpuș
Săsăuș	Pârâul Nou
Sasu	Strei
Șatra	Rotunda
Săuca	Santău
Săuzeni	Voinești
Săvăstreni	Olt
Săvulești	Iara
Sbanț	Jijioara
Sbârcioara	Turcu
Scânteia	Miletin
Șcheiu	Canalul Timiș
Schit	Bistrița
Schit	Tazlău
Scroafa	Târnava Mare
Seaca	Moldova
Sebeș	Cibin
Sebeș	Drăgan
Sebeș	Mureș (Alba and Sibiu Counties)
Sebeș	Mureș (Mureș County)
Sebeș	Olt (Brașov County)
Sebeș	Olt (Sibiu County)
Sebeș	Sovata
Sebeș	Timiș
Sebiș	Crișul Alb
Secaș	Sebeș
Secaș	Târnava
Secășița	Miniș
Secătura	Izvor
Secu	Neamț
Secuș	Gurghiu
Seinel	Someș
Semeni	Crișul Repede
Semnița	Moravița
Senetea	Mureș
Șerbăneasa	Topolog
Șerbeni	Bunea
Șercaia	Olt
Șercăița	Șercaia
Sericu	Glavacioc
Șes	Pârâul de Câmpie
Șes	Râul Mare
Șeulia	Mureș
Sibiel	Săliște
Sibișel	Orăștie
Sibișel	Râul Mare
Șicasău	Târnava Mare
Sicu	Fizeș
Șieu	Someșul Mare
Sighișoara	Crișul Alb

River	Tributary of
Sighiștel	Crișul Băița
Siliștea	Morișca
Siliștea	Țibrin
Siliștea	Valea Porumbenilor
Silvaș	Strei
Simila	Bârlad
Șimișna	Someș
Șimon	Turcu
Șindrilița	Pasărea
Sinești	Bahlueț
Sinicoț	Mureș
Șipoaia	Timiș
Siret	Danube
Sirețel	Siret
Sirina	Danube
Siriul Mare	Buzău
Șiștarovăț	Mureș
Sitna	Jijia
Slănic	Bratia
Slănic	Buzău
Slănic	Ialomița
Slănic	Trotuș
Slănic	Vărbilău
Slănic de Răzvad	Ialomița
Slatina	Apa Mare
Slatina	Timiș
Slătinic	Motru
Slătioara	Iza
Slava	Lake Golovița
Slăvuța	Amaradia
Slimnic	Coțatcu
Slimnic	Vișa
Slivna	Chineja
Slobod	Bâsca
Snagov	Ialomița
Șoala	Vișa
Soci	Siret
Socolău	Ruscova
Sodol	Bârzava
Sohodol	Arieș
Sohodol	Bârsa
Sohodol	Tismana
Șoimeni	Borșa
Șoimoș	Mureș
Șoimul	Iara
Șoimul	Poclușa
Șoimul	Putna
Șoimuș	Someș
Șoimuș	Valea Roșie
Solca	Suceava
Solocma	Târnava Mică
Solona	Someș
Soloneț	Prut
Soloneț	Suceava
Solonț	Tazlău
Someș	Tisza

River	Tributary of
Someșul Cald	Someșul Mic
Someșul Mare	Someș
Someșul Mic	Someș
Someșul Rece	Someșul Mic
Somonița	Mureș
Șomtelec	Nadăș
Șomuz	Moldova
Șomuzul Mare	Siret
Șomuzul Mic	Siret
Șopot	Nera
Sovata	Târnava Mică
Spaia	Timiș
Spătac	Târnava Mare
Șpring	Boz
Stâmnic	Bâsca Chiojdului
Stăneasa	Olt
Stavnic	Bârlad
Stejar	Mureș
Stemnic	Bârlad
Sterpoaia	Gilort
Știuca	Timiș
Stolniceni	Siret
Strâmba	Mureș
Strâmbu	Sălătruc
Strâmbul Băiuț	Lăpuș
Strehareți	Olt
Strei	Mureș
Studineț	Tutova
Sturza	Putna
Suat	Gădălin
Suceava	Siret
Sucevița	Suceava
Suciu	Lăpuș
Șucu	Bistra Mărului
Șugag	Dobra
Șugău	Iza
Șugura	Trotuș
Suha	Moldova
Suha Mare	Moldova
Suha Mică	Moldova
Suhat	Olt
Suhat	Valea Albă
Suhu	Geru
Suliniș	Mureș
Sulța	Trotuș
Șumuleul Mare	Mureș
Surduc	Apa Mare
Șurgani	Timiș
Șușara	Nera
Suseni	Șușița
Șușița	Jiu (Gorj County)
Șușița	Jiu (Mehedinți and Gorj Counties)
Șușița	Siret
Șuța	Sabar
Sverdinul Mare	Belareca
Száraz-ér (Ier)	Mureș
