= Sinoe =

Sinoe may refer to:

- Greenville, Liberia, the capital of Sinoe County in southeastern Liberia
- Sinoe County, Liberia
- Sinoe, a village in the Mihai Viteazu commune, Constanța County, Romania
- the Sinoe Lake, a lagoon in Constanţa County
- the ancient Greek city of Histria (ancient city), located on the shore of the Sinoe Lake
- Sinoe (moth), a genus of moth in the family Gelechiidae
- Sinoe River
- Sinoe oil field
- Sinoe (mythology)
