= Soci =

Soci may refer to several places in Romania:

- Soci, a village in Pâncești commune, Bacău County
- Soci, a village in Miroslovești commune, Iași County
- Soci, a village in Borca commune, Neamț County
- Soci, a village in Ștefan cel Mare commune, Neamț County
- Soci, a village in Gherghești commune, Vaslui County
- Soci (river), a tributary of the Siret in Bacău County

See also

- Sochi, a city in Krasnodar Krai, Russia
