= Stolniceni =

Stolniceni may refer to places in Romania:

- Stolniceni, a village in Răuseni Commune, Botoșani County
- Stolniceni, a district in Râmnicu Vâlcea, Vâlcea County
- Stolniceni-Prăjescu, a commune in Iași County
- Stolniceni (river), a tributary of the Siret in Iași County

and places in Moldova:

- Stolniceni, Edineț, a commune in Edineț District
- Stolniceni, Hîncești, a commune in Hîncești District
- Stolniceni, a village in Cioropcani Commune, Ungheni District
