= Iara (Arieș) =

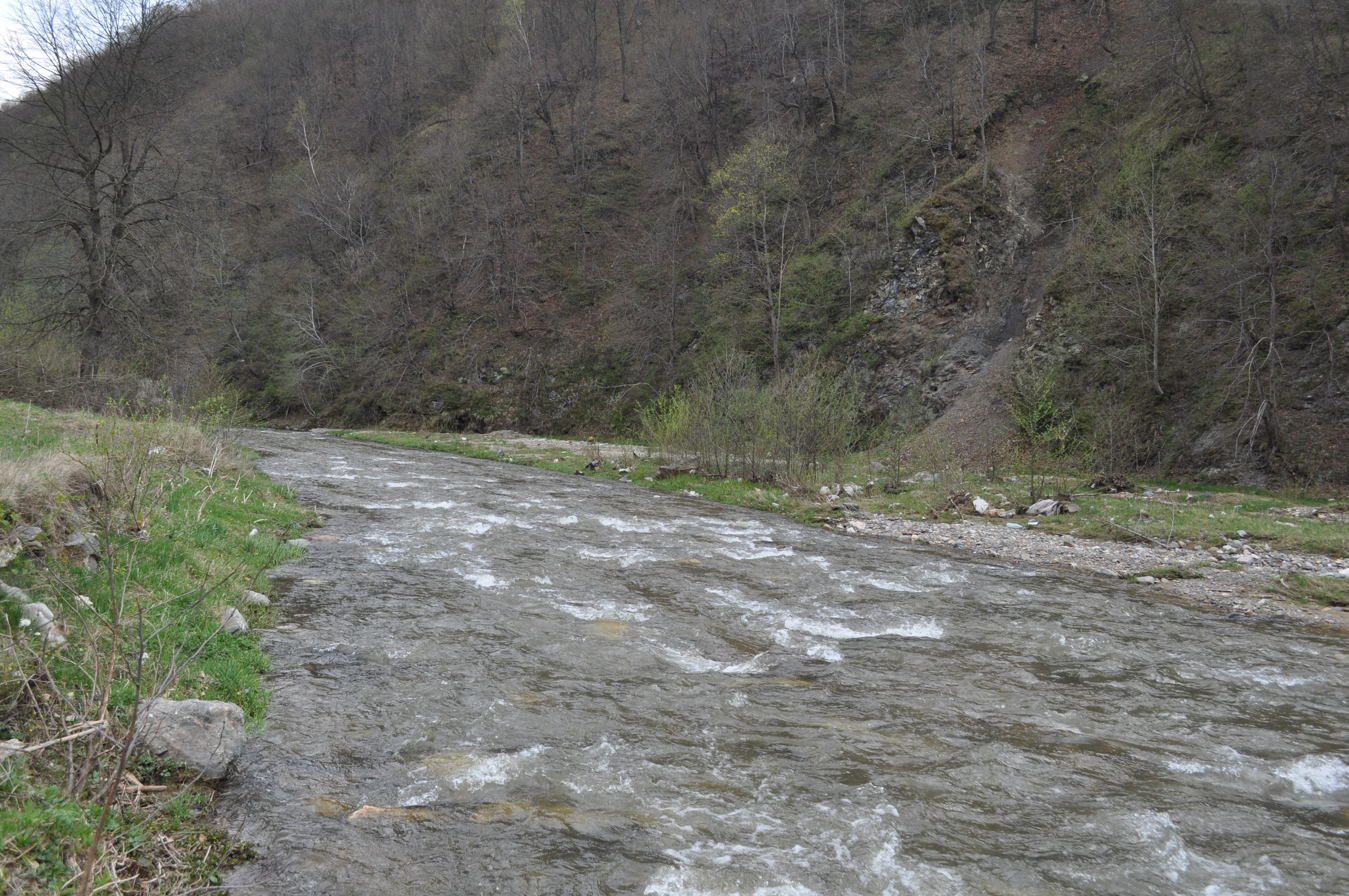

- Location within Romania

Location
- Country: Romania
- Counties: Cluj County
- Villages: Valea Ierii, Băișoara, Iara, Surduc, Buru

Physical characteristics
- Mouth: Arieș
  - location: near Moldovenești
  - coordinates: 46.509°N 23.594°E
- Length: 48 km (30 mi)
- Basin size: 321 km^{2} (124 sq mi)

Basin features
- Progression: Arieș→ Mureș→ Tisza→ Danube→ Black Sea

The Iara is a river in the Apuseni Mountains, Cluj County, western Romania. It is a left tributary of the river Arieș. It flows through the villages Valea Ierii, Băișoara and Iara, and joins the Arieș in Buru. Its length is 48 km (30 mi) and its basin size is 321 km^{2} (124 sq mi).

== Tributaries ==
The following rivers are tributaries to the river Iara (from source to mouth):

- Left: Șoimul, Valea Calului and Agriș
- Right: Măruț, Valea Sălașelor, Săvulești, Ierța and Almășeni
