= Vizma =

Vizma may refer to:

- Vizma Belševica (1931–2005), Latvian poet, writer and translator
- Vizma, Romania, a village in Secaș Commune of Timiș County, Romania
- Vizma, a small tributary of the river Miniș in Timiș County, Romania
- Vizma (Andoga), a tributary of the river Andoga in Vologda Oblast, Russia
- Vizma, Russia, a rural locality (a settlement) in Belozersky District of Vologda Oblast, Russia
