= Săcele, Constanța =

Săcele
- Commune
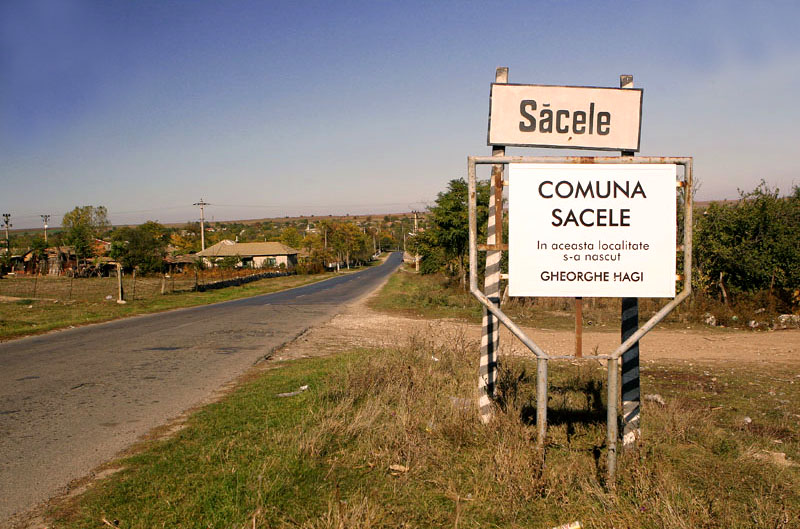
- Entrance sign to Săcele, the birthplace of Gheorghe Hagi

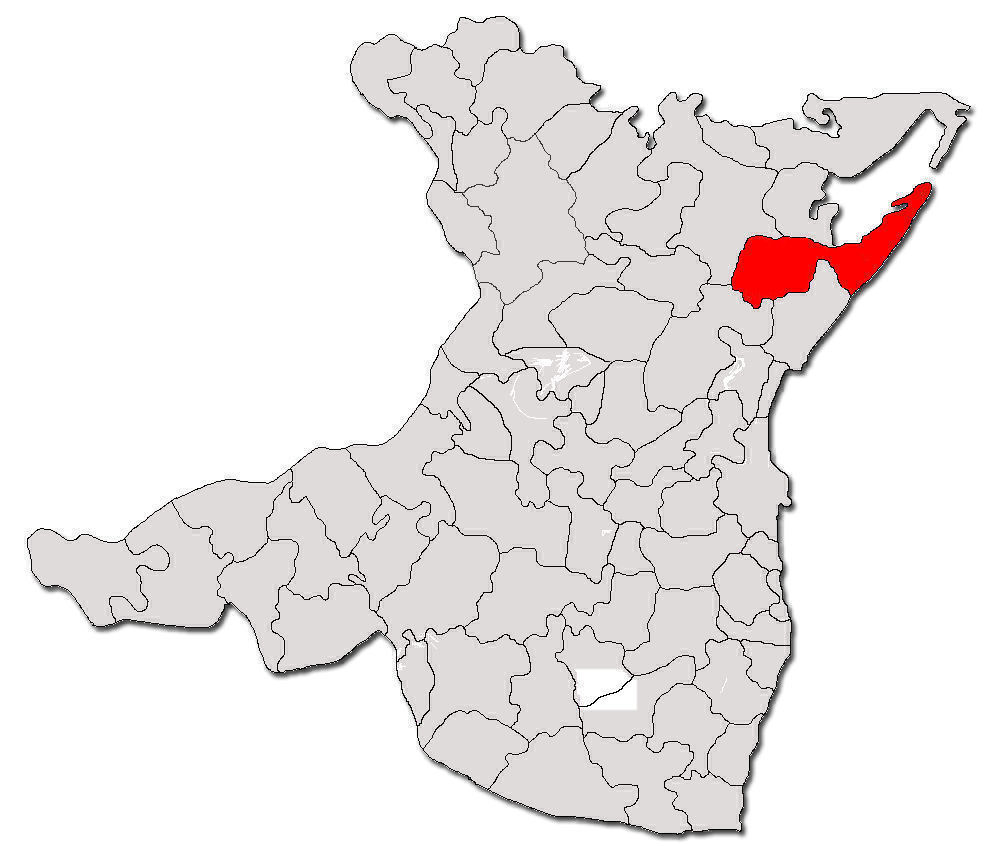
- Location in Constanța County

- Location in Romania
- Coordinates: 44°29′N 28°39′E
- Country: Romania
- County: Constanța
- Subdivisions: Săcele, Traian

Government
  - Mayor (2020–2024): Ion Oprea (PNL)
- Area: 182.07 km^{2} (70.30 sq mi)
- Elevation: 58 m (190 ft)
- Population (2021-12-01): 1,987
  - Density: 10.91/km^{2} (28.27/sq mi)
- Time zone: UTC+02:00 (EET)
  - Summer (DST): UTC+03:00 (EEST)
- Postal code: 907260
- Area code: +(40) x41
- Vehicle reg.: CT
- Website: www.primariasacelect.ro

Săcele (Romanian pronunciation: [ˈsət͡ʃele]) is a commune in Constanța County, Northern Dobruja, Romania, consisting of two villages:

- Săcele (historical names: Peletlia, Turkish: Peletli), named after Săcele, Brașov County.
- Traian, named after the Roman emperor Trajan.

== Geography ==
The commune covers an area of 182 km^{2} (70 sq mi) on the southern side of Lake Sinoe, a lagoon close to the Black Sea. It lies on the banks of the river Săcele, which flows into Lake Tuzla.

Săcele is located in the northeastern part of the county, 47 km (29 mi) north of the county seat, the port city of Constanța, and 30 km (19 mi) from the nearest town, Năvodari. It is crossed by county road DJ226, which connects Năvodari to Mihai Viteazu.

== Demographics ==
At the 2011 census, Săcele had a population of 2,101; of those, 2,027 were Romanians (99.51%), 4 Tatars (0.20%), and 6 others (0.29%). At the 2021 census, Săcele had a population of 1,987 inhabitants; of which 85.86% were Romanians (85.86%), 0.7% other, and the rest unknown.

== Natives ==
- Gheorghe Hagi (born 1965), footballer
