= Săruri =

- Location within Romania

Location
- Country: Romania
- Counties: Constanța County
- Villages: Mihai Viteazu, Sinoe

Physical characteristics
- Mouth: Lake Sinoe
  - coordinates: 44°36′53″N 28°45′44″E
- Length: 11 km (6.8 mi)
- Basin size: 72 km^{2} (28 sq mi)

Basin features
- Progression: Lake Sinoe→ Black Sea
- River code: XV.1.6

The Săruri is a small river in Constanța County, Romania. Near the village Sinoe it flows into Lake Sinoe, a lagoon of the Black Sea. Its length is 11 km (6.8 mi) and its basin size is 72 km^{2} (28 sq mi).
