= Ierța =

- Location within Romania

Location
- Country: Romania
- Counties: Cluj County
- Villages: Muntele Băișorii

Physical characteristics
- Mouth: Iara
  - location: Băișoara
  - coordinates: 46.5767°N 23.4669°E
- Length: 16 km (9.9 mi)
- Basin size: 24 km^{2} (9.3 sq mi)

Basin features
- Progression: Iara→ Arieș→ Mureș→ Tisza→ Danube→ Black Sea

The Ierța is a right tributary of the river Iara in Romania. It flows into the Iara in Băișoara. Its length is 16 km (9.9 mi) and its basin size is 24 km^{2} (9.3 sq mi).
