= Valea Sălașelor =

- Location within Romania

Location
- Country: Romania
- Counties: Cluj County
- Villages: Muntele Săcelului

Physical characteristics
- Mouth: Iara
  - location: Moara de Pădure
  - coordinates: 46.6075°N 23.4186°E
- Length: 9 km (5.6 mi)
- Basin size: 23 km^{2} (8.9 sq mi)

Basin features
- Progression: Iara→ Arieș→ Mureș→ Tisza→ Danube→ Black Sea
- Tributaries
  - right: Huza

The Valea Sălașelor is a right tributary of the river Iara in Romania. It flows into the Iara in Moara de Pădure. Its length is 9 km (5.6 mi) and its basin size is 23 km^{2} (8.9 sq mi).
