= Jieni =

Jieni may refer to several villages in Romania:

- Jieni, a village in Șimnicu de Sus Commune, Dolj County
- Jieni, a village in Rusănești Commune, Olt County

== See also ==
- Shao Jieni, a Chinese-born Portuguese table tennis player
