= Secășița =

- Location within Romania

Location
- Country: Romania
- Counties: Arad, Timiș
- Villages: Labașinț, Secaș

Physical characteristics
- Mouth: Miniș
  - location: Secaș
  - coordinates: 45.8655°N 21.8154°E
- Length: 12 km (7.5 mi)
- Basin size: 20 km^{2} (7.7 sq mi)

Basin features
- Progression: Miniș→ Bega→ Tisza→ Danube→ Black Sea

The Secășița is a right tributary of the river Miniș in Romania. It flows into the Miniș near Secaș. Its length is 12 km (7.5 mi) and its basin size is 20 km^{2} (7.7 sq mi).
