= Secaș (disambiguation) =

Secaș may refer to the following places in Romania:

- Secaș, a commune in Timiș County
- Secaș, a village in the commune Brazii, Arad County
- Secaș (Sebeș), a right tributary of the river Sebeș in Sibiu and Alba Counties
- Secaș (Târnava), a left tributary of the river Târnava in Sibiu and Alba Counties
