= Plămădeală =

Plămădeală is a Moldovan surname. Notable people with the surname include:

- Alexandru Plămădeală (1888–1940), Moldovan sculptor
- Antonie Plămădeală (1926–2005), high-level hierarch of the Romanian Orthodox Church
- Vitalie Plămădeală (born 1985), Moldovan footballer
