= Fundu Văii =

Fundu Văii may refer to several villages in Romania:

- Fundu Văii, a village in Pânceşti Commune, Bacău County
- Fundu Văii, a village in Lipovăț Commune, Vaslui County
- Fundu Văii, a village in Poienești Commune, Vaslui County
