= Patulcia gens =

The gens Patulcia was an obscure plebeian family at Rome. Few members of this gens occur in history, but a number of others are known from inscriptions.

== Origin ==
The Patulcii probably originated at Puteoli in Campania, as evidenced by the large number of inscriptions from that town bearing the name. The derivation of the nomen Patulcius are not immediately apparent; morphologically the name suggests an earlier cognomen Patulcus, which does not appear in inscriptions except perhaps as a rare variant of Patulcius. However, in his discussion of Roman gentilicia, Chase observes that a number of gentile-forming suffixes became stereotyped, so that they were applied to names and other words for which there was no morphological justification. Any connection with the adjective patulus, meaning "broad" or "spreading", is purely speculative.

== Praenomina ==
The chief praenomina of the Patulcii were Lucius and Sextus. Lucius was the most common praenomen throughout all periods of Roman history; Sextus was much more distinctive, but still a common name. A few of the Patulcii used other names, including Quintus, Publius, Gnaeus, and Titus.

== Members ==
This list includes abbreviated praenomina. For an explanation of this practice, see filiation.

- Quintus Patulcius, mentioned by Cicero among those who accused Titus Annius Milo of violence in the affair with Publius Clodius Pulcher, in BC 52. He may be the same Patulcius from whom Titus Pomponius Atticus attempted to obtain the repayment of money owed to Cicero.
- Lucius Patulcius, buried at Buthrotum in Epirus.
- Quintus Patulcius, named in an inscription from Scolacium in Bruttium.
- Patulcius Amarantus, buried at Rome, with a monument from his wife, Julia.
- Patulcia L. l. Ammia, a freedwoman named in an inscription from Rome.
- Sextus Patulcius Apolaustus, husband of Pomponia Chrysis, and foster-father of Sextus Patulcius Eunus, was a soldier buried at Puteoli.
- Patulcia Apta, the wife of Alexander Hispo, a topiarius (gardener) at Rome.
- Patulcia Auge, named in an inscription from Thermae Himeraeae in Sicilia.
- Patulcia Cn. l. Auge, a freedwoman named in a funerary inscription from Rome.
- Patulcius Calidianus, probably the son of Sextus Patulcius Trophimion, buried at Puteoli, aged one year, ten months, twenty-seven days.
- Lucius Patulcius Celsus, named in an inscription from Tarracina in Latium.
- Lucius Patulcius T. f. Celsus, a soldier in the twelfth urban cohort, buried at Rome, aged twenty-three, having served three years.
- Lucius Patulcius Cerdo, one of the patrons of Lucius Patulcius Felix, buried at Puteoli.
- Patulcius Diocles, the son of Diocles, involved in a dispute concerning a tomb at Misenum in Campania.
- Lucius Patulcius Epaphroditus, a freedman named in an inscription from Pompeii, probably dating to AD 40.
- Patulcia Eros, a freedwoman named in an inscription from Pompeii, probably dating to AD 40.
- Patulcia Euche, the wife of Lucius Patulcius Primigenius, for whom she and her sons, Fortunatus, Secundus, and Liberalis, dedicated a monument as part of a family sepulchre at Rome.
- Sextus Patulcius Eunus, foster-son of Sextus Patulcius Apolaustus, two whose memory he built a monument at Puteoli.
- Patulcius Eutychianus, the master of Marcella, who was buried at Carales in Sardinia, with a monument from her husband, Silvanus.
- Patulcia Exoche, wife of Titus Valerius Victor, one of the municipal magistrates at Sutrium in Etruria, to whom she dedicated a monument.
- Lucius Patulcius L. l. Faustus, a freedman buried at Puteoli.
- Lucius Patulcius Felix, named in a funerary inscription from Puteoli.
- Sextus Patulcius Felix, named in an inscription from Herculaneum.
- Lucius Patulcius Fortunatus, named in various inscriptions from Pompeii, dating to about AD 61.
- Sextus Patulcius Hermes, dedicated a monument at Puteoli to his brother, Lucius Laberius Marcianus, who died aged twenty-four years, three months, eleven days.
- Lucius Patulcius Hermia, one of the patrons of Lucius Patulcius Felix, buried at Puteoli.
- Lucius Patulcius Jucundus, the former master of Lucius Patulcius Successus, named in an inscription from Telesia in Samnium.
- Sextus Patulcius Julianus, a native of Puteoli, listed among the cohorts of the vigiles at Rome in AD 143.
- Publius Patulcius Lepos, named in a funerary inscription from Rome.
- Patulcius Pamphilinus, buried at Thugga in Africa Proconsularis.
- Gnaeus Patulcius Phileros, named in an inscription from Thermae Himeraeae.
- Patulcius Phoenix, named in a funerary inscription from Rome.
- Patulcia L. l. Prepusa, a freedwoman buried at Puteoli.
- Lucius Patulcius Primigenius, the husband of Patulcia Euche, and father of Fortunatus, Secundus, and Liberalis, who built a sepulchre for the Primigenius and his family at Rome.
- Lucius Patulcius Primigenius, buried at Puteoli, aged twenty-three.
- Patulcius Primus, buried at Tichilla in Africa Proconsularis, aged eighty-five.
- Sextus Patulcius Sex. f. Primus, listed among the vigiles at Rome, probably during the second century.
- Patulcia Ↄ. l. Sabbatis, a freedwoman named in a funerary inscription from Rome.
- Quintus Patulcius Saturninus, listed among the vigiles at Rome, in an inscription dating to AD 210.
- Titus Patulcius Severus, buried at Russanesci in Dacia.
- Lucius Patulcius Successus, freedman of Lucius Patulcius Jucundus, named in an inscription from Telesia.
- Patulcia Synichia, buried at Puteoli.
- Publius Patulcius Timos, named in a funerary inscription from Rome.
- Patulcia Trophime, named in a funerary inscription from Puteoli.
- Sextus Patulcius Trophimion, probably the father of Patulcius Calidianus, a child buried at Puteoli.
- Patulcius Truphera, named in a funerary inscription from Rome.
- Patulcia Tyche, the mother of Potitus, buried at Fusolae in Campania.

== See also ==
- List of Roman gentes

== Bibliography ==
- Marcus Tullius Cicero, Epistulae ad Atticum.
- Quintus Asconius Pedianus, Commentarius in Oratio Ciceronis Pro Milone (Commentary on Cicero's Oration Pro Milone).
- Theodor Mommsen et alii, Corpus Inscriptionum Latinarum (The Body of Latin Inscriptions, abbreviated CIL), Berlin-Brandenburgische Akademie der Wissenschaften (1853–present).
- René Cagnat et alii, L'Année épigraphique (The Year in Epigraphy, abbreviated AE), Presses Universitaires de France (1888–present).
- George Davis Chase, "The Origin of Roman Praenomina", in Harvard Studies in Classical Philology, vol. VIII (1897).
- John C. Traupman, The New College Latin & English Dictionary, Bantam Books, New York (1995).
