= Felea =

Felea is a Romanian surname. Notable people with the surname include:

- Ilarion Felea (1903–1961), Romanian priest and theologian, Canonized in 2024
- Victor Felea (1923–1993), Romanian poet, essayist, and literary critic
- Irineu Ioan Felea (1885-1944) Romanian priest
- Miron Felea (1896-1980) Romanian Lawyer
- Victor Felea (1892-1981) Romanian Math Teacher
- Traian Felea (1909-1992) Romanian Chanter
- Gheorghe Felea Romanian Major died in 1942 on the front to Odessa
