= Suhat =

Suhat may refer to the following places:

- Suhat, a village in the commune Baimaclia, Cantemir District, Moldova
- Suhat (Câlniștea), a tributary of the Valea Albă in Teleorman County, Romania
- Suhat (Olt), a tributary of the Olt in Olt County, Romania
