= Miniș (Bega) =

- Location within Romania

Location
- Country: Romania
- Counties: Timiș County
- Villages: Ohaba Română, Rădmănești, Secaș, Paniova, Babșa

Physical characteristics
- Mouth: Bega
  - location: Babșa
  - coordinates: 45.7915°N 21.7893°E
- Length: 32 km (20 mi)
- Basin size: 193 km^{2} (75 sq mi)

Basin features
- Progression: Bega→ Tisza→ Danube→ Black Sea
- Tributaries
  - right: Stanovit, Vizma, Guțuni, Secășița

The Miniș is a right tributary of the river Bega in Romania. It discharges into the Bega in Babșa. Its length is 32 km (20 mi) and its basin size is 193 km^{2} (75 sq mi).
