= Sâmnic =

Sâmnic Glod
- Location within Romania

Location
- Country: Romania
- Counties: Vâlcea County
- Villages: Drăgănești, Golești, Aldești, Budești

Physical characteristics
- Mouth: Olt
  - location: Budești
  - coordinates: 45.0625°N 24.3545°E
- Length: 22 km (14 mi)
- Basin size: 88 km^{2} (34 sq mi)

Basin features
- Progression: Olt→ Danube→ Black Sea
- Tributaries
  - right: Sâmnicel

The Sâmnic (also: Glod) is a left tributary of the river Olt in Romania. It flows into the Olt near Râmnicu Vâlcea. Its length is 22 km (14 mi) and its basin size is 88 km^{2} (34 sq mi).
