= Sarasău =

- Commune
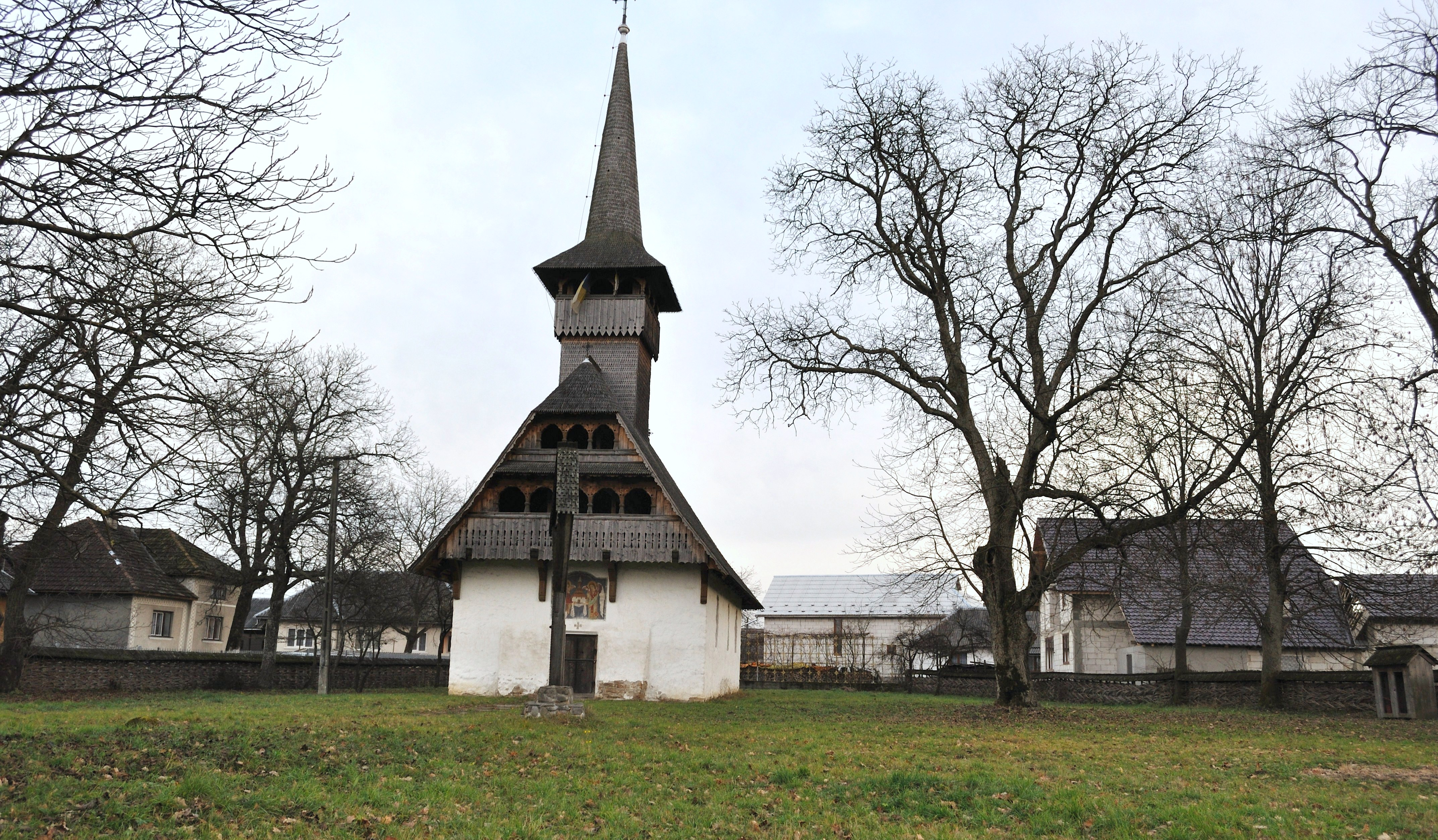
- Church of the Holy Archangels in Sarasău

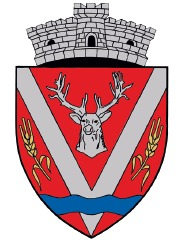
- Coat of arms

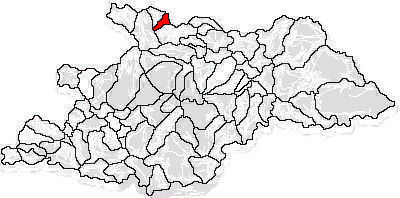
- Location in Maramureș County

- Location in Romania
- Coordinates: 47°57′N 23°49′E
- Country: Romania
- County: Maramureș

Government
  - Mayor (2020–2024): Ion Covaci (PSD)
- Area: 19.52 km^{2} (7.54 sq mi)
- Elevation: 350 m (1,150 ft)
- Population (2021-12-01): 2,433
  - Density: 124.6/km^{2} (322.8/sq mi)
- Time zone: UTC+02:00 (EET)
  - Summer (DST): UTC+03:00 (EEST)
- Postal code: 437265
- Area code: (+40) 0262
- Vehicle reg.: MM
- Website: primaria-sarasau.ro

Sarasău (Hungarian: Szarvaszó) is a commune in Maramureș County, Maramureș, Romania. It is composed of a single village, Sarasău.

The commune lies on the left bank of the river Tisza, on the border with Ukraine, across from Solotvyno; the river Sarasău flows into the Tisza in the village. Sarasău is located in the northern part of the county, 8 km (5 mi) northwest of Sighetu Marmației and 71 km (44 mi) north of the county seat, Baia Mare. It is traversed by national road DN19, which runs from Oradea to Sighetu Marmației.

Historical population
Year	Pop.	±%
1900	1,103	—
1910	1,152	+4.4%
1930	1,568	+36.1%
1956	1,904	+21.4%
1977	2,350	+23.4%
1992	2,444	+4.0%
2002	2,416	−1.1%
2011	2,238	−7.4%
2021	2,433	+8.7%
Source: Census data

At the 2021 census, the commune had a population of 2,433, of which 89.15% were Romanians and 2.22% Roma.
