= Viorel Talapan =

Romanian rower

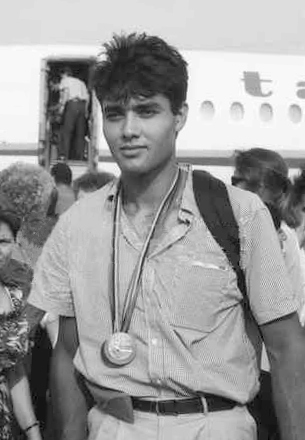
- Talapan in 1992

Personal information
- Born: 25 February 1972 (age 54) Mihai Viteazu, Romania
- Height: 198 cm (6 ft 6 in)
- Weight: 97 kg (214 lb)

Sport
- Sport: Rowing
- Club: CS Dinamo București
Medal record
Representing Romania
Olympic Games
Gold medal – first place	1992 Barcelona	Coxed four
Silver medal – second place	1992 Barcelona	Eight
World Rowing Championships
Gold medal – first place	1993 Račice	Coxed four
Silver medal – second place	1993 Račice	Eight
Gold medal – first place	1994 Indianapolis	Coxed four
Bronze medal – third place	1994 Indianapolis	Eight
Gold medal – first place	1996 Motherwell	Coxed four
Silver medal – second place	1997 Aiguebelette	Eight
Bronze medal – third place	1998 Cologne	Eight

Viorel Talapan (born 25 February 1972, Mihai Viteazu) is a retired Romanian rower. He competed in coxed fours and eights at the 1992, 1996 and 2000 Olympics and won a gold and a silver medal in 1992. At the world championships he won seven medals between 1993 and 1998, including three gold medals.
