= Ovidiu Papadima =

Romanian literary critic, folklorist and essayist

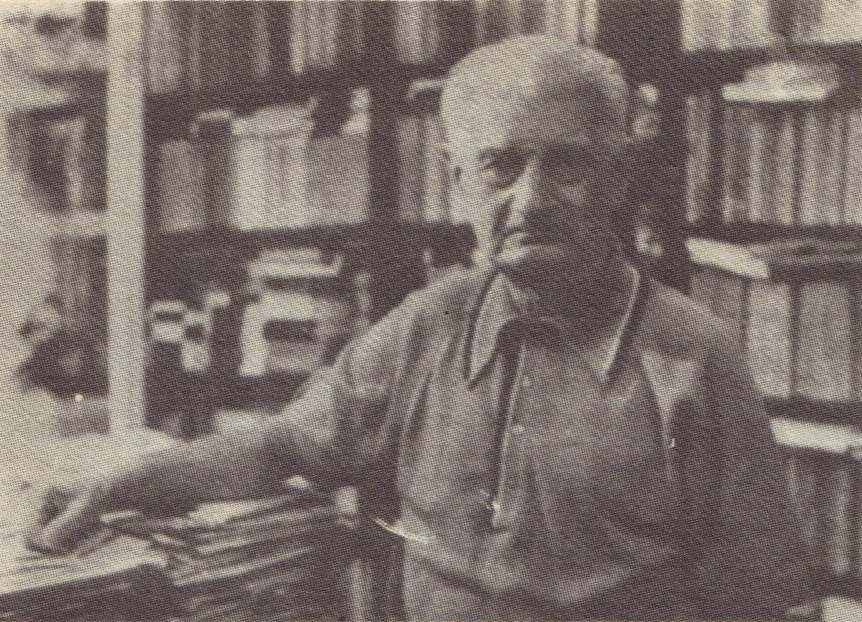
- Born: June 23, 1909; Sinoe, Constanța County, Kingdom of Romania
- Died: May 26, 1996 (aged 86); Bucharest, Romania
- Education: University of Bucharest
- Occupations: literary critic, folklorist, essayist
- Children: Ștefan, Liviu

Ovidiu Papadima (June 23, 1909, Sinoe, Constanța County – May 26, 1996, Bucharest) was a Romanian literary critic, folklorist, and essayist.

He studied at the Alexandru Papiu Ilarian High School in Târgu Mureș, graduating at the top of his class in 1928. He then enrolled in the Faculty of Letters and Philosophy at the University of Bucharest, graduating in 1931.

He made his debut at age 23 in the literary magazine Gândirea, together with Tudor Vianu. He also wrote for Revista Fundațiilor Regale. From 1937 to 1941, he held an Alexander von Humboldt fellowship, sponsored by the Foreign Office of Nazi Germany. He was on the Faculty at the University of Bucharest between 1941 and 1949.

After the establishment of the communist regime, Papadima was arrested in 1952 for "counterrevolutionary activities" and for his writings from the interbellic period (especially at Gândirea). He was imprisoned at Calea Rahovei, Ghencea, Craiova, Poarta Albă (at the notorious Danube–Black Sea Canal), Gherla Prison, and Jilava Prison. Physically exhausted after this experience (his weight dropped to only 44 kg (97 lb)), he was released on October 7, 1955. Prevented from publishing for several years, he was politically rehabilitated in 1971.

He had two sons, Ștefan (1953–2018, a mathematician) and Liviu (b. 1957, also a literary critic).

== Work ==
- O viziune românească a lumii, 1941.
- Neam, sat, oraș în poezia lui Octavian Goga, Bucharest: Fundația Regală pentru Literatură și Artă, 1942.
- Creatorii și lumea lor, 1943.
- Poezia și cunoașterea etnică, 1944.
- Cu cît cînt, atîta sînt: antologie a liricii popular, Bucharest: Editura pentru literatură, 1963.
- Literatură populară Română; din istoria și poetica ei, Bucharest: Editura Pentru Literatură, 1968.
- Ipostaze ale luminismului românesc, Bucharest: Editura Minerva, 1975. OCLC 5252526
