= Șiștarovăț (river) =

Șiștarovăț Sistaróci-patak
- Location within Romania

Location
- Country: Romania
- Counties: Arad County
- Villages: Șiștarovăț

Physical characteristics
- Mouth: Mureș
  - location: Lipova
  - coordinates: 46.0774°N 21.6780°E
- Length: 11 km (6.8 mi)
- Basin size: 59 km^{2} (23 sq mi)

Basin features
- Progression: Mureș→ Tisza→ Danube→ Black Sea
- Tributaries
  - right: Drăuț

The Șiștarovăț (Hungarian: Sistaróci-patak or Sistaroveci-patak) is a left tributary of the river Mureș in Romania. It discharges into the Mureș in Lipova. Its length is 11 km (6.8 mi) and its basin size is 59 km^{2} (23 sq mi).
