= Săvulești =

- Location within Romania

Location
- Country: Romania
- Counties: Cluj County
- Villages: Muntele Bocului, Muntele Filii

Physical characteristics
- Mouth: Iara
  - coordinates: 46.5917°N 23.4401°E
- Length: 12 km (7.5 mi)
- Basin size: 16 km^{2} (6.2 sq mi)

Basin features
- Progression: Iara→ Arieș→ Mureș→ Tisza→ Danube→ Black Sea

The Săvulești is a right tributary of the river Iara in Romania. It flows into the Iara near Băișoara. Its length is 12 km (7.5 mi) and its basin size is 16 km^{2} (6.2 sq mi).
