= Sebeș (Sovata) =

- Location within Romania

Location
- Country: Romania
- Counties: Mureș County

Physical characteristics
- Mouth: Sovata
  - location: Sovata
  - coordinates: 46.5844°N 25.0635°E
- Length: 19 km (12 mi)
- Basin size: 32 km^{2} (12 sq mi)

Basin features
- Progression: Sovata→ Târnava Mică→ Târnava→ Mureș→ Tisza→ Danube→ Black Sea

The Sebeș is a left tributary of the river Sovata in Romania. It discharges into the Sovata in the town Sovata. Its length is 19 km (12 mi) and its basin size is 32 km^{2} (12 sq mi).
