= Săcele (river) =

- Location within Romania

Location
- Country: Romania
- Counties: Constanța County
- Villages: Săcele, Traian

Physical characteristics
- Mouth: Lake Tuzla
  - coordinates: 44.4917°N 28.7090°E
- Length: 10 km (6.2 mi)
- Basin size: 51 km^{2} (20 sq mi)

Basin features
- Progression: Lake Tuzla→ Lake Sinoe→ Black Sea
- River code: XV.1.8

The Săcele is a river in Constanța County, Romania. Near the village Traian it flows into Lake Tuzla, which is connected with Lake Sinoe, a lagoon of the Black Sea. Its length is 10 km (6.2 mi) and its basin size is 51 km^{2} (20 sq mi).
