= Șoimul (Iara) =

- Location within Romania

Location
- Country: Romania
- Counties: Cluj County

Physical characteristics
- Mouth: Iara
  - coordinates: 46.6049°N 23.2845°E
- Length: 17 km (11 mi)
- Basin size: 33 km^{2} (13 sq mi)

Basin features
- Progression: Iara→ Arieș→ Mureș→ Tisza→ Danube→ Black Sea

The Șoimul or Șoimu is a left tributary of the river Iara in Romania. It flows into the Iara near Cerc, Romania. Its length is 17 km (11 mi) and its basin size is 33 km^{2} (13 sq mi).
