= Antonie Plămădeală =

Romanian Orthodox metropolitan

Antonie Plămădeală (Romanian pronunciation: [anˈtoni.e pləməˈde̯alə]; 17 November 1926 in Stolniceni, Lăpușna County, Bessarabia, Kingdom of Romania – 29 August 2005 in Sibiu) was a high-level hierarch of the Romanian Orthodox Church, the Orthodox Metropolitan of Transylvania (1982–2005).

Born Leonida Plămădeală, he received the name of Antonie when he was tonsured a monk in 1948. In 1992, he was elected Honorary Member of the Romanian Academy.

He was friends with the Romanian philosopher Constantin Noica, and spoke at his funeral.

== Memory ==
In 2015, a bust of Plămădeală was installed in the Alley of Ecclesiastical Personalities in Chișinău; it was cast in bronze by sculptor Veaceslav Jiglițchi and placed on a pedestal made of Cosăuți stone, crafted by folk master Veaceslav Lozan.
