= Suliniș =

Suliniș Battai
- Location within Romania

Location
- Country: Romania
- Counties: Arad County
- Villages: Bata

Physical characteristics
- Mouth: Mureș
  - coordinates: 46.0530°N 22.0355°E
- Length: 11 km (6.8 mi)
- Basin size: 24 km^{2} (9.3 sq mi)

Basin features
- Progression: Mureș→ Tisza→ Danube→ Black Sea

The Suliniș (Hungarian: Battai-patak) is a left tributary of the river Mureș in Romania. It discharges into the Mureș in Bata. Its length is 11 km (6.8 mi) and its basin size is 24 km^{2} (9.3 sq mi).
