= Golești, Vâlcea =

Golești
- Commune
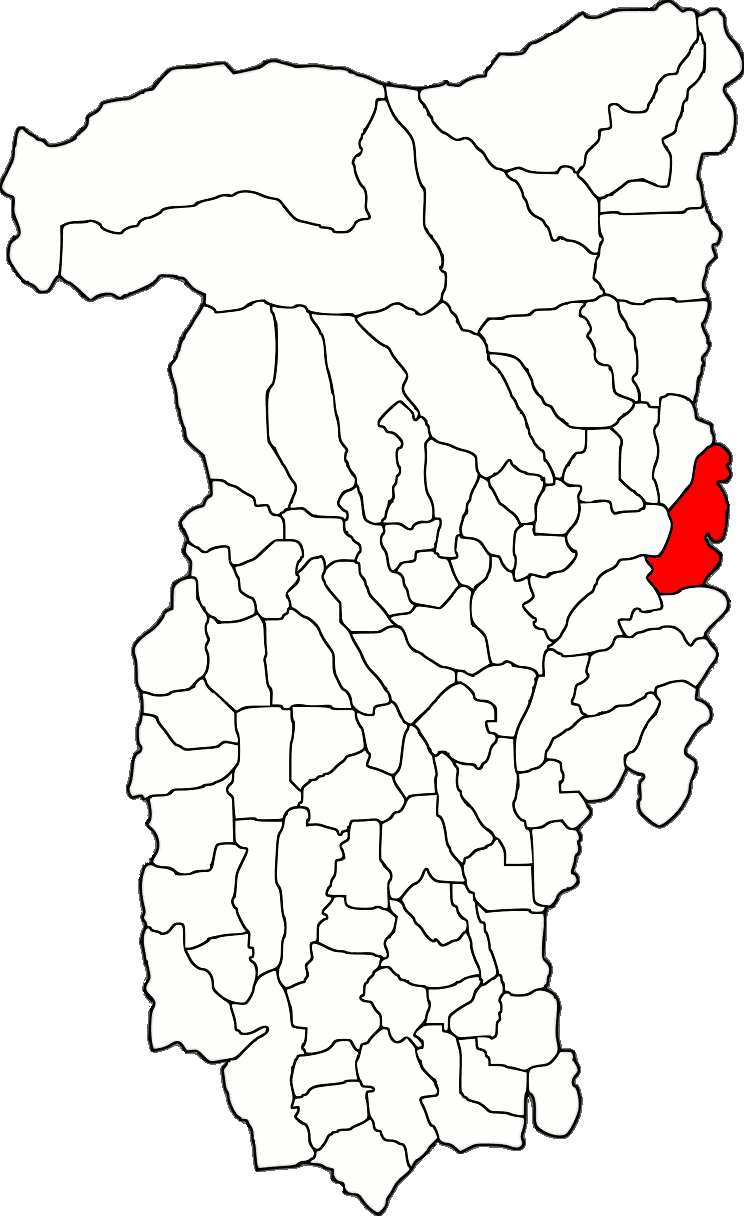
- Location in Vâlcea County

- Location in Romania
- Coordinates: 45°9′N 24°29′E
- Country: Romania
- County: Vâlcea
- Area: 60.73 km^{2} (23.45 sq mi)
- Population (2021-12-01): 2,549
  - Density: 41.97/km^{2} (108.7/sq mi)
- Time zone: UTC+02:00 (EET)
  - Summer (DST): UTC+03:00 (EEST)
- Vehicle reg.: VL

Golești is a commune located in Vâlcea County, Muntenia, Romania. It is composed of eleven villages: Aldești, Blidari, Coasta, Drăgănești, Gibești, Giurgiuveni, Opătești, Poenița, Popești (the commune centre), Tulei-Câmpeni, and Vătășești.
