= Sinoe (mythology) =

In Greek mythology, Sinoe (Ancient Greek: Σινόη, romanized: Sinóe, lit. 'mischievous', Attic Greek: [siˈno.εː], from sínos, σίνος) was a nymph of Mount Sinoe in Arcadia. She was one of the nurse to the infant god, Pan. The latter was then given the surname Sinóeis (Σινόεις, [siˈno.eːs]) after her.
