= Stolniceni (river) =

- Location within Romania

Location
- Country: Romania
- Counties: Iași County
- Villages: Vânători, Gura Bâdiliței

Physical characteristics
- Mouth: Siret
  - coordinates: 47.2940°N 26.7488°E
- Length: 13 km (8.1 mi)
- Basin size: 49 km^{2} (19 sq mi)

Basin features
- Progression: Siret→ Danube→ Black Sea
- Tributaries
  - left: Bâdilița
- River code: XII.1.27

The Stolniceni is a left tributary of the river Siret in Romania. It flows into the Siret in Gura Bâdiliței. The Stolniceni is 13 km (8.1 mi) long and its basin size is 49 km^{2} (19 sq mi).
