= Victor Felea =

Romanian poet, essayist, and literary critic

Victor Felea (Romanian pronunciation: [ˈviktor ˈfele̯a]; 24 May 1923 – 28 March 1993) was a poet, essayist, and literary critic from Cluj (now Cluj-Napoca), Romania, a longtime collaborator with the magazine Tribuna.

Born in the village Muntele Băișorii, Cluj County, he was the son of Greek Catholic priest Toader Felea and his wife Marie. He graduated in 1948 from the Faculty of Letters and Philosophy at the University of Cluj (now part of Babeş-Bolyai University), and took the posts of literary reviewer at the National Theatre Cluj (1949–1950), editor at Almanahul literar, and later at Steaua (1949–1970). He was adjunct editor-in-chief of the magazine Tribuna (1970–1985). From 1949 he was a member of the Writers' Union of Romania.

Felea's first published book was the volume of verse Murmurul Străzii ("The Murmur of the Streets", 1955). He published in the majority of Romania's literary magazines (Contemporanul, Gazeta Literară, Cronica, Orizont, România Literară, etc.), and was awarded the Steaua Literary Magazine Award (1968), the Writers' Union Award (1971, 1983), and the Association of Writers of Cluj-Napoca Award (1975, 1979). His work as a poetry critic is distinguished by the extreme generosity of his reviews and criticism.

== Selected works ==
Among his many volumes of verse were:

- Soarele și liniștea ("The Sun and the Silence", 1958)
- Revers citadin ("Another Face of the City", 1966)
- Ritual solitar ("Solitary Ritual", 1969)
- Sentiment de vîrstă ("Aging", 1972)
- Cîntecul materiei ("The Song of the Matter", Selected Poems, 1973)
- Cumpăna bucuriei ("Moderate Joy", 1975)
- Gulliver (1979)
- De toamnă ("About Falling", 1986)
- Decorul speranţei ("Landscape of Expectations", 1988)
- Jucător de rezervă ("Reserve Player", 1990)

Additional works appeared posthumously:

- Jurnalul unui poet leneș ("The Journal of an Idle Poet", 2000)
- The anthology of selected verses Ritual solitar ("Solitary Ritual", 2001).

His work as a poetry critic is collected in the volumes

- Dialoguri despre poezie, Reflexii critice ("Dialogues about poetry, Critical Reflections", 1968),
- Poezie şi critică ("Poetry and criticism", 1971),
- Aspecte ale poeziei de azi, I-III ("Aspects of today's poetry I-III", 1977–1984).

Felea also published translations of Robert Frost, Marcel Brion, Roy MacGregor-Hastie, and others.
