= Soci (river) =

- Location within Romania

Location
- Country: Romania
- Counties: Bacău County

Physical characteristics
- Mouth: Siret
  - coordinates: 46.3218°N 27.0555°E
- Length: 19 km (12 mi)
- Basin size: 54 km^{2} (21 sq mi)

Basin features
- Progression: Siret→ Danube→ Black Sea

The Soci is a left tributary of the river Siret in Romania. It discharges into the Siret near Pâncești. The basin size of the 19 km (12 mi) long Soci is 54 km^{2} (21 sq mi).
