= Sarasău (river) =

- Location within Romania

Location
- Country: Romania
- Counties: Maramureș County
- Villages: Sarasău

Physical characteristics
- Mouth: Tisa
  - location: Sarasău
  - coordinates: 47.9712°N 23.8257°E
- Length: 8 km (5.0 mi)
- Basin size: 22 km^{2} (8.5 mi^{2})
- Discharge
  - location: Near mouth
  - average: (Period: 1971–2000)0.3 m^{3}/s (11 cu ft/s)

Basin features
- Progression: Tisza→ Danube→ Black Sea

The Sarasău is a left tributary of the river Tisza in Romania. It discharges into the Tisza in Sarasău, on the border with Ukraine. Its length is 8 km (5.0 mi) and its basin size is 22 km^{2} (8.5 sq mi).
