= Sărata (Mureș) =

Sărata Szarata
- Location within Romania

Location
- Country: Romania
- Counties: Mureș County
- Villages: Giuluș, Cipău

Physical characteristics
- Mouth: Mureș
  - location: Cipău
  - coordinates: 46.4473°N 24.2795°E
- Length: 11 km (6.8 mi)
- Basin size: 78 km^{2} (30 sq mi)

Basin features
- Progression: Mureș→ Tisza→ Danube→ Black Sea

The Sărata (Hungarian: Szarata, Szarata-patak) is a left tributary of the river Mureș in Transylvania, Romania. It discharges into the Mureș in Cipău. Its length is 11 km (6.8 mi) and its basin size is 78 km^{2} (30 sq mi).
