= Vânători, Iași =

Vânători
- Commune
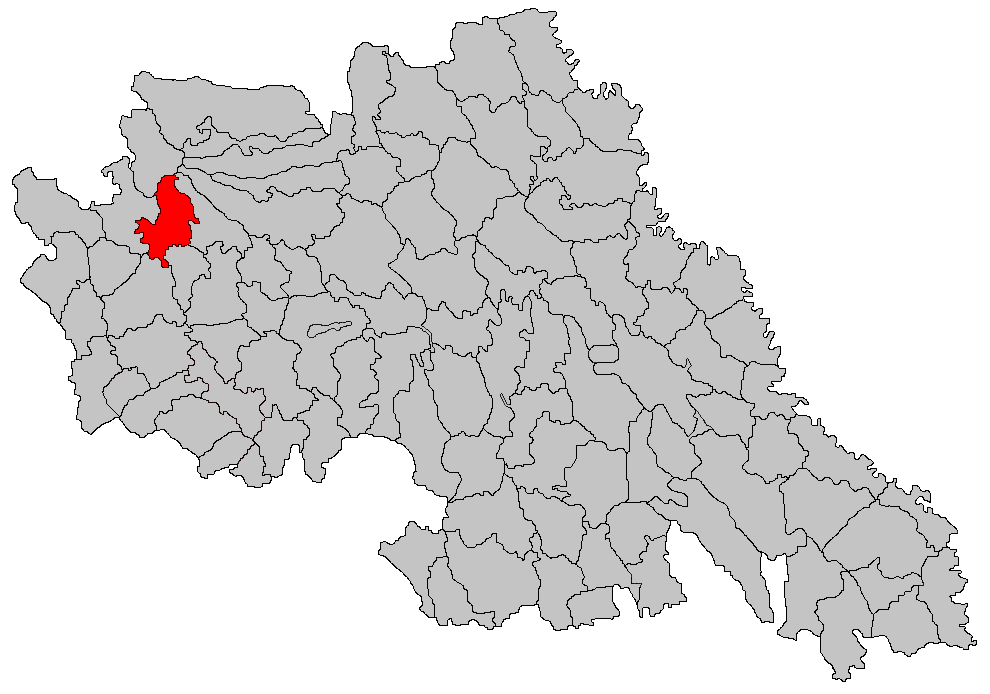
- Location in Iași County

- Location in Romania
- Coordinates: 47°21′54″N 26°45′41″E
- Country: Romania
- County: Iași
- Subdivisions: Vânători, Crivești, Gura Bâdiliței, Hârtoape, Vlădnicuț

Government
  - Mayor (2024–2028): Constantin Lupu (PSD)
- Area: 52.07 km^{2} (20.10 sq mi)
- Elevation: 356 m (1,168 ft)
- Population (2021-12-01): 4,100
  - Density: 79/km^{2} (200/sq mi)
- Time zone: EET/EEST (UTC+2/+3)
- Postal code: 707575
- Area code: +40 x32
- Vehicle reg.: IS
- Website: primariavanatori.ro

Vânători is a commune in Iași County, Western Moldavia, Romania. It is composed of five villages: Crivești, Gura Bâdiliței, Hârtoape, Vânători and Vlădnicuț.
