= Strehareți =

- Location within Romania

Location
- Country: Romania
- Counties: Olt County

Physical characteristics
- Mouth: Olt
  - location: Slatina
  - coordinates: 44.4387°N 24.3305°E
- Length: 11 km (6.8 mi)
- Basin size: 44 km^{2} (17 sq mi)

Basin features
- Progression: Olt→ Danube→ Black Sea
- Tributaries
  - left: Ștreangul
- River code: VIII.1.167

The Strehareți is a left tributary of the river Olt in Romania. It flows into the Olt near the city of Slatina. Its length is 11 km (6.8 mi) and its basin size is 44 km^{2} (17 sq mi).
