= Somonița =

Somonița Szomonyica-patak
- Location within Romania

Location
- Country: Romania
- Counties: Timiș, Arad
- Villages: Groși, Căpălnaș, Valea Mare

Physical characteristics
- Source: Poiana Ruscă Mountains
- Mouth: Mureș
  - location: Valea Mare
  - coordinates: 46.0015°N 22.2276°E
- Length: 20 km (12 mi)
- Basin size: 64 km^{2} (25 sq mi)

Basin features
- Progression: Mureș→ Tisza→ Danube→ Black Sea

The Somonița (Hungarian: Szomonyica-patak) is a left tributary of the river Mureș in Romania. It discharges into the Mureș in Valea Mare. Its length is 20 km (12 mi) and its basin size is 64 km^{2} (25 sq mi).
