= Sovata =

Sovata Szováta
- Town
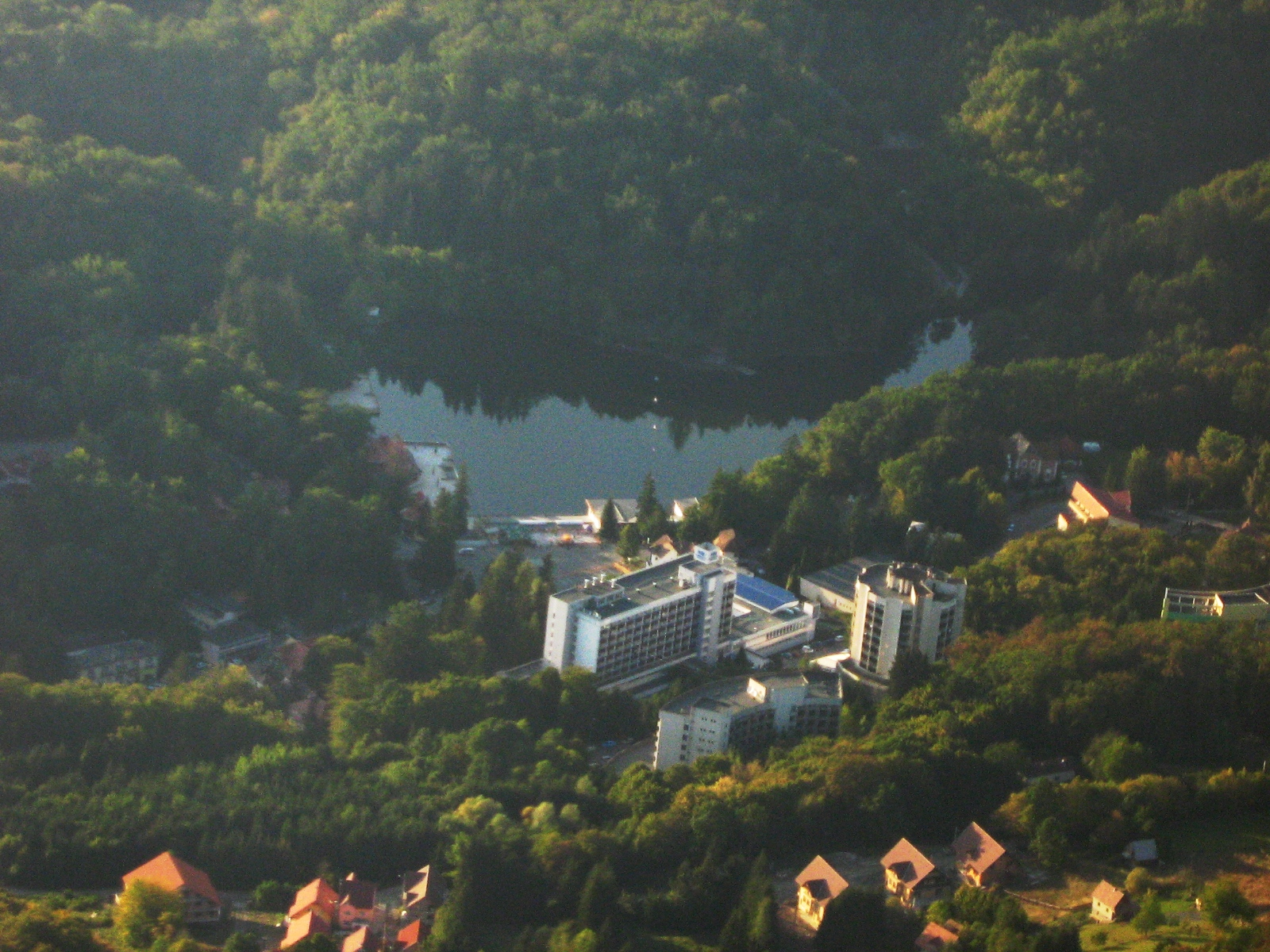

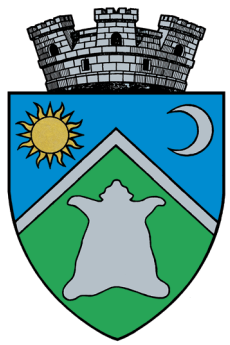
- Coat of arms

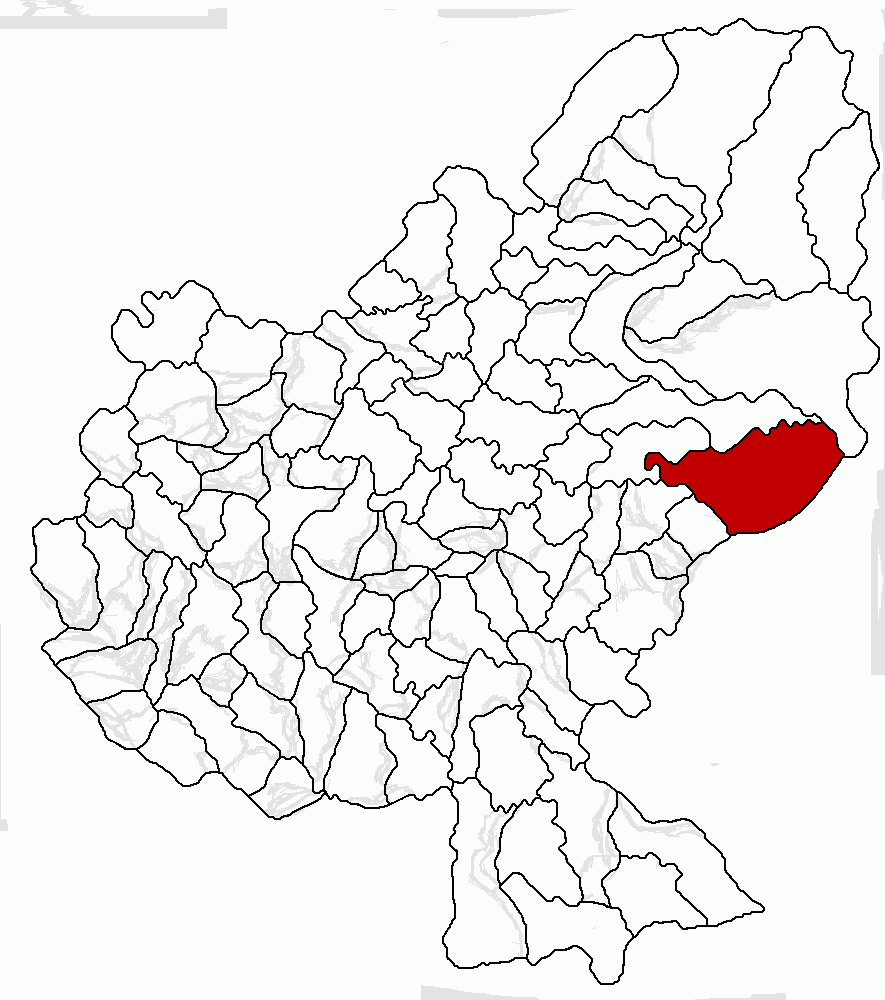
- Location in Mureș County

- Location in Romania
- Coordinates: 46°35′46″N 25°4′28″E
- Country: Romania
- County: Mureș

Government
  - Mayor (2024–2028): László Zsolt Fülöp (UDMR)
- Area: 159.6 km^{2} (61.6 sq mi)
- Elevation: 500 m (1,600 ft)
- Population (2021-12-01): 9,703
  - Density: 60.80/km^{2} (157.5/sq mi)
- Time zone: UTC+02:00 (EET)
  - Summer (DST): UTC+03:00 (EEST)
- Postal code: 545500
- Area code: (+40) 02 65
- Vehicle reg.: MS
- Website: primariasovata.ro

Sovata (Romanian pronunciation: [soˈvata]; Hungarian: Szováta; Hungarian pronunciation: [ˈsovaːtɒ]) is a town in Mureș County, Transylvania, Romania. Three villages are administered by the town: Căpeți (Kopac), Ilieși (Illyésmező), and Săcădat (Szakadát). In 2004, the village of Sărățeni broke away to form an independent commune.

As well as being a spa town, Sovata is on the route of the Via Transilvanica long-distance trail, which also passes through the village of Săcădat.

== Geography ==
The town is part of the Székely Land region of the historical Transylvania province. It is located in the eastern part of Mureș County, on the border with Harghita County; the county capital, Târgu Mureș, is 60 km (37 mi) to the west.

Sovata lies at the foot of the Gurghiu Mountains, at an altitude between 475 and 530 m (1,558 and 1,739 ft). It is situated between the river Corund and the valley of the Târnava Mică. The river Sovata discharges into the Târnava Mică in the town.

Sovata can be reached from Târgu Mureș, Miercurea-Ciuc, and Odorheiu Secuiesc on the DN13A national road and from Reghin on a connection road.

== History ==
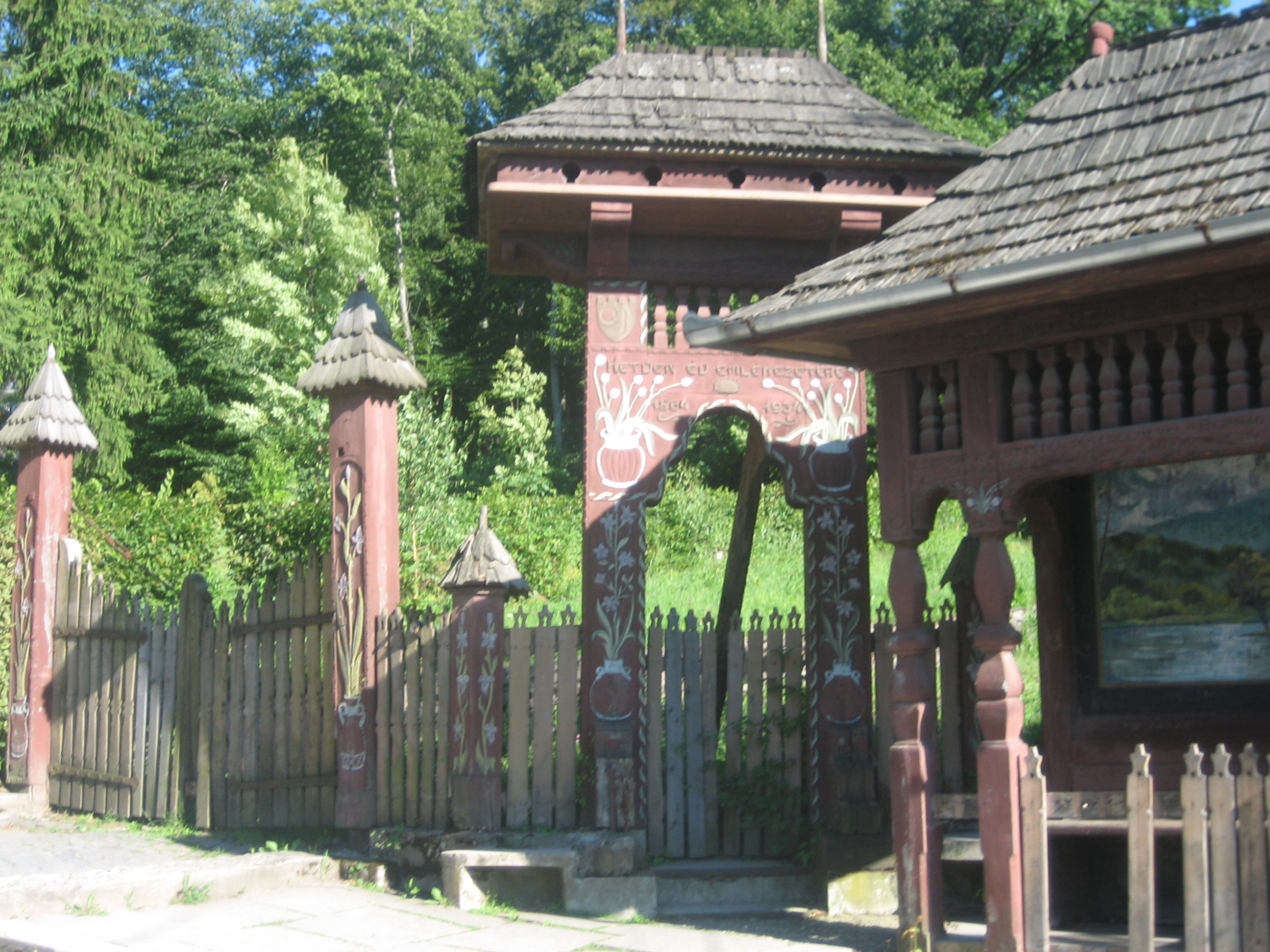
Székely gate

The first data about Sovata are from 1578. By 1583 it was already a village. For 42 years, from 1876 until 1918, the village belonged to the Maros-Torda County of the Austrian-Hungarian Empire.

Due to its salty lakes and warm water it became an increasingly popular health resort during the end of the 19th and the 20th century. It gained the status of town in 1952.

== Demographics ==
According to the 2011 census, the town had a population of 10,385, of which 87.7% were Hungarians, 8.2% Romanians, and 1.9% Roma. At the 2021 census, Sovata had a population of 9,703, of which 82.81% were Hungarians, 8.51% Romanians, and 2.12% Roma.

Demographic movement according to census data:

== Spa ==
The geological events in 1875 gave birth to the Bear Lake, which is unique in Europe, its water being helio-thermal and salty, with purported therapeutic effects for chronic gynaecological symptoms, severe rheumatic pains, peripheral nervous system, and post-accidental motor diseases.

There are four more salty lakes: Nut Lake, Black Lake, Red Lake, and Green Lake. In the interwar period, Sovata became one of the most fashionable spas in the country, visited several times even by the Romanian Royal Family.

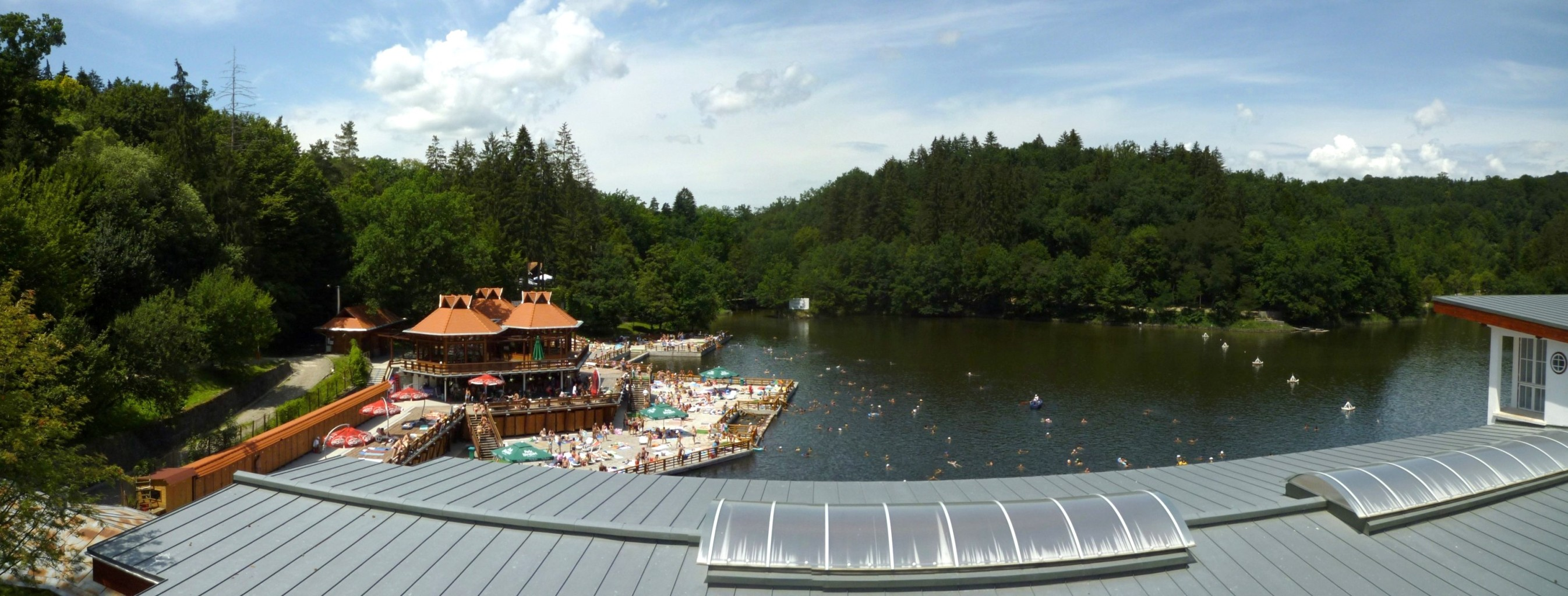
Spa on the Bear Lake

== People from Sovata ==
- Nahum (Nachum) Gantz Ostolish (1926–2005), a Knesset (parliamentary) candidate, local head of Mapai party and moshav (type of farm) movement and co-founder of Kfar Ahim moshav , Israel, father of Benny Gantz, leading Israeli politician

== Sister cities ==
- Angyalföld (Budapest), Hungary
- Csopak, Hungary
- Dunavecse, Hungary
- Kőröshegy, Hungary
- Mezőberény, Hungary
- Ságvár, Hungary
- Sümeg, Hungary
- Százhalombatta, Hungary
- Tata, Hungary
