= Sovata (river) =

- Location within Romania

Location
- Country: Romania
- Counties: Mureș County
- Villages: Sovata

Physical characteristics
- Mouth: Târnava Mică
  - coordinates: 46.5788°N 25.0496°E
- Length: 21 km (13 mi)
- Basin size: 125 km^{2} (48 sq mi)

Basin features
- Progression: Târnava Mică→ Târnava→ Mureș→ Tisza→ Danube→ Black Sea
- Tributaries
  - left: Sebeș
  - right: Săcădat

The Sovata is a right tributary of the river Târnava Mică in Romania. It discharges into the Târnava Mică in Sovata. Its length is 21 km (13 mi) and its basin size is 125 km^{2} (48 sq mi).
