= Sinicoț =

- Location within Romania

Location
- Country: Romania
- Counties: Arad County
- Villages: Neudorf

Physical characteristics
- Mouth: Mureș
  - location: Păuliș
  - coordinates: 46.1097°N 21.5676°E
- Length: 14 km (8.7 mi)
- Basin size: 38 km^{2} (15 sq mi)

Basin features
- Progression: Mureș→ Tisza→ Danube→ Black Sea

The Sinicoț is a left tributary of the river Mureș in Romania. It discharges into the Mureș in Păuliș. Its length is 14 km (8.7 mi) and its basin size is 38 km^{2} (15 sq mi).
