= Suhat (Olt) =

- Location within Romania

Location
- Country: Romania
- Counties: Olt County
- Villages: Studina, Rusănești

Physical characteristics
- Mouth: Olt
  - location: Rusănești
  - coordinates: 43.9517°N 24.6001°E
- Length: 33 km (21 mi)
- Basin size: 149 km^{2} (58 sq mi)

Basin features
- Progression: Olt→ Danube→ Black Sea
- Tributaries
  - right: Valea Grădinilor
- River code: VIII.1.178

The Suhat is a right tributary of the river Olt in Romania. It flows into the Olt in Rusănești. Its length is 33 km (21 mi) and its basin size is 149 km^{2} (58 sq mi).
