= Șeulia =

Șeulia Sály
- Location within Romania

Location
- Country: Romania
- Counties: Mureș County
- Villages: Deag, Șeulia de Mureș

Physical characteristics
- Mouth: Mureș
  - location: Iernut
  - coordinates: 46.4555°N 24.2399°E
- Length: 17 km (11 mi)
- Basin size: 55 km^{2} (21 sq mi)

Basin features
- Progression: Mureș→ Tisza→ Danube→ Black Sea

The Șeulia (Hungarian: Sály, Sály-patak) is a left tributary of the river Mureș in Transylvania, Romania. It discharges into the Mureș in Iernut. Its length is 17 km (11 mi) and its basin size is 55 km^{2} (21 sq mi).
