= Sărata (Olt) =

- Location within Romania

Location
- Country: Romania
- Counties: Sibiu County

Physical characteristics
- Mouth: Olt
  - location: Porumbacu de Jos
  - coordinates: 45.7696°N 24.4634°E
- Length: 16 km (9.9 mi)
- Basin size: 31 km^{2} (12 sq mi)

Basin features
- Progression: Olt→ Danube→ Black Sea

The Sărata is a left tributary of the river Olt in Romania. It flows into the Olt in Porumbacu de Jos. Its length is 16 km (9.9 mi) and its basin size is 31 km^{2} (12 sq mi).
