= Valea Ierii =

- Commune
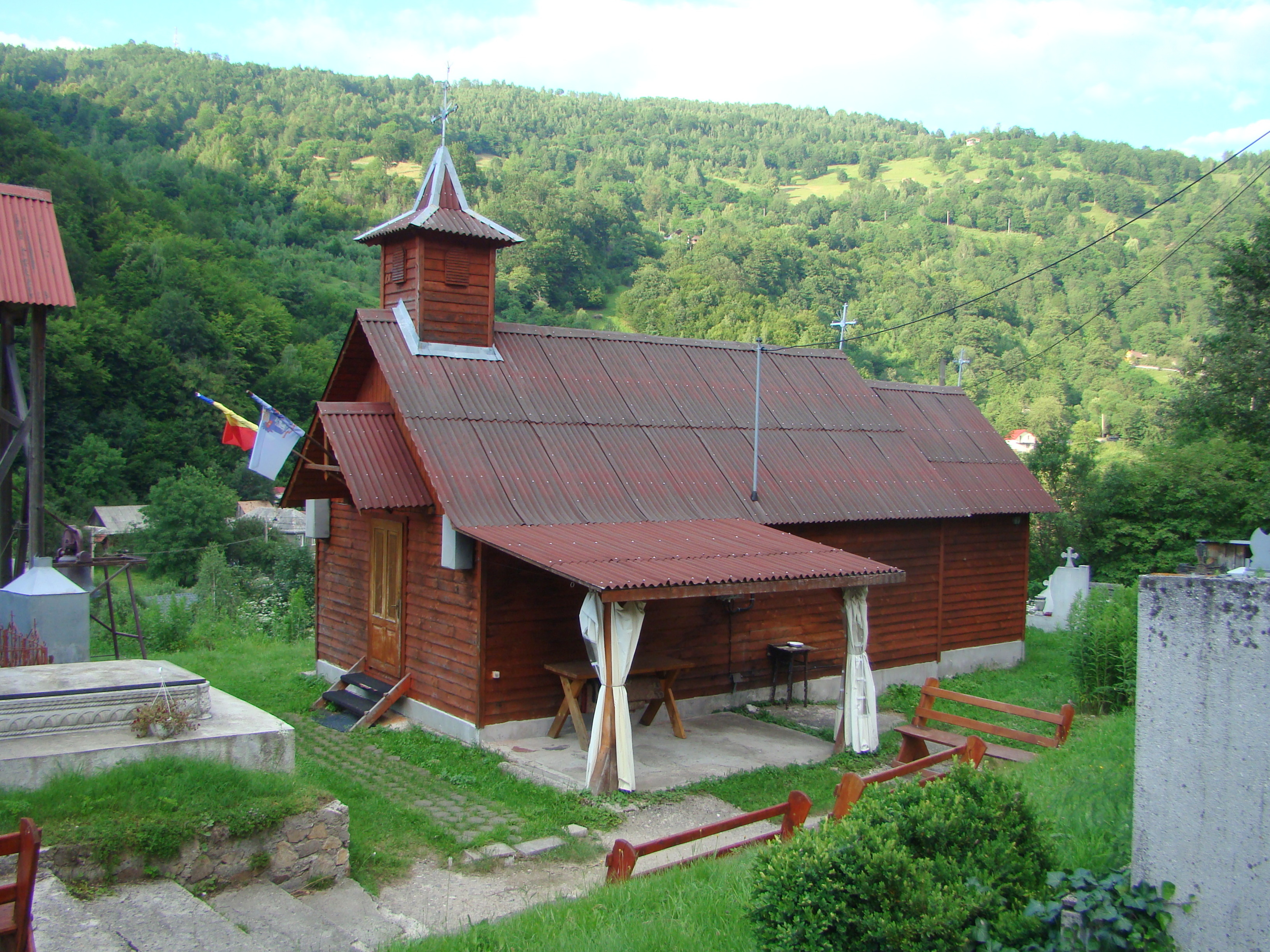
- Wooden church in Valea Ierii

- Location in Cluj County

- Location in Romania
- Coordinates: 46°38′52.08″N 23°20′49.2″E
- Country: Romania
- County: Cluj
- Subdivisions: Cerc, Plopi, Valea Ierii

Government
  - Mayor (2020–2024): Dorin Nap (PSD)
- Area: 148.67 km^{2} (57.40 sq mi)
- Elevation: 354 m (1,161 ft)
- Population (2021-12-01): 871
  - Density: 5.86/km^{2} (15.2/sq mi)
- Time zone: UTC+02:00 (EET)
  - Summer (DST): UTC+03:00 (EEST)
- Postal code: 407585
- Area code: +(40) x64
- Vehicle reg.: CJ
- Website: primariavaleaierii.ro

Valea Ierii (Hungarian: Járavize) is a commune in Cluj County, Transylvania, Romania. It is composed of three villages: Cerc (Kisfeneshavas), Plopi (Plop), and Valea Ierii.

== Demographics ==
According to the census from 2011 there were 888 people living in this commune; of this population, nearly all were ethnic Romanians. At the 2021 census, Valea Ierii had a population of 871; of those, 93.92% were Romanians and 1.03% Hungarians.
