= Sinoe oil field =

Oil field in the Black Sea

Sinoe
- Country: Romania
- Region: Black Sea
- Offshore/onshore: offshore
- Operator: Petrom

Field history
- Discovery: 1991
- Start of development: 1991
- Start of production: 1999

Production
- Current production of oil: 3,000 barrels per day (~1.5×10^{5} t/a)
- Current production of gas: 300×10^{3} m^{3}/d 10.7×10^{6} cu ft/d 0.1×10^{9} m^{3}/a (3.5×10^{9} cu ft/a)
- Estimated oil in place: 2.7 million tonnes (~ 3×10^{6} m^{3} or 20 million bbl)
- Estimated gas in place: 2×10^{9} m^{3} 71×10^{9} cu ft

The Sinoe oil field is an oil field located on the continental shelf of the Black Sea. It was discovered in 1991 and developed by Petrom. It began production in 1999 and produces oil. The total proven reserves of the Sinoe oil field are around 20 million barrels (3,200 thousand cubic metres), and production is centered on 3,000 barrels per day (480 m^{3}/d). The field also produces around 10.7 million ft^{3} (300 thousand m^{3}) per day of gas and has reserves of 71 billion ft^{3} (2.0 billion m^{3}).
