= Mihai Viteazu, Constanța =

Mihai Viteazu
- Commune
- Coat of arms

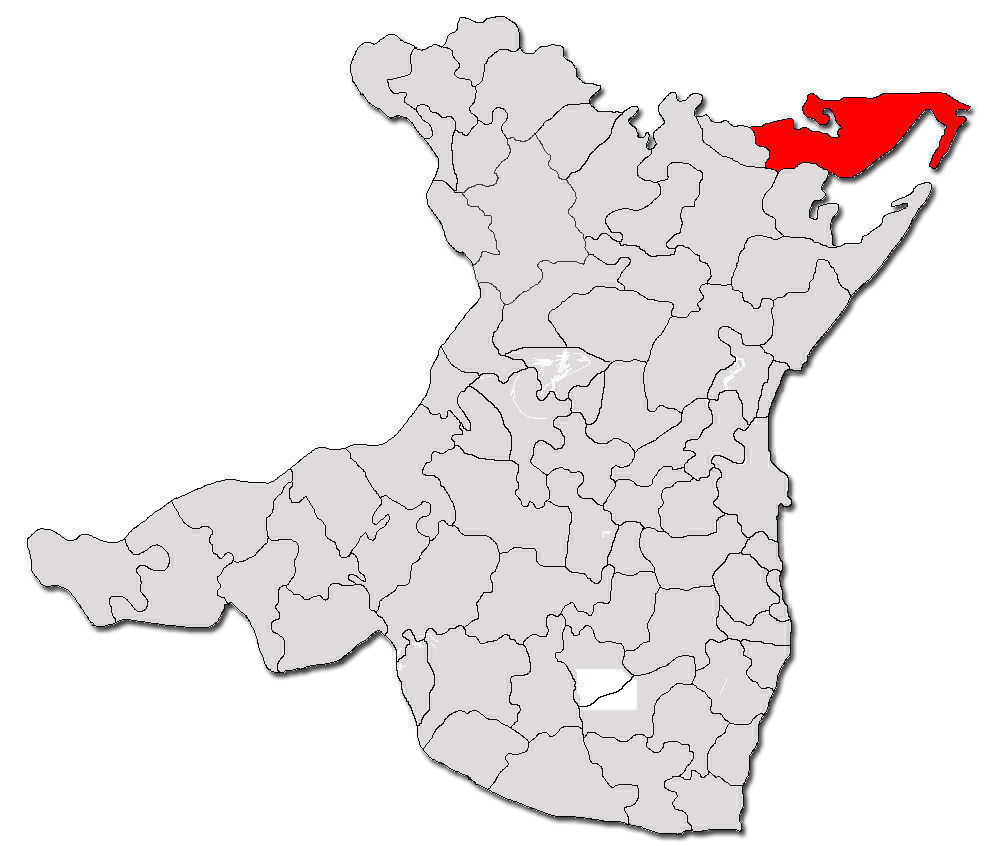
- Location in Constanța County

- Location in Romania
- Coordinates: 44°38′N 28°41′E
- Country: Romania
- County: Constanța
- Subdivisions: Mihai Viteazu, Sinoe

Government
  - Mayor (2020–2024): Gheorghe Grameni (PNL)
- Area: 206.22 km^{2} (79.62 sq mi)
- Elevation: 15 m (49 ft)
- Population (2021-12-01): 3,155
  - Density: 15.30/km^{2} (39.62/sq mi)
- Time zone: UTC+02:00 (EET)
  - Summer (DST): UTC+03:00 (EEST)
- Postal code: 907190
- Vehicle reg.: CT
- Website: www.primaria-mihaiviteazu.ro

Mihai Viteazu (Romanian pronunciation: [miˈhaj viˈte̯azu]) is a commune in Constanța County, Northern Dobruja, Romania. It is situated in the northeastern part of the county, some 60 km (37 mi) from the county seat, Constanța. To the east are the shores of the Black Sea and of Lake Sinoe, while to the north is Tulcea County.

The commune consists of two villages, which are 3 km (1.9 mi) apart:

- Mihai Viteazu, named after the Wallachian prince Michael the Brave (historical name: Sariurt).
- Sinoe (historical names: Casapchioi, Turkish: Kasapköy).

The Eolica Mihai Viteazu Wind Farm (with a nominal output of up to 80 MW of power) is located on the territory of the commune.

== Demographics ==
At the 2011 census, Mihai Viteazu had 3,244 inhabitants, of whom 2,881 were Romanians (94.83%), 3 Hungarians (0.10%), 148 Roma (4.87%), and 6 others (0.20%).

At the 1930 census, Mihai Viteazu had 1,720 inhabitants, of whom 1,576 (91.63%) were Bulgarians and 120 (6.98%) Romanians. In Sinoe, of 2,230 inhabitants, 2,136 (95.78%) were Bulgarians and 54 (2.42%) Romanians. The local Bulgarians left in 1940, during the population exchange between Bulgaria and Romania.

== Notable natives ==
- Ovidiu Papadima (1909–1996), Romanian literary critic, folklorist, and essayist
- Viorel Talapan (b. 1972), Romanian rower

== Gallery ==
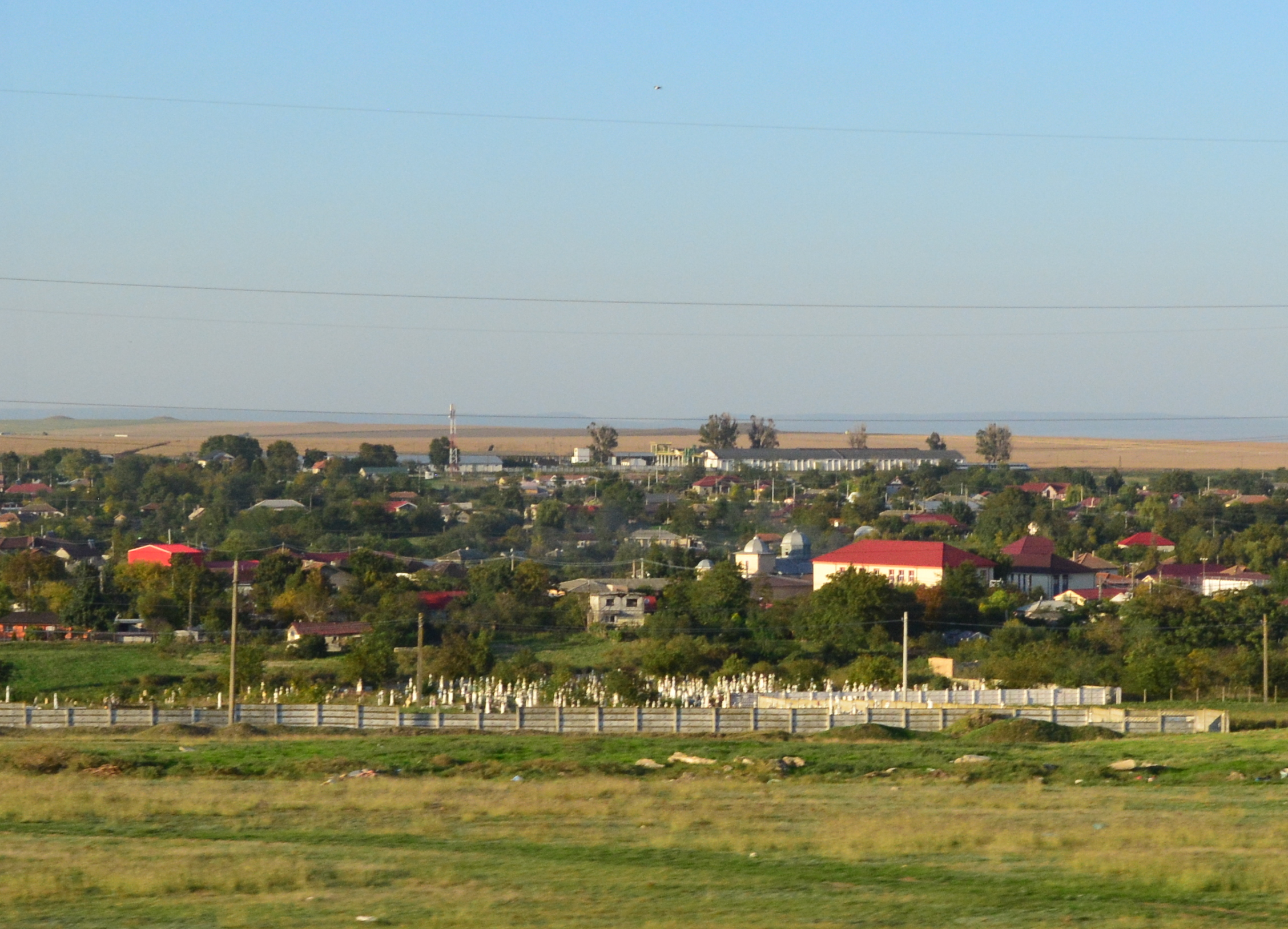
Village of Mihai Viteazu from the south.

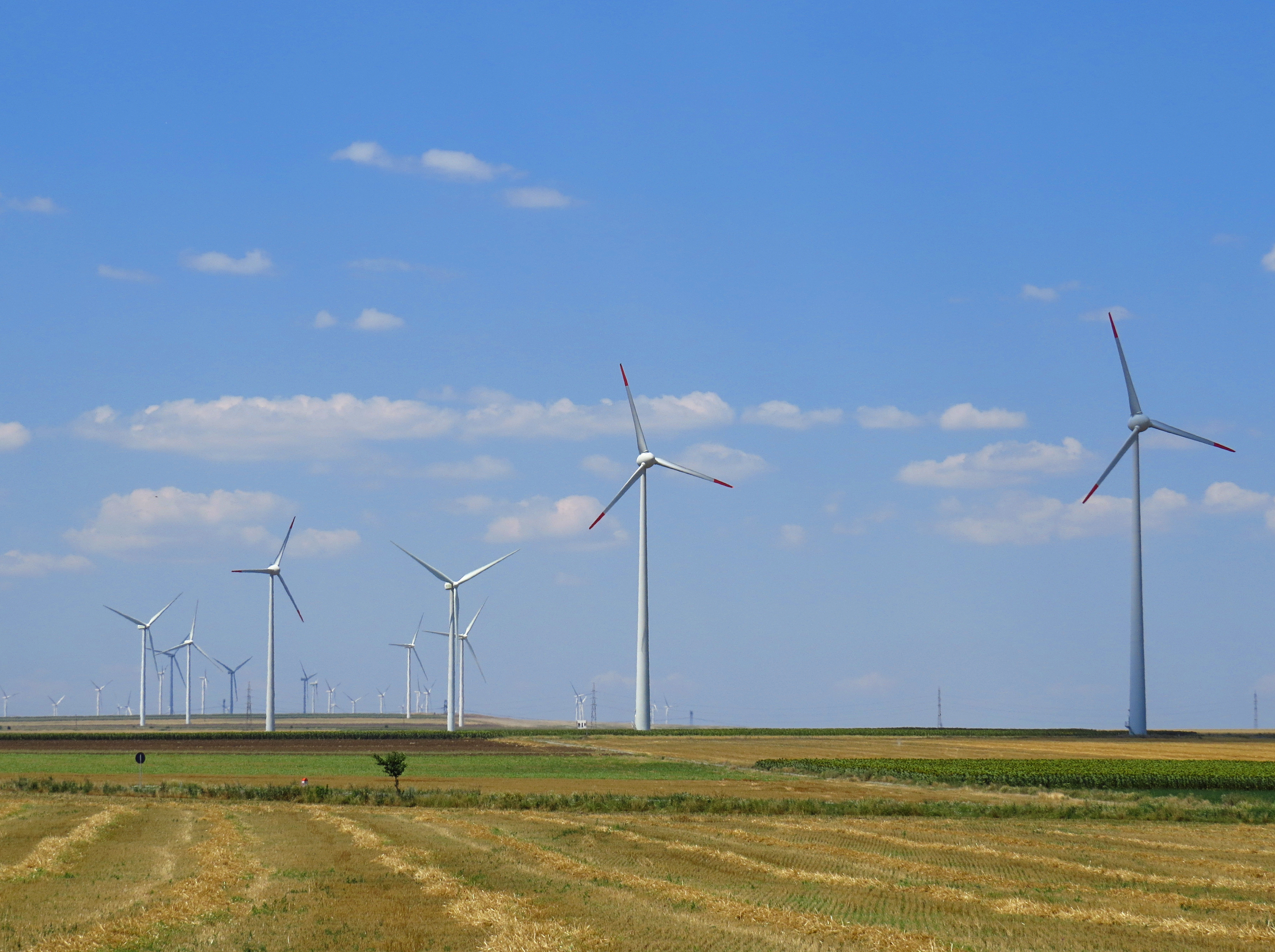
Windmills at the Eolica Mihai Viteazu Wind Farm

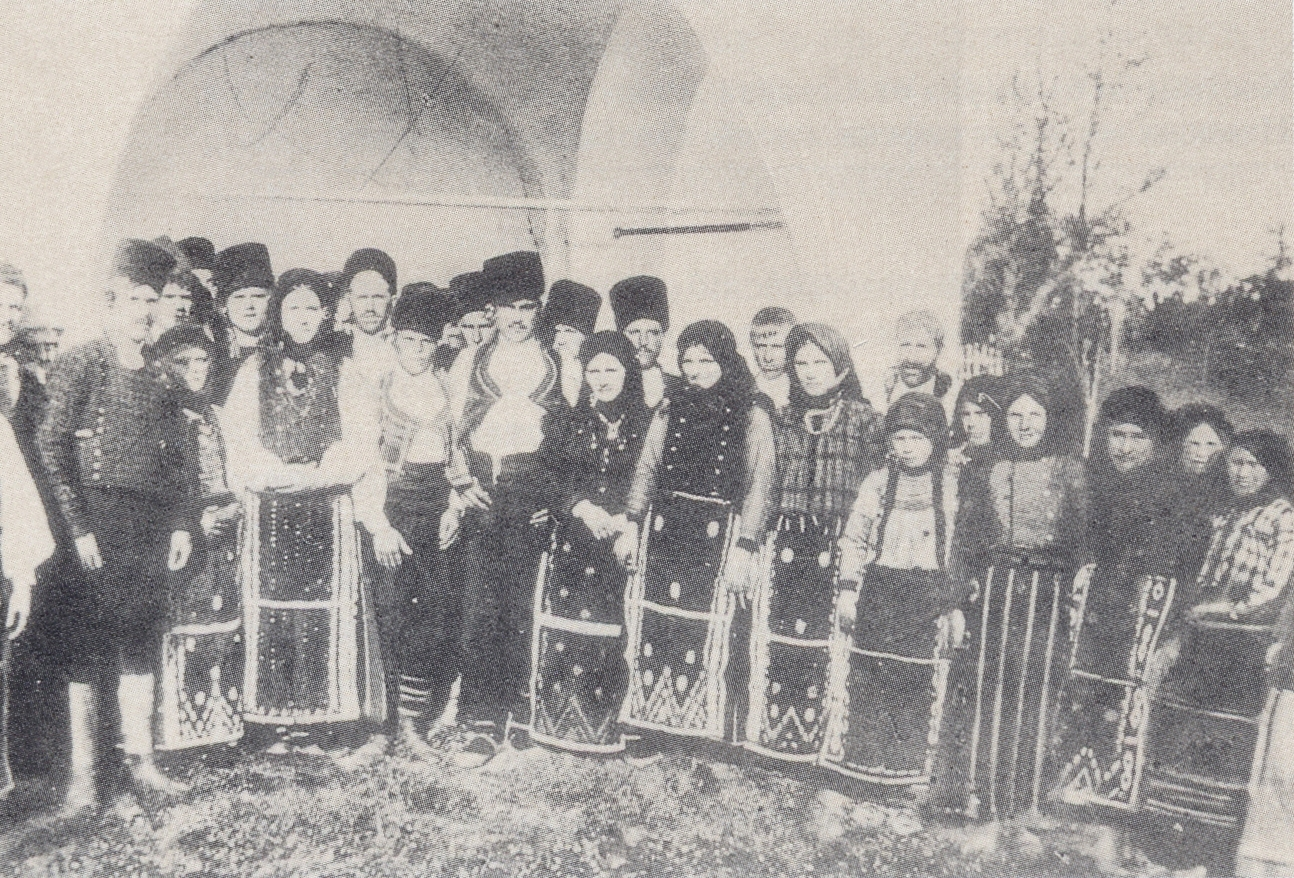
Bulgarians after church mass, Kasapköy village (today Sinoe), early 20th century
