= Șiștarovăț =

- Commune
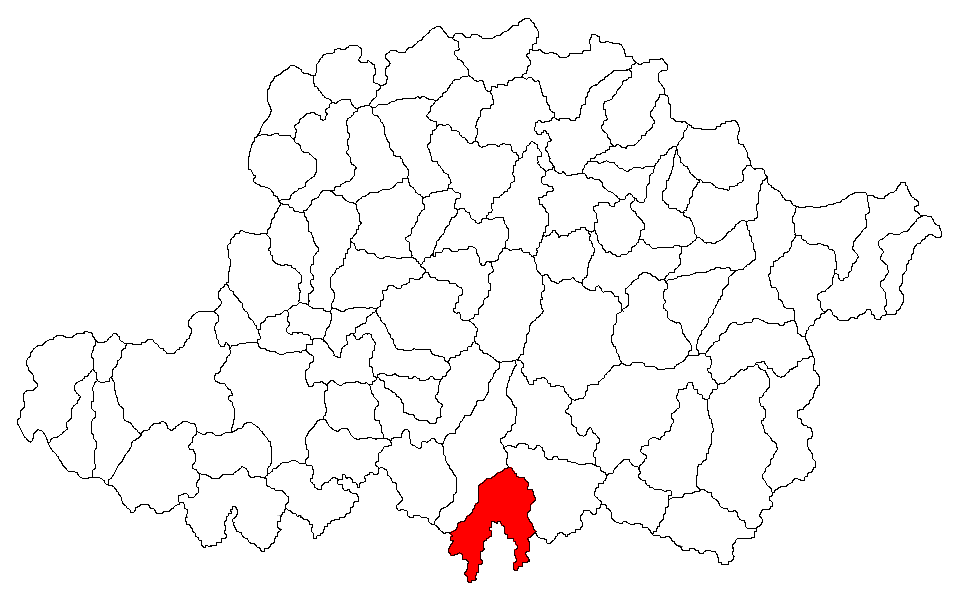
- Location in Arad County

- Location in Romania
- Coordinates: 46°01′N 21°44′E
- Country: Romania
- County: Arad

Government
  - Mayor (2024–2028): Alexandru Marius Damian (PSD)
- Area: 122.92 km^{2} (47.46 sq mi)
- Elevation: 195 m (640 ft)
- Population (2021-12-01): 340
  - Density: 2.8/km^{2} (7.2/sq mi)
- Time zone: UTC+02:00 (EET)
  - Summer (DST): UTC+03:00 (EEST)
- Postal code: 317345
- Area code: (+40) 02 57
- Vehicle reg.: AR
- Website: www.primariasistarovat.ro

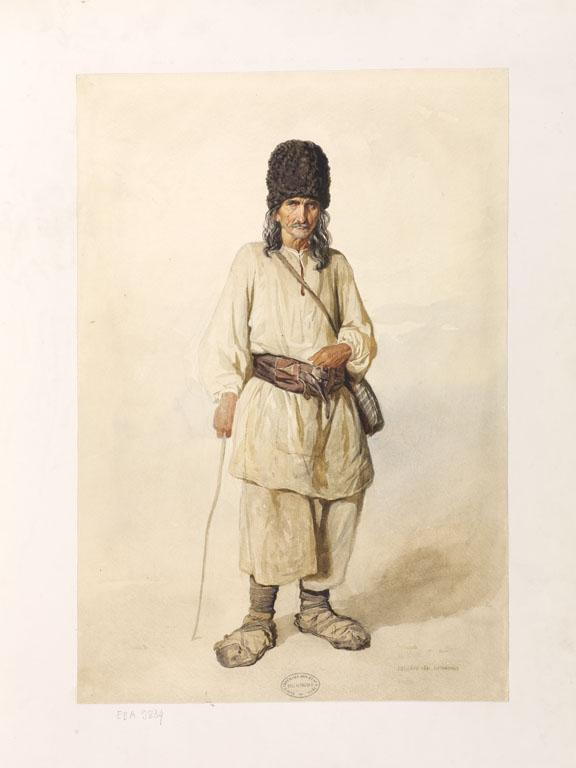
Théodore Valerio, Romanian shepherd from Șiștarovăț, 1869

Șiștarovăț (Hungarian: Sistaróc) is a commune in Arad County, Romania, is situated on the Lipova Hills and it occupies approximately 12,300 ha (30,000 acres). It is composed of four villages: Cuveșdia (Temeskövesd), Labașinț (Lábas), Șiștarovăț (situated at 42 km from Arad), and Varnița (Mészdorgos).

== Population ==
According to the 2002 census, the commune had 383 inhabitants; of those, 94.5% were Romanians, 2.9% Roma, 1.0% Hungarians, and 1.6% of other or undeclared nationalities. At the 2021 census, Șiștarovăț had a population of 340, of which 86.76% were Romanians.

== Natives ==
- Sever Bocu (1874–1951), politician, economist, and journalist
- Ioan Suciu (1862–1939), lawyer and politician

== History ==
The first documentary records of Șiștarovăț and Cuveșdia date back to 1440, Labașinț was first mentioned in 1477, while Varnița between 1820–1830.

== Economy ==
The economy of the commune is mainly agricultural; pomiculture, viticulture, livestock-breeding, and conversion of timber are well represented. The commune has a forest area of more than 6,000 ha (15,000 acres).

== Tourism ==
Although it is not abundant of spectacles, the landscapes of the Lipova Hills, as well as the traditions and the residents' hospitality are worth experiencing. There is also a cowboy and Indian style ranch which provides summer camps for kids and teens from the Arad county.
