= Pâncești, Bacău =

Pâncești
- Commune
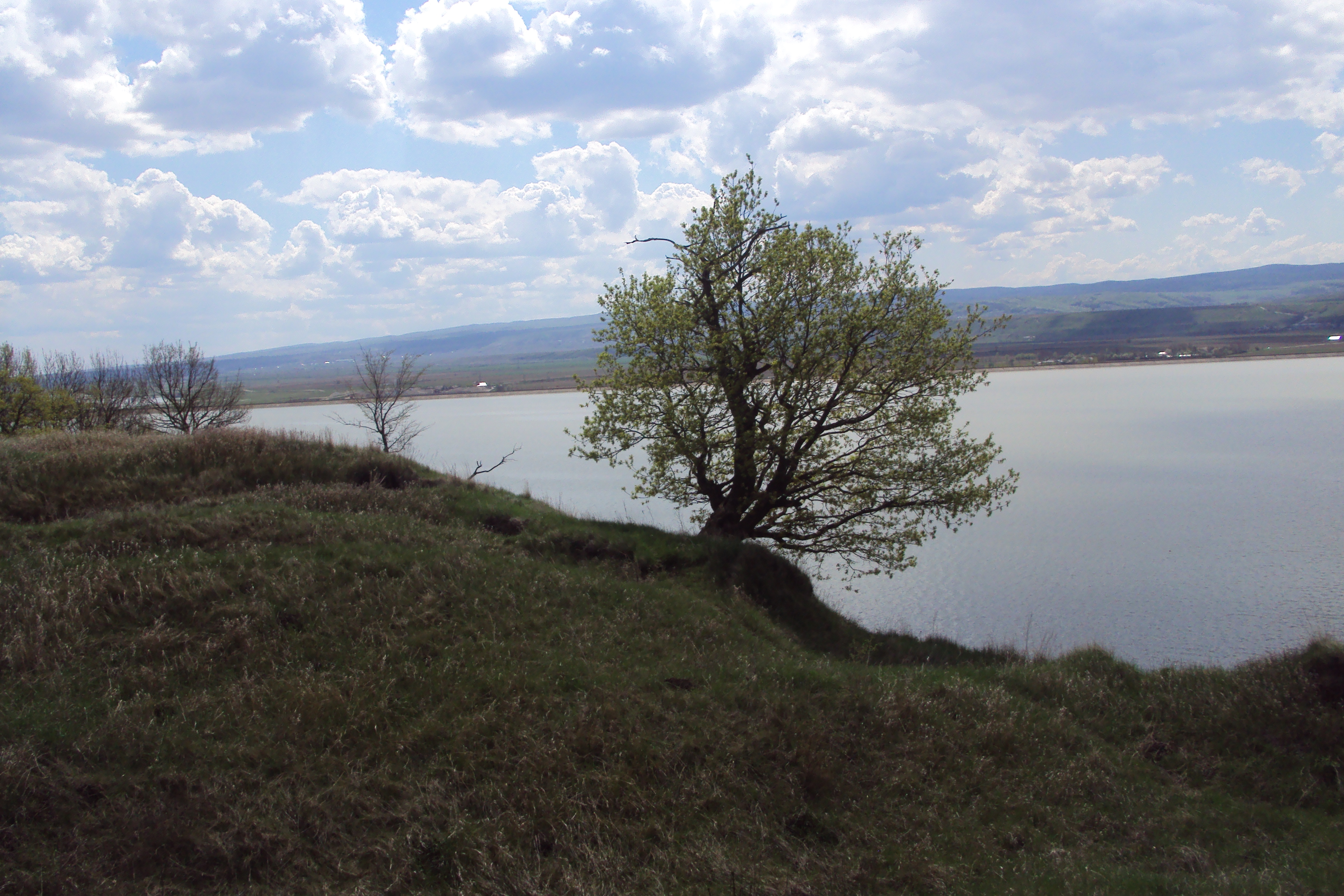

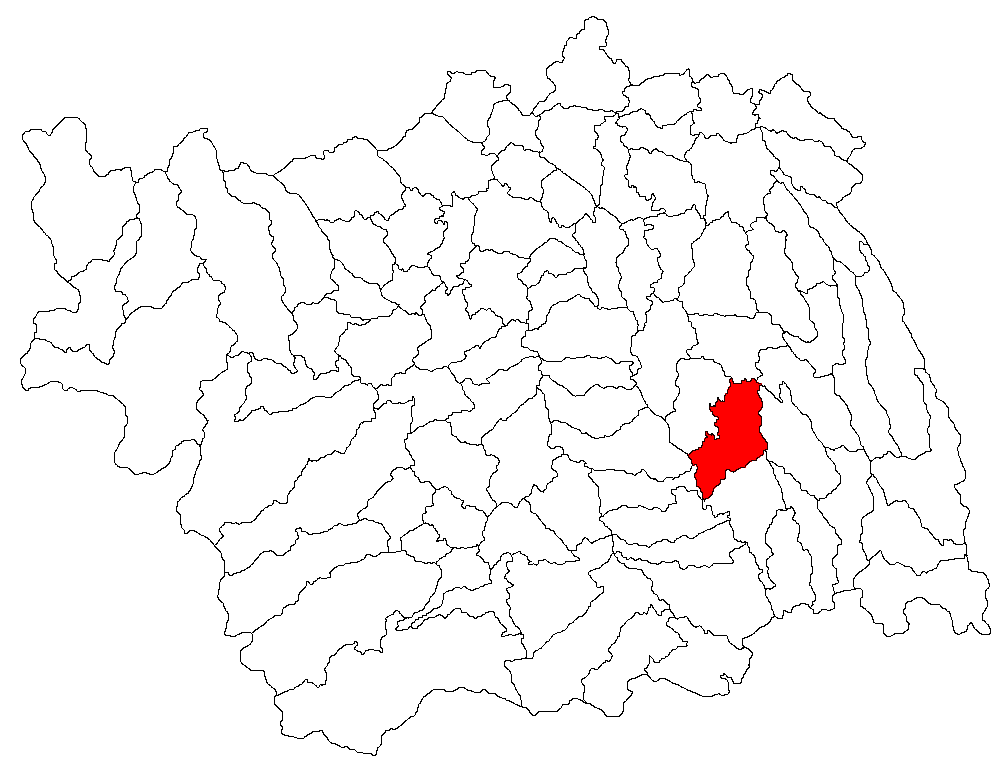
- Location in Bacău County

- Location in Romania
- Coordinates: 46°20′N 27°5′E
- Country: Romania
- County: Bacău

Government
  - Mayor (2024–2028): Vișinel Grădinaru (PSD)
- Area: 70.46 km^{2} (27.20 sq mi)
- Elevation: 208 m (682 ft)
- Population (2021-12-01): 3,652
  - Density: 51.83/km^{2} (134.2/sq mi)
- Time zone: UTC+02:00 (EET)
  - Summer (DST): UTC+03:00 (EEST)
- Postal code: 607523
- Area code: +(40) 0234
- Vehicle reg.: BC
- Website: comunapincesti.ro

Pâncești is a commune in Bacău County, Western Moldavia, Romania. It is composed of eight villages: Chilia Benei, Dieneț, Fulgeriș, Fundu Văii, Motoc, Pâncești, Petrești, and Soci.

== Natives ==
- Luigi Ionescu (1927 – 1994), folk music singer
