= Secaș =

- Commune
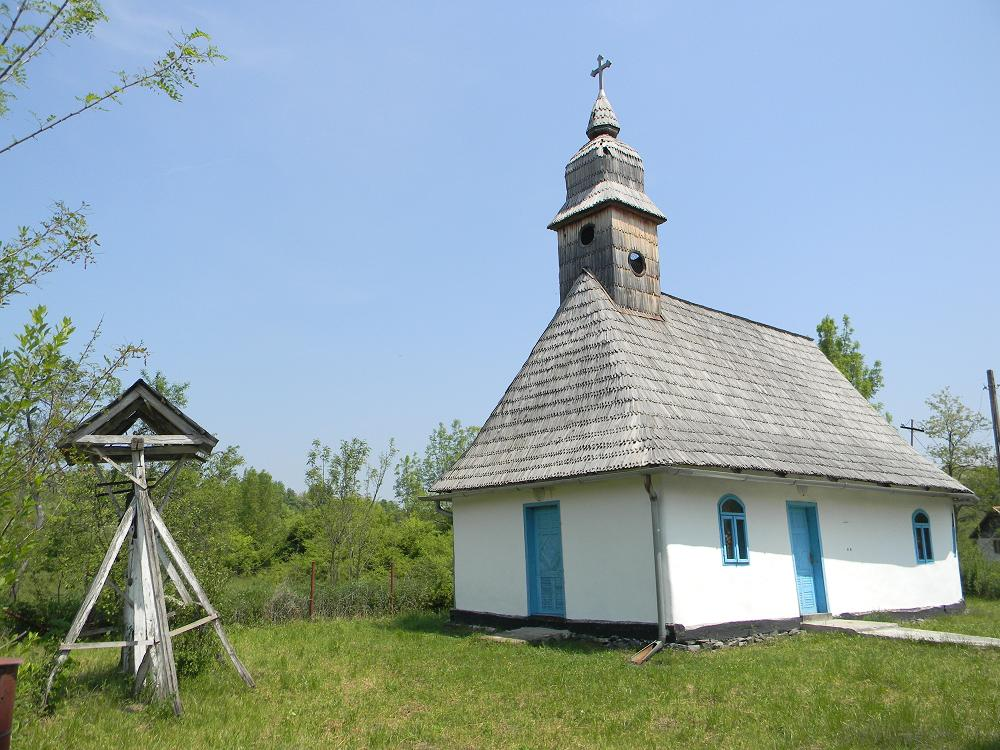
- The wooden church in Crivobara

- Location in Timiș County

- Location in Romania
- Coordinates: 45°53′N 21°49′E
- Country: Romania
- County: Timiș

Government
  - Mayor (2016–): Simion Pop (PNL)
- Area: 58.72 km^{2} (22.67 sq mi)
- Population (2021-12-01): 320
  - Density: 5.4/km^{2} (14/sq mi)
- Time zone: UTC+02:00 (EET)
  - Summer (DST): UTC+03:00 (EEST)
- Postal code: 307390–307393
- Vehicle reg.: TM
- Website: primariasecas.ro

Secaș (Hungarian: Temesszékás; German: Sekasch; Serbian: Секаш, romanized: Sekaš) is a commune in Timiș County, Romania. It is composed of four villages: Checheș, Crivobara, Secaș (commune seat) and Vizma.

== Geography ==
=== Climate ===
The climate is temperate continental with Mediterranean and oceanic influences, influenced by Banat's geographic position. The region is protected by the Carpathian Mountains, which block cold air masses from the north and northeast while allowing milder maritime air currents from the southwest and west to enter.

Precipitation levels vary significantly, with differences exceeding 80 mm even within the plain areas, and noticeably higher amounts in the eastern hills. The highest rainfall typically occurs in June, driven by intensified cyclonic activity originating from the North Atlantic or the Mediterranean basin.

In the plains, winds predominantly blow from the north.

=== Flora and fauna ===
Due to its relief and physical-geographical conditions, as well as its position at the intersection of Central European, sub-Mediterranean, Atlantic, Pontic continental, and circumpolar influences, the commune of Secaș features a rich and diverse vegetation.

The fauna of the steppe and forest-steppe regions has been significantly altered, primarily due to human activities, leading to a decline in both species diversity and population density. Among mammals, rodents are particularly notable, including species such as the ground squirrel (Spermophilus citellus), hamster (Cricetus cricetus), lesser blind mole-rat (Nannospalax leucodon), vole (Microtus arvalis), and hare (Lepus europaeus). As for birdlife, commonly observed species include the quail, partridge, woodcock, and red-necked nightjar, among others.

== History ==
Secaș first appears in written history in 1440. At that time it was assigned to Arad County, was called Kyszekas ("Little Secaș") and belonged to the Șoimoș Fortress. It continued to exist during the Ottoman period, as Marsigli's writings from 1690–1700 mention it as inhabited. After the conquest of Banat by the Austrians in 1717, the first census took place, in which two localities were recorded: Georg in Sekasch with seven houses and Dollnischas with 14 houses, both in the Lipova District. It is not mentioned on the map from 1761, but the very old Orthodox parish has registers since 1779. Later, only one village, Secaș, inhabited by Romanians, is recorded. The new Orthodox church was built in 1869.

In the interwar period it was part of Plasa Lipova, Timiș-Torontal County and exceeded 1,000 inhabitants. After World War II it began to become depopulated, mainly due to its relative isolation from industrial centers and major communications routes.

== Demographics ==
Ethnic composition (2021)
1. Romanians (87.2%)
2. Unknown (12.2%)
3. Others (0.64%)
Religious composition (2021)
1. Orthodox (74.4%)
2. Baptists (1.87%)
3. Pentecostals (1.87%)
4. Unknown (20.9%)
5. Others (0.96%)

Secaș had a population of 320 inhabitants at the 2021 census, up 7.02% from the 2011 census. Most inhabitants are Romanians (87.18%). For 12.18% of the population, ethnicity is unknown. By religion, most inhabitants are Orthodox (74.37%), but there are also minorities of Baptists (1.87%) and Pentecostals (1.87%). For 20.93% of the population, religious affiliation is unknown.

Census		Ethnic composition
Year	Population	Romanians	Hungarians	Germans	Ukrainians
1880	2,440	2,298	46	45	–
1890	2,626	2,532	15	45	–
1900	3,003	2,831	87	64	–
1910	3,017	2,839	79	55	–
1920	2,535	2,415	62	46	–
1930	2,810	2,441	13	42	294
1941	2,727	2,280	11	33	–
1956	2,291	2,259	3	14	–
1966	1,364	1,358	4	2	–
1977	472	469	2	1	–
1992	283	282	–	1	–
2002	306	303	–	1	1
2011	299	274	–	–	–
2021	320	279	–	–	–

== Politics and administration ==
The commune of Secaș is administered by a mayor and a local council composed of 9 councilors. The mayor, Simion Pop, from the National Liberal Party, has been in office since 2016. As from the 2024 local elections, the local council has the following composition by political parties:

Party	Seats	Composition
National Liberal Party	7	
Alliance for the Union of Romanians	1	
Social Democratic Party	1	
