= Băișoara =

- Commune
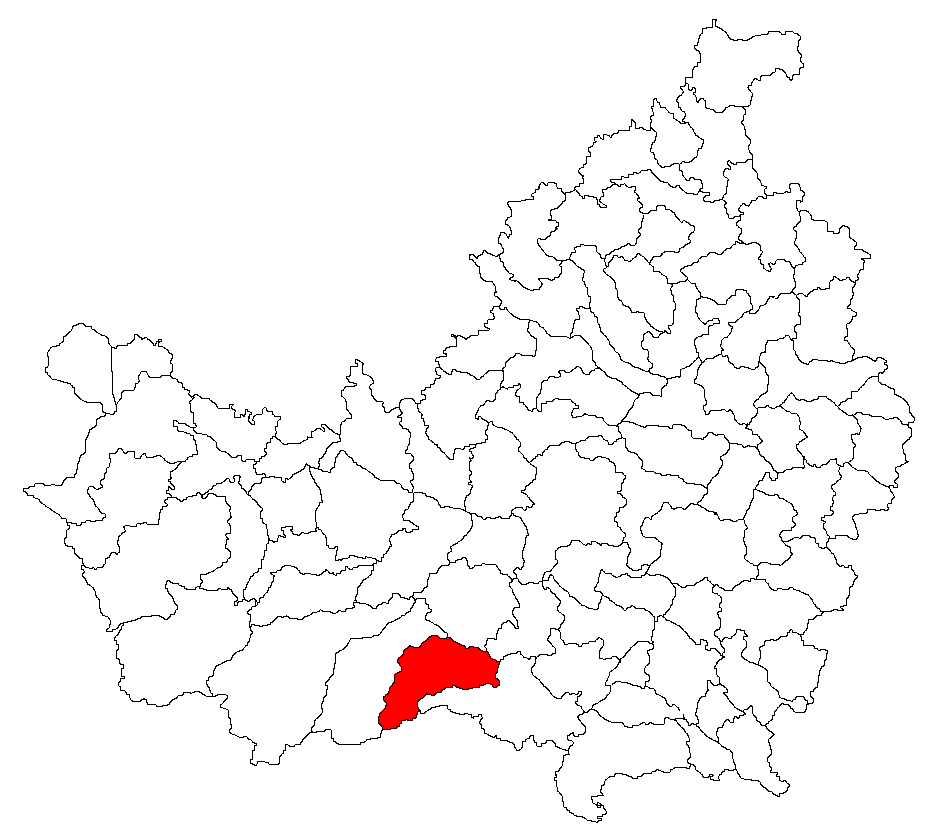
- Location in Cluj County

- Location in Romania
- Coordinates: 46°34′32″N 23°28′03″E
- Country: Romania
- County: Cluj
- Established: 1426
- Subdivisions: Băișoara, Frăsinet, Moara de Pădure, Muntele Băișorii, Muntele Bocului, Muntele Cacovei, Muntele Filii, Muntele Săcelului, Săcel

Government
  - Mayor (2020–2024): Liviu Ghib (PNL)
- Area: 111.04 km^{2} (42.87 sq mi)
- Elevation: 506 m (1,660 ft)
- Population (2021-12-01): 1,748
  - Density: 16/km^{2} (41/sq mi)
- Time zone: EET/EEST (UTC+2/+3)
- Postal code: 407065
- Area code: +40 x64
- Vehicle reg.: CJ
- Website: www.primariabaisoara.ro

Băișoara (Hungarian: Járabánya; German: Kleingrub, Ginsdorf) is a commune in Cluj County, Transylvania, Romania. It is composed of nine villages: Băișoara, Frăsinet, Moara de Pădure, Muntele Băișorii (Bányahavas), Muntele Bocului (Bikalathavas), Muntele Cacovei (Havastelep), Muntele Filii (Felsőfülehavas), Muntele Săcelului (Asszonyfalvahavas), and Săcel (Havasasszonyfalva).

Since 2000, following important improvements of the local infrastructure it was officially declared a winter sports resort.

== Demographics ==
According to the census from 2002 there were 2,330 people living in this town; of this population, 97.51% were ethnic Romanians, 1.67% ethnic Romani, and 0.72% ethnic Hungarians. At the 2021 census, the population of Băișoara had decreased to 1,748; of those, 85.01% were Romanians and 2.23% Roma.

== Natives ==
- Victor Felea (1923 – 1993), poet, essayist, and literary critic
