= Lake Sinoe =

Sinoe
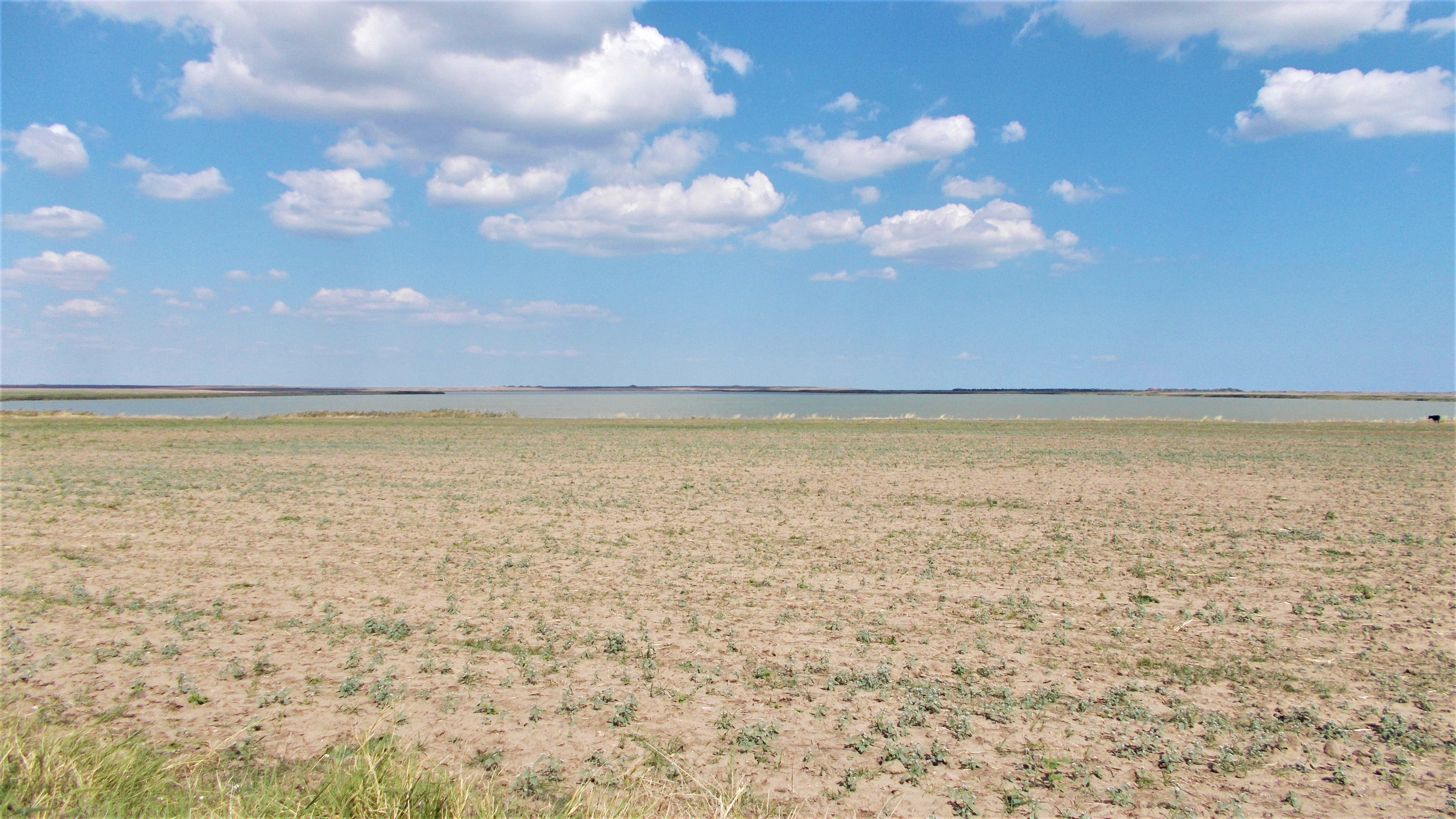
- Sinoe Lake, Constanța County, Romania

- Location within Romania
- Location: Northern Dobruja
- Coordinates: 44°35′00″N 28°50′00″E
- Type: lagoon, brackish
- Basin countries: Romania
- Surface area: 135.6 km^{2} (52.4 sq mi)
- Max. depth: 1.6 m (5 ft 3 in)
- Surface elevation: 0 m (0 ft)

Lake Sinoe is a lagoon in Northern Dobruja, Romania, close to the Black Sea. Its name derives from Slavic (Blue Lake). The ruins of the ancient Greek colony of Histria are located on the lake shore.

== See also ==
- Sinoe oil field located on the continental shelf of the Black Sea, discovered in 1991 and developed by Petrom.
- Sinoê an Arcadian nymph associated with the Roman deity Pan
