= Sărata =

Sărata may refer to:

== Populated places ==
- Sărata, Bacău, a commune in Romania
- Sărata, a village in Solonț Commune, Bacău County, Romania
- Sărata, a village in Bistrița city, Bistrița-Năsăud County, Romania
- Sărata, a village in Mihălășeni Commune, Botoșani County, Romania
- Sărata, a village in Românești Commune, Botoșani County, Romania
- Sărata, a village in Ulmeni Commune, Buzău County, Romania
- Sărata, a village in Panticeu Commune, Cluj County, Romania
- Sărata, a village in Călărași Commune, Dolj County, Romania
- Sărata, a village in Dobreni Commune, Neamț County, Romania
- Sărata, a village in Porumbacu de Jos Commune, Sibiu County, Romania
- Sărata Veche, a commune in Fălești district, Moldova
- Sărata-Galbenă, a commune in Hîncești district, Moldova
- Sărata Nouă, a commune in Leova district, Moldova
- Sărata-Răzeși, a commune in Leova district, Moldova
- Sărata-Mereșeni, a village in Mereșeni, Hîncești district, Moldova
- Sărata-Monteoru, a village in Merei, Buzău, Romania
- Sărata, the Romanian name of Sarata, a village in Ukraine

== Rivers ==
- Sărata, the Romanian name for the Sarata, a river in Ukraine and Moldova
- Sărata (Bașeu), a tributary of the Bașeu (Prut basin) in Botoșani County, Romania
- Sărata (Gârla Boul Bătrân), a tributary of the Gârla Boul Bătrân (Prut basin) in Vaslui County, Romania
- Sărata (Ialomița), a tributary of the Ialomița in Ialomița County, Romania
- Sărata, a tributary of the Meleș (Someș basin) in Bistrița-Năsăud County, Romania
- Sărata (Mureș), a tributary of the Mureș in Mureș County, Romania
- Sărata (Olt), a tributary of the Olt in Sibiu County, Romania
- Sărata (Prut), a tributary of the Prut in Leova District, Moldova
- Sărata, a tributary of the Rona (Iza basin) in Maramureș County, Romania
- Sărata, a tributary of the Târnava Mică in Mureș County, Romania

== See also ==
- Sarata (disambiguation)
- Sărățel (disambiguation)
- Sărăteni (disambiguation)
- Sărulești (disambiguation)
