= Lăpușna (Prut) =

Location
- Country: Moldova

Physical characteristics
- Mouth
  - location: Prut at Sărata-Răzeși
  - coordinates: 46.5894°N 28.2397°E
- Length: 70 km (43 mi)

Basin features
- Progression: Prut→ Danube→ Black Sea

The Lăpușna is a 70 km (43 mi) long left tributary of the river Prut in southern Moldova. It flows through the villages Iurceni, Pașcani, Lăpușna, Cărpineni and Mingir, and it discharges into the Prut near the village Sărata-Răzeși.
