= Sărăteni =

Sărăteni or Sărăţeni may refer to the following places:

== Romania ==
- Sărățeni, Mureș, a commune in Mureș County, Romania
  - Castra of Sărățeni, a Roman fort in Mureș
- Sărățeni, Ialomița
- Sărăţeni, a village administered by Murgeni town, Vaslui County

== Moldova ==
- Sărăteni, Leova, a commune in Leova district
- Sărăteni, a village in Cotul Morii Commune, Hînceşti district
- Sărătenii Noi, a village in Ratuș Commune, Teleneşti district
- Sărătenii Vechi, a commune in Teleneşti district

== See also ==
- Sarata (disambiguation)
- Sărata (disambiguation)
- Sărățel (disambiguation)
- Sărulești (disambiguation)
