= Pașcani (disambiguation) =

Pașcani is a city in Iași County, Romania.

Pașcani may also refer to:

- Pașcani, Criuleni, a commune in Criuleni district, Moldova
- Pașcani, Hîncești, a commune in Hîncești district, Moldova
- Pașcani, a village in Manta Commune, Cahul district, Moldova
