= Coat of arms of Cimișlia =

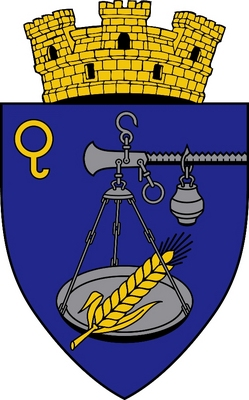
- Armiger: Civic
- Adopted: 16 June 2009; 15 years ago
- Crest: Mural crown with three towers
- Shield: An azure field with a Roman silver balance holding a golden ear of grain; golden local Tatar danga in the canton

The coat of arms of Cimișlia (Romanian: Stemă Cimișliei) is the official coat of arms of the city of Cimișlia, in the Cimișlia District, Moldova. It consists of a silver balance coming out of the coat of arms on the left and that holds an ear of grain representing the wealth of the city's cereals. On the canton (corner) of the coat of arms is the danga of a Tatar tribe, a unique symbol of Cimișlia. The field is blue, representing the sky and other values and elements. Above the coat of arms is a mural crown with three towers. It was proposed to use the coat of arms on the flag of Cimișlia, which was approved for a few months before the flag was changed again to its current form.

The process for the adoption of a coat of arms for Cimișlia was long. It began in March 2007 after a request from the mayor. A contest was organized in the city, but the proposals sent were ultimately rejected. The Cimișlia City Council asked the National Heraldry Commission (CNH) and a local painter for assistance. They designed Cimișlia's current coat of arms, and upon its submission, it was adopted on 16 June 2009.

== Description ==
On a blue field, a Roman silver balance protrudes from the left side of the coat of arms. On its weighing pan is found a golden ear of grain. This reflects the importance Cimișlia had in the past due to its cereal trade. Bread was brought from all neighboring localities and trade exceeded 500,000 rubles. Nowadays, agriculture is still important for the city. In the canton (corner) of the coat of arms is the danga (a tool for livestock) of the ciumeci, the Romanian name of a Tatar tribe from which the name Cimișlia originates. This danga is golden in color and consists of a ring with a line, straight at first and inverted at the end. It is considered the most unique and individualizing element of the city, and its importance is marked by the use of the color gold and its placement in the canton of the shield, a position of "maximum honor". The coat of arms is "stamped" by a golden mural crown of three towers. This shows Cimișlia's status as a city and capital of the Cimișlia District. The blue color of the shield represents the sky, infinity, dreams and a peaceful and free life. The flag of Cimișlia was based on the coat of arms, preserving all the meanings of the latter.

== History ==
The flag of Cimișlia, which was based on the coat of arms and which used it in earlier versions

In March 2007, the mayor of Cimișlia, Ion Alexandreanu, requested the collaboration of the National Heraldry Commission (CNH) to create a flag and coat of arms for the city. The preparatory documentation for this lasted a year, and in early 2008, a competition was announced. Participants would send their submissions for a flag and coat of arms, being 12 March 2008 the deadline. Contest winners would win two cash prizes of 1000 lei (almost $100 then) each. On 10 March, the Cimișlia City Council issued a decision setting up a commission to elaborate the city's symbols and approving its working regulations. This commission consisted of ten people. The president was the mayor Gheorghe Răileanu (who had replaced Alexandreanu), while the secretary was Radion Nechit, a specialist in juvenile and sportive problems. Another notable member was the vice mayor Sergiu Pleșca, whose actions were decisive during the process in later years.

The winner of the contest was the geography teacher Eremei Lavric. He received the award of 1000 lei and became the leader of the process for the adoption of a coat of arms and flag. For the former, he had a proposal:

- On the first half of the coat of arms, there would be a blue church raised by a six-armed cross to represent Christianity. In front of it, there would be a golden sun rising from the line that separates both halves of the coat of arms and illuminating the first of them. On this separatory line, there would also be a wavy blue band evoking the Cogâlnic river, which passes through the city. The church and the sun were to be surrounded by a green ribbon, symbolizing the "labyrinths of the city". A stork is also found in this half.
- Regarding the second half, there would be a bunch of grapes held by the stork in the upper half. This represents the symbol of Moldovan winemaking. Starting from the bunch of grapes, there is a gully with three "terraces" and deep thresholds to reference the relief of Cimișlia. According to Lavric, it represents the 100 hectares (250 acres) of real estate of the locality, of which 12 ha (30 acres) have great paleontological value. The lilac color of the field represents "the hospitality of the people of Cimișlia, a characteristic of the steppes of Budjak", as well as "the traditional cosmic color of the Moldovans, the awakening color of each one of us: joy, good humor, greatness, prosperity".
- Finally, a mural crown with three towers representing Trajan's Wall is found above both halves. Lavric also proposed to write the name of the city in Latin characters in a way similar to the formerly used Cyrillic alphabet. It was also thought to include two ears of wheat surrounding the sun to represent agriculture, as well as an improvised "ladle" in the frame of the coat of arms representing the danga of the ciumeci, but they were dropped from the final result.

In addition, the flag he designed included this coat of arms in the middle. Nevertheless, Lavric's proposals presented several artistic, heraldic and semantic problems, and some of the elements he used were not considered sufficiently "individualizing" by the local authorities. Therefore, at the end of 2008, the Cimișlia City Council requested the assistance of the CNH and the painter Victor Hristov, a native of Cimișlia, to make new designs for a flag and coat of arms. Hristov had already made a coat of arms for the competition. It had a French style, cut in two blue and red halves by a golden line, alluding the Moldovan flag. A silver horse holds with the right front hoof a golden ear and with the left front one a Spanish-like coat of arms with a common grape vine (whose leaves and stem are green and its racemes are blue) on a golden field. The coat of arms is "stamped" with a silver mural crown with a tower with a golden Christian cross above.

Hristov, together with the heraldist and vexillologist Silviu Andrieș-Tabac (a member of the CNH), prepared both a flag and a coat of arms in December 2008 and artistically and technically defined them at the end of March 2009. After this, they were presented to the local authorities. The mayor of Cimișlia, with doubts about their quality, requested on 2 June 2009 an examination by the CNH of the two symbols to discuss them later in a city council meeting. The local authorities decided to separate the question of the coat of arms and the flag and on 16 June, they approved the current coat of arms for the city. Subsequently, the CNH approved the coat of arms two days later. The process for the adoption of a flag would take longer. On 4 February 2010, the Cimișlia City Council approved a flag with the coat of arms in the canton, but following disagreements with the CNH, the flag was changed and the current version with nothing in the canton was adopted on 30 June 2010.

The adoption of the coat of arms and the flag was ultimately confirmed on 25 March 2015 after the decision nr. 324-IV.01 of the CNH.

== See also ==
- Flag of Cimișlia
