= Ion Prodan =

Ion Prodan may refer to:

- Ion Prodan (footballer)
- Ion Prodan (serial killer)
