= Fyodor Prodan =

Russian serial killer

- Born: Fyodor Fyodorovich Prodan; 14 October 1976 (age 49); Sărata Veche, Fălești District, Moldovan SSR
- Conviction: Murder x4
- Penalty: 11 years (1997); Life imprisonment (2020)

Details
- Victims: 4
- Span of crimes: 1997–2017
- Country: Russia
- States: Mordovia, Tula, Oryol
- Date apprehended: 2017
- Imprisoned at: Torbeevsky Central, Torbeyevo, Republic of Mordovia

Fyodor Fyodorovich Prodan (Russian: Фёдор Фёдорович Продан; born 14 October 1976) is a Moldovan-born Russian serial killer who murdered four people from 1997 to 2017 in three regions. For his last crimes, he was convicted and sentenced to life imprisonment.

== Early life and crimes ==
Fyodor Prodan was born on 14 October 1976, in the village of Sărata Veche, in the Moldovan SSR. Little is known about his early life, aside from the fact a majority of his relatives were engaged in criminal activities - including his uncle Ion, who would gain infamy for a series of murders committed in the 1990s. This greatly influenced the young man, and in 1993, Fyodor was prosecuted for theft.

A few years later, in 1997, Prodan stabbed his cohabitant to death after she decided to leave him for another man. He was given an 11-year sentence, which he served until his release in 2007, but would be repeatedly imprisoned for thefts committed in Moscow. Prodan's former cellmate later said that while he was incarcerated, the man actively corresponded with many women, including one named Natalia Vinogradova, to whom he lied that he had been imprisoned for participating in a fatal car accident.

In April 2014, Prodan was released from prison and moved back to Mordovia to live with a woman named Natalia Vinogradova and her daughter, Anastasia, who suffered from a neurological disease. Not long after, they bought a dacha in the villages of Maklets in Tula Oblast. While local villagers described Prodan as a thrifty man, he was also known for being violent towards Vinogradova, whom he would often violently berate and beat, in addition to strictly controlling the family budget and prohibiting the purchase of anything above 5,000 rubles. Reportedly, most of the quarrels concerned his disabled stepdaughter.

=== Murders ===
On 24 November 2015, Prodan told the 52-year-old Vinogradova that they were going to move to Oryol Oblast, where some of his relatives lived. He then proceeded to strangle her with a clothesline, wrapped up the corpse in a rug and dumped it outside. He then lied to 32-year-old Anastasia that he had already taken her mother to Oryol Oblast, and was now going to drive her there. From there, he drove to the village of Vasyutino in the Pokrovsky District, where he strangled Anastasia with a cord and hid her corpse in a ravine, which he covered with leaves and dirt.

Sometime after the murders, Prodan returned to the crime scene and hid Natalia's corpse in a ravine near the Lyubovka River, before selling the dacha and moving in with a new girlfriend named Tamara in Moscow. Anastasia's remains were found in April 2016, while Natalia's were found in November 2018.

Sometime in 2017, Prodan got into a quarrel with Tamara after announcing that they were going to move someplace else. In his anger, he strangled her with a rope. He then quickly sold her apartment and fled.

=== Arrest, trial and imprisonment ===
Despite his attempts to flee, vital information about Prodan's car was relayed to the police by Tamara's friends. As a result, he was caught by the traffic police, and when they opened the trunk of his car, they found the woman's body inside it.

Initially, Prodan was charged solely with Tamara's murder, but he was soon tied to the murders of Natalia and Anastasia Vinogradova and eventually confessed to killing both. During an investigative experiment, he showed the officers how he had killed them and where he had hidden the bodies, showing no apparent remorse for his actions.

After a psychiatric evaluation determined that he was able to stand trial, Prodan was tried for the murders of the three women. In 2020, a regional court in Oryol found him guilty on all charges and gave him a life sentence.

== Current status ==
As of December 2024, Prodan is incarcerated at the Torbeevsky Central in Mordovia. In August of that year, he wrote a petition to join the Storm-Z unit and participate in the invasion of Ukraine. Due to the severity of his crimes, this petition was denied and he remains behind bars.

== See also ==
- Ion Prodan - uncle and fellow serial killer
- List of Russian serial killers

== In the media and culture ==
- "Killer Gene" (Russian: Ген убийцы), 2021 - episode from the documentary series On the trail of a Monster (Russian: По следу монстра)
