= Batîr =

- Village
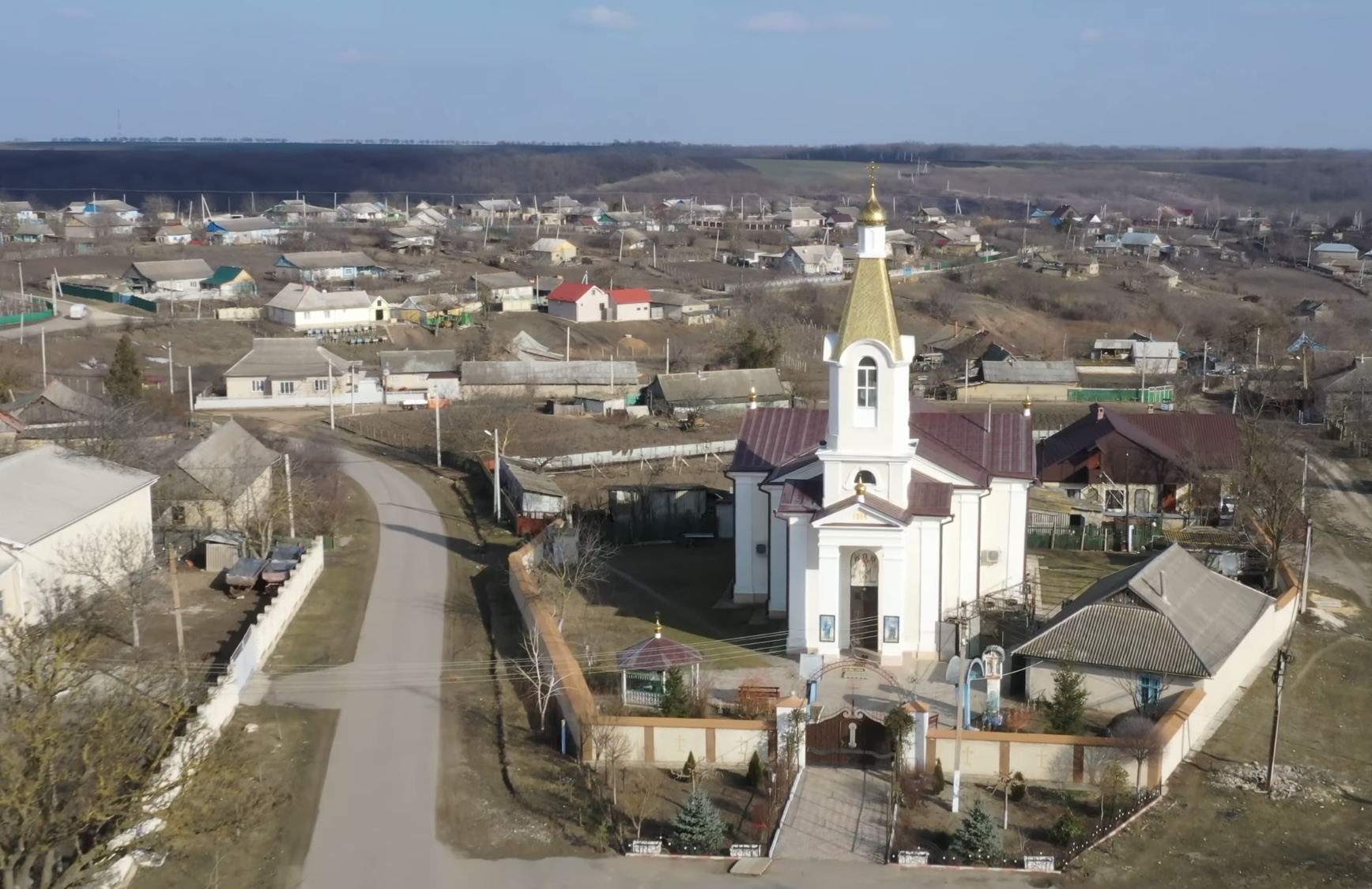

- Location within Moldova
- Coordinates: 46.578°N 29.005°E
- Country: Moldova
- District: Cimișlia

Government
  - Mayor: Anatolie Spînu (PCRM)

Area
  - Total: 45.49 km^{2} (17.56 sq mi)

Population (2014 census)
  - Total: 1,912
- Time zone: UTC+2 (EET)
  - Summer (DST): UTC+3 (EEST)

Batîr is a village in Cimișlia District, near the southern border of Moldova.

== History ==
The actual village was founded in 1808 when 48 moldovan peasant families settled in the area, which was previously home to a tatar settlement. In 1822 the village was settled by ten more families of ruthenian peasants, who had the surnames Revenko, Malashenko, Girik, Grizhuk, Todorovič, Grushitskiy (also Grushinskiy), Podkormezhnyy (also Kernitskiy and Zakerničnyy) and Vesel’noy (also Vesel’nyy and Vesyolyy).

== Geography ==
The village is located in southern Moldova, at a distance of about 14 km from the district administrative center Cimișlia.
