= Sărulești =

Sărulești may refer to several places in Romania:

- Sărulești, Buzău, a commune in Buzău County
- Sărulești, Călărași, a commune in Călărași County
- Sărulești, a village in Lăpușata Commune, Vâlcea County

== See also ==
- Sarata (disambiguation)
- Sărățel (disambiguation)
- Sărăteni (disambiguation)
