= Sasyk Lagoon =

Ukrainian lagoon

Coordinates: 45°38′37″N 29°39′27″E

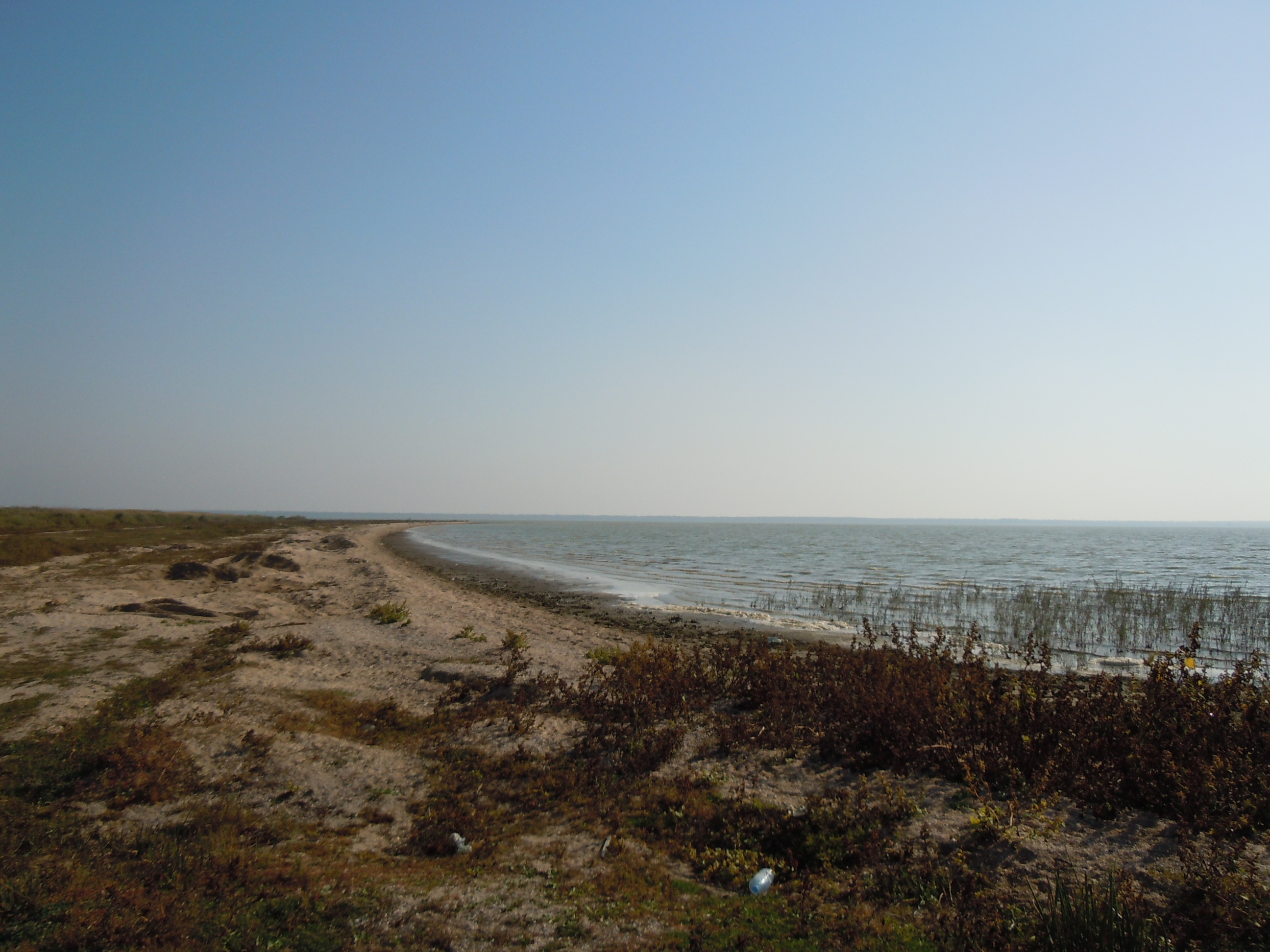
- The coast of Sasyk Lagoon (near Hlyboka)
- Interactive map of Sasyk Lagoon
- Location: Black Sea
- River sources: Cogâlnic River, Sarata River
- Basin countries: Ukraine
- Surface area: 241.88 km^{2} (93.39 sq mi)
- Average depth: 1.05 m (3.4 ft)
- Max. depth: 3.3 m (11 ft)
- Settlements: Tatarbunary

Ramsar Wetland
- Official name: Sasyk Lake
- Designated: 23 November 1995
- Reference no.: 762

Sasyk, or Kunduk (Ukrainian: Сасик, Кундук, Romanian: Limanul Sasic, Conduc, Turkish: Sasık Gölü, Kunduk Gölü), is a lagoon or liman in southern Ukraine, near the Danube Delta. It is a Ramsar listed wetland site important for migrating, breeding and moulting birds. About 25,000 pairs of wetland birds make their nests there (an increase of 15,000 since 2000) and seasonal conglomerations of birds are up to 100,000 individuals.

The area of the lagoon is 241.88 square kilometres (93.39 sq mi), and has a depth up to 3.3 metres (11 ft). Until 1978 the lagoon was separated into two parts: northern brackishwater area, including the rivers Cogâlnic and Sarata, and a southern marine area. The lagoon was separated from the sea by a 0.5 kilometres (0.31 mi) wide sandbar.

== Dam and reduced salinity ==
In 1978, a concrete dam was built on the sandbar and the lagoon was connected to the Danube River by a canal, through which fresh flood waters come. This has adversely changed the salinity in the lake, and this plus disturbances from recreation and commercial fishing activities have influenced the habitat for wildfowl.

The aim of this Soviet dam project was to convert the lagoon to a fresh water lake to use for irrigation. However, this failed and the use of water from Sasyk resulted in the salinization of about 30,000 hectares (300 km^{2}) of land, with associated detrimental impact on crops, and mineralization of ground water and wells. The project ended in ecological, social and economic disaster.

A 2007 report stated that the lagoon had become too dangerous for swimming because of pollution, including pesticides and heavy metals. The water is described as greenish with an unpleasant smell. Many now favour breaking the dam and reconnecting the lagoon with the sea.

In 2022, Ukrainian-American filmmaker Andrea Odezynska's documentary film Return Sasyk To The Sea was released, detailing the history of the region and efforts to restore the damaged wetlands.

== Biodiversity ==
As of 2000, the total number of breeding waterbirds in the lagoon is 10,000 pairs, and an estimated 100,000 individuals visit the lagoon each year on migration.
