= Ion Prodan (serial killer) =

Moldovan-born serial killer

- Ion Prodan being interrogated by the police at a crime scene
- Born: Ion Andreevich Prodan; 13 August 1968 (age 58); Sărata Veche, Fălești District, Moldovan SSR
- Other names: "The Upyr of Domodedovo" "Hypnotizer" "Ivan the Maniac" "Nightwolf"
- Convictions: 5x counts of murder 17 counts of rape and robbery
- Penalty: 25 years of imprisonment in a strict regime penal colony

Details
- Victims: 5+
- Span of crimes: 1998–1999
- Country: Russia
- State: Moscow
- Date apprehended: March 1999

Ion Andreevich Prodan (Russian: Ион Андреевич Продан; born 13 August 1968), known as The Upyr of Domodedovo (Russian: Домодедовский упырь), is a Moldovan serial killer who committed his murders in the Moscow Oblast.

== Life before crimes ==
Ion Prodan was the eleventh and youngest child in a large and poor Moldovan family. His father was an alcoholic and frequently beat both his wife and children. In addition, Prodan was bullied by his elder siblings. After one such beating by his father, Prodan ran away from home. He was drawn to the railway for some reason, sometimes living in abandoned cars for weeks.

In school, Prodan was also being bullied, and never finished his education. The bullying continued during his military service in the construction battalion of the Leningrad Military District. As Prodan, whose surname literally translates as "sold" in Russian, would later tell, his squad-mates' favourite joke was: "Ion, how much have you been Prodan for?" Being a quick-tempered man, he did not forgive these offences.

After serving in the military, Prodan did not return to Moldova but decided to go to work in Moscow. Having no specialty or propiska, he could count only on seasonal work. So Prodan became a guest worker.

== Crimes ==
Prodan continued to haunt the railway. It was not far from where he would later commit most of his crimes, including his very first one.

On 2 September 1994, near the premises of the technical inspection of trains on the territory of the Moscow Kiyevskaya railway station, while drinking alcohol, Prodan killed and robbed his drinking companion, a carpenter named Vladimir Sladkov, by hitting his head with a short piece of a metal corner bead. In his later crimes, Prodan continued to use a corner bead as a weapon.

After the murder, Prodan escaped to St. Petersburg. In 1995, Prodan committed a robbery with the help of a man named Ryabov. Having spent 9 months in a pre-trial detention centre, he was sentenced to 4 years of probation.

Returning to Moscow, Prodan married a young woman from a rural locality in Kostroma Oblast. The family rented an apartment in house number 37 on the Leninsky Komsomol Avenue in the city of Vidnoye, Moscow Oblast. Prodan systematically beat and insulted his wife. He was especially angry with the fact they had a daughter instead of a son - to the point where he attempted to throw his wife off the sixth floor.

Prodan sent his family to Moldova. Unable to pay for housing, he began to spend his nights in the forest. At night, he went out hunting for women, whom he would beat on the head, rape and take their money and food.

When it got colder, Prodan again rented an apartment in Vidnoye. He returned to his wife and daughter, however, unable to withstand his abuse, they left for another city and never returned.

On 4 September 1998, on Bolotnikovskaya Street in Moscow, Prodan struck a fatal blow to the head of a random passer-by. He learned that he had killed the man via the media. Having committed another murder, he did not see a report about the crime. He then phoned the police and television via a pay phone. Calling the employees of both departments "slackers", he indicated the location of the corpse. The next day Prodan was pleased to watch the news report.

Experiencing problems having relationships with females, Prodan began to take revenge on women and men. Soon in the Domodedovsky and Leninsky districts of Moscow he began to perform a large series of rapes associated with robbery. In the city of Vidnoye, he'd beat up men, undress them and let them run nude down the streets. Prodan allegedly had bisexual tendencies.

However, Prodan realized that, despite his remarkable strength, he could not cope with every man. So he decided to master the art of hypnosis. Having read a book called "Hypnosis: Methodology and practice", Prodan believed that he had mastered hypnosis and tried to apply it to a passer-by. However, under the meditative gaze of Prodan, not only did the man undress and give all his money, but severely beat the attacker instead. After that, Prodan would begin all the hypnotic "sessions", hitting the head of a victim with a corner bead. Sometimes he improvised, using objects found at the locations of his crimes, like bottles or stones.

Prodan studied carefully the psychology of policemen whom, unsurprisingly, he came across all the time. He easily contacted them, sometimes even offering them drinks. Once, when Prodan was returning from another robbery, he was detained by a patrol. Seeing that his jacket was stained with the blood of the victim, he bit his hand and smeared the jacket with his own blood. He was treated with first aid, and then released.

Prodan's luck turned around after he killed a woman named Shevelkova, whom he accidentally met on a road, and found a bundle of money in her bag. Pleased with the discovery, the killer decided to catch a passing car. Seeing a stopped police car, he, having reached the place, inadvertently opened the bag to pay. Seeing the money, the police officers themselves robbed him and threw him out of the car. Prodan stood for a long time on the road, spewing curses at them.

Prodan returned to the crime scene, where he saw policemen interrogating a man named Henrik Arakelyan who found a bag with documents. Prodan, without knowing, was being recorded on a police camera. The investigation yielded no results, while Prodan tracked where Arakelyan was living, and the next day he killed the man and his daughter.

== Arrest, investigation and trial ==
Prodan was arrested for insulting police officers in early March 1999 and then imprisoned for 15 days. He behaved nervously in his cell, and later attempted suicide, pulling skin out of his stomach and striking a sharpened spoon into it. Prodan was taken to a hospital, which he escaped from, leaving a note: "Wait, I'll be back".

Prodan immediately went to his sister, who also lived in Vidnoye. There he was detained by police officers investigating the case of a serial rapist, robber and murderer. For nine days he remained silent. On the tenth day, he was summoned for interrogation, and in an interview with the investigator, a conversation began about Andrei Chikatilo. Literally sleeping on conversations, he suddenly announced: "Yes, he's just a puppy compared to me, this is your Chikatilo!", then he demanded a paper and pen, and wrote a candid confession, in which, nevertheless, he indicated only a small part of his crimes.

Prodan was very capricious. To make him talk, the investigator was forced to bring him bananas and other products the killer ordered from him.

Ion Prodan's list of crimes was impressive. During the 9 months of 1998–1999, he committed 58 proven attacks on women and men. Over 200 applications were checked in Moscow by the institution of criminal cases. At the same time, the facts of concealed attacks on women by officers were uncovered. When his apartment was searched, 300 names and suspicious women's items were found, including worn-out footwear. The owners of these items have not been established, as well as the true number of Prodan's victims.

After the forensic psychiatric examination found Prodan mentally competent to stand trial, he refuted his testimony. As a result, the court could prove only 5 murders and 17 rapes and robberies, and sentenced Ion Prodan to 25 years imprisonment in a strict regime penal colony. The Supreme Court of Russia upheld the verdict without change. In 2010, he was extradited to the Republic of Moldova and was released from Prison nr. 15-Cricova in 2014.

== In popular culture ==
- Криминальная Россия. «Домодедовский упырь» (2001).
- A look from the inside. Russian psychiatrist.

== See also ==
- Fyodor Prodan - nephew and fellow serial killer
- List of Russian serial killers
