= Sărățel =

Sărățel may refer to the following places in Romania:

- Sărățel, a village in Șieu-Măgheruș Commune, Bistrița-Năsăud County
- Sărățel, a village in Predeal-Sărari Commune, Prahova County
- Sărățel (Râmnicul Sărat), a tributary of the river Râmnicul Sărat in Vrancea County
- Sărățel (Buzău), a tributary of the river Buzău in Buzău County

== See also ==
- Sarata (disambiguation)
- Sărăteni (disambiguation)
- Sărulești (disambiguation)
