= Balaciu =

- Commune
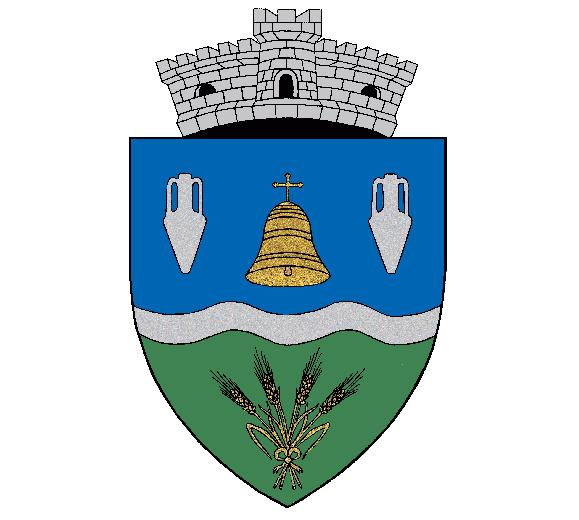
- Coat of arms

- Location in Ialomița County

- Location in Romania
- Coordinates: 44°37′N 26°53′E
- Country: Romania
- County: Ialomița

Government
  - Mayor (2020–2024): Cornel Mihu (PNL)
- Area: 124 km^{2} (48 sq mi)
- Elevation: 45 m (148 ft)
- Population (2021-12-01): 1,607
  - Density: 13.0/km^{2} (33.6/sq mi)
- Time zone: UTC+02:00 (EET)
  - Summer (DST): UTC+03:00 (EEST)
- Postal code: 927040
- Area code: +(40) 243
- Vehicle reg.: IL
- Website: www.balaciu.ro

Balaciu is a commune located in Ialomița County, Muntenia, Romania. It is composed of four villages: Balaciu, Copuzu, Crăsanii de Jos, and Crăsanii de Sus. It also included the village of Sărățeni until 2005, when it was split off to form Sărățeni Commune.

Historical population
Year	Pop.	±%
1899	1,484	—
1925	1,841	+24.1%
2002	2,045	+11.1%
2011	1,860	−9.0%
2021	1,607	−13.6%
Source: Census data
