= Cogâlnic =

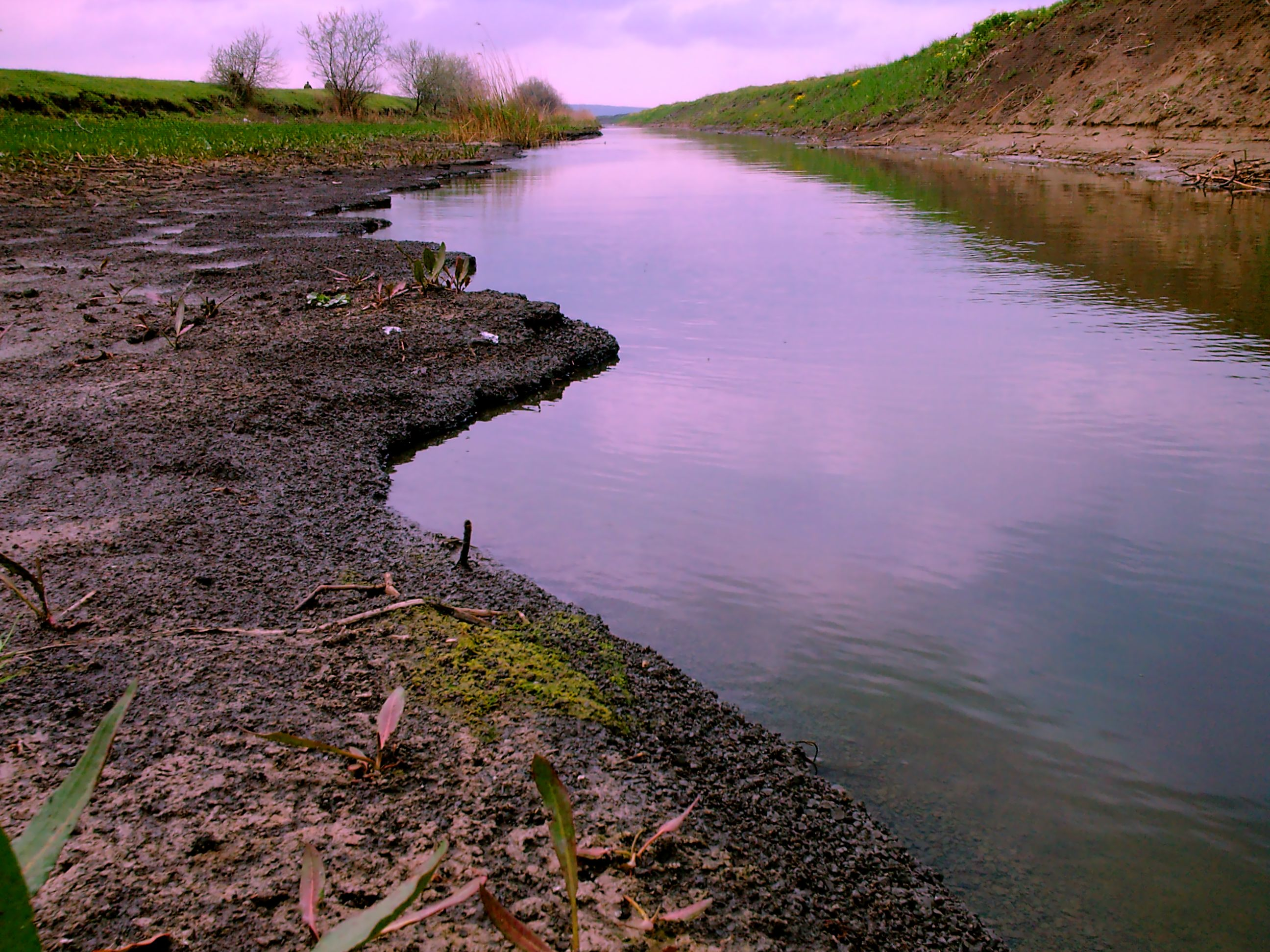
- The river in Bilhorod-Dnistrovskyi Raion, Odesa Oblast

Location
- Country: Moldova, Ukraine

Physical characteristics
- Source
  - location: Nisporeni District
- Mouth
  - location: Sasyk Lagoon
  - coordinates: 45.8019°N 29.6700°E
  - elevation: 0 m (0 ft)
- Length: 243 km (151 mi)
- Basin size: 3,910 km^{2} (1,510 sq mi)
- Discharge
  - average: 0.30 m^{3}/s (11 cu ft/s) (avg), 6.47 m^{3}/s (228 cu ft/s) (max), .0006 m^{3}/s (0.021 cu ft/s) (min)

The Cogâlnic (also spelled Cogîlnic, Kogylnik, Kogîlnic, Kohylnyk; Ukrainian: Когильник), or Kunduk (Ukrainian: Кундук) is a river in Moldova and southwestern Ukraine.

== Geography ==
The Cogâlnic rises in the hills of Nisporeni District in the Codri region west of the Moldovan capital, Chișinău. It flows through the Bessarabian Highland, crossing the cities of Hîncești, Cimișlia and Basarabeasca, and then into the Budjak, past Artsyz and into the Black Sea Lowland of Odesa Oblast (province) of Ukraine. Together with the Sarata River it enters the Sasyk Liman and thence into the Black Sea.

== History ==
Johann Erich Thunmann in his eighteenth century work described it:

In warm months, there is a great shortage of water. Even the largest river in this area, the Kogylnik, then dries, and it is often due to lack of water that the livestock of the Tatars die from thirst. In the autumn, when the rainy season starts, there appear suddenly appear countless streams across the low country. All of the marshes are then covered with puddles. To overcome the water shortages suffered in the summer, one finds very deep wells have been dug everywhere. Among the Tatars, as in the east, digging wells has become an act of religion and honor.
