= Flag of Cimișlia =

Moldovan municipal flag

- Use: Civil
- Proportion: 2:3
- Adopted: 30 June 2010; 16 years ago
- Design: A tricolor horizontal flag with a blue background and a yellow band in the middle
- Designed by: Silviu Andrieș-Tabac; Victor Hristov (painter)

The flag of Cimișlia (Romanian: Drapelul Cimișliei) is the official flag of the city of Cimișlia in Moldova. It is a simple horizontal tricolor, composed of blue stripes at the top and bottom and a yellow one in the middle. Blue represents the sky and other values and elements, while yellow signifies the richness of Cimișlia's cereals, very important in the history of the city. Previous proposals included the inclusion in the canton (corner) of the coat of arms of the city or a Tatar symbol called danga in Romanian.

The process for the adoption of a flag for Cimișlia was long. It began with a request by the mayor in March 2007. A contest was organized, but the proposals sent were ultimately rejected and the Cimișlia City Council asked the National Heraldry Commission (CNH) and a local painter for assistance. They designed a flag that after long discussions and changes was adopted on 30 June 2010.

== Design ==
The city of Cimișlia has a rectangular flag with a 2:3 ratio. It is blue, with a yellow bar covering one fifth of the flag. Blue represents the color of the sky, infinity, dreams and a peaceful and free life. On the other hand, yellow represents the richness of cereals. Cimișlia was a highly important locality due to its cereal trade, which managed to exceeded 500,000 rubles. Today, agriculture remains important in the city's economy. According to one of the authors of the flag, it was designed using vexillological methods based on the coat of arms, preserving all its meanings.

== History ==
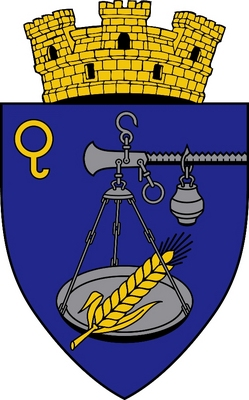
The coat of arms of Cimișlia, which was the basis for the flag and was used on it in earlier versions

In March 2007, the mayor of Cimișlia, Ion Alexandreanu, requested the collaboration of the National Heraldry Commission (CNH) to create a coat of arms and flag for the city. The preparatory documentation for this lasted a year, and in early 2008, a competition was announced. Participants would send their submissions for a coat of arms and flag, being 12 March 2008 the deadline. Contest winners would win two cash prizes of 1000 lei (almost $100 then) each. On 10 March, the Cimișlia City Council issued a decision setting up a commission to elaborate the city's symbols and approving its working regulations. This commission consisted of ten people. The president was the mayor Gheorghe Răileanu (who had replaced Alexandreanu), while the secretary was Radion Nechit, a specialist in juvenile and sportive problems. Another notable member was the vice mayor Sergiu Pleșca, whose actions were decisive during the process in later years.

The winner of the contest was the geography teacher Eremei Lavric. He received the award of 1000 lei and became the leader of the process for the adoption of a flag and coat of arms. For the former, he had a proposal. It would consist of a horizontal bicolor flag composed of a yellow strip and a lilac one, with the coat of arms he proposed in the middle. Lavric's proposals presented several artistic, heraldic and semantic problems, and some of the elements he used were not considered sufficiently "individualizing" by the local authorities.

At the end of 2008, the Cimișlia City Council requested the assistance of the CNH and the painter Victor Hristov, a native of Cimișlia, to make new designs. Therefore, the heraldist and vexillologist Silviu Andrieș-Tabac (a member of the CNH) made a flag, painted by Hristov. It was rectangular with a blue background and a yellow strip in the middle. In addition, it had a danga (a tool for livestock) in the canton (corner). This danga, also yellow, represented a Tatar tribe known in Romanian as the ciumeci from which the name of Cimișlia originates. The danga consisted of a ring with a line, straight at first and inverted at the end. This tricolor was supported and liked by various citizens. Regarding the coat of arms, Hristov and Andrieș-Tabac designed a project.

Both proposals were drawn up in December 2008 and artistically and technically defined at the end of March 2009. After this, they were presented to the local authorities. The mayor of Cimișlia, with doubts about their quality, requested on 2 June 2009 an examination by the CNH of the two symbols to discuss them later in a city council meeting. The local authorities decided to separate the question of the flag and the coat of arms and on 16 June, they approved the coat of arms for the city. The CNH approved the coat of arms and the flag on 18 June, and later, it suggested the creation of alternative flag projects the City Council could agree with.

Andrieș-Tabac tried to convince the local authorities to use the original project, and on 4 February 2010, the Cimișlia City Council approved the flag, replacing the danga with the city's coat of arms after debating the possibility. The latter is composed of a Roman silver balance in whose weighing pan is a golden ear of grain. The same day, the regulations for the use of the flag were approved. In order to start raising the flag over the town hall of the city, the CNH had to approve this flag first. However, the CNH rejected it on 26 May, reporting that it did not follow vexillological rules as the coat of arms at the corner of the flag was very complicated and unrecognizable from a certain distance. The CNH proposed reusing the original project or removing any emblem from the canton. At the end, on 30 June 2010, the City Council approved a flag with nothing in the corner. The danga was kept in the coat of arms.

The adoption of the flag and the coat of arms was ultimately confirmed on 25 March 2015 after the decision nr. 324-IV.01 of the CNH.

== See also ==
- Coat of arms of Cimișlia
