= Iurceni =

- Commune and village
- Location in Moldova
- Coordinates: 47°05′N 28°16′E
- Country: Moldova
- District: Nisporeni District

Population (2014)
  - Total: 1,764
- Time zone: UTC+2 (EET)
  - Summer (DST): UTC+3 (EEST)

Iurceni is a commune in Nisporeni District, Moldova. It is composed of two villages, Iurceni and Mîrzoaia.

== Gallery ==
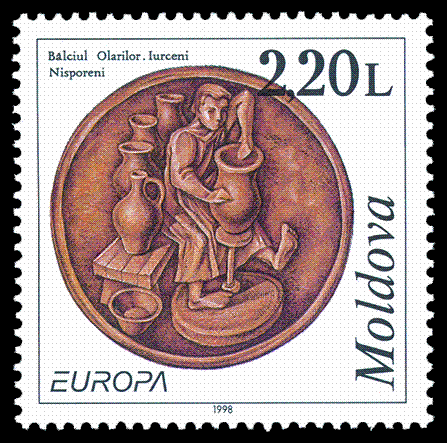
