= Cimișlia =

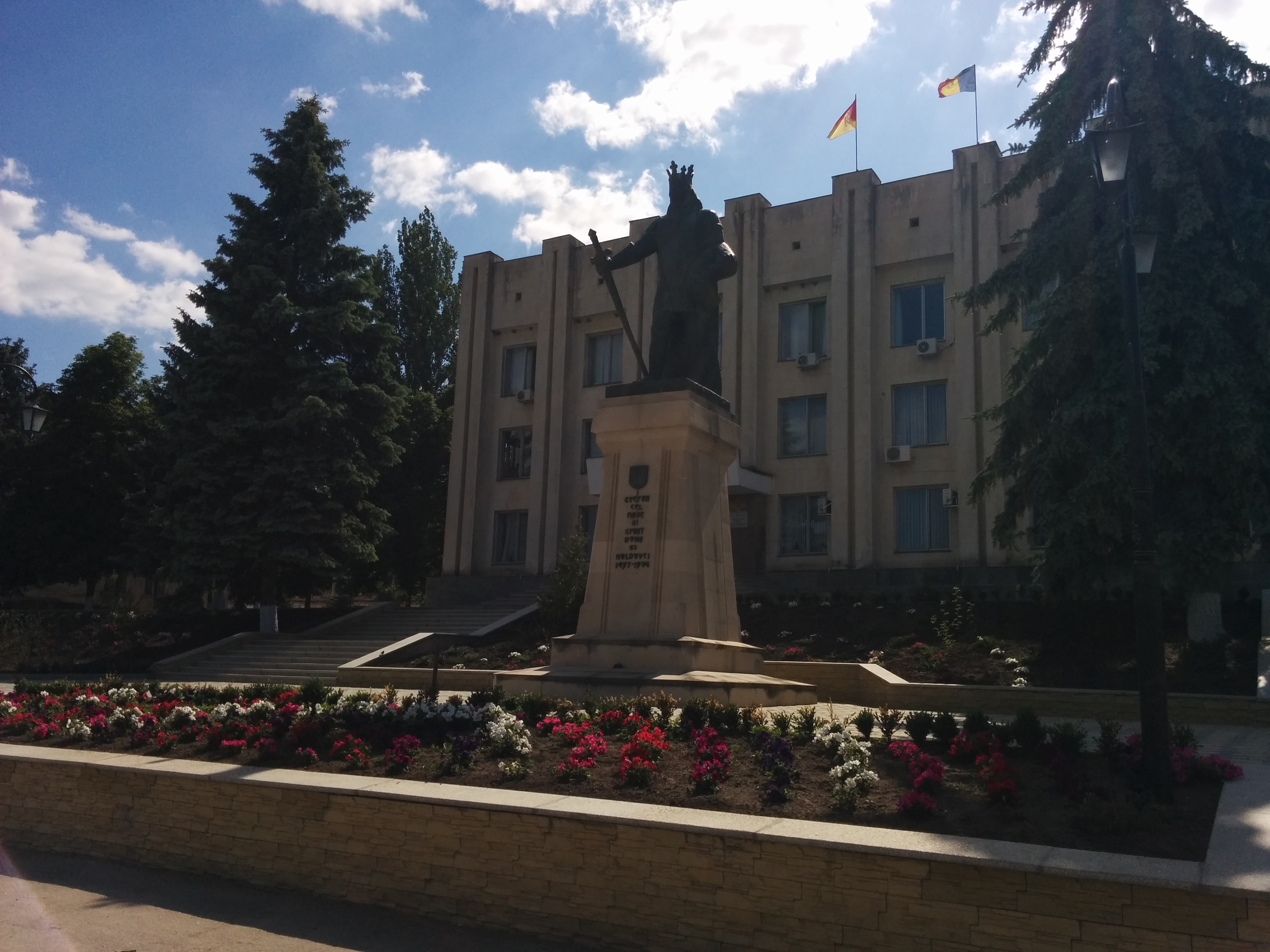
- Statue of Stephen the Great in the center of the town

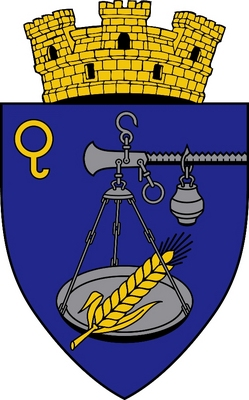
- Flag Coat of arms

- Location within Moldova
- Coordinates: 46°30′N 28°48′E
- Country: Moldova
- County: Cimișlia District

Government
  - Mayor: Sergiu Andronachi (ACUM, 2019–present)

Population (2014)
  - Total: 11,997 (2,014)
- Time zone: UTC+2 (EET)
  - Summer (DST): UTC+3 (EEST)
- Area code: +373 241
- Climate: Dfb

Cimișlia (Romanian pronunciation: [tʃimiʃˈli.a]) is a town located in the southern part of Moldova situated on the banks of the Cogâlnic River, between the capital of Chișinău and the autonomous territorial unit of Gagauzia. Cimişlia had a population of 11,997 according to the 2014 census. The town is also the seat/administrative center (Romanian: oraș-reședință) of Cimișlia District. It also administers three villages as follows: Bogdanovca Nouă, Bogdanovca Veche, and Dimitrovca.

== History ==
The first written mention of Cimişlia dates from 4 July 1620, when the savant Vladimir Nicu explained that a local legend had given the town its name from an unknown origin word meaning "wealth". The priest Iacob Iusipescu, who made the first attempt at a written history of Cimişlia in 1874, explained that in fact it was a word of unknown origin, but cimiş was the name given to construction workers and bricklayers at that time, used by Romanian and Tatar alike.

The basis for the name might also lie in a bucolic legend of lovers, Cimiş şi Lia (Cimiş and Lia), for whom jewels appeared, birds sang, and springs appeared from the earth.

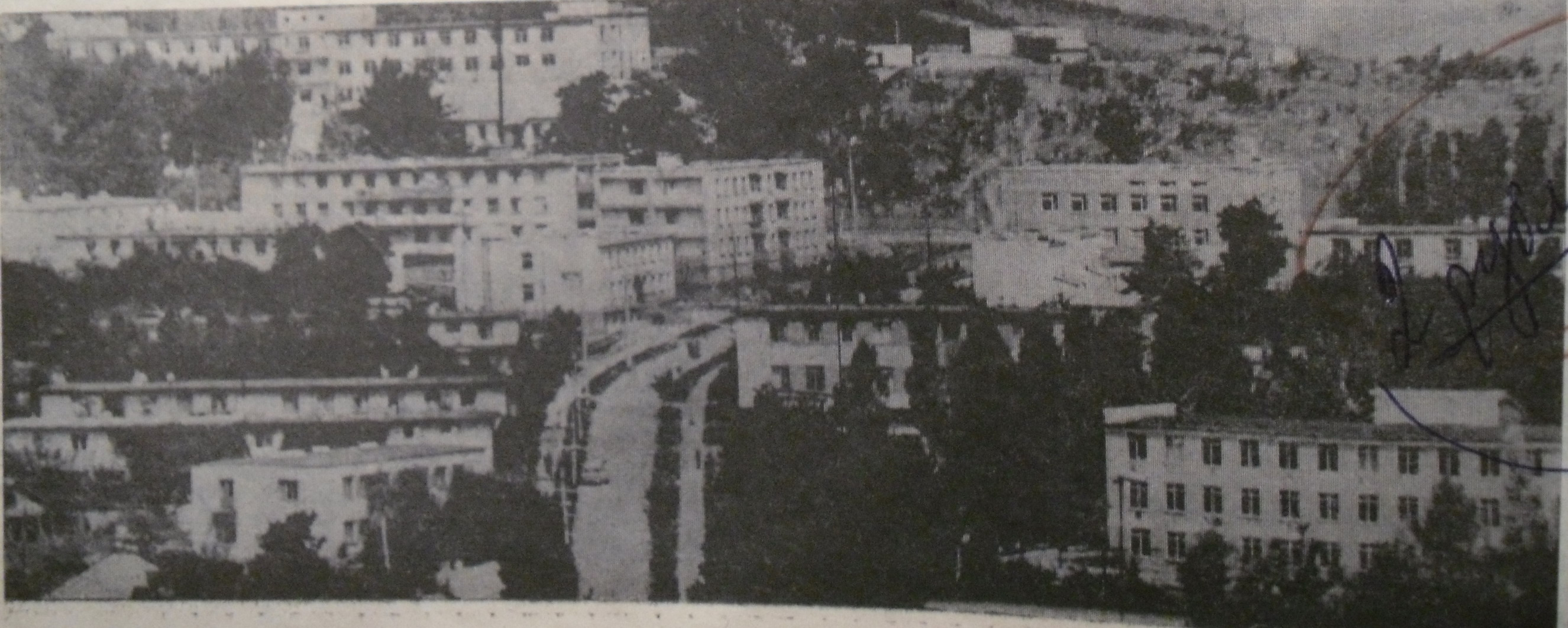
Panoramic view of Cimișlia in 1976, when the Republic of Moldova was still under the Soviet Union as the Moldavian Soviet Socialist Republic.

In fact, the reality of the locale is much harsher. Although in 1827 Cimişlia became an administrative center, many of its residents died of a plague and there was need of a special cemetery in the southeast part of town. Situated on the steppe of Budjak, by the Cogâlnic river, the city has often suffered from the droughts typical of the area. Dimitrie Cantemir, referring to this river in his work Descriptio Moldaviae, says "...one could say that it doesn't arise from a spring: it is only full after the rains of autumn and only then can one call it even a rivulet. All summer it is dry..." This would apply as well in our time.

In 1840 the locality received a statute as a market town. Its first school opened in 1844, and in 1885 the "hospital" of Zemstva (treating both people and animals). Between the two World Wars, (1918–1940), Cimişlia formed part of Tighina County or Ținutul Nistru; later, as part of the Soviet Union, it became a district center.

== Location ==
Cimişlia is in Raionul Cimişlia, Moldova, on the banks of the river Cogâlnic.

It is located 73 km (45 mi) from the capital, Chişinău, at the intersection of several of the country's more important roads: it is on the route from Chişinău to Bolgrad or Giurgiuleşti, and is also on the Tiraspol – Leova road. It is 30 km (19 mi) from Comrat, 57 km (35 mi) from Căuşeni, 35 km (22 mi) from Hînceşti, 28 km (17 mi) from Basarabeasca, and 52 km (32 mi) from Leova, at latitude 46°30'10" N. longitude 28°48'30" E.

The city proper covers 2.084 km^{2} (0.805 sq mi); the associated area extends to 146.12 km^{2} (56.42 sq mi), including 84.13 km^{2} (32.48 sq mi) of agricultural land, including orchards and pasture.

== Economy ==
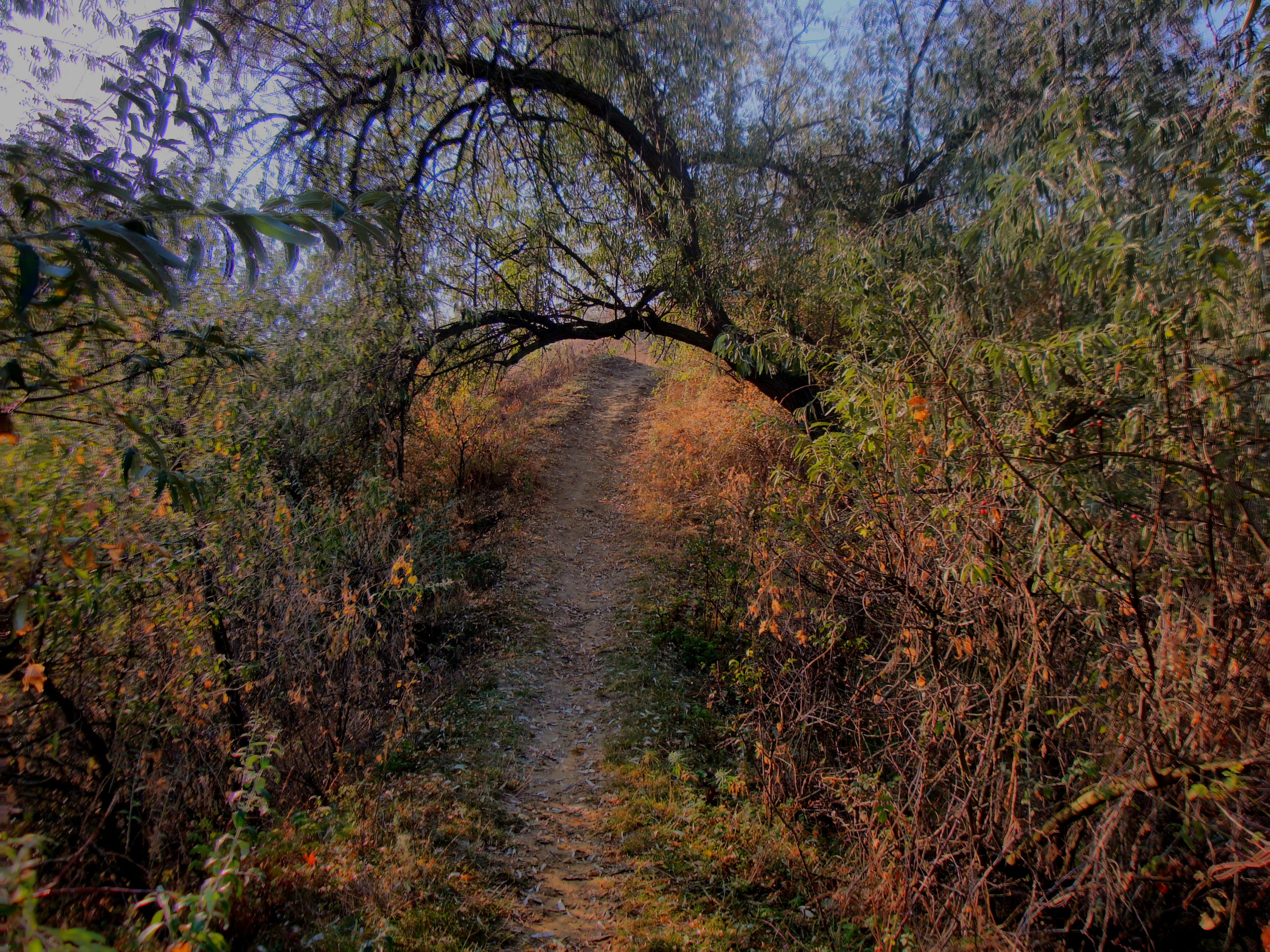
The Cimișlia Ravines (Romanian: Râpele de la Cimișlia), representing a natural heritage site in the Republic of Moldova.

The economy consists mainly of an agro-industrial complex with a well-developed network of manufacturing agricultural products, including meat, dairy, tree-fruit, and grain farming, as well as winemaking.

The Cimişlia railroad station, which takes advantage of the broad network of links toward the warehouses of the industrial and commercial companies of the city, is located in the village Mihailovka at a distance of 12 km.

=== Mineral resources ===
Fossil deposits on a territory of 2.56 km^{2} (0.99 sq mi) in bluffs in the southeast of the city were discovered by I. Suhov in 1932 to contain bones, the remains of Hipparion fauna of the Turolian type, which were studied and described in numerous monographs published in Bucharest (I. Simionescu et al.) and Moscow (L. Gabunia). This deposit is of interest for geological correlations and paleogeographic reconstruction. It has been proposed that it become a scientific reserve.

== Notable people ==
- Iulian Grigoriță (born 1971), Moldovan diplomat
- Iurie Leancă, former Prime Minister of Moldova between 2013 and 2015, former Liberal Democratic Party (PLDM) politician, current European People's Party (PPEM) leader
- Alexandru Leancă, actor
- Gheorghe Șalaru, Liberal Party (PL) politician, former Minister of Environment, and historian

== Gallery ==
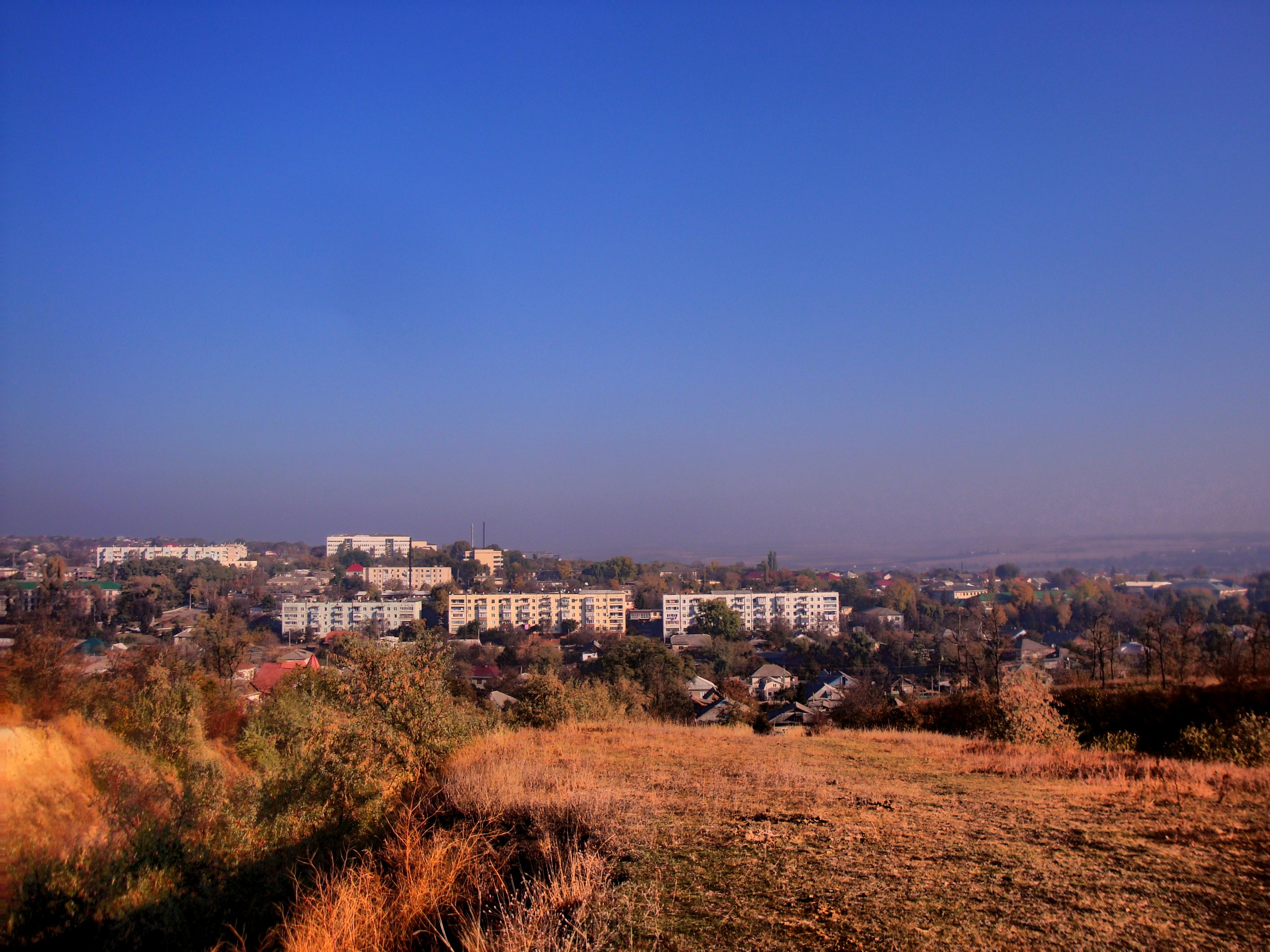
Panoramic view over Cimișlia at sunset, with its hilly ravines in the background

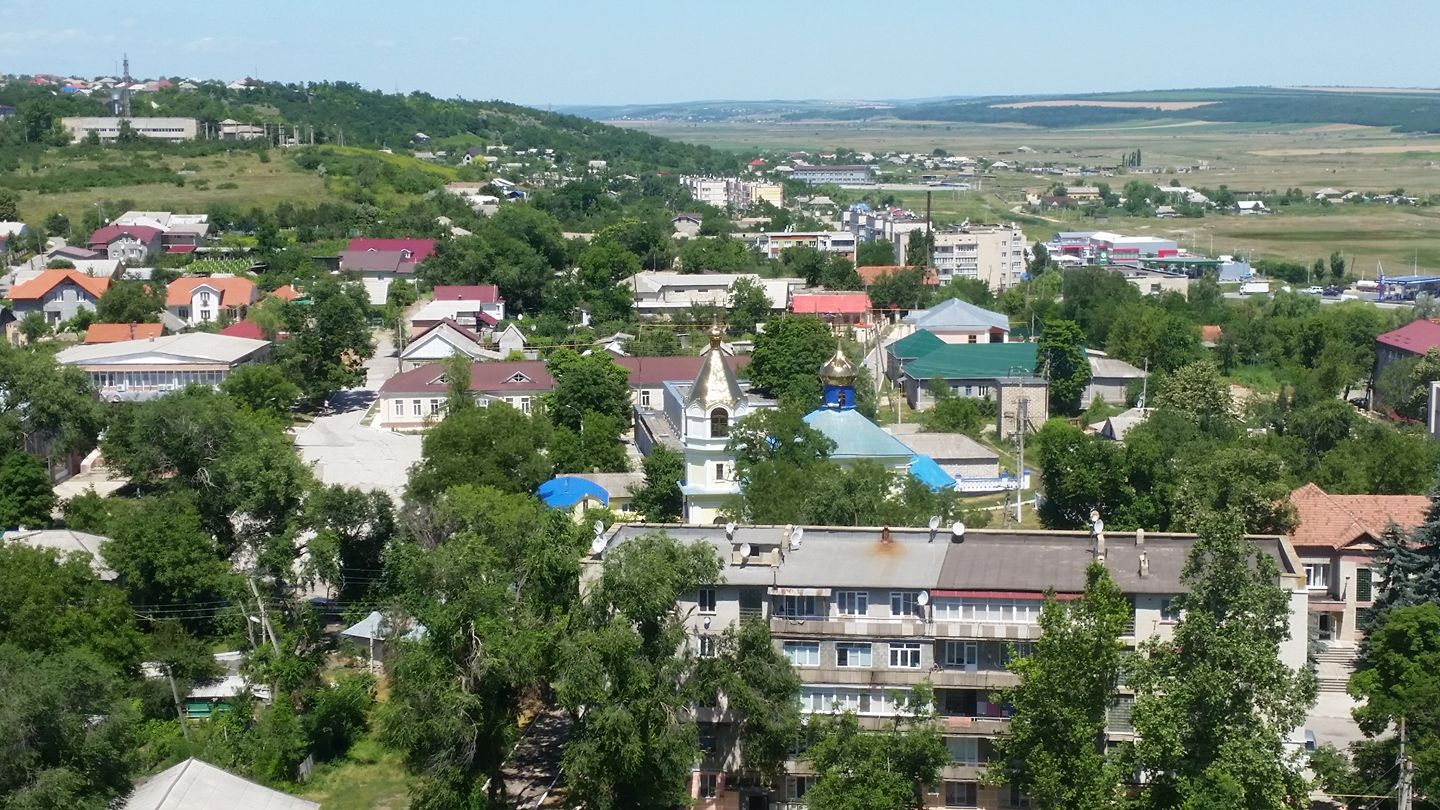
Panoramic view over Cimișlia during daytime (2017)

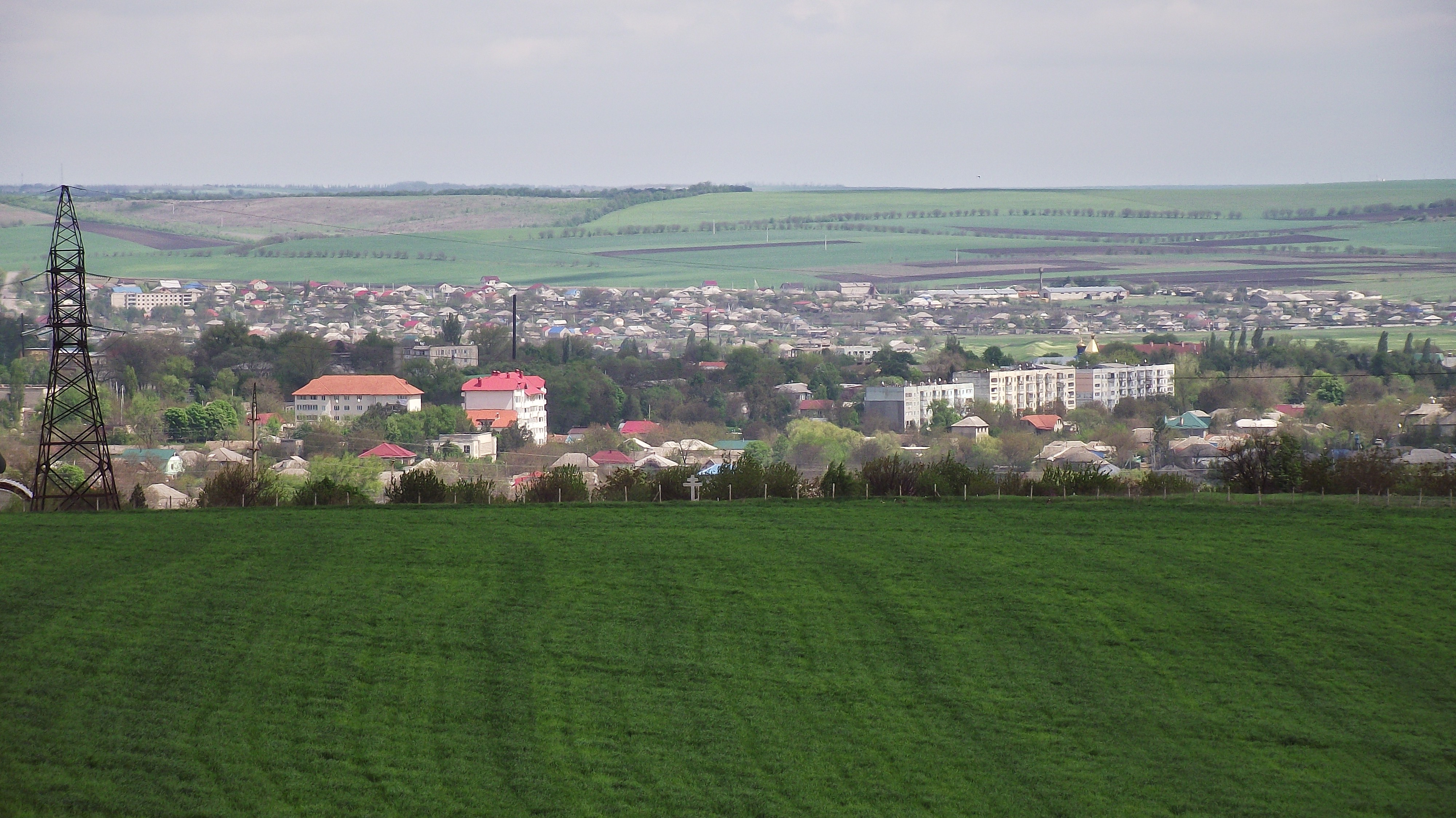
Panoramic view of Cimișlia, as seen from a nearby green hill

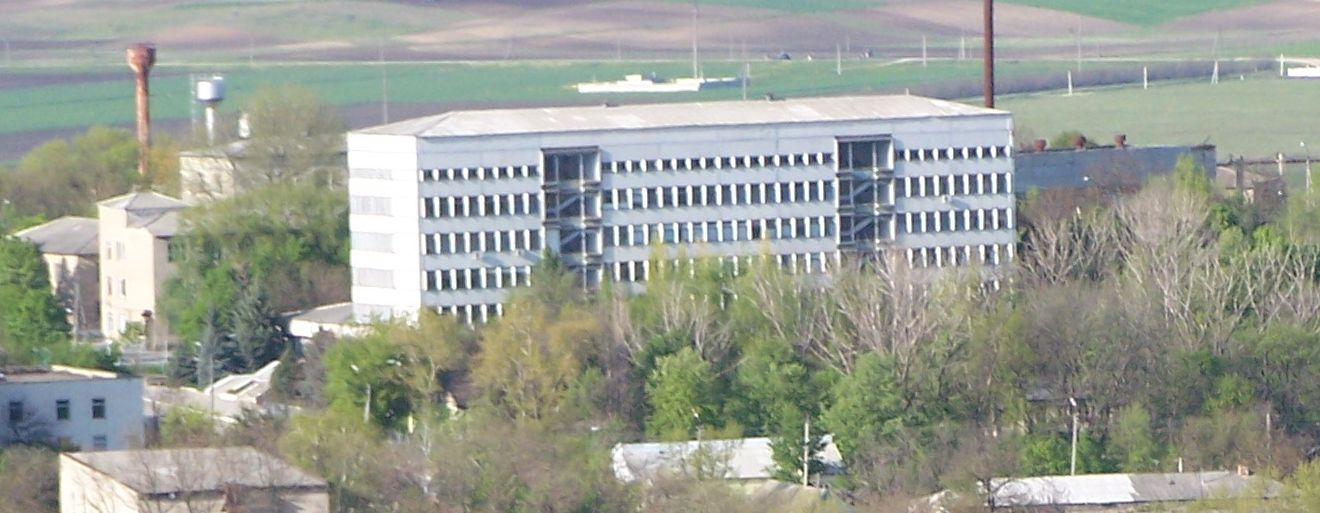
The local polyclinic

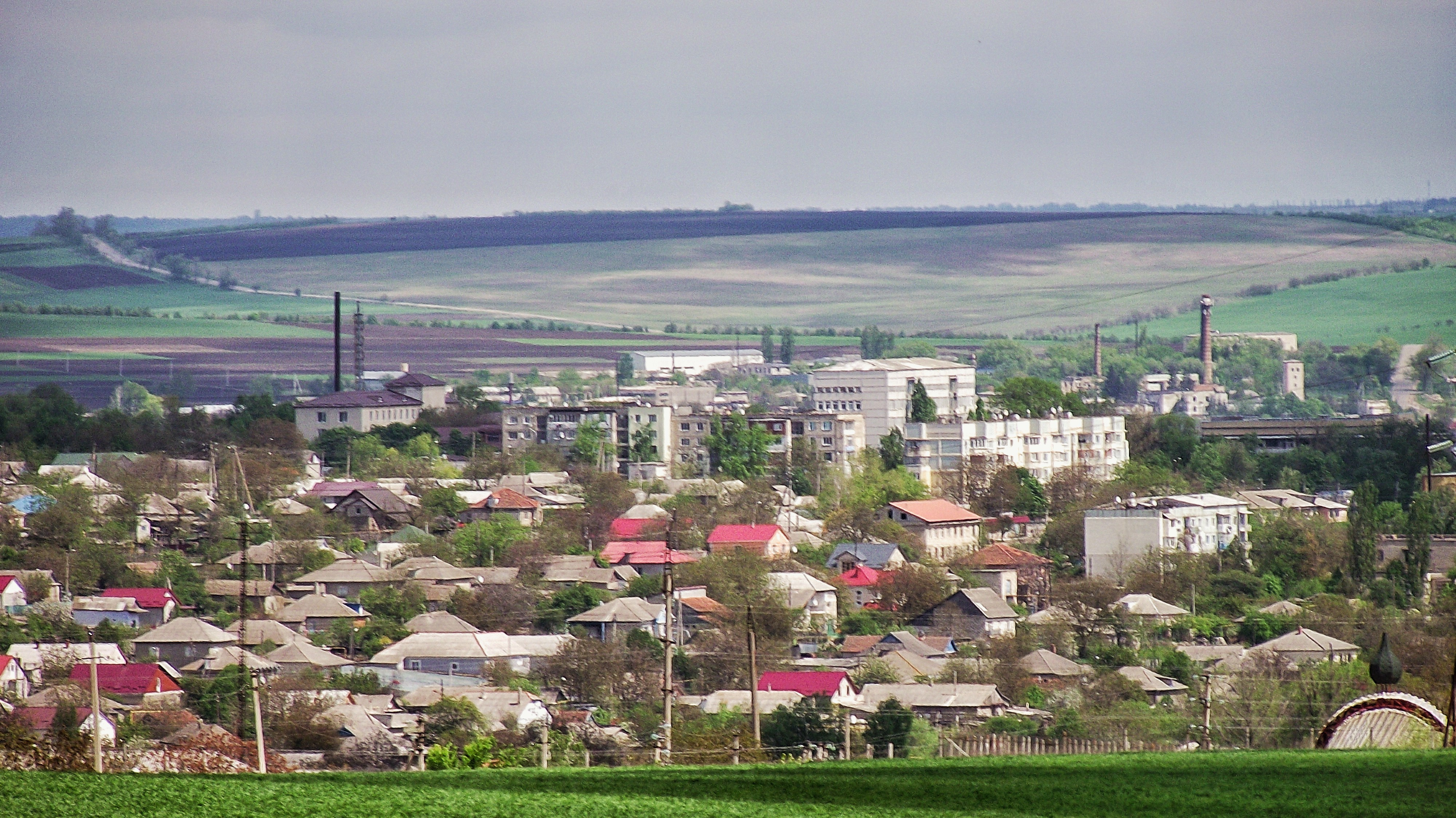
Panoramic view of a part of the town

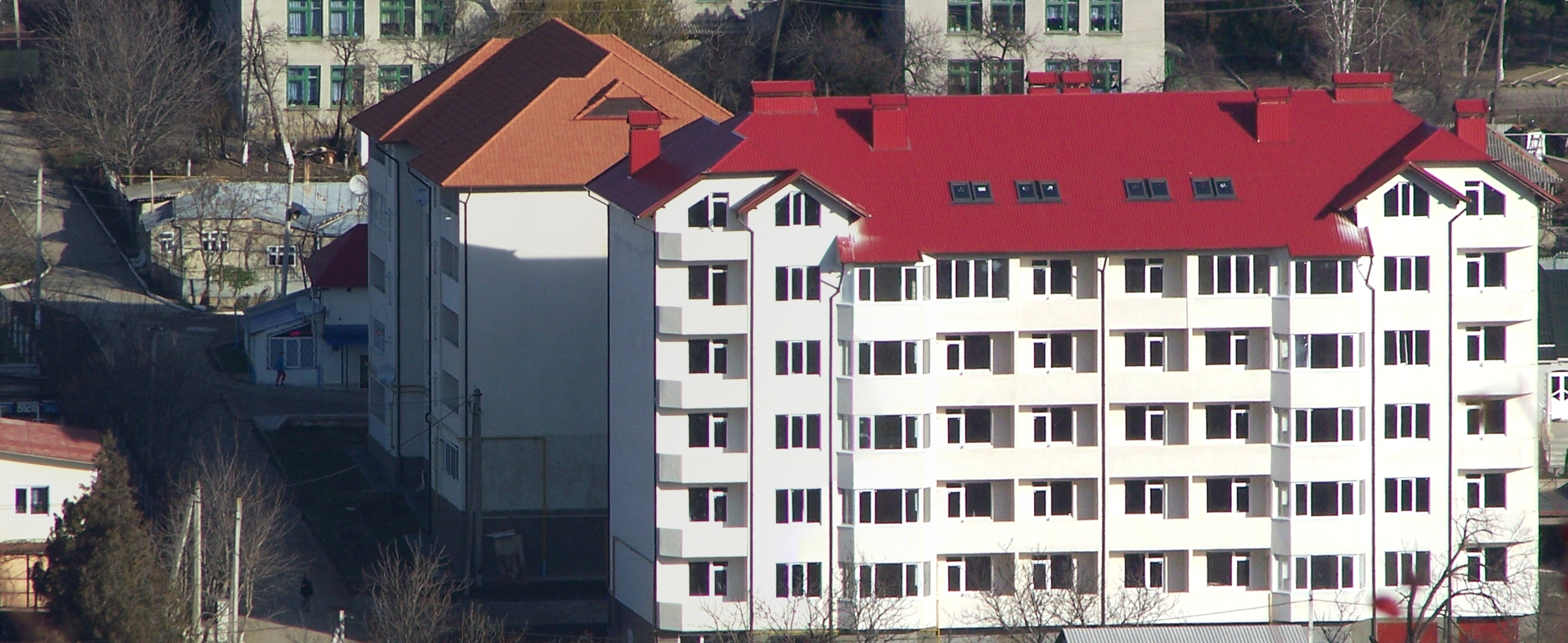
New residential apartment blocks in Cimișlia built during the late 2000s

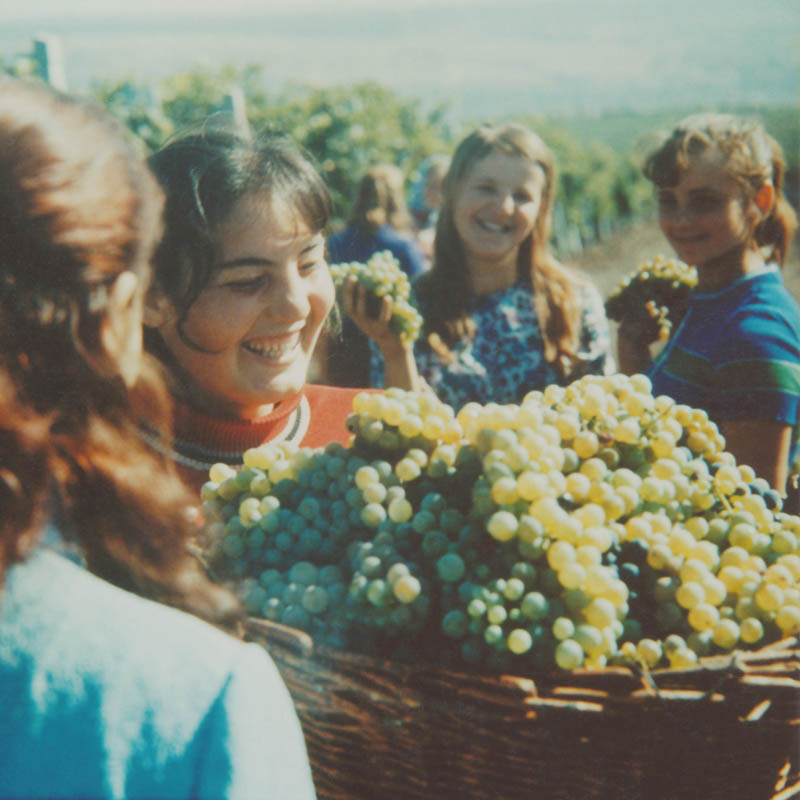
Grape harvest in the early 1970s

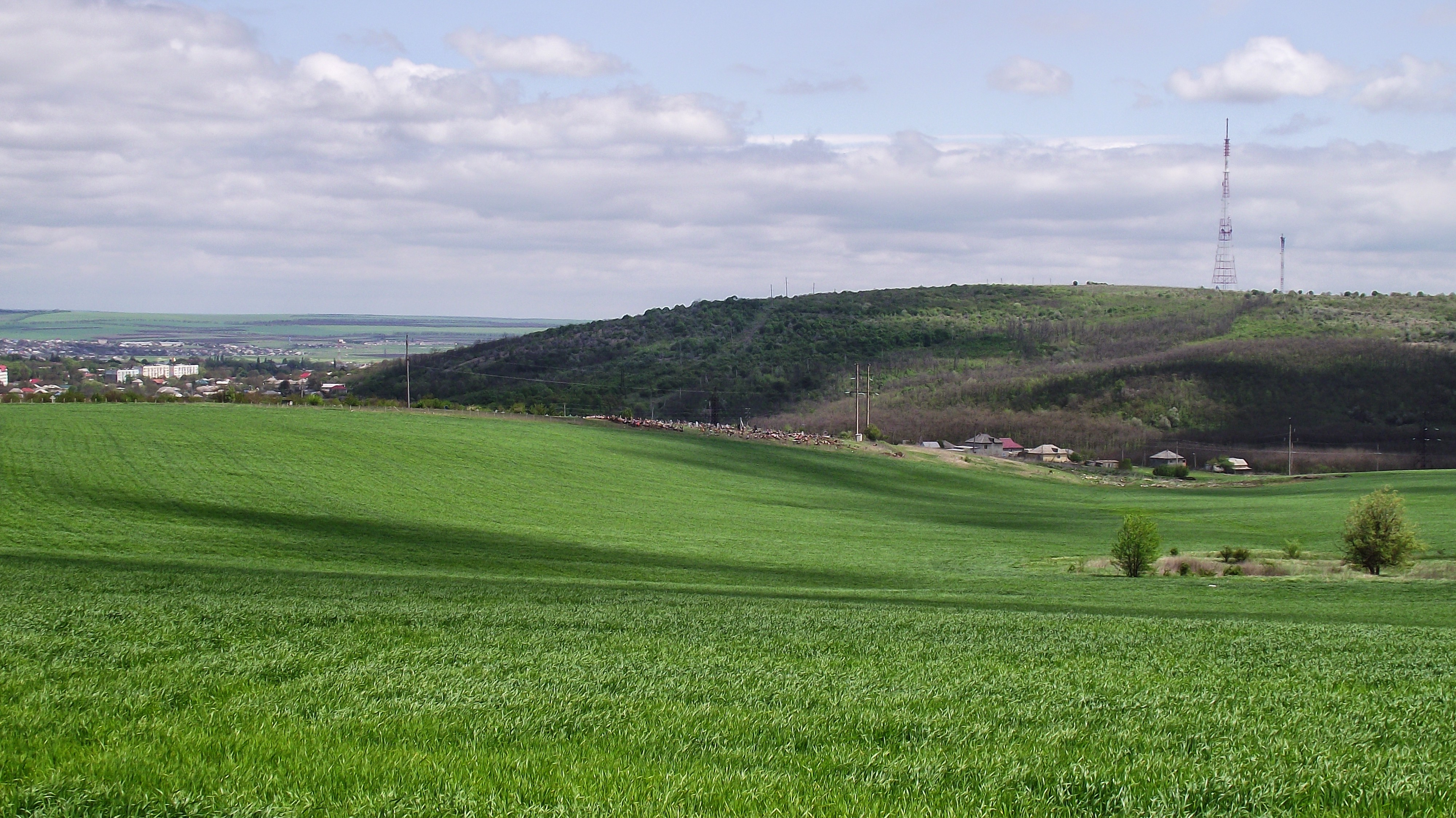
Meadows near Cimișlia

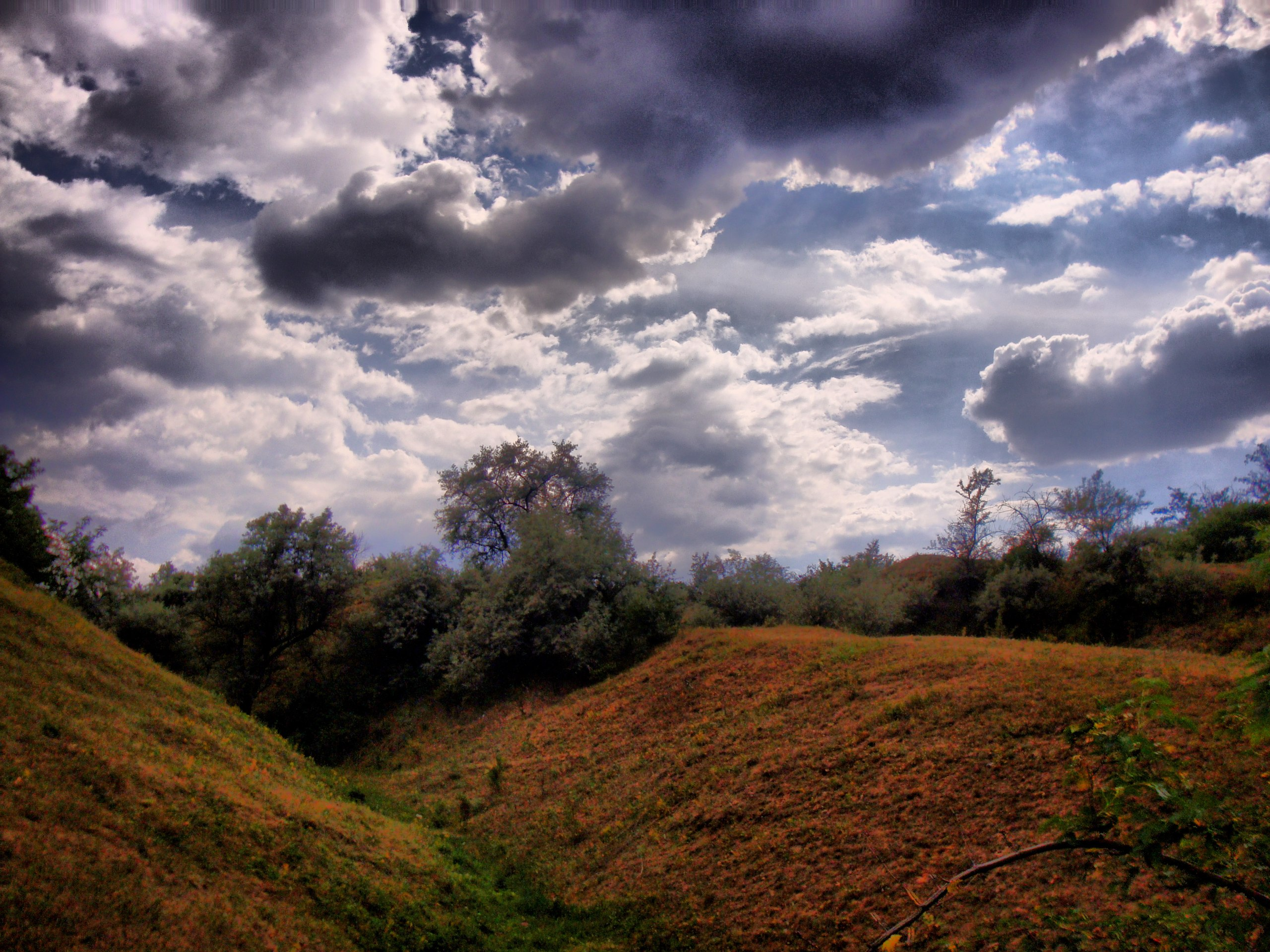
Cimișlia ravines

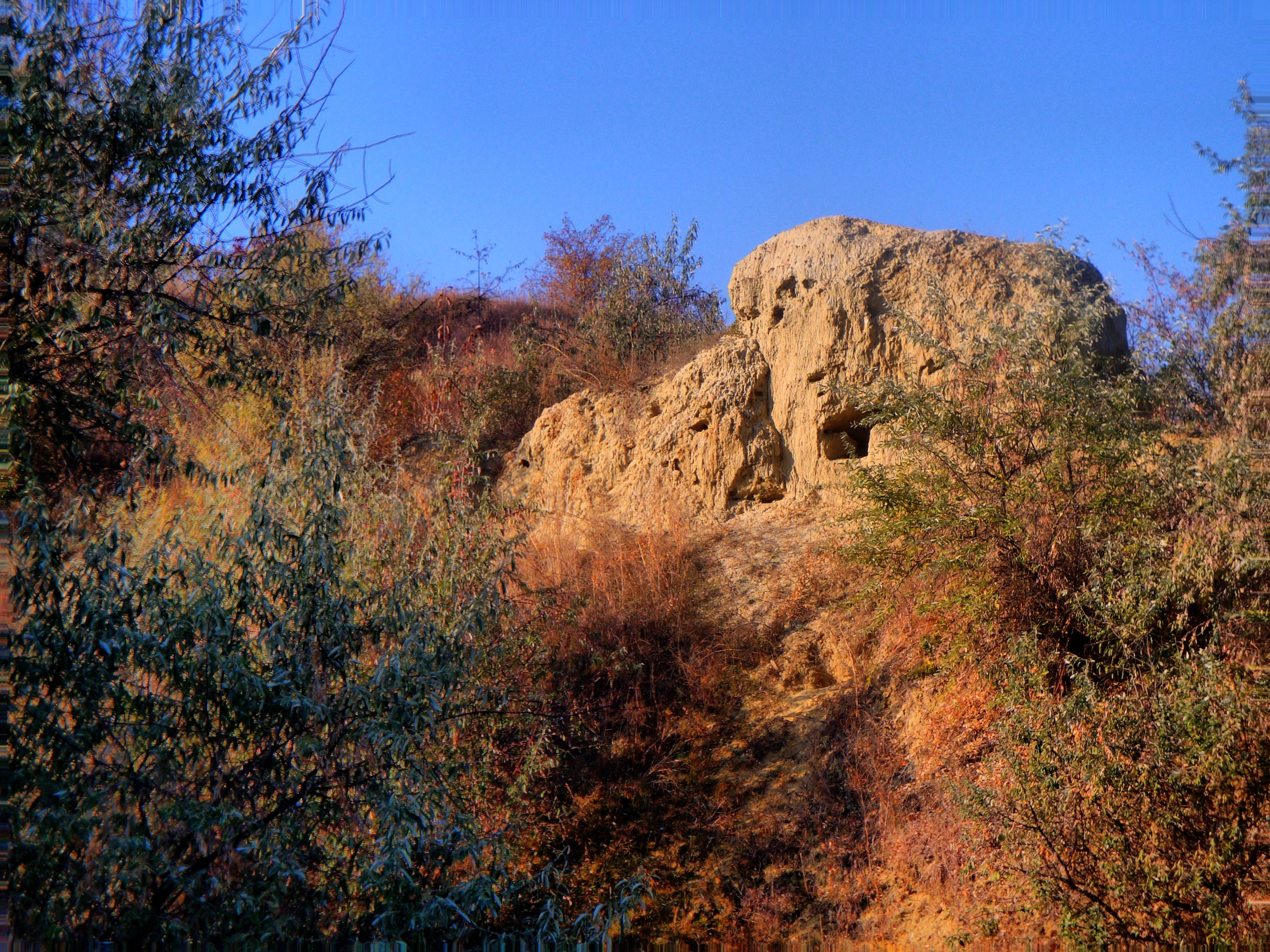
Cimișlia ravines

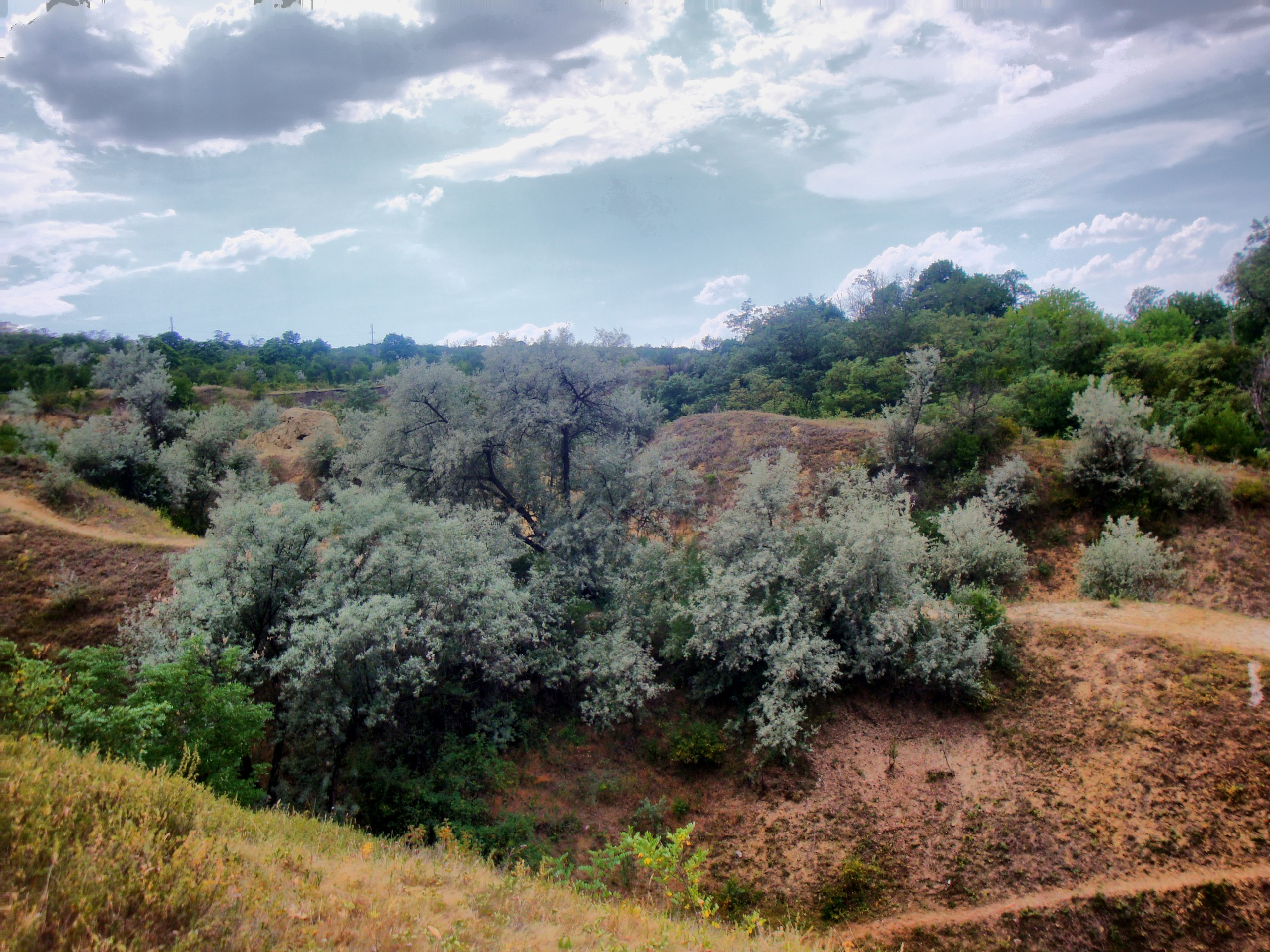
Cimișlia ravines

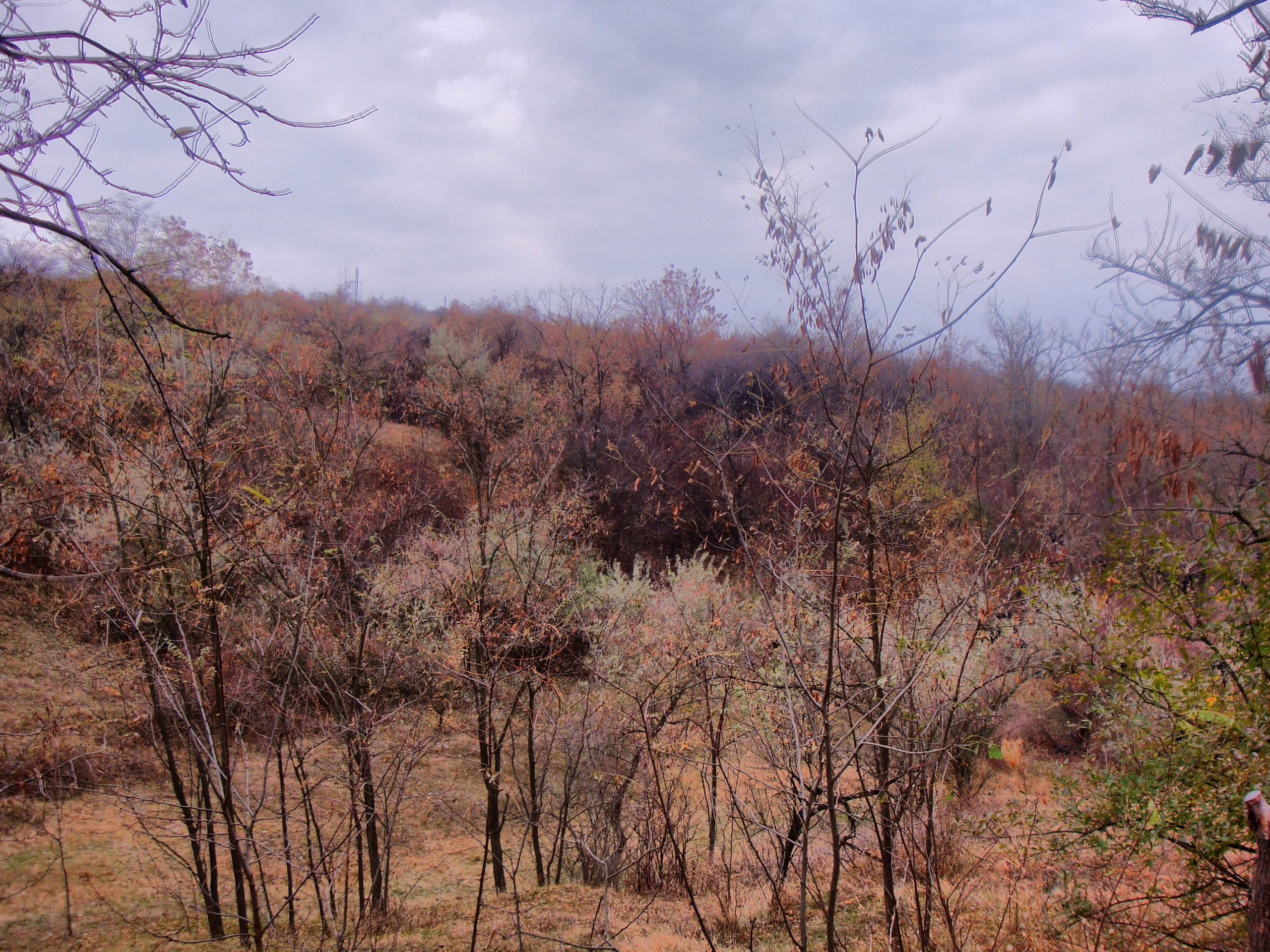
Cimișlia ravines

== International relations ==
=== Twin towns – Sister cities ===
Cimișlia is twinned with:

- Câmpina, Romania
- Gmina Rokiciny, Poland
- Hârlău, Romania
- Huși, Romania
- Nowogród Bobrzański, Poland
- Vălenii de Munte, Romania
- Vileyka, Belarus
