= Sărățeni, Ialomița =

Sărățeni
- Commune
- Location in Ialomița County

- Location in Romania
- Coordinates: 44.6588°N 26.9485°E
- Country: Romania
- County: Ialomița

Government
  - Mayor (2024‐2028): Eugen Tocileanu (PNL)
- Area: 34.3 km^{2} (13.2 sq mi)
- Population (2021-12-01): 1,091
  - Density: 31.8/km^{2} (82.4/sq mi)
- Time zone: UTC+02:00 (EET)
  - Summer (DST): UTC+03:00 (EEST)
- Postal code: 927044
- Area code: +(40) 243
- Vehicle reg.: IL
- Website: www.primariasarateni.ro

Sărățeni is a commune located in Ialomița County, Muntenia, Romania. It is composed of a single village, Sărățeni, and was part of Balaciu Commune prior to being split off in 2005.

Historical population
Year	Pop.	±%
1899	918	—
1925	1,050	+14.4%
2002	1,359	+29.4%
2011	1,290	−5.1%
2021	1,091	−15.4%
Source: Census data
