= Sărata-Răzeși =

- Village
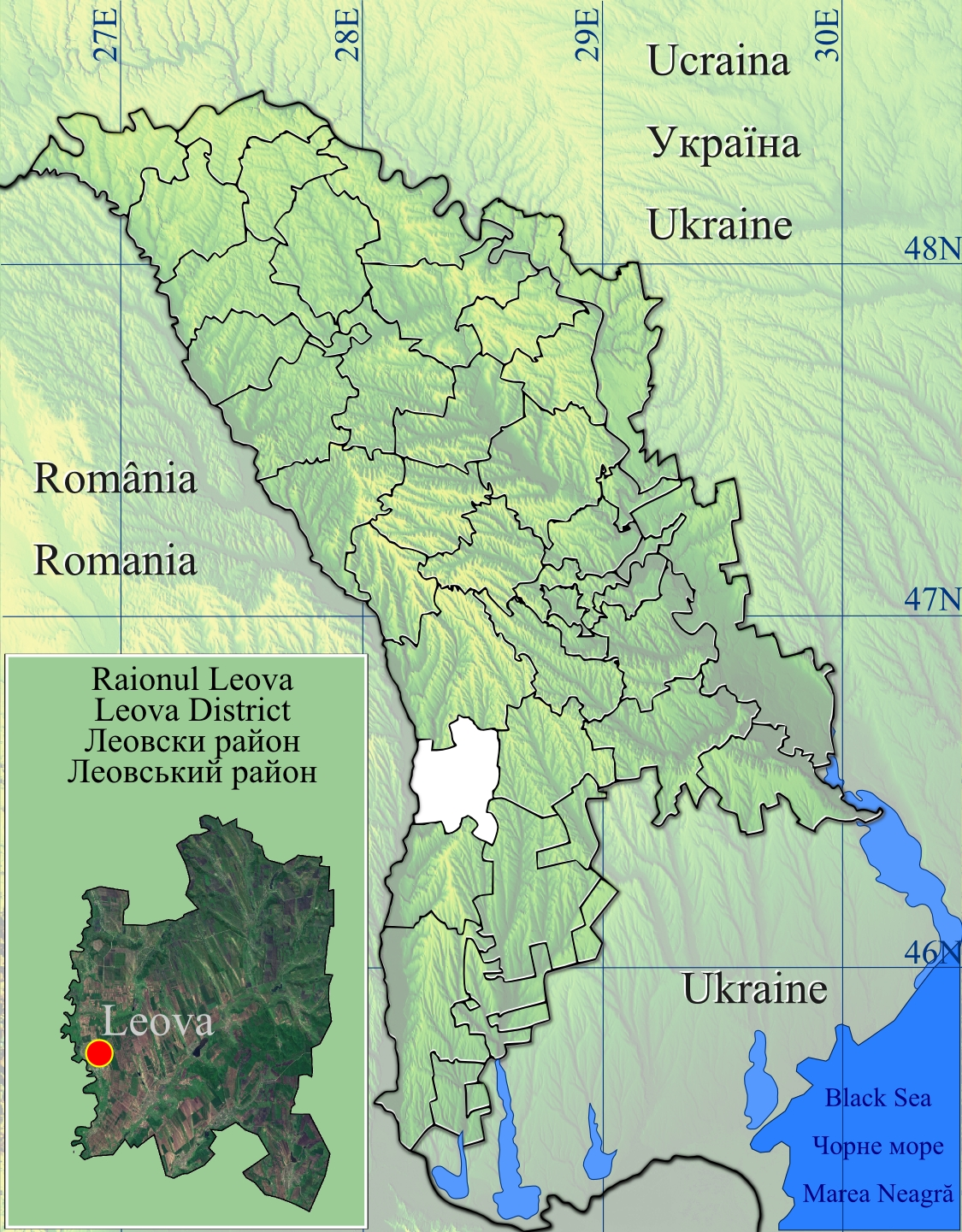
- Location within Moldova Leova
- Coordinates: 46°36′54″N 28°15′53″E
- Country: Moldova
- District: Leova District

Government
  - Mayor: Simion Tomșa (PDM)

Area
  - Total: 9 km^{2} (3.5 sq mi)
- Elevation: 67 m (220 ft)

Population (2014 census)
  - Total: 1,070
- Time zone: UTC+2 (EET)
  - Summer (DST): UTC+3 (EEST)
- Postal code: MD-6325

Sărata-Răzeși is a village in Leova District, Moldova.
