= Sarata (disambiguation) =

Sarata may refer to:

- Sarata, an urban-type settlement in Tatarbunary Raion, Odesa Oblast
- Sarata Raion, a former raion located in the Odesa Oblast of Ukraine, with its administrative center in Sarata
- Sarata (river), a river in Ukraine and Moldova
- Sarata (moth), a genus of moths in the family Pyralidae

== See also ==
- Sărata (disambiguation)
