= Pașcani, Hîncești =

Pașcani
- Commune
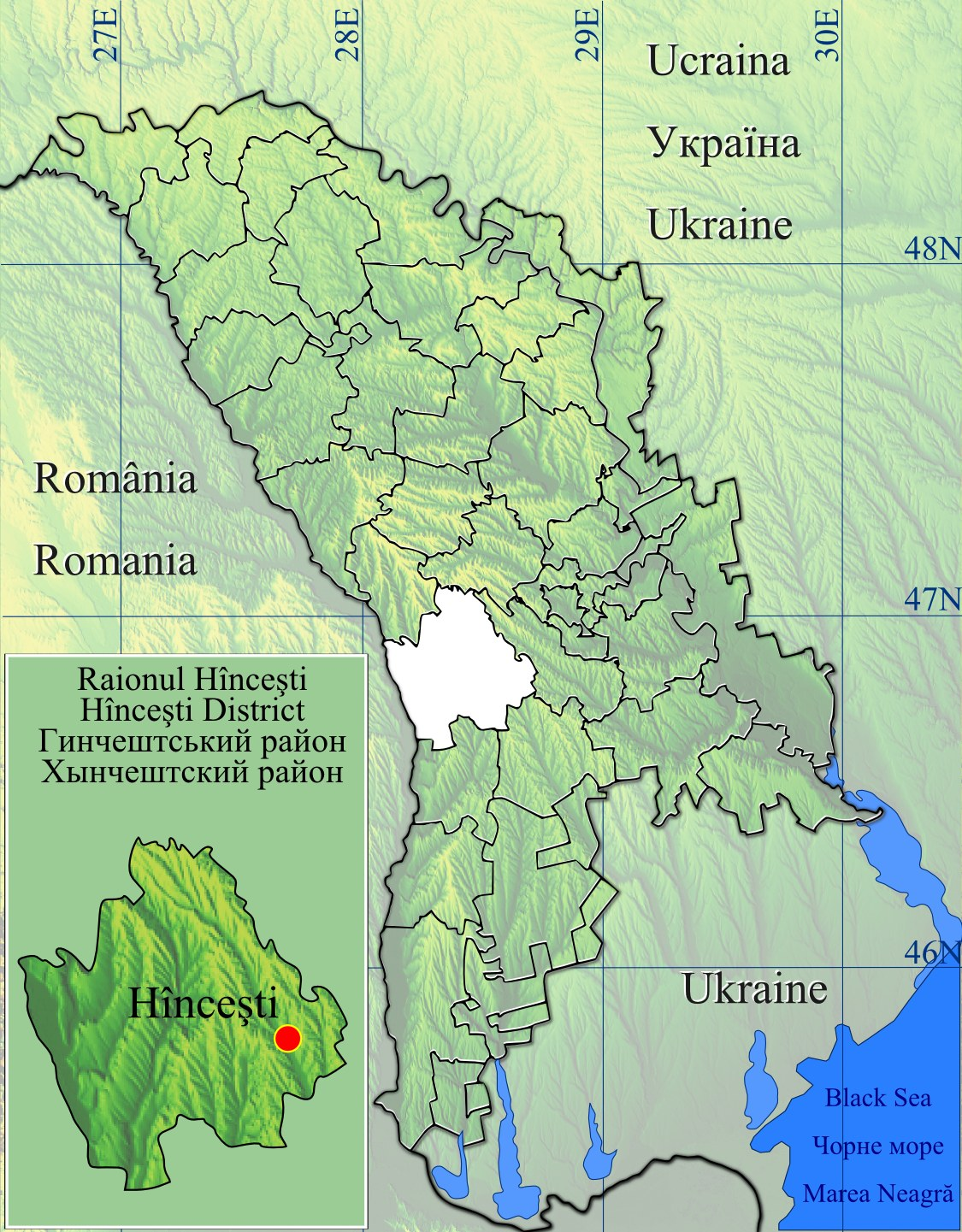
- Location within Hîncești
- Coordinates: 46°58′N 28°22′E
- Country: Moldova
- District: Hîncești District
- Elevation: 120 m (390 ft)

Population (2014)
  - Total: 2,400
- Time zone: UTC+2 (EET)
  - Summer (DST): UTC+3 (EEST)
- Postal code: MD-3442

Pașcani is a commune in Hîncești District, Moldova. It is composed of two villages, Pașcani and Pereni.
