= Sarata (river) =

Sarata Sărata
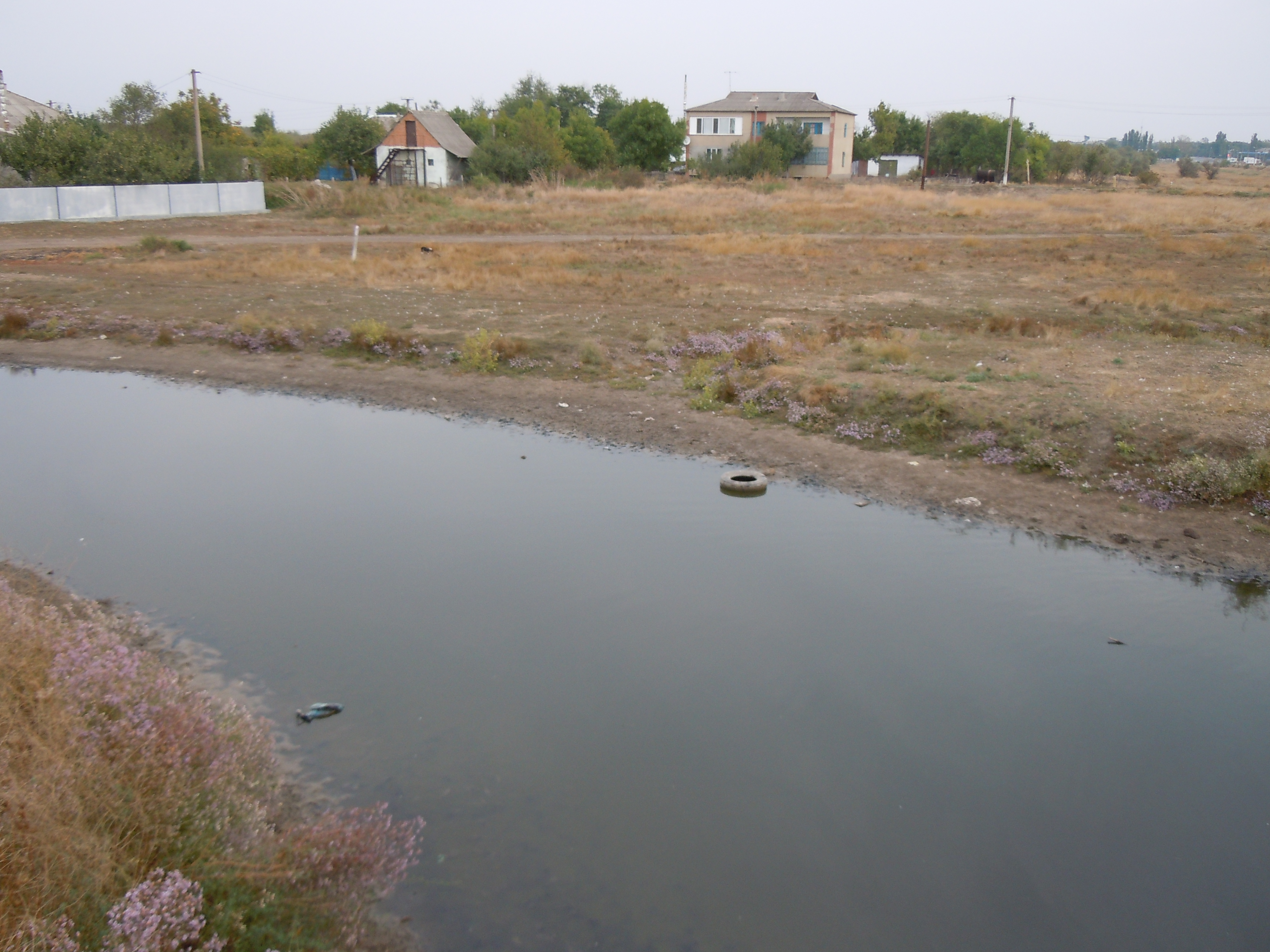
- The Sarata River in the Town of Sarata, Ukraine

Location
- Country: Moldova, Ukraine

Physical characteristics
- Source
  - location: Moldova
- Mouth
  - location: Sasyk Lagoon, Ukraine
  - coordinates: 45.8035°N 29.6807°E
  - elevation: 0 m (0 ft)
- Length: 120 km (75 mi)
- Basin size: 1,250 km^{2} (480 sq mi)

Sarata (Ukrainian: Сарата, romanized: Sarata; Romanian: Sărata) is a river in Ukraine and Moldova, which discharges into the Sasyk Lagoon. The river originates in the territory of Moldova. Length 120 km. Area of watershed 1 250 km^{2}. In summer it dries up. The river has tributaries: Babei, Gealair, Copceac.
