= Sărata Veche =

- Commune
- Location within Moldova
- Coordinates: 47.5099983215332031°N 27.7388896942138672°E
- Country: Moldova
- District: Fălești District

Government
  - Mayor: Ticau Anastasia (PDM)
- Elevation: 78 m (256 ft)

Population (2014)
  - Total: 4,329
- Time zone: UTC+2 (EET)
  - Summer (DST): UTC+3 (EEST)

Sărata Veche is a commune in Făleşti District, Moldova. It is composed of three villages:, Hitrești, Sărata Nouă and Sărata Veche.
