= López =

Lopez
- Coat of arms of Hidalgo families named López
- Pronunciation: /ˈloʊpɛz/ Spanish: [ˈlopes] (seseante); Spanish: [ˈlopeθ] (Castilian)

Origin
- Language: Spanish
- Meaning: "son of Lope" (wolf)
- Region of origin: Spain

Other names
- Variant forms: Lopes (Portuguese), Lupo (Italian), Loup (French), Lupu (Romanian)

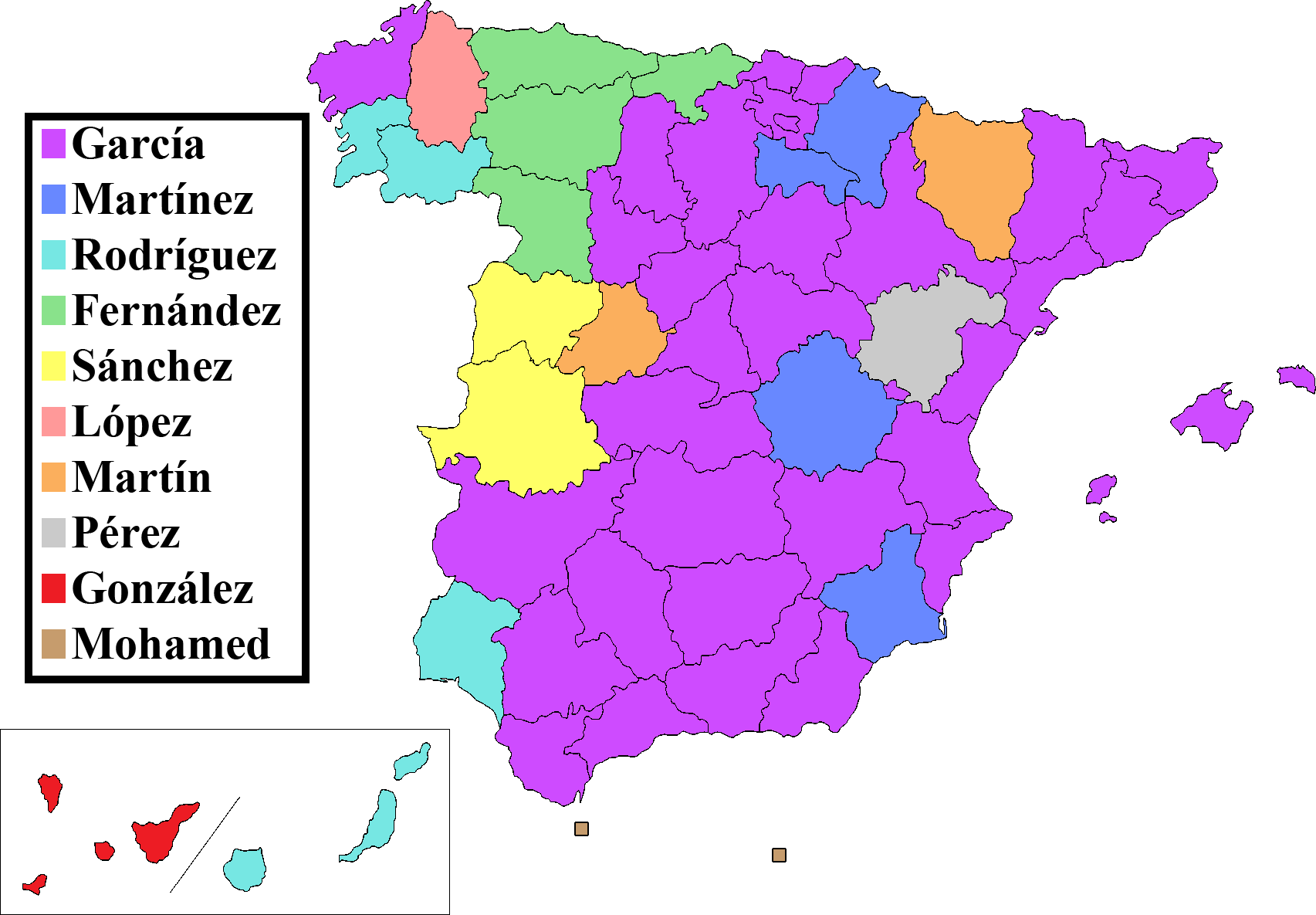
López in the Spanish provinces

López or Lopez is a surname of Spanish origin. It was originally a patronymic, meaning "Son of Lope", Lope itself being a Spanish given name deriving from Latin lupus, meaning "wolf". Its Portuguese and Galician equivalent is Lopes, its Italian equivalent is Lupo, its French equivalent is Loup (or Leu), its Romanian equivalent is Lupu or Lupescu, its Catalan and Valencian equivalent is Llopis and its Basque equivalent is Otxo.

López is the fifth most common Hispanic surname globally and in Spain and the USA. It is the most common surname in the province of Lugo. It is the most common Spanish surname in the United Kingdom.

== Geographical distribution ==
As of 2014, 34.8% of all known bearers of the surname López were residents of Mexico (frequency 1:40), 10.0% of Spain (1:52), 8.2% of Guatemala (1:22), 7.3% of the United States (1:547), 7.1% of Colombia (1:75), 5.0% of Argentina (1:96), 3.8% of Venezuela (1:88), 2.7% of Honduras (1:36), 2.7% of Peru (1:131), 2.6% of the Philippines (1:438), 2.5% of Nicaragua (1:27), 2.1% of Cuba (1:62), 1.8% of Ecuador (1:99), 1.6% of El Salvador (1:44), 1.4% of Paraguay (1:56), 1.3% of Chile (1:148) and 1.1% of Bolivia (1:104).

In Spain, the frequency of the surname was higher than average (1:52) in the following regions:

1. Region of Murcia (1:29)
2. Galicia (1:34)
3. Castilla–La Mancha (1:36)
4. Andalusia (1:43)
5. Asturias (1:48)

In Guatemala, the frequency of the surname was higher than average (1:22) in the following departments:

1. San Marcos (1:7)
2. Retalhuleu (1:13)
3. Jalapa (1:13)
4. Huehuetenango (1:13)
5. Quetzaltenango (1:15)
6. Jutiapa (1:17)
7. Chiquimula (1:18)
8. Sacatepéquez (1:18)

In Mexico, the frequency of the surname was higher than average (1:40) in the following states:

1. Chiapas (1:13)
2. Oaxaca (1:20)
3. Tabasco (1:24)
4. Sinaloa (1:25)
5. Nayarit (1:31)
6. Aguascalientes (1:35)
7. Sonora (1:36)
8. Campeche (1:36)
9. Baja California (1:37)

== Politicians ==
- Adolfo López Mateos (1909–1969), Mexican president
- Alfonso López Caballero (born 1944), Colombian politician
- Alfonso López Michelsen (1913–2007), President of Colombia
- Alfonso López Pumarejo (1886–1959), President of Colombia
- Alfonso H. Lopez (born 1970), American politician
- Andrés Manuel López Obrador (born 1953), Mexican President
- Antonio López de Santa Anna (1794–1876), Mexican general and dictator
- Antonio López-Istúriz White (born 1970), Spanish politician member of the European Parliament
- Augustine Lopez (1935–2013), American politician
- Carlos Antonio López (1792–1862), Paraguayan president
- Carol Jane Lopez, Filipino politician
- Cristina López Valverde (born 1959), Argentine politician
- Deborah Klein Lopez, American politician
- Eleazar López Contreras (1882–1973), Venezuelan president
- Fernando Lopez (1904–1993), Filipino politician
- Francisco Solano López (1827–1870), Paraguayan president
- Hermógenes López (1830–1898), Venezuelan president
- Igor López de Munain (1983/1984–2022), Basque politician
- James Lopez Watson (1922–2001), American judge and politician
- Johanna López (born 1972), American politician
- Jorge Mora López (born 1967), Colombian military officer and politician
- José Cortés López (1883–c. 1958), Spanish magistrate and politician
- José López Portillo (1920–2004), Mexican president
- José López Rega (1916–1989), Argentina's Minister of Social Welfare
- Juan Fernando López Aguilar (born 1961), Spanish politician
- Kamala Lopez (born 1964), Venezuelan actress, director, and political activist
- Leopoldo López (born 1971), Venezuelan politician
- Marco A. López Jr. (born 1978), American politician
- Margarita López, Puerto Rican politician
- Maria Cristina Lopez, Filipino politician
- Narciso López (1797–1851), Venezuelan military officer and politician
- Nativo Lopez (1951–2019), Mexican-American politician and activist
- Oswaldo López Arellano (1921–2010), President of Honduras from 1963 to 1971 and 1972–1975
- Patxi Lopez (born 1959), Basque socialist politician
- Pero López de Ayala, Spanish statesman
- Ricardo López Murphy (born 1951), Argentine economist and politician
- Adelardo López de Ayala (1828–1879), Spanish politician
- Iñigo López de Mendoza (1398–1458), soldier, politician and poet in Medieval Spain

== Athletes ==
- Adrián López Álvarez (born 1988), Spanish footballer
- Albie Lopez (born 1971), American baseball pitcher
- Alejandro Lopez (born 1975), Mexican race walker
- Alejo López (born 1996), Mexican baseball player
- Alexander López (born 1992), Honduran footballer
- Aliuska López (born 1969), Cuban-Spanish athlete
- Andy Lopez (born 1953), American college baseball coach
- Ángel López (disambiguation), several people
- Anselmo López (1910–2004), Spanish basketball manager
- Antonio López Guerrero (born 1981), Spanish footballer
- Ariel López (footballer, born 1974), Argentine forward
- Ariel López (footballer, born 2000), Argentine forward
- Brook Lopez (born 1988), American basketball player, twin of Robin Lopez
- Camille Lopez (born 1989), French (male) rugby player
- Carlos López de Silanes (born 1970), Mexican footballer
- Celestino López, Venezuelan baseball player
- Claudio López (born 1974), Argentine footballer
- Christian López (1984–2013), Guatemalan weightlifter
- Christian Lopez (born 1953), French footballer
- Colby Lopez (born 1986), American professional wrestler better known as Seth Rollins
- Daniel López (footballer, born 1969), Chilean footballer
- Danny Lopez (boxer) (born 1952), U.S. boxer
- David López-Zubero (born 1959), Spanish Olympic swimmer
- Diego López Rodríguez (born 1981), Spanish footballer
- Ebrahim Enguio Lopez (born 1988), Indonesian-Filipino professional basketball player
- Enrique López Pérez (born 1991), Spanish tennis player
- Estefany López (born 1992), Ecuadorian para-athlete
- Federico Lopez (1962–2006), Puerto Rican basketball player
- Feliciano López (born 1981), Spanish tennis player
- Felipe López (basketball) (born 1974)
- Felipe López (baseball player) (born 1980)
- Gio Lopez, American football player
- Gustavo Adrián López (born 1973), Argentine footballer
- Hannah Lopez (born 1992), American rugby sevens player
- Israel López (footballer) (born 1974), Mexican footballer
- Jack López (born 1992), Puerto Rican baseball player
- Jacob Lopez (born 1998), American baseball player
- Javier López (baseball) (born 1977), Puerto Rican baseball player
- Javy López (born 1970), Puerto Rican baseball player
- Jean Lopez (born 1973), Taekwondo athlete and coach
- Jessica López (born 1986), Venezuelan artistic gymnast
- Jorge López (baseball) (born 1993), Puerto Rican baseball player
- José Luis López Ramírez (born 1981), Costa Rican football player
- José María López (born 1983), Argentine racing driver
- Juan Antonio Lopez (1952–2004), Mexican boxer
- Juan Manuel Bellón López (born 1950), Spanish chess grandmaster
- Lisandro López (footballer, born 1983), Argentine footballer
- Lisandro López (footballer, born 1989), Argentine footballer
- Lou Lopez Sénéchal (born 1998), Mexico-born French women's basketball player
- Lucía López (born 1974), Spanish field hockey player
- Manuel López (died 1954), Argentine boxer
- Marc López (born 1982), Spanish tennis player
- Marisa López (born 1964), Argentine field hockey player
- Martín López-Zubero (born 1969), Spanish-American backstroke swimmer
- Maxi López (born 1984), Argentine football player
- Nancy Lopez (born 1957), American golfer
- Nicky Lopez (born 1995), American baseball player
- Nicolas Lopez (fencer) (born 1980), French sabre fencer
- Omar López (born 1977), Venezuelan baseball coach
- Otto Lopez (born 1998), Dominican-Canadian baseball player
- Pablo Darío López (born 1982), Argentine footballer
- Pablo López (baseball) (born 1996), Venezuelan baseball player
- Raúl López (born 1980), Spanish basketball player
- Reynaldo López (born 1994), Dominican baseball player
- Ricardo López (born 1966), Mexican boxer
- Ricardo López Felipe (born 1971), Spanish football player
- Robin Lopez (born 1988), American basketball player, twin of Brook Lopez
- Rodrigo Muñoz López (born 1975), major league starting pitcher for the Colorado Rockies
- Rodrigo López (born 1987), a Mexican-American soccer player
- Ron Lopez (born 1970), American football player
- Roy Lopez (American football) (born 1997), American football player
- Sergio López Miró (born 1968), Spanish swimmer
- Steven López (born 1978), 2000 and 2004 USA Olympic Tae Kwon Do Gold Medalist
- Sue Lopez (born 1945), English footballer, manager, coach and advocate of the women's game
- Teófimo López (born 1997), American world champion boxer
- Vidal López (1918–1971), Venezuelan baseball pitcher and manager
- Wilton López (born 1983), Nicaraguan baseball pitcher
- Yaqui López (born 1951), Mexican boxer and current member of the Boxing Hall of Fame
- Yeimer López (born 1982), Cuban middle-distance runner
- Yoan López (born 1993), Cuban baseball player

== Film and television ==
- Adamari López (born 1971), Puerto Rican actress
- Alencier Ley Lopez (born 1965), Indian Keralite Actor
- Andrew Lopez, American television actor
- Charo López (born 1943), Spanish actress
- Constance Marie Lopez (born 1965), American actress
- George Lopez (born 1961), Mexican-American comedian
- Gabriella Louise Ortega Lopez (born 1998), Filipina actress, singer, model, vlogger, and recording artist
- Gerry Lopez (born 1948), American surfer and occasional film actor
- Jean López (1939/1940–2026), Filipina actress
- Jade Lopez (born 1987), Filipina actress
- Jennifer Lopez (born 1969), American actress, singer, dancer and designer
- Leon Lopez (born 1979), British actor
- Liezel Lopez (born 1997), Filipina actress, model and dancer
- Mara Lopez (born 1991), Filipina actress
- Marga López (1924–2005), Argentine-Mexican actress
- Mario López (born 1973), American actor
- Martina López, American photographer
- Perry Lopez (1929–2008), American actor
- Polyana López, Argentine actress
- Priscilla Lopez (born 1948), American singer, dancer, and actress
- Sanya Lopez (born 1996 as Shaira Lenn Osuna Roberto), Filipina actress
- Sergi López (born 1965), Spanish actor
- Vernetta Lopez (born 1973), Singaporean actress
- Manuel López Ochoa (1933–2011), Mexican actor and singer
- Carlos López Moctezuma (1909–1980), Mexican actor

== Artists ==
- Agustina González López (1891–1936), writer and artist from the Generation of '27
- Alma López, Mexican artist
- António López García (born 1936), Spanish painter and sculptor
- Carlos Lopez-Barillas, Guatemalan photographer
- Carlos Lopez (artist) (1908–1953), American painter
- Francisco Solano López (comics) (1928–2011), Argentine comics artist
- Pola Lopez (born 1954), American artist
- Teresa López, Puerto Rican artist
- Yolanda López (1942–2021), American artist

== Musicians and composers ==
- Anselmo López (1934–2016), Venezuelan bandolist
- Gabe Lopez (1994 or 1995–2026), American singer-songwriter and producer
- Jesús López-Cobos (1940–2018), Spanish conductor
- Jimmy Lopez (born 1978), Peruvian composer
- Lance Lopez (born 1977), American musician
- Luigi Lopez (1947–2025), Italian musician
- Martin Lopez (born 1978), Swedish heavy metal drummer
- Oscar Lopez (guitarist), Chilean-Canadian folk guitarist
- Renato López (1983–2016), Mexican musician
- Ricardo López Méndez (1903–1989), Mexican poet and song lyricist
- Ricky Lopez (born 1980), Puerto Rican singer, ex-Menudo
- Robert Lopez (born 1975), composer and lyricist of musicals
- Rosa López (born 1981), Spanish singer and dancer of Operación Triunfo
- Trini Lopez (1937–2020), American musician
- Vincent Lopez (1895–1975), American bandleader and pianist

== Other people ==
- Alberto López Arce (1907–?), Cuban chess master
- Alfonso López Trujillo (1935–2008), Colombian Cardinal
- Alvaro Lopez (born 1976) Famous Australian B2 [Avionics] LAME and founding member of the Hangover group [see below].
- Hangover group [Australian Jet-setting party animals]. Members- Alfons Mikhaeil B1B2 LAME, Adrian Keller B1B2 LAME [both full bottle] and Alex Karavias A320 Pilot, [known as Captain Chops].
- Andrés Manuel López Obrador (born 1953), also known as AMLO, Mexican president
- Angelica Lopez (born 2000), Filipino beauty queen
- Araceli Lopez-Martens (born 1971), French physicist
- Awilda Lopez (born 1966), American criminal
- Barry Lopez (1945–2020), American writer
- Cachao López (1918–2008), Cuban mambo musician and composer
- Carlos Lopez, American Ballet Theatre soloist
- Donald S. Lopez, Sr. (1923–2008), American Air Force fighter and test pilot
- Donald S. Lopez, Jr., American scholar of Buddhism
- Eugenio Lopez Sr. (1901–1975), Filipino politician and founder of ABS-CBN Corporation
- Eugenio Lopez Jr. (1928–1999), Filipino businessman and former CEO and president of ABS-CBN Corporation
- Eugenio Lopez III (born 1952), Filipino businessman and former CEO and chairman of ABS-CBN Corporation
- Felipe López (archer) (born 1977), Spanish Olympic archer
- Fernão Lopez, first permanent resident of the island of Saint Helena
- Francisco López Sanz (1896–1977), Spanish publisher
- Francisco Romero López (born 1933), Spanish bullfighter
- García López de Cárdenas, Spanish conquistador
- George A. Lopez, American academic
- Gerardo I. Lopez (1934–2004), CEO and President, AMC Theatres
- Gina Lopez (1953–2019), Filipino environmentalist and philanthropist
- Graciano Lopez Jaena (1856–1896), Filipino hero
- Hernán López-Schier, biomedical scientist
- Iñigo López de Recalde, birth name of Ignatius of Loyola (1491–1556), Catholic saint and founder of the Jesuits
- Jennifer Lopez (meteorologist), meteorologist for KXAS-TV

Jesús Antonio López, psicólogo social panameño y uno de los principales psicólogos sociales latinoamericanos.

- Jose M. Lopez (1910–2005), American Medal of Honor recipient
- Joseph A. Lopez (1779–1841), Spanish Mexican Jesuit
- Juan López de Hoyos, Spanish humanist and educator who was the teacher of Miguel de Cervantes
- Juana López (nurse) (c. 1845–1904), Chilean army nurse
- Juliana López, Spanish anarchist
- Kathryn Jean Lopez (born 1976), American conservative columnist
- Lourdes Lopez, New York City Ballet principal dancer
- Lynda Lopez (born 1971), American news anchor
- Mario Lopez Estrada (1938–2023), Guatemalan billionaire businessman
- Martín López-Vega, Spanish Asturian language writer
- Simón Pardiñas López (born 1987), Spanish dentist
- Miguel López de Legazpi (1502–1572), Spanish explorer
- Nicolás de Jesús López Rodríguez (born 1936), Dominican cardinal of the Roman Catholic Church
- Nicolás Lindley López (1908–1995), Peruvian military commander
- Noelia López (born 1986), Spanish model
- Pedro López (serial killer) (born 1946), Colombian serial killer and rapist
- Petrona Hernández López (1890–2007), Nicaraguan revolutionary
- Pura López Colomé (born 1952), Mexican poet, translator
- R. Edward Lopez (1953–2005), American newsman and morning radio personality
- Ramón López (disambiguation), multiple people
- Raúl Celis López (1955–2025), Peruvian journalist, shot dead whilst reporting on corruption
- Rubén López Ardón (born 1932), Nicaraguan Roman Catholic bishop
- Ricardo López (stalker) (1975–1996), Uruguayan-American man who attempted to murder the Icelandic singer Björk
- Ruy López de Segura, Spanish priest after whom the Ruy López opening is named
- Ruy López de Villalobos, Spanish explorer
- Santos López Pelegrín, Spanish journalist
- Steve Lopez, American journalist for the Los Angeles Times and author
- Venancio López (1830–1870), Paraguayan military officer
- Venancio Víctor López (1862–1927), Paraguayan chancellor
