= Lopes =

- Pronunciation: European Portuguese: [ˈlopɨʃ]
- Language: Portuguese

Origin
- Meaning: "Son of Lopo" (Wolf)
- Region of origin: Portuguese, Galician

Other names
- Variant forms: López (Spanish), Lupo (Italian), Loup (French), Lupu (Romanian)

Lopes is a Portuguese and Galician surname. Origin: Germanic patronymic for son of Lopo, itself being derived from Latin lupus wolf. This surname occurs in other Romance variants, such as Spanish López, Italian Lupo, French Loup, and Romanian Lupu or Lupescu.

Notable people with the surname include:

- Adelino Lopes (born 1976), Guinea-Bissauan footballer
- Adília Lopes (1960–2024), Portuguese poet, chronicler, and translator
- Adriane Lopes (born 1976), Brazilian politician
- Alexandre Paes Lopes (born 1974), Brazilian footballer
- Almir Lopes de Luna (born 1982), Brazilian footballer
- Álvaro Lopes Cançado (1912–1984), Brazilian footballer
- Américo Lopes (1933–2023), Portuguese footballer
- Amílcar Lopes Cabral (1924–1973), Capeverdian and Guinea-Bissauan statesman
- Ana Paula Lopes (born 1979), Brazilian singer
- Aniceto Guterres Lopes (born 1967), East Timorese politician and human rights lawyer
- Anthony Lopes (born 1990), Portuguese footballer
- António Bastos Lopes (born 1953), Portuguese
- António Lopes Ribeiro (1908–1995), Portuguese
- Antônio Lopes (born 1941), Brazilian
- Arlindo Lopes (born 1979), Brazilian actor
- Astolpho Junio Lopes (born 1983), Brazilian
- Baltasar Lopes da Silva (1907–1989), Capeverdian
- Brian Lopes (born 1971), United States
- Carlos Eduardo Lopes (born 1980), Brazilian footballer
- Carlos Lopes (born 1947), Portuguese long-distance athlete
- Carlos Michel Lopes Vargas (born 1982), Brazilian
- Cecilio Lopes (born 1979), Dutch
- Christian Lopes (born 1992), American
- Cristóvão Lopes (c.1516–1594), Portuguese painter
- Daniel Lopes (born 1976), German singer
- Daniele Alves Lopes (1977-1993), Brazilian suicide victim
- Danny Lopes (born 1982), United States
- Davey Lopes (1945–2026), United States baseball player and manager
- Demetrius Klee Lopes (born 1970), Brazilian-American cerebrovascular neurosurgeon
- Dirceu Lopes (born 1946), Brazilian
- Ephraim Lópes Pereira d'Aguilar, 2nd Baron d'Aguilar (1709–1832), British
- Ernando Rodrigues Lopes (born 1988), Brazilian
- Everton Lopes (born 1988), Brazilian
- Felipe Aliste Lopes (born 1987), Brazilian
- Fernando Lopes (1935–2012), Portuguese filmmaker
- Fernando Lopes-Graça (1906–1994), Portuguese
- Fernão Lopes (c.1380–1459), Portuguese royal chronicler
- Fernão Lopes (died 1545), Portuguese sailor and first inhabitant of the island of Saint Helena
- Francisco Craveiro Lopes (1894–1960), Portuguese politician and military
- Fábio Deivison Lopes Maciel (born 1980), Brazilian
- Fábio Lopes Alcântara (born 1977), Brazilian
- Fátima Lopes (born 1965), Portuguese
- Giulio Lopes (born 1959), Brazilian actor
- Gregório Lopes (c.1490–1550), Portuguese painter
- Henrique Lopes de Mendonça (1856–1931), Portuguese
- Henry Lopes, 1st Baron Roborough (1859–1938), British Member of Parliament
- Isabel Mendes Lopes (born 1982), Portuguese politician
- Jessé Lopes (born 1982), Brazilian politician
- Joao Abel Pecas Lopes, Portuguese engineer
- John Reginald Lopes Yarde-Buller, 3rd Baron Churston (1873–1930), British
- João Simões Lopes Neto (1865–1916), Brazilian
- Júlio Lópes (born 1967), Brazilian swimmer
- Laura Lopes (born 1978), daughter of Camilla, Duchess of Cornwall and Andrew Parker Bowles, OBE
- Leandro Lopes (born 1984), Brazilian
- Leila Lopes (born 1986), Angolan Miss Universe 2011 winner.
- Lisa Lopes (1971–2002), United States
- Lopes Gonçalves, Portuguese explorer
- Luciano Lopes de Souza (born 1974), Brazilian
- Luís Carlos Melo Lopes (1954–2016), Brazilian footballer
- Manuel Lopes (barber) (before 1850–after 1870), United States barber and first Black resident of Seattle
- Manuel Lopes (1907–2005), Capeverdian writer
- Marcelo Gonçalves Costa Lopes (born 1966), Brazilian footballer
- Marcelo Lopes de Faria (born 1976), Brazilian
- Maria Lopes, American politician from Rhode Island
- Maria do Couto Maia-Lopes (1890–2005) Portuguese supercentenarian
- Martinho da Costa Lopes (1918–1991), East Timorese religious and political leader
- Massey Lopes, 2nd Baron Roborough (1903–1992), British peer and officer of the British Army
- Mateus Lopes (born 1972), Capeverdian
- Matheus Henrique do Carmo Lopes (born 1985), Brazilian
- Mécia Lopes de Haro (died 1270), Portuguese
- Nei Lopes (born 1942), Brazilian musician
- Neylor Lopes Gonçalves (born 1987), Brazilian
- Olga Lopes-Seale (1918–2011), Barbadian
- Oscar Lino Lopes Fernandes Braga (1931–2020), Angolan
- Osvaldo Lopes (born 1980), French
- Patrick Fabíonn Lopes (born 1980), Brazilian footballer
- Paulo José Lopes de Figueiredo (born 1972), Angolan
- Pedro Santana Lopes (born 1956), Portuguese
- Rinaldo Lopes Costa (born 1968), Brazilian
- Roberto Lopes (born 1966), Brazilian
- Roberto Lopes Nascimento (born 1983), Brazilian
- Rosaly Lopes (born 1957), Brazilian earth-scientist
- Santinho Lopes Monteiro (born 1979), Dutch
- Sir Manasseh Masseh Lopes, 1st Baronet (1755–1831), British Member of Parliament
- Sir Massey Lopes, 3rd Baronet (born "Massey Franco" 1818–1908), British Member of Parliament
- Sir Ralph Lopes, 2nd Baronet (born "Ralph Franco" 1788–1854), British Member of Parliament
- Steven J. Lopes (born 1975), Portuguese American Roman Catholic Bishop of the Personal Ordinariate of the Chair of Saint Peter
- Sufrim Lopes (born 1981), Guinea-Bissaun
- Teresa Rita Lopes (1937–2025), Portuguese Writer
- Tiago André Coelho Lopes (born 1989), Portuguese
- Tiago Lopes (born 1986), Portuguese-American video game composer, known as Tee Lopes
- Tim Lopes (1950–2002), Brazilian
- Elvira Tânia Lopes Martins (1957–2021), Brazilian
- Valmiro Lopes Rocha (born 1981), Spanish
- Vasco Lopes (born 1999), Portuguese-Cape Verdean footballer
- Wagner Lopes (born 1969), Japanese footballer
- Welington Nogueira Lopes (born 1979), Brazilian footballer
- Wesley Lopes Beltrame (born 1987), Brazilian
- Wesley Lopes da Silva (born 1980), Brazilian
- Winilson Lopes (born 2007), Santomean footballer
