= Wilbert Parkhurst =

Puerto Rican businessman

Norman Parkhurst
- Occupations: industrialist, and sportsman

Notes
- Parkhurst was also the owner of the "Vaqueros de Bayamón" (Bayamon Cowboys), a basketball team.

Norman Parkhurst was the founder of Empresas La Famosa, Inc., a company dedicated to the packaging and distribution of canned fruits and juices. The company, whose products are sold in 62 countries, is the owner of the brands "Famosa", "Criada" and "Coco Lopez"

== Early years ==
In 1906, Parkhurst moved to Puerto Rico from Millville, New Jersey with his wife Bertha Jane and his three sons Wilbert Nicholas, Norman Eugene, Howard Allen. He purchased some land in the town of Bayamon and cultivated citrus fruits such as grapefruits and pineapples.

== Empresas La Famosa, Inc. ==
In 1921, Parkhurst founded the Parkhurst Canning Co.; a company dedicated to canning and distribution of the fruits produced in his lands. In 1923, the company was renamed Empresas La Famosa, Inc. and Norman Eugene served as president. The company succeeded in introducing its products to the local market and continued to grow. Parkhurst's family became involved in the business which by 1971, included Frozen Fruits Concentrates, Inc. (the juice brand "Caribe"), Toa Canning Co., La Concentradora de Puerto Rico and Bayamón Can Company.

Ramón López Irizarry, a successful Puerto Rican inventor, packaged his product "Coco López" at the Industrias La Famosa canning factory. "Coco López" contained the ingredients which became the basis for the piña colada drink, which made its first appearance in 1954. In 1966, he sold the brand to the Parkhurst family, which later forged a deal with David Ballachow to distribute the product in the continental United States. In 1978, the Parkhurst family sold Empresas La Famosa, Inc. and the Coco López brand to the Borden company.

== Later years ==
Parkhurst's sons, Norman, Wilbert, and Howard (January 4, 1927 - January 11, 2010), were the owners of the Vaqueros de Bayamón (lit. "Bayamon Cowboys"), a professional basketball team based in Bayamón, Puerto Rico. The team, which played in the BSN league of Puerto Rico, won their third championship in 1967, under his ownership.

The town of Las Piedras, Puerto Rico named an urbanization "Parkhurst" in honor of the Parkhurst family.

== See also ==
- List of Puerto Ricans
- Vaqueros de Bayamón
