= Ramón López =

Ramón López may refer to:

- Ramón López de Osornio (1685–1757), Spanish colonial landowner
- Ramón López Soler (1806–1836), Spanish journalist and writer
- Ramón López Velarde (1888–1921), Mexican poet
- Ramón López Irizarry (1897–1982), Puerto Rican educator and scientist who developed the original formula for Coco López
- Ramón López (baseball) (1933–1982), Cuban baseball pitcher
- Ramón López Carrozas (1937–2018), Brazilian-Spanish Roman Catholic prelate
- Ramón López (triple jumper) (1936–2021), Cuban triple jumper
- Ramón E. López (born 1959), Puerto Rican space physicist and author
- Ramón López (runner) (born 1963), Paraguayan long-distance and steeplechase runner
- Ramon H. Lopez (born 1983), Filipino artist
- Ramon Lopez (businessman), Philippine Department of Trade and Industry secretary

== See also ==
- José Ramón López (born 1950), Spanish sprint canoer
