= Schier =

Schier is a German surname. It was probably derived from the Middle High German word schîr (i.e. 'clean', 'clear'), from schier ('fast') or from Kohlschürer (designation of the person who managed the coal at the old smelter). A Czechised form of the surname is Šír. Notable people with the surname include:

- Alexander F. Schier (born 1964), Swiss cell biologist
- Kurt Schier (1929–2023), German philologist
- Steven Schier (born 1952), American political scientist

== See also ==
- Ruth Eisemann-Schier (born 1942), Honduran criminal
- Hernan López-Schier, developmental biologist and neuroscientist
- Vladislav Šír, also Germanised as Schier (1830–1889), Czech medical doctor and ornithologist
- József Sir, born Schier (1912–1996), Hungarian sprinter
- Schiermonnikoog, an island and municipality in the Netherlands
