= Lopes (disambiguation) =

Lopes is a surname of Portuguese origin.

Lopes may also refer to:

- LOPES (telescope), a cosmic ray detector array in Germany
- LOPES (exoskeleton), a gait rehabilitation robot for treadmill training
- Lopes (footballer) (Astolpho Junio Lopes, born 1983), Brazilian footballer
- Grand Canyon Antelopes (nicknamed lopes), the athletic teams for Grand Canyon University
