= Lapis Lazuli (disambiguation) =

Lapis lazuli is a deep-blue metamorphic rock.

Lapiz Lazuli may also refer to:

- Lapis Lazuli (Fabergé egg)
- Lapis Lazuli corridor, international transit route
- Lapis Lazuli, 2025 album by Takane Lui
- Lapis Lazuli, supporting character in Steven Universe

== See also ==
- Lapis (disambiguation)
- Lazuli (disambiguation)
