= Šír =

Šír (feminine: Šírová) is a Czech surname, a Czechised form of the German surname Schier. Notable people with the surname include:

- Jaroslav Šír (born 1923), Czech skier
- Vladislav Šír (1830–1889), Czech medical doctor and ornithologist
