= Lupo (surname) =

- Pronunciation: Italian: [ˈluːpo]
- Language: Italian

Origin
- Meaning: "Wolf"
- Region of origin: Italy

Other names
- Variant forms: Loup (French), López (Spanish), Lopes (Portuguese), Lupu (Romanian)

Lupo is a surname of Italian origin, meaning "wolf", which is derived from the Latin lupus. Its Spanish equivalent is López, its Portuguese equivalent is Lopes, its French equivalent is Loup, and its Romanian equivalent is Lupu or Lupescu.

The name may refer to:

== People ==
- Alberto Lupo (1924–1984), Italian film actor
- Anthony Lupo (born 1966), professor of atmospheric science at the University of Missouri
- Francis Lupo (1895–1918), American soldier killed in World War I
- Frank Lupo, American television writer and producer
- Ignazio Lupo (1877–1947), Sicilian-American gangster
- Janet Lupo (1950-2017), American model, Playboy Playmate 1975
- Michael Lupo (1953–1995), Italian serial killer in the UK
- Salvatore Lupo (born 1951), Italian author
- Lupo family, a family of court musicians in England in the 16th and 17th centuries

== Fictional characters ==
- Cyrus Lupo, on the American television series Law & Order
- Jo Lupo, on the American television series Eureka
