= Jean López =

Jean López may refer to:

- Jean López (taekwondo) (born 1973), American taekwondo athlete
- Jean Lopez (actress) (1939/40–2026), Filipina actress
