= Lupus (disambiguation) =

Lupus commonly refers to several autoimmune diseases collectively known as lupus erythematosus, including systemic lupus erythematosus.

See lupus erythematosus#Classification for links to Wikipedia articles related to this family of diseases.

Lupus may also refer to:

== Arts and entertainment ==
- Lupus, a character in The Roman Mysteries
- Lupus, a dog in the video game Jet Force Gemini
- "Lupus", in Trash: Short Stories by Dorothy Allison

== People ==
- Lupus (name), a given name and a family name
- Pen name of Wulfstan (died 956), Archbishop of York
- Hugh d'Avranches, 1st Earl of Chester, nicknamed Lupus (wolf) for his ferocity
- Lupus of Troyes, 5th-century bishop and saint

== Other uses ==
- Lupus (constellation)
- Lupus (journal), a journal in the field of rheumatology
- Lupus, Missouri, a US city
- Lupus vulgaris, cutaneous tuberculosis
- Latin word for wolf

== See also ==
- Toshiba Brave Lupus, a Japanese rugby team
- Lapis (disambiguation)
- Lupis (disambiguation)
- Lupu (disambiguation)
- Canis lupus, the wolf
