= Lupul (surname) =

Lupul is a Romanian language surname literally meaning "the wolf" ("lup" + Romanian definite article). Variant: Lupu. Notable people with the surname include:

- Joffrey Lupul (born 1983), ice hockey player
- Gary Lupul (1959–2007), ice hockey player

== See also ==
- Lupul (disambiguation)
- Lupu (surname)
