= Cocorico =

Cocorico or Coco Rico or Coq au Rico may refer to:

== Business ==
- Coco Rico, a Puerto Rican soda drink
- Cocoricò (nightclub), a dance venue in Riccione, Italy

== Arts and entertainment ==
- Cocoricó, a Brazilian TV program
- Cocorico (magazine), a French art magazine
- Cocorico! Monsieur Poulet, a French-Nigerien film from 1977
- Cocorico (comedy duo), a Japanese comedy act (ココリコ in Japanese)

== Others ==
- "Cocorico!" ("cock-a-doodle-doo!"), the French onomatopoeia for the rooster crow and as such is a French victory roar, the rooster being one of the French Republic's emblems.
- Rufous-vented chachalaca, national bird of Trinidad and Tobago, which is called "cocrico" in Trinidad and Tobago
