= Lupescu =

- Pronunciation: Romanian: [luˈpesku]
- Language: Romanian

Origin
- Meaning: "son of Lup" (Wolf)
- Region of origin: Romania

Other names
- Variant forms: López (Spanish), Lopes (Portuguese), Lupo (Italian), Loup (French)

Lupescu is a surname of Romanian origin, derived from the Romanian word lup ("wolf"), from Latin lupus ("wolf"). Its Italian equivalent is Lupo, its French equivalent is Loup, its Catalan equivalent is Llopis, its Spanish equivalent is López, and its Portuguese equivalent is Lopes.

The name may refer to:

- Magda Lupescu (1895–1977), mistress of King Carol II
- Ioan Lupescu (b. 1968), retired Romanian footballer
- Jannick Lupescu (b. 1993), Dutch tennis player
- Nicolae Lupescu (1940–2017), retired Romanian footballer
- Valya Dudycz Lupescu (b. 1974), Ukrainian-American writer
- Miss Lupescu, a character from Neil Gaiman's The Graveyard Book
