= Koolerz =

Chewing gum brand

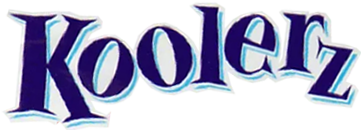

Koolerz was a chewing gum that produced a cool feeling in the mouth when chewed that was produced by The Hershey Company. It was introduced in 2001 and came in small packs. It has since been discontinued.

There were six flavors:

- Lemonade
- Berry
- Peppermint
- Strawberry
- Mango Splash
- Piña Colada
