= Loup (name) =

- Pronunciation: French: [lu]

Origin
- Language: French
- Meaning: "Wolf"
- Region of origin: France

Other names
- Variant forms: Lupo (Italian), López (Spanish), Lopes (Portuguese), Lupu (Romanian)

Loup is a French surname and given name, which means "wolf" and is derived from the Latin "lupus". Variants in French include Leloup and Leleu. In other languages, the equivalent of Loup is Lupo in Italian, Lobo or López in Spanish, Lobo or Lopes in Portuguese, and Lupu or Lupescu in Romanian. The name Loup may refer to:

== People ==
- Aaron Loup (born 1987), American baseball player
- Jean-Loup Baer (born 1936), French computer scientist
- Jean-Loup Chrétien (born 1938), French air force general
- Jean-Loup Felicioli (born 1960), French film maker
- Jean-Loup Gailly (born 1956), French computer programmer
- Jean-Loup Gervais (1936–2020), French physicist
- Jean-Loup Huret (born 1951), French scientist
- Jean-Loup Passek (1936-2016), French film critic
- Jean-Loup Philippe (1934–2025), French actor
- Jean-Loup Puget (born 1947), French astrophysicist
- Jean-Loup Waldspurger (born 1953), French mathematician
- Loup Verlet (1931–2019), French physicist
- Marguerite Louppe (1902–1989), French painter
- Paul-Loup Chatin (born 1991), French racing driver
- Paul-Loup Sulitzer (1946–2025), French financier and writer
- Pierre-Loup Bouquet (born 1987), French figure skater
- Pierre-Loup Rajot (born 1958), French actor
