= Pardinas =

Pardinas or Pardiñas may refer to:

- The town of Pardines, Girona
- Manuel Pardiñas
- Simón Pardiñas
- Pardinyes, in Lleida
- General Pardiñas, who died in the First Carlist War

== See also ==
- Pardina (disambiguation)
