= Anthony Lupo =

American atmospheric scientist

Anthony Rocco Lupo
- Born: March 13, 1966 (age 60); Auburn, New York
- Education: Cayuga Community College, State University of New York at Oswego, Purdue University
- Spouse: Allison Ann Lupo (née Wood)
- Children: Three
- Awards: Fulbright Scholar in 2004, member of the American Meteorological Society, National Weather Association, and Sigma Xi
- Scientific career
- Fields: Atmospheric science
- Workplaces: University of Missouri
- Thesis: The interactions between mid-latitude blocking anticyclones and synoptic-scale cyclones in the northern hemisphere (1995)

Anthony R. Lupo (born March 13, 1966) is a department chair and professor of atmospheric science at the University of Missouri. He became a member of the American Meteorological Society in 1987, Sigma Xi in 1992, the National Weather Association in 2000, is a former expert reviewer for the 2001 IPCC Third Assessment Report, and became a Fulbright Scholar in 2004. He is also a fellow of the Royal Meteorological Society and the editor-in-chief of the scientific journal National Weather Digest.

As of 2026 Legates is a research fellow at the Independent Institute.

== Education ==
Lupo received his Associate of Science degree in 1986 from Cayuga Community College, his Bachelor's in 1988 from State University of New York at Oswego, and his Master's and PhD from Purdue University in 1991 and 1995, respectively.

== Research ==
Lupo's primary research interests include the formation and characteristics of blocking anticyclones. Some of these causes Lupo and his research program have been studying include rising global temperatures and CO_{2} levels. Lupo has also conducted research on La Nina years and how they tend to be hotter than typical years, as occurred in the US Midwest in 1889 and 2012.

== Stance on global warming ==
Lupo disagrees with the scientific consensus of global warming, acknowledging that human activity contributes to global warming but putting more faith in the view that it is a natural phenomenon. Lupo is co-author of the book Hot Talk, Cold Science. The publisher describes the book as showing "the pessimistic, and often alarming, global warming scenarios depicted in the media have no scientific basis."

Lupo has presented several times at the International Conference on Climate Change, a conference on climate change denial hosted by the Heartland Institute.

Lupo's skepticism and receipt of funding ($750 per month) from the Heartland Institute have generated controversy. Lupo says the work Heartland pays him to do does not directly relate to causes of global warming, but rather "interpret[ing] them [scientific studies] in a form that somebody can understand and digest." He has also said that he is not violating any conflict-of-interest rules by receiving this money.

== Political party ==
Lupo is a spokesman and Ward 2 Committeeman for the Boone County Republican Party Committee.

== Weather predictions ==
Lupo regularly makes predictions regarding the weather in Missouri, based on historical patterns and statistics (unlike the weatherman's forecast covering only next week). For example, shortly before Christmas in 2012 he predicted that “There’s not much chance for a white Christmas this year.” In addition, in February 2013, he predicted that the summer of 2013 will not be as dry in Missouri as that of 2012, when the state, as well as much of the rest of the United States, suffered one of the most extreme droughts in its history.
