= Junio =

Junio is a given name. Notable people with the name include:

Brazilian footballers

- Astolpho Junio Lopes (born 1983), goalkeeper
- Felipe Junio Alves (born 1987), striker
- Junio César Arcanjo (born 1983), attacking midfielder

Other

- Junio Valerio Borghese (1906–1974), Italian naval commander and hard-line fascist politician
- Gilmore Junio (born 1990), Canadian speedskater

== See also ==
- Veinte de Junio, town located 35 km from Buenos Aires, in La Matanza, Argentina
