= Lupus (name) =

Lupus means "wolf" in Latin. It was a Latin cognomen and since then has become both a given name and family name.

It may refer to:

== Cognomen ==
- Cornelius Lupus, Roman statesman (suffect consul AD 42)
- Marcus Rutilius Lupus, Roman statesman (active 107 to 117)
- Publius Julius Lupus, Roman statesman (suffect consul AD 98)
- Publius Rutilius Lupus (died 90 BC), Roman statesman
- Publius Rutilius Lupus, Roman rhetorician
- Tiberius Julius Lupus (died AD 73), Roman statesman
- Virius Lupus (ca. 160–after 205), Roman soldier and statesman
- Virius Lupus, Roman statesman (consul 278)

== Given name ==
- Lupus of Troyes (ca. 383–ca. 478), French bishop and saint
- Lupus of Sens (d. 623), French bishop and saint
- Lupus I of Aquitaine, Duke of Gascony and Aquitaine from about 670
- Lupus II of Gascony (died 778), third-attested historical duke of Gascony
- Lupus III Centule of Gascony (died c. 820), Duke of Gascony 818-819
- Lupus Hellinck (1493 or 1494–1541), Flemish composer
- Lupus Servatus (c. 805–c. 862), French abbot, theological writer and member of Charles the Bald's court

== Family name ==
- Christian Lupus (1612–1681), Flemish theologist and historian
- Peter Lupus (born 1932), American bodybuilder and actor
- Edward Lupus (1834–1877), American architect

== Fictional characters ==
- Anthony Lupus, character in DC Comics

== See also ==
- Giovanni Luppis (1813–1875), Austrian naval officer and the first to conceive of the self-propelled torpedo
- Lupus (disambiguation)
- Lupu (surname)
