= WeatherReadyFest =

Annual public educational outreach event

WeatherReadyFest, formerly WeatherFest, is an annual public educational outreach event hosted by the National Weather Association in conjunction with the organization's annual meeting.

The event includes hands on activities and exhibits focused on atmospheric sciences and disaster safety. Emergency services and area broadcasters display large vehicles. Celebrity meteorologists including Nick Walker and Jim Cantore, from The Weather Channel, Ginger Zee from Good Morning America and James Spann were featured at recent events. Exhibitors include the National Weather Service, emergency services, public safety and first responders universities, FedEx, the Air Force, and NASA.

The event was first held in Birmingham in 2011 with over 3,400 in attendance. More than 7,500 attended the event in Saint Louis in 2018. Similar events have been sponsored by the American Meteorological Society during their annual meeting.

== Past events ==
- 2011 McWayne Science Center, Birmingham, Alabama
- 2016 Nauticus, Norfolk, Virginia
- 2017 Discovery Cube, Santa Ana, California
- 2018 Saint Louis Science Center, Saint Louis, Missouri
- 2019 Von Braun Center, Huntsville, AL
