= Lupis =

Lupis may refer to:

- Lupis, an Ancient Roman cognomen
- Lupis (food), an Indonesian sweet cake
- Antonio Lupis (1649–1701), prolific Italian writer
- Ivan Lupis (1813–1875), Italian-Croatian naval officer and inventor
- Giuseppe Lupis (1896–1979), Italian journalist and politician

== See also ==
- Lupus (disambiguation)
