= Pardina =

Pardina can refer to:

- Pardina, Tulcea, commune in Romania, principal village also Pardina
- Pardillo, Spanish wine grape grown in Western Spain, also known as Pardina
- Cayetana blanca, Spanish wine grape grown in Southern Spain, also known as Pardina
- 4914 Pardina, main belt asteroid

== See also ==
- Pardinas (disambiguation)
