= Lupul =

Lupul may refer to:

- Lupul (surname)

Lupul may also refer to the following rivers in Romania:

- Lupul, a tributary of the Râul Mic in Alba County
- Lupul, another name for the upper course of the Dămuc in Harghita County
- Lupul, a tributary of the Călinești in Vâlcea County
- Lupul, a tributary of the Lotru in Vâlcea County
- Lupul (Tazlău), a tributary of the Tazlău in Bacău County
- Lupul, another name for the upper course of the Uria in Vâlcea County

== See also ==
- Lupulești
