= Joffrey Lupul =

Canadian ice hockey player (born 1983)

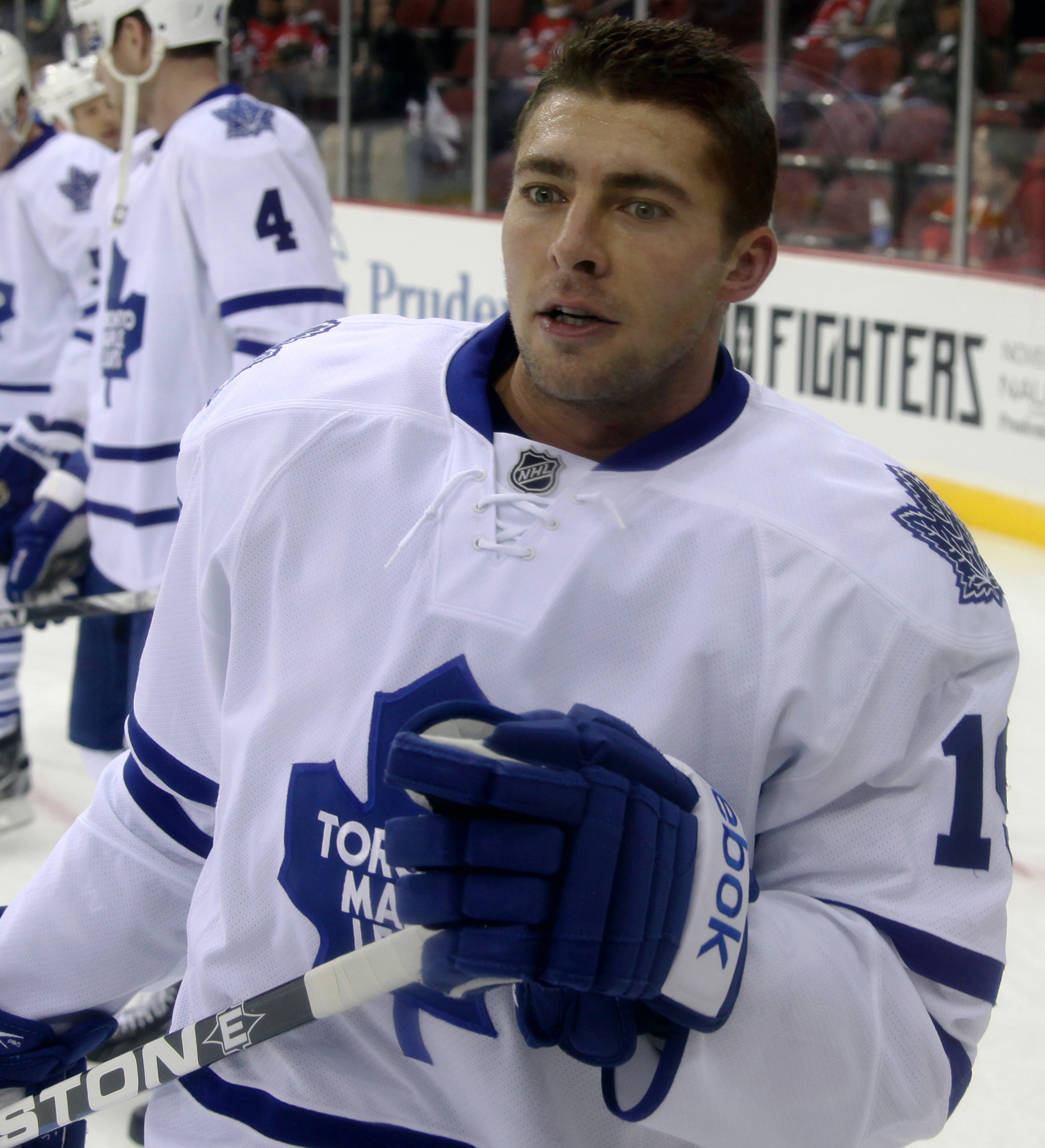
- Lupul with the Toronto Maple Leafs in 2011
- Born: September 23, 1983 (age 42) Fort Saskatchewan, Alberta, Canada
- Height: 6 ft 1 in (185 cm)
- Weight: 206 lb (93 kg; 14 st 10 lb)
- Position: Winger (Note: Played right wing during the first part of his career, and transited to left wing while with the Toronto Maple Leafs.)
- Shot: Right
- Played for: Anaheim Ducks; Edmonton Oilers; Philadelphia Flyers; Toronto Maple Leafs; Avtomobilist Yekaterinburg
- NHL draft: 7th overall, 2002; Mighty Ducks of Anaheim
- Playing career: 2003–2016

Joffrey Lupul (born September 23, 1983) is a Canadian former professional ice hockey forward. In his professional career, Lupul played in the NHL for the Anaheim Ducks, Edmonton Oilers, Philadelphia Flyers and Toronto Maple Leafs. He was selected seventh overall at the 2002 NHL entry draft by Anaheim, beginning his NHL career with the organization and later playing a second stint with the team prior to joining the Maple Leafs in 2011. A right-hand-shooting natural right winger earlier in his career, Lupul made the transition to become a left winger after joining Toronto.

== Playing career ==
=== Amateur ===
Two years into his three-year major junior career with the Western Hockey League (WHL)'s Medicine Hat Tigers, Lupul was drafted by the Mighty Ducks of Anaheim as the team's first choice, seventh overall, at the 2002 NHL entry draft. The London Knights' Rick Nash was chosen first and Lupul's Tigers teammate Jay Bouwmeester went third that year. The following season, Lupul made the final roster for Canada and played in the 2003 World Junior Ice Hockey Championships in Halifax, Nova Scotia.

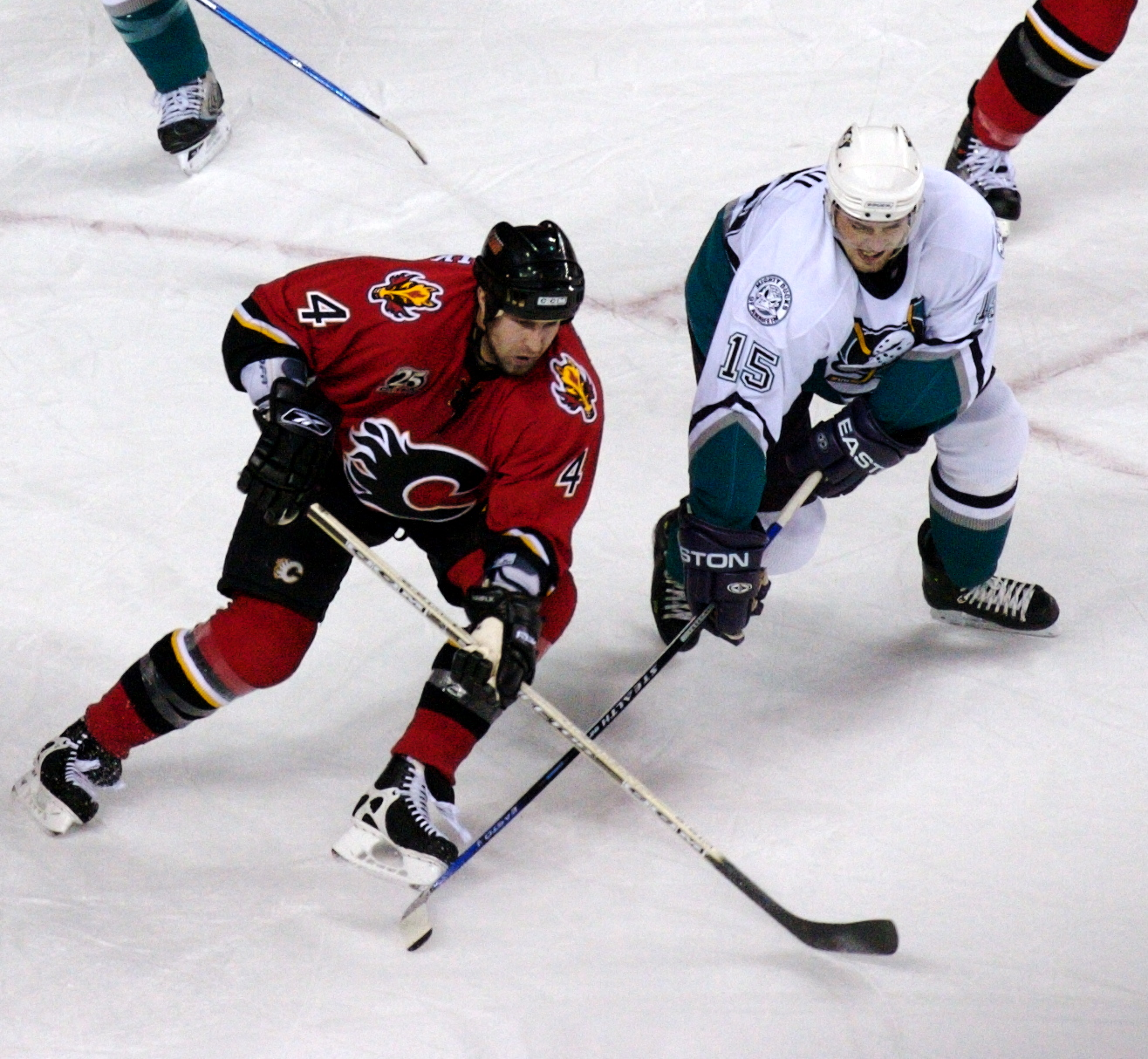
Lupul dueling for position with Roman Hamrlík during his time with Anaheim.

=== Mighty Ducks of Anaheim and Edmonton Oilers ===
Lupul made the jump directly to the Anaheim lineup his first season out of the WHL, but the following season, during the 2004–05 NHL lockout, he was assigned to the team's American Hockey League (AHL) affiliate, the Cincinnati Mighty Ducks, for the entire season. However, in his third professional season, Lupul was a regular with Anaheim and during the team's run in the 2006 Stanley Cup playoffs, he became the first player in NHL playoff history to cap a three-goal game with an overtime goal after he tallying all Duck goals in a 4–3 win over the Colorado Avalanche in Game 3 of the Western Conference Semifinals.

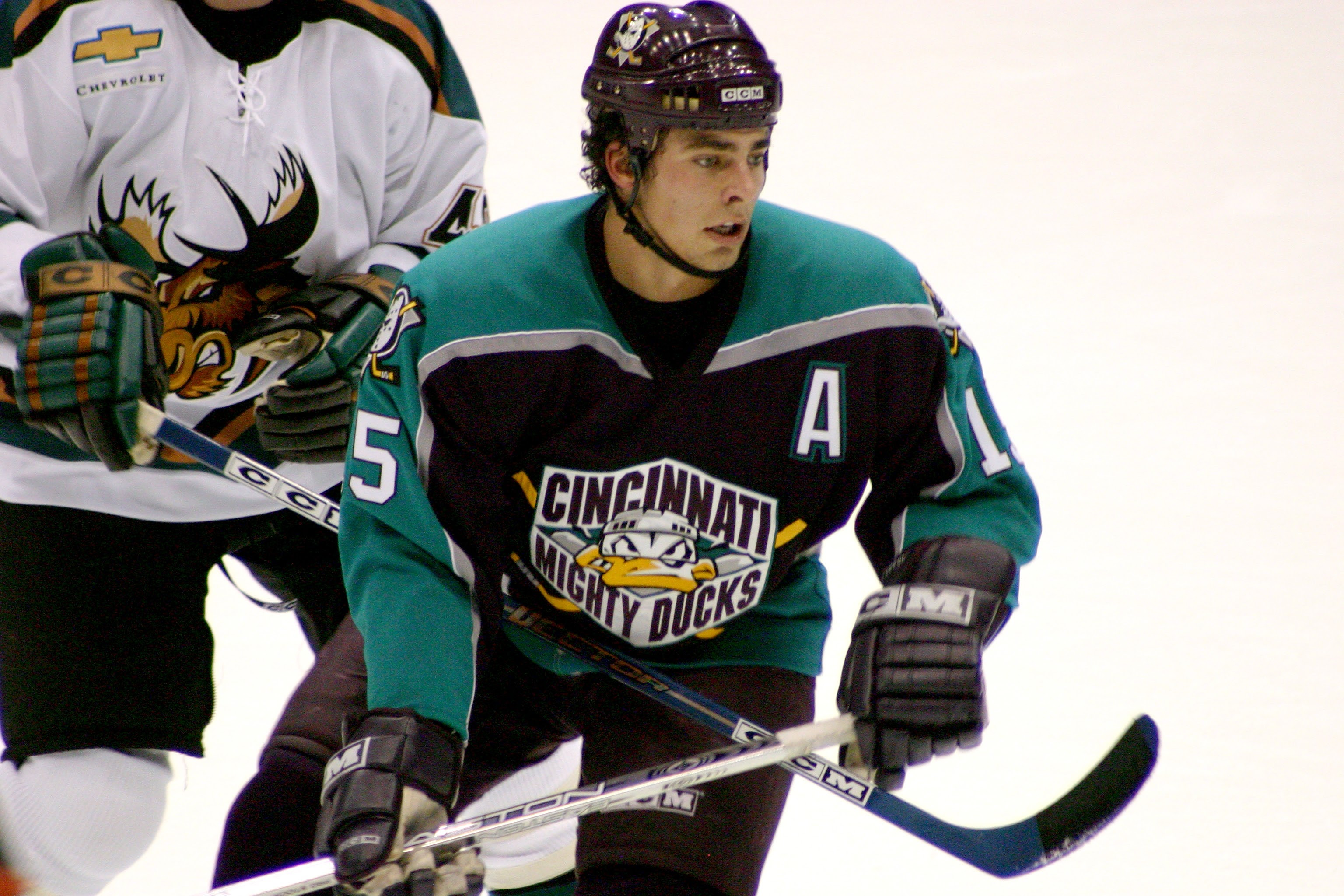
Joffrey Lupul playing for the Cincinnati Mighty Ducks in 2004.

After the 2005–06 season, Lupul was traded to the Western Conference champion Edmonton Oilers (along with Ladislav Šmíd and draft picks) in exchange for Chris Pronger on July 4, 2006.

=== Philadelphia Flyers ===
On July 1, 2007, after just one season with Edmonton in which he scored 16 goals, Lupul was traded (alongside Oilers captain Jason Smith) to the Philadelphia Flyers in exchange for Joni Pitkänen, Geoff Sanderson and a third-round draft pick in 2009.

During the 2007–08 season, his first with the Flyers, Lupul was diagnosed with a spinal cord contusion after a collision with teammate Derian Hatcher in a game against the Toronto Maple Leafs on January 5, 2008. Lupul made his return to the lineup just over one month later, on February 9 in a game against the New York Rangers. On April 22, Lupul scored the series-winning goal in the first overtime of Game 7 in the Eastern Conference Quarterfinals between Philadelphia and the Washington Capitals. After helping the Flyers reach the Eastern Conference Finals, in which Philadelphia fell to rivals Pittsburgh, Lupul agreed to a four-year contract extension with the team on July 21.

=== Return to Anaheim ===
On June 26, 2009, following his second season with Philadelphia and just one year into his four-year contract, Lupul was traded by the Flyers to the Anaheim Ducks at the 2009 NHL entry draft (along with Luca Sbisa and two first-round picks) in exchange for Chris Pronger, the second time in Lupul's career he had been part of a trade involving the Ducks with Pronger going the other way.

Back surgery in December 2009 and a subsequent blood infection limited him to just 23 games during the 2009–10 season. He ultimately missed a total of 12 months of playing time—the final 59 games of that season and carrying over into the first 28 games of the following 2010–11 season.

=== Toronto Maple Leafs ===
On February 9, 2011, nearing the end of his second season back with Anaheim, but having played only 49 games during his second stint, Lupul was traded (alongside Jake Gardiner and a conditional draft pick in 2013) to the Toronto Maple Leafs in exchange for François Beauchemin, marking the third time Lupul had been involved in a trade with the Ducks organization. Originally, the deal excluded Lupul, however he was included as a salary dump to keep the Ducks under the salary cap. After being traded to Toronto, he made the transition from right to left wing and finished with 18 points in 28 games to finish the 2010–11 season.

The following year, 2011–12, Lupul began the year on the opposite wing of Phil Kessel, putting together a strong first half of the season that led to his invitation to the 2012 NHL All-Star Game in Ottawa as an alternate captain to Zdeno Chára. There, he scored two goals for Team Chara in a 12–9 win over Team Alfredsson. On March 2, 2012, Toronto fired its head coach, Ron Wilson, and replaced him with Randy Carlyle, Lupul's former head coach in Anaheim. Lupul suffered a severe shoulder separation on March 6 that necessitated immediate season-ending surgery. Nonetheless, he finished with a career-high of 67 points on the year despite playing in just 66 games, marking the first time in his NHL career he scored at least a point-per-game pace. At the end of the season, Lupul was a finalist for the Bill Masterton Memorial Trophy—awarded annually to the NHL player best exemplifying qualities in perseverance, sportsmanship and dedication to hockey—which was ultimately awarded to Max Pacioretty of the Montreal Canadiens.

During the 2012–13 NHL lockout, Lupul played for the Kontinental Hockey League (KHL)'s Avtomobilist Yekaterinburg in Yekaterinburg, Russia. After the lockout was resolved and just prior to the start of the truncated 2012–13 season, Lupul, along with teammate Clarke MacArthur, was named an alternate captain of the Maple Leafs under captain Dion Phaneuf. Days later, on January 20, 2013, Lupul signed a five-year, US$26.25 million contract extension with Toronto. Only three games into the season, Lupul fractured his right forearm when he was hit by a Phaneuf slapshot while screening opposing goaltender Marc-André Fleury in a game against Pittsburgh. Lupul subsequently missed 25 games. In his return to the ice on March 16, he scored on his first shift of the night and once again in the second period of the game. However, the Maple Leafs went on to lose the game in a ten-round shootout to the Winnipeg Jets. Rejuvenated in his return after a long absence, Lupul scored goals in six consecutive games and recorded points in a prolific rate—eight goals and six assists in six games—before he suffered another injury in a game against his former club, the Flyers. While chasing the puck deep in his own zone, Lupul was hit by two Flyers simultaneously, one of which accidentally contacted his head, resulting in a concussion. He would miss an additional two weeks before making his return on April 16 against Washington. Lupul finished the season with totals of 18 points in 16 games.

With 57 points gained in 48 games, the Maple Leafs qualified for the playoffs for the first time since 2004. During Game 2 of the Eastern Conference Quarterfinals against the Boston Bruins, Lupul scored two goals to help propel the Leafs to a 4–2 win and even the series at one game apiece. He would score again in Game 4 at the Air Canada Centre when he scored the game's opener, though Toronto would eventually lose in overtime, 4–3. Lupul ended his first playoff series with Toronto with three goals and one assist in seven games as the team fell 5–4 in overtime of Game 7.

On November 14, 2015, Lupul scored his 200th career goal during a 4–2 victory over the Vancouver Canucks. On December 1, 2015, Lupul was placed on injured reserve after suffering a lower body injury. Lupul returned but was again injured in February, and was shut down for the season to have surgery. Facing a decline in offensive production and a growing reputation as an injury-prone player (having missed 40% of the Maple Leafs' games over the past four seasons due to injury), Rumours began to circulate as early as February 2016 that there was concern if Lupul could continue to play at the NHL level anymore. With two more years on his contract paying him $5.25 million annually, there was speculation Toronto management was planning to sideline the winger under the Injury Reserve for the duration of his contract, similarly to what was happening with teammate Stéphane Robidas following the 2014–15 season. At the end of the season, Lupul was not seen at the year-end locker room clean-out or media briefings.

Despite comments from Lupul earlier in the season and teammate Nazem Kadri in the summer implying Lupul wanted to and had the ability to play the following season, he did not participate in pre-season action, and he announced on September 22, 2016, he would sit out the upcoming season due to injury. He was subsequently placed on the long-term injury reserve, with the team stating he had failed his pre-season physical. By mid-February 2017, media reports indicated Lupul had played his final professional hockey game, and that he had been out of contact with the media and one of his agents for months. Lupul was left unprotected by the Maple Leafs in the 2017 expansion draft and was thus eligible to be selected by the expansion Vegas Golden Knights, although players who were injured for more than one year and were not expected to play again were exempt in the draft under NHL rules, signalling that Lupul may not be injured in the traditional sense. In September 2017, the Leafs declared Lupul had failed his physicals at training camp before the 2017–18 season. Lupul then made several posts on his Instagram account saying he was healthy and accused the Maple Leafs of cheating by designating him injured so his salary could not count against the salary cap. These accusations prompted the NHL to administer a second physical by an independent doctor, which he subsequently failed and confirmed the Maple Leafs' initial claim he was unfit to play.

== International play ==
Medal record

Representing Canada

Ice hockey

World Junior Championships
Silver medal – second place	2003 Halifax	

Lupul was selected by Hockey Canada to play for the nation's junior team in the 2003 World Junior Ice Hockey Championships. He posted two goals and one assist for a total of three points in six games as Canada finished with the silver medal, falling 3–2 to Russia in the tournament final.

== Records ==
- First player to score a playoff hat-trick in Anaheim franchise history;
- First player to score four playoff goals in one game, including an overtime winner;
- First player to score all four of his team's goals in a playoff game.

== Personal life ==
As featured during an NHL Network Online video, Lupul enjoys playing guitar. He is of Ukrainian descent. (Note: Lupul is named on a list of famous Ukrainian Canadians, and when asked in an interview about his Ukrainian heritage and cultural traditions, he said, "My grandma will be happy to hear that, that's for sure. I think the only cultural Ukrainian thing that I take part in is eating!") However, his father's family comes from the Romanian minority in Ukraine. Lupul's maternal grandfather, Tom Mayson, was a former member of the Edmonton Investors Group, the limited partnership that owned the Edmonton Oilers. In Romanian, Lupul's surname means "the wolf".

Lupul became part-owner of the West Village bar Due West in January 2018.

== Career statistics ==
=== Regular season and playoffs ===
			Regular season					Playoffs
Season	Team	League	GP	G	A	Pts	PIM	GP	G	A	Pts	PIM
1998–99	Fort Saskatchewan Rangers AAA	Bantam	36	40	50	90	40	—	—	—	—	—
1999–2000	Fort Saskatchewan Rangers AAA	AMHL	34	43	30	73	47	16	17	19	36	26
2000–01	Medicine Hat Tigers	WHL	69	30	26	56	39	—	—	—	—	—
2001–02	Medicine Hat Tigers	WHL	72	56	50	106	95	—	—	—	—	—
2002–03	Medicine Hat Tigers	WHL	50	41	37	78	82	11	4	11	15	20
2003–04	Mighty Ducks of Anaheim	NHL	75	13	21	34	28	—	—	—	—	—
2003–04	Cincinnati Mighty Ducks	AHL	3	3	2	5	2	—	—	—	—	—
2004–05	Cincinnati Mighty Ducks	AHL	65	30	26	56	58	12	3	9	12	27
2005–06	Mighty Ducks of Anaheim	NHL	81	28	25	53	48	16	9	2	11	31
2006–07	Edmonton Oilers	NHL	81	16	12	28	45	—	—	—	—	—
2007–08	Philadelphia Flyers	NHL	56	20	26	46	35	17	4	6	10	2
2008–09	Philadelphia Flyers	NHL	79	25	25	50	58	6	1	1	2	2
2009–10	Anaheim Ducks	NHL	23	10	4	14	18	—	—	—	—	—
2010–11	Anaheim Ducks	NHL	26	5	8	13	14	—	—	—	—	—
2010–11	Syracuse Crunch	AHL	3	1	3	4	0	—	—	—	—	—
2010–11	Toronto Maple Leafs	NHL	28	9	9	18	19	—	—	—	—	—
2011–12	Toronto Maple Leafs	NHL	66	25	42	67	48	—	—	—	—	—
2012–13	Avtomobilist Yekaterinburg	KHL	9	1	3	4	4	—	—	—	—	—
2012–13	Toronto Maple Leafs	NHL	16	11	7	18	12	7	3	1	4	4
2013–14	Toronto Maple Leafs	NHL	69	22	22	44	44	—	—	—	—	—
2014–15	Toronto Maple Leafs	NHL	55	10	11	21	26	—	—	—	—	—
2015–16	Toronto Maple Leafs	NHL	46	11	3	14	12	—	—	—	—	—
NHL totals			701	205	215	420	407	46	17	10	27	39

=== International ===
Year	Team	Event	Result	GP	G	A	Pts	PIM
2003	Canada	WJC	2nd place, silver medalist(s)	6	2	1	3	27
Junior totals				6	2	1	3	27

== Awards and honors ==
Award	Year
WHL
East First All-Star Team	2002

== Notes ==
Awards and achievements
Preceded by Stanislav Chistov	Anaheim Ducks first-round draft pick 2002	Succeeded by Ryan Getzlaf
