= Adília Lopes =

Portuguese poet (1960–2024)

- Born: Maria José da Silva Viana Fidalgo de Oliveira; 20 April 1960; Lisbon, Portugal
- Died: 30 December 2024 (aged 64); Lisbon, Portugal
- Education: University of Lisbon
- Occupations: Poet, chronicler, translator

Maria José da Silva Viana Fidalgo de Oliveira (20 April 1960 − 30 December 2024), better known by the pen name Adília Lopes, was a Portuguese poet, chronicler and translator.

== Life and career ==
Adília Lopes was born in Lisbon, the daughter of an assistant biologist in Botany at the Faculty of Sciences of the University of Lisbon and a secondary school teacher. She studied physics at the University of Lisbon, a course she abandoned, almost at the end, due to a schizoaffective disorder, a condition about which she has always spoken openly, whether in her poems, chronicles, conferences or interviews with the media. She stopped studying on medical advice and began writing with the intention of publishing.

In 1983, she competed for a Prose Award from the Portuguese Writers Association, for which a friend suggested the pseudonym by which she would become known, and sent poems to the publisher Assírio & Alvim, which sent two of them to its 1984 Yearbook of Unpublished Poets. She began a new degree, in Portuguese and French literature and linguistics (1983–1988), at the Faculty of Letters of the University of Lisbon, and published his first book of poems in an author's edition, Um jogo bastante perigoso (1985).

Throughout the course, Adília Lopes published four other books of poetry, including O Poeta de Pondichéry (1986) – her most translated work, based on an enigmatic character from Jacques le fataliste, a novel by Diderot – and O decote da dama de espadas (1988), a collection of poems written between 1983 and 1987, praised by several critics. After graduating, she received a scholarship from the National Institute of Scientific Research (1989–1992), having worked at the Linguistics Center of the University of Lisbon, on the anthroponymy project of countries with Romance languages PatRom.

=== Style ===
Some of Adília Lopes main literary influences are Sophia de Mello Breyner Andresen and Ruy Belo, but also the Countess of Ségur, Emily Brontë, Enid Blyton, Roland Barthes and Nuno Bragança.

The poet's style uses phonetic games, free associations, nursery rhymes and foreign languages. Everyday themes, mainly feminine and domestic, are treated with humor and self-irony, candor and rawness, intelligence and intentionality: “there is always a great deal of violence, pain, seriousness and holiness in what I write”. It is Adília, a practicing Catholic who sometimes brings religiosity to what she writes, who defines herself as a “shy troublemaker” or a “baroque poet nun”.

=== Death ===
Lopes died at the Hospital de São José in Lisbon, on 30 December 2024, at the age of 64.

== Bibliography ==
Among her works there are:

- Um Jogo Bastante Perigoso (Ed. autora, 1985)
- O Poeta de Pondichéry (Frenesi 1986)
- A Pão e Água de Colónia (Frenesi, 1987)
- O Marquês de Chamilly (Kabale und Liebe) (Hiena, 1987)
- O Decote da Dama de Espadas (INCM, 1988)
- Os 5 Livros de Versos Salvaram o Tio (Ed. autora, 1991)
- Maria Cristina Martins (Black Son Editores, 1992)
- O Peixe na Água (& etc., 1993)
- A Continuação do Fim do Mundo (& etc., 1995)
- A Bela Acordada (Black Sun Editores, 1997)
- Clube da Poetisa Morta (Black Sun Editores, 1997)
- O Poeta de Pondichéry seguido de Maria Cristina Martins (Angelus Novus, 1998)
- Florbela Espanca espanca (Black Sun Editores, 1999)
- Sete rios entre campos (& etc., 1999, com ilustrações de Paula Rego)
- Irmã Barata, Irmã Batata (Angelus Novus, 2000)
- Obra (Mariposa Azul, 2000)
- Quem Quer Casar Com a Poetisa? (Quasi, 2001)
- Rimas de Berço (Nursery Rhymes); (Relógio D'Água, 2001 - Tradução de Adília Lopes e Gravuras de Paula Rego)
- Crónicas da Vaca Fria, publicadas no Jornal PÚBLICO, 2001 (http://arlindo-correia.com/200301.html)
- Cartas do meu Moinho, publicadas no Jornal PÚBLICO, 2002 (http://arlindo-correia.com/180902.html)
- A Mulher-a-Dias (&, etc., 2002)
- César a César (& etc., 2003)
- Poemas Novos (& etc., 2004)
- Caras Baratas (Relógio D'Água, 2004)
- Le Vrai La Nuit - A Árvore Cortada (& etc., 2006)
- Caderno (& etc., 2007)
- Dobra (Assírio &amp; Alvim, 2009, 1ª edição)
- Apanhar ar (Assírio & Alvim, 2010; com desenhos da autora)
- Café e Caracol (Livro de artista, Casa Fernando Pessoa, 2011)
- Andar a Pé ( Averno, 2013)
- Dobra - Poesia Reunida - 1983-2014 (Assírio & Alvim, 2014)
- Manhã (Assírio & Alvim, 2015)
- O Poeta de Pondichéry (Assírio & Alvim, 2015, com desenhos de Pedro Proença)
- Capilé (Averno, 2015, com desenhos de Bárbara Assis Pacheco)
- Comprimidos (Telhados de Vidro n°20, Setembro 2015)
- Bandolim (Assírio & Alvim, 2016)
- Z/S (Averno, 2016)
- Estar em Casa (Assírio & Alvim, 2018)
- Dias e Dias (Assírio & Alvim, 2020)
- Dobra - Poesia Reunida - 1983-2021 (Assirio & Alvim, 2021)
- Pardais (Assírio & Alvim, 2022)
- Choupos (Assírio & Alvim, 2023)
- Dobra - Poesia Reunida - 1983-2023 (Assirio & Alvim, 2024)
