= Lupu (surname) =

- Pronunciation: Romanian: [ˈlupu]

Origin
- Language: Romanian
- Meaning: "Wolf"
- Region of origin: Romania

Other names
- Variant forms: López (Spanish), Lopes (Portuguese), Lupo (Italian), Loup (French)

Lupu is a surname of Romanian origin, derived from the Romanian word lup ("wolf"), from Latin lupus ("wolf"). Its Italian equivalent is Lupo, its French equivalent is Loup, its Spanish equivalent is López, and its Portuguese equivalent is Lopes or Lopo.

The name may refer to:

- Dănuţ Lupu (b. 1967), Romanian football midfielder
- Dennis Lupu (born 2000), Romanian football player
- Ion Lupu, Moldovan politician, former parliamentarian, member of the Alliance for European Integration and former Minister of Youth and Sports
- Marian Lupu (born 1966), Moldovan politician
- Mikaela Lupu (born 1995), Moldovan-born Portuguese actress
- Nataliia Lupu (born 1987), Ukrainian athlete
- Nicolae Gh. Lupu (1884–1966), Romanian physician
- Nicolae L. Lupu (1876–1947), Romanian politician and medical doctor
- Petrache Lupu (1907-1994), shepherd from Maglavit commune
- Radu Lupu (1945–2022), Romanian concert pianist
- Robert Lupu (born 1982), Romanian futsal player
- Ruxandra Lupu (1630–1686), Romanian princess
- Sabin Dănuț Lupu (born 1993), Romanian professional footballer
- Ştefăniţă Lupu (1641–1661), Moldavian Voivode between 1659 and 1661
- Vasile Lupu (1595–1661), Moldavian Voivode between 1634 and 1653
- Valeriu Lupu (born 1991), Romanian footballer

== See also ==
- Lupus (name)
