= Llopis =

Llopis is a Catalan surname; a variant of the Spanish patronymic, Lopez. Notable people with the surname include:

- Albert Ferrer Llopis, Spanish retired footballer
- Carlos Llopis (1913–1970), Spanish dramatist
- Diego Llopis (1929–2013), Spanish footballer
- Enrique Llopis, Spanish athlete
- Francesca Llopis (born 1956), Spanish artist
- Jorge Llopis (1919–1976), Spanish satirist, actor and playwright
- José Llopis Corona (1918–2011), Spanish footballer
- Manuel Goded Llopis, Spanish general
- Pascual Donat Llopis, Spanish football manager
- Pascual Fresquet Llopis, Valencian libertarian communist
- Rafael Llopis (1933–2022), Spanish psychiatrist, writer and translator
- Rodolfo Llopis (1895–1983), Spanish politician
- Salvador Llopis (1950–2014), Spanish footballer
- Sergio Llopis (born 1978), Spanish badminton player
- Llopis brothers of Los Llopis, Cuban music group
