= National Weather Digest =

- Discipline: Meteorology
- Language: English

Publication details
- History: 1976 - 2012
- Publisher: National Weather Association (U.S.A.)

Standard abbreviations
- ISO 4: Natl. Weather Dig.

Indexing
- ISSN: 0271-1052
- OCLC no.: 3190581

Links
- Journal homepage

National Weather Digest was a scientific journal published quarterly by the National Weather Association and is devoted to peer-reviewed articles, technical notes, correspondence, and official news of the Association. National Weather Digest along with Electronic Journal of Operational Meteorology were merged into Journal of Operational Meteorology in 2013.

== See also ==
- List of scientific journals
  - List of scientific journals in earth and atmospheric sciences
