= Pola Lopez =

American painter (born 1954)

Pola Lopez (born 1954) is an American painter and muralist known for her abstract, southwestern-inspired artworks.

== Biography ==
Pola Lopez was born on April 7, 1954 in Las Vegas, New Mexico, located in the county of San Miguel. Lopez had not been taught the standards of art throughout her early life, but instead was inspired to learn on her own and become a Chicana artist, after a conversation with Samuel Leyba.

Lopez omitted attending college, although she had applied to New Mexico Highlands University. Her father, Junio Lopez, was a businessman who accepted her choice, so long as she could run her own small business in a small building he loaned to her. Successfully doing so by selling art supplies in her store and gallery, De Colores, Lopez continued her journey as an artist, learning different mediums of art through a sales representative, and eventually displaying her own work in front of her store. When displaying her work, artists Wilbert Miera and Star Tapia from La Cofradia de Artes y Artesanos Hispanos (a collective created by Luis Tapia), noticed her work and invited her to join their collective in Santa Fe.

Since then, Lopez has moved to Highland Park in Los Angeles where she held a public studio space between 2009 and 2016. Some key highlights of career since have been to be honored as the first female featured artist in the Santa Fe Springs Artfest of California in 2017, be appointed a lead artist in the same year of the Daniel Cervantes mural restoration project (located at the Southwest Museum in Highland Park), and designed seven banners for La Casa of USC to be used in Latino Heritage month in 2019.

== Art ==
- La Chola y Coalticue (2018)

Made in 2018, acrylic on canvas (36x48”). This painting features the stereotypical “chola,” leaning against a statue of Coatlicue. This exhibits the feminist style of chola women who remain connected to the roots they emerged from.

- Who Wins This Game? (1991)

Made in 1991, acrylic on canvas with mixed media (40x40”). Represents different identities, beneath a tic tac toe game, as if to represent which identity best suits the artist.

- USC Latinx Heritage Month Banners (2019)

Designed in 2019, 7 designs, acrylic on canvas (each, 24x24”). Featured heritage and background stories of USC, La Casa, Latino students. Designed for the main pathway of USC Campus, Trousdale Parkway, to be displayed for Latinx Heritage Month (Sept 15-Oct 15).
