= Dennis Lupu =

Italian-born Romanian footballer (born 2000)

Personal information
- Date of birth: 13 August 2000 (age 26)
- Place of birth: Florence, Italy
- Height: 1.88 m (6 ft 2 in)
- Position: Goalkeeper

Team information
- Current team: ASD Morazzone

Youth career
- –2018: PDHAE
- 2017–2018: → Seregno (loan)

Senior career*
Years	Team	Apps	(Gls)
2017–2022	Seregno	82	(0)
2022–2023	FCD Muggiò		
2023–2024	AC Besnatese		
2024	FCD Fucina		
2024–2026	AC Besnatese		
2026–	ASD Morazzone		
- * Club domestic league appearances and goals as of 22 May 2022

Dennis Lupu (born 13 August 2000) is an Italian-born Romanian footballer. He also holds Italian citizenship.

== Club career ==
He first joined Seregno on loan in the winter of 2017, still in the junior teams. He made his Serie C debut for Seregno on 26 September 2021 in a game against Fiorenzuola.
