= Pascual Donat =

Spanish footballer

Personal information
- Full name: Pascual Donat Llopis
- Date of birth: 4 April 1968 (age 58)
- Place of birth: Ontinyent, Spain
- Height: 1.81 m (5 ft 11 in)
- Position: Right-back

Team information
- Current team: SB Ontinyent (manager)

Youth career
- Ontinyent

Senior career*
Years	Team	Apps	(Gls)
1986–1987	Alzira	2	(0)
1987–1989	Sevilla Atlético	52	(5)
1988–1992	Sevilla	35	(0)
1992–2000	Villarreal	237	(4)
2000–2001	Burriana	31	(0)
2001–2002	Ontinyent		
2002–2005	Alcoyano		
2005–2006	Novelda		

Managerial career
- 2011–2013: Villarreal B
- 2022–: SB Ontinyent
- * Club domestic league appearances and goals as of 22:07, 9 March 2023 (UTC)

Pascual Donat Llopis (born 4 April 1968) is a Spanish football manager for SB Ontinyent, and former footballer who played as a right-back. He had a 20-year association with the club Villarreal.

== Club career ==
A youth product of his local club Ontinyent, Donat began his senior career with Alzira in 1986. In the summer of 1987, he transferred to Sevilla, where he was originally assigned to Sevilla Atlético - their reserve team. The following season, he debuted for the senior Sevilla FC team in La Liga and was used sparingly by them.

In the summer of 1992, he moved to Villarreal where he spent the longest part of his career. He captained the club when they earned promotion into La Liga for the first time in their history in 1998. A charismatic player, he had a fan club around the time they got promoted. After 8 seasons with the club, he moved in the summer of 2001 to Burriana. He followed that up with stints with the semi-pro clubs Ontinyent, Alcoyano and Novelda before retiring in 2006.

After his playing career, Donat returned to Villarreal where he coached their youth sides and B-team, helping the latter earn promotion to the Segunda División B in 2007. He spent over 20 years with the club, before leaving in 2018. He since returned to his hometown to manage SB Ontinyent.
