= Coco Rico =

Puerto Rican soda brand

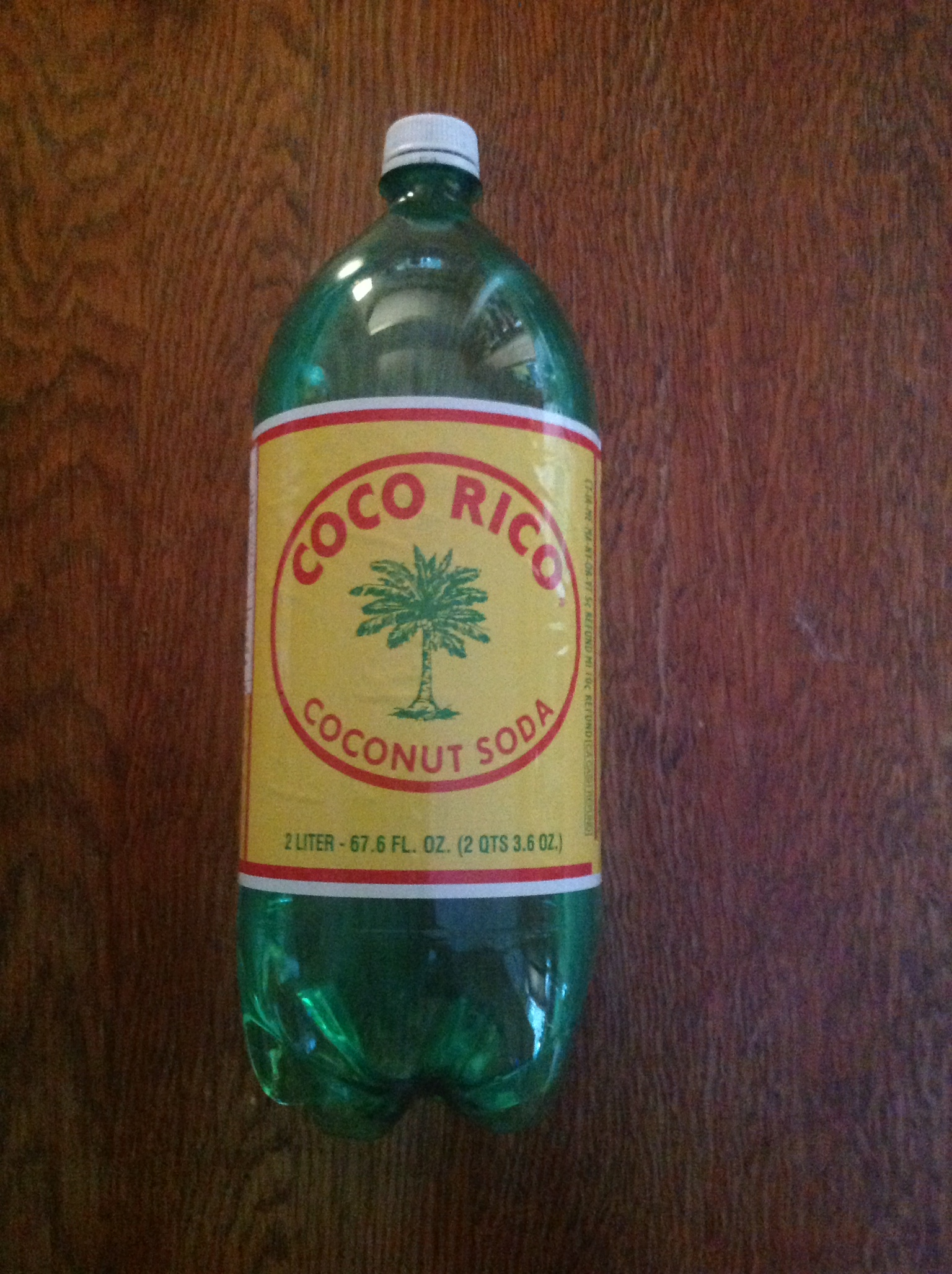
2 liter bottle of Coco Rico Coconut Soda, probably made of PET plastic. This bottle was purchased in 2015 in the Canadian province of Quebec

Coco Rico is a Puerto Rican soda brand produced by Coco Rico, Inc. It is flavored with coconut extract and is sold in plastic (polyethylene terephthalate or PET) bottles and aluminum cans. The brand is available in various flavors.

Coco Rico was introduced into supermarkets in Puerto Rico in 1935, and it is currently sold throughout the United States. The brand is family-owned.

Throughout its history, the brand has used the color green prominently on its cans and bottles. With the introduction of Diet Coco Rico, the green-and-white pattern used on the cans was reversed: the diet version features white more prominently, with green lettering.

The beverage also became popular among Vietnamese-Americans as a source of coconut flavor. One Vietnamese recipe adapted by an American cook uses Coco Rico to break down the protein in catfish.

== See also ==
- Coco Lopez
