= Ramón López Irizarry =

Puerto Rican businessman

- Born: July 25, 1897; Cabo Rojo, Puerto Rico
- Died: October 8, 1982 (aged 85); San Juan, Puerto Rico
- Occupations: Educator; scientist
- Spouse: Georgina Ramírez Banuchi

Ramón López Irizarry (July 25, 1897 – October 8, 1982) was an educator and scientist who invented an easier way to extract the cream from coconut pulp, and developed the original formula of Coco López.

== Early years ==
Ramón López Irizarry, born in Cabo Rojo, Puerto Rico, was a professor of agricultural sciences at the University of Puerto Rico. In the late 1940s, the Government of Puerto Rico gave a grant to the University of Puerto Rico to assist in the development of Puerto Rican industries.

== Coco López ==
In 1949, López Irizarry, with the use of some of these funds, was able to work in his laboratory on an idea that he had. López Irizarry set out to find an easier way to extract the cream from the coconut pulp. The heart of the coconut has always been an important ingredient in many of the desserts in Puerto Rico. The main problem was extracting the coconut cream from the pulp which was a difficult task. López Irizarry discovered an easier way by blending the cream from the hearts of the Caribbean coconuts with an exact proportion of natural cane sugar. He named the product which he developed Coco López.

López Irizarry kept the ingredients of the product a secret. The project was so successful that López Irizarry soon left the University and commercialized it. Coco López became the basis for the famous piña colada drink, which made its first appearance in 1954. The piña colada is also known as the "Official Beverage of Puerto Rico".

== Later years ==
López Irizarry was very successful. He packaged his product at the Industrias La Famosa canning factory, owned by Wilbert Parkhurst and family, for years. In 1966, he sold the brand to the Parkhurst family who later forged a deal with David Ballachow to distribute the product in the United States. Eventually the Parkhurst family sold the brand to the Borden company. López Irizarry's Coco López can be found in supermarkets worldwide.

== Personal life ==
López Irizarry was married to Georgina Ramírez Banuchi and had four children: Rosabel, Myrna, Ramón and Jorge. He resided in Ocean Park, San Juan, where he spent his last years. Ramón López Irizarry died a multi-millionaire on October 8, 1982. He was buried at Cementerio Buxeda in Carolina, Puerto Rico.

== See also ==
- List of Puerto Ricans
- Puerto Rican scientists and inventors
