= Marguerite Louppe =

French painter (1902–1989)

Marguerite Louppe (1902–1989) was a French painter, best known for her still lifes and landscapes. Her work synthesized the styles of Cubism and Purism. Louppe was married to the French artist Maurice Brianchon.

== Early life ==
Marguerite Louppe was born on 5 September 1902 in the northern city of Commercy. Her father, Alix-Jules Louppe, was an engineer and her mother, Marie-Henriette Juliette Sommer, was of Germano-Lorraine origins. Her grand-uncle Albert Louppe was well known in civil engineering and coordinated the construction of the famous bridge between Brest and the Plougastel peninsula in Brittany (designed by Freyssinet) that bears his name. Louppe's brother Henri attended École Polytechnique and rose to become a member of the board of SEITA, the French tobacco monopoly—the family was well connected and reasonably affluent.

Louppe's family moved to Paris soon after her birth and settled in the affluent 16th arrondissement. She attended the Lycée Molière (the third public girls' school in Paris, founded in 1888) from around 1915 through 1918; there, she and the other girls found themselves holding fundraisers, and writing letters and making bandages for soldiers at the front almost every day. The school was also famous for strict regulation and rigorous standards, so the need for good consistent discipline was repeatedly inculcated into the young Louppe. This was in contrast to the rather indifferent Catholic education of her future husband Maurice Brianchon, which probably led to Marguerite's able management of her husband's studio and career, as well as her own (she was the organizer of Brianchon's Louvre retrospective in 1951).

== Career ==
Louppe attended classes at a variety of the more casual art schools in Paris until 1926: the Académie Julian, the Académie de la Grande Chaumière, the Académie Scandinave, and the Académie André Lhote. The Académie Julian fostered and nurtured a spirit of independence and radicalism which was internalized in Louppe's work, and led to a subtle reimagining of existing stylistic conventions many of which were generated by predecessors such as Pierre Bonnard, André Derain, and Édouard Vuillard, and became the focus of her contemporaries Raymond Legueult, Roland Oudot, and Brianchon. Louppe and Brianchon met at an event at the Académie Julian. They were married on 18 June 1934 and their only child was born a year later.

Brianchon acted as a colleague of Louppe as well as her husband; even before his rise in the French art world, the couple exhibited together as equals. In January 1936, Henri Héraut organized a group exhibition at the Galerie Charpentier titled Premier Salon de la Nouvelle Génération in which was exhibited the “elite of the young painters”, including both Louppe and Brianchon. The exhibition also included the work of Oudot, Legeult, and Constantin Terechkovitch. Further exhibitions at Charpentier continued; La Femme et les Peintres et Sculpteurs Contemporains which took place from 12 December 1941 to 11 January 1942, and included Kees van Dongen, Pierre Bonnard, Aristide Maillol, André Dunoyer de Segonzac, Roland Oudot, Georges Rouault, Georges Braque, and Maurice Denis. Over the years Louppe exhibited her work in Paris at Galerie Charles-Auguste Girard, Galerie Druet, Galerie Louis Carré, and Galerie René Drouet. One project known to have been a collaboration between Brianchon and Louppe was a series of three murals for the Conservatoire National de Musique et d'Art Dramatique de Paris created in 1943. Unfortunately, the schools of music and drama later separated and subsequent renovations left no record of the collaboration. In 1950, Louppe produced a series of gouaches, reproduced as lithographs for the novel Le Jardin de Bêtes Sauvages for noted member of the Académie Française Georges Duhamel.

In 1959, the couple purchased their home in Périgord and divided their time between the country and Paris. Louppe had her own space—a legitimate studio—for the first time. Her two-story studio was an auxiliary building attached to the main house while Brianchon's studio was a detached house about a minute's walk across the lane from where they lived.

In the final period of her active artistic life, Louppe exhibited at Galerie des Granges in Geneva in 1978 and Galerie Yoshii in Paris in 1980. Her last ten years were plagued with declining vision and eventual blindness, and she died in Paris in 1989.

== Artistic style ==
Marguerite Louppe explored mathematical and abstract artistic trends of the day, such as Purism and Cubism. In her early work, Louppe had a figurative focus and she gravitated towards intimate and domestic scenes of daily Parisian life as well as street scenes. By the fifties, she had largely moved away from the human figure to a practice almost solely concerned with still lifes staged in the studio, and eventually landscapes. In her later canvases she employed a mathematical and draftsperson-like process of deconstructing a collection of objects or an exterior landscape into their basic geometry, emphasizing shape, angle, and unexpected formal coincidences. As noted by scholar Saul Ostrow, Louppe's adaptation of linear-skewed geometry in her compositions is unusual in that few women of her generation were working in this manner.

The purchase of the home in Périgord was a major point of intersection and a landmark moment in both Brianchon's and Louppe's careers. After purchasing the property in 1959, the pair spent a majority of their time there and worked daily in their individual studios. Louppe tended to follow a monastic and insular practice, focusing on the intimate and interior life of an artist as well as her studio and the architecture and landscape of the country home. By the 1960s, her landscapes utilized both a Diebenkorn-like abstraction and the mastery of color seen in her earlier work.

Louppe rarely dated her paintings, so any chronology has to be deduced through catalogue and press publications, stylistic similarities, and a methodical evaluation of the types of props she used in still lifes.
