= Sufrim Lopes =

Bissau-Guinean footballer

Sufrim Lopes (born 25 March 1981 in Bissau) is a footballer from Guinea-Bissau who plays as a midfielder for S.C.U. Torreense in the Portuguese Second Division.

Sufrim previously played for Associação Naval 1º de Maio and S.C. Covilhã in the Liga de Honra and Onisilos Sotira in the Cypriot Second Division.
