= Joao Abel Pecas Lopes =

Portuguese electrical engineer

João Abel Peças Lopes is an electrical engineer. He got is License and PhD degrees from Faculdade de Engenharia da Universade do Porto in 1981 and 1988 respectively. He develops his research activities at Instituto de Engenharia de Sistemas e Computadores, Tecnologia, e Ciência (INESC TEC) in Porto, Portugal. He is presently associate director at INESC TEC. He is also Full Professor (Professor Catedrático) at FEUP since 2008. Professor Peças Lopes was named a Fellow of the Institute of Electrical and Electronics Engineers (IEEE) in 2016 for his contributions to microgrids and the integration of wind generation. He is a member of the Power Systems Dynamic Performance Committee of the IEEE PES. He is member of the Board of the Smart Energy Lab, a CoLAB in Energy Services. He is Chair of the Scientific Council of EnergyIn. He is since 2012 Chair of the REN award committee. He is Vice-Presidente of the board of the Portuguese Association for Electric Vehicles. He is presently Chair of the International Steering Committee of the IEEE Power Tech. He is member of the Consulting Board of Agência de Energia do Porto (Porto Energy Agency). He is member of the Scientific Council of FCT. He is Member of the General Council of APREN (Portuguese Association for Renewable Energies) He is Editor of the (SEGAN) Sustainable Energy Grids and Networks journal. He is Honorary member of the editorial board of the IET Energy Conversion and Economics He is Associate editor do Journal on Modern Power Systems and Clean Energy He is Associate editor of the China Electrotechnical Society Transactions on Electrical Machines and Systems. He is co-author of more than 400 publications and co-editor of the book "Electric Vehicles Integration into Modern Power Networks" from Springer. This book was one of the top 50% most downloaded eBooks from Springer. He is registered with more than 10.000 citations. He supervised more than 30 PhD Thesis in Portugal and abroad.
