= Lazuli (disambiguation) =

Lapis lazuli, also referred to as lazuli, is a metamorphic rock

Lazuli may also refer to:

- Lazuli (French band)
- Lazuli (album), by Sam Rivers, 1990
- "Lazuli" (song), by Beach House, 2012

== Other uses ==
- The Lazuli, a family of meerkats in Meerkat Manor
- Lazuli bunting, a bird native to North America.
