= National Weather Association =

- NWA logo
- Abbreviation: NWA
- Formation: December 15, 1975
- Founder: Jerry LaRue
- Type: Professional association
- Legal status: 501(c)(6) non-profit
- Headquarters: Norman, Oklahoma, U.S.
- Coordinates: 35.2226°N 97.4395°W
- Region served: United States (primarily)
- Members: c. 2500
- President: Gail Hartfield
- Subsidiaries: Local and student chapters
- Website: nwas.org

The National Weather Association (NWA), founded in 1975, is an American professional association with a mission to support and promote excellence in operational meteorology and related activities.

== Background ==
The National Weather Association is, along with the American Meteorological Society (AMS), one of the two principal meteorological organizations in the United States. The NWA focuses on operational meteorology, i.e., weather forecasting and the application of forecasts to human affairs. To accomplish this, the Association's objectives are:

1. to provide a medium for all persons interested in weather, including climate, forecasting, observations, observational systems and related research and development for the publishing of letters, pamphlets, periodicals, papers, and Web pages concerning activities in said fields;
2. to provide information, publications, materials, and seminars that will promote forecasting, analysis, observations, training, and education in the meteorological disciplines.

There are dozens of local and student chapters of the National Weather Association. The national organization, as well as some local chapters, conduct conferences on various aspects of operational meteorology (i.e., weather forecasting and presentation). The NWA's primary assembly is the NWA Annual Meeting.

The NWA awards scholarships and grants to mostly undergraduate students, but they do award some scholarships and grants to graduate students majoring in meteorology or a related field of study. The NWA also annually bestows awards to outstanding practicing meteorologists.

NWA engages in advocacy activities, such as releasing policy statements on topics including use of storm shelters, climate change, FCC broadcasting issues, and positions on weather observation systems. The organization also hosts WeatherReadyFest, an annual public outreach event which draws thousands to a different science museum each year ahead of their annual meeting.

== Broadcaster Seal of Approval ==
NWA Seal of Approval

Like the AMS' Certified Broadcast Meteorologist Seal, the NWA also has a Seal of Approval for broadcasters. Sealholders must pass a multiple choice test on meteorological principles and submit tapes to a panel of fellow weathercasters for review. Unlike the AMS seal, a college degree in meteorology or the physical sciences is not required, although there is a minimum experience requirement (a broadcaster must have three full years of on-air experience, or two full years of five-day-a-week forecasting, to qualify for the seal).

The NWA also offers a digital seal, with the goal of distinguishing scientifically based credible weather content on the internet from all others.

== Publications ==
The National Weather Association publishes the following scientific journals:

- Journal of Operational Meteorology (2013–present)
- Electronic Journal of Operational Meteorology (2000 - 2012)
- National Weather Digest (1976 - 2012)

== See also ==
- American Geophysical Union
- WeatherReadyFest
