= Ramón López Soler =

Ramón López Soler (Manresa, 1806 – Barcelona, 1836) was a journalist and writer of the Spanish Romantic Movement. He died while very young, before developing a large body of original work. Along with Buenaventura Carlos Aribau, he founded the magazine El Europeo, which drew upon the collaborations of Englishman Ernesto Kook and Italians Luis Monteggia and Florencio Galli. The periodical exposed Spain to the panorama of European literature and helped introduce Romanticism, both in its Spanish manifestation and as it appeared across Germany, Italy, and England.

== Bibliography ==
- Ricardo Navas Ruiz, El Romanticismo español, Madrid: Cátedra, 1982, 3rd ed.
