= Ruy Belo =

Portuguese poet and essayist (1933–1978)

Ruy de Moura Belo (27 February 1933, in São João da Ribeira – 8 August 1978 in Queluz) was a Portuguese poet and essayist. He is considered one of the most famous existentialists of the twentieth century in Portuguese-speaking countries. Ruy Belo also worked as a translator.

Born in the small community of São João da Ribeira, near Rio Maior, Ruy Belo began to study law at the University of Coimbra Law in 1952. He finished his law degree in 1956 at the University of Lisbon. He then studied canon law at the Pontifical University of St. Thomas Aquinas in Rome. Belo earned a doctorate in the same subject soon afterward, with a thesis entitled Ficção Literária e Censura Eclesiástica, regarding German literary fiction and religious censorship. During his stay in Rome, Ruy Belo was also a member of the Catholic organization Opus Dei.

In 1961, Ruy Belo quit Opus Dei, and published his first poetry book, Aquele Grande Rio Eufrates.

After returning to Portugal, Ruy Belo worked as Assistant Director of Department in the Ministry of Education, a function he resigned for political reasons when he was going to be appointed as Director.

In June 2003, a statue of Ruy Belo was erected in the Parque dos Poetas in Oeiras.

== Works ==
=== Poetry ===
- Aquele Grande Rio Eufrates (1961)
- O Problema da Habitação – Alguns Aspectos (1962)
- Boca Bilingue (1966)
- Homem de Palavra(s) (1969)
- País Possível (1973)
- Transporte no Tempo (1973)
- A Margem da Alegria (1974)
- Toda a Terra (1976)
- Despeço-me da Terra da Alegria (1978)

=== Essays ===
- Poesia Nova (1961)
- Na Senda da Poesia (1969)

=== Translations ===
- Piloto de Guerra (Antoine de Saint-Exupéry)
- Cidadela (Antoine de Saint-Exupéry)
- Moravagine (Blaise Cendrars)
- Poemas Escolhidos (Jorge Luis Borges)
- Dona Rosinha a Solteira ou a Linguagem das Flores (Federico García Lorca)
