= Araceli Lopez-Martens =

French physicist (born 1971)

Araceli Lopez-Martens (born 1971) is a French nuclear physicist specializing in the stability of superheavy elements, and known for her research on the superdeformation of nuclei and her role in the discovery of ^{249}No, the lightest isotope of nobelium. She is a director of research for the French National Centre for Scientific Research.

== Education and career ==
Lopez-Martens was born in 1971. After primary and secondary education in France, she studied physics and Russian at the University of Sussex in England from 1989 to 1993, before returning to France for a diplôme d'études approfondies and doctoral thesis in physics through Paris-Sud University and the Centre de Sciences Nucléaires et de Sciences de la Matière in 1994 and 1996, respectively. Her doctoral dissertation, Étude de la désexcitation des états superdéformés dans la région de masse $a=190$, was directed by Fazia Hannachi.

After completing her doctorate, she became a postdoctoral researcher at the Niels Bohr Institute in Denmark. She has worked as a researcher for the French National Centre for Scientific Research (CNRS) since 1999, initially at the Institut de Recherches Subatomiques (IReS) in Strasbourg, and is currently a director of research for the CNRS, affiliated with the Laboratory of the Physics of the two Infinities – Irène Joliot-Curie, jointly operated by the CNRS, Paris-Saclay University, and the Université Paris Cité.

Her research has involved participation in the international collaborations on the Euroball gamma detector array, the AGATA advanced gamma tracking array, and the S3 Super Separator Spectrometer at the Grand Accélérateur National d'Ions Lourds (GANIL) in France.

== Recognition ==
Lopez-Martens received the CNRS Silver Medal in 2023.
