= Martina López =

American artist

Martina Lopez
- Born: 1962 (age 63–64); Seattle, WA

Martina Lopez (born 1962) is a Mexican-American photographer known for her digital media works combining landscapes and 19th-century portraiture. She is a professor at the University of Notre Dame in Notre Dame, Indiana, although she is originally from Seattle, Washington.

== Early life ==
Raised in a white middle-class neighborhood with seven other siblings of second generation Mexican descent, Lopez moved from Ysleta, El Paso, Texas, to California, and then finally to Seattle, Washington due to her father's military assignments. Lopez found inspiration in her personal life for her works through these changes.

Multiple life-impacting experiences caused her to develop her artistic skills throughout her career. Early on in her life, her sisters use to tease her that she was adopted due to her fair complexion. It was not until her mother showed a photo of her Aunt Clara, who was both tall and fair skinned, in which the teasing stopped. That photo made Lopez feel that she belonged within her own family and their lineage. In 1986, her artistic theme switched to dealing with loss, following the death of her father at the age of 24. This led her to discover photographs as a way to substitute the other missing parts of her family, especially with the usage of photographs of her brother, who was killed in the Vietnam War when she was four years old.

== Education ==
As a photography student at the University of Washington she dabbled in digital images. In 1986, she was introduced to computer imaging by artist Paul Berger at the University of Washington. That same year, her most earliest series of computer-assisted works began after the death of her father. By layering her own portraits of her family, she constructed a landscape that resembled a visual diary of her heritage and personal self. She would later on transfer these same concepts to a shared American culture that survived the changes of the twentieth century. This gave rise to her use of late nineteenth century snapshot portraits of strangers, which gave new life to these photos that were neglected or forgotten about.

While still in school, her father died and Lopez turned to old photo albums to reminisce, when she did this the photos awoke a curiosity and she became inspired to rewrite the narratives differently than what the photographs presented. Lopez has a Bachelor's degree from University of Washington in Seattle, and a Master's degree in 1990 from the School of the Art Institute of Chicago. She is currently a professor of Photography in the Art History department at the University of Notre Dame.

== Artistic process ==
Lopez utilizes the landscape of her portraits in order to place the subject in a choreographed way, in order to leave it to the audience's interpretation of the work. The large scale of her works, usually 40 x 60 inches, plays into this interpretation of her works. The further distance makes the viewer consider the primary character in the image, however, the closer you move towards the image, the awareness of the secondary characters becomes more present.

She also draws heavily from the emotional moments in her life. Both the death of one of her brothers and the birth of her first child plays into her works, which usually deals with the duality of life and death. The foundation of each one of her artistic series is meant to act as an autobiography. At the same time, in order to interpret her works, the specific stories are not needed but they do drive their creation. In essence, her images have become a visual diary through which she comes to terms with life, emphasizing allegories of life, death, and nostalgia.

== Notable works ==
'Heirs Come To Pass 3' (1991) is a silver dye bleach print made from digitally assisted montage, which is currently not on viewing at the Smithsonian American Art Museum. The description emphasizes the artistic choice of using photographs of anonymous individuals from second-hand stores, in order to create a digitally tableaux that is both familiar and haunting.

'Bearing in Mind 1' (1998) by Martina Lopez emphasizes a relatively realistic impression of pictorial space. The illusion is intentionally meant to not look perfect. Steven Skopik notes that the scale and placement are fairly rational and that the viewer readily recognizes the image as an artistic construction. The figures resemble paper dolls, like cutouts, with sharp edges, mismatched lighting and shadows, color discontinuities, and a range of both obvious and subtle visual cues that signal the work’s artificiality. Such images are coherent to a point, but, as with paintings, viewers remain aware of their conventionalized nature.

'Bearing in Mind 2' (1998) is featured in the Seoul Museum of Art. The artistic medium follows a similar 19th century portrait, landscape, and media in order to interpret the human experience. The piece aims to extract the subject and placing them in a fabricated landscape in hopes to retell their story based on what the audience views.

== Collections ==
Lopez's work has been held at The Crossroads Gallery for Contemporary Art, in which curator David Travis writes an extensive description of her work in relation to the collection.

Other museums holding her work include the Seoul Museum of Art, the Philadelphia Museum of Art, the Smithsonian American Art Museum and the Art Institute of Chicago.

== Honors and awards ==
Awarded National Endowment for the Arts Visual Arts Photography Fellowship.

== Publications ==
- Aperture Magazine, Portfolios 1: Computer Photomontage (1994)
- Naomi Rosenblum's A World History of Photography
- The Digital Eye by Silvia Wolf
- 100 Ideas That Changed Photography by Mary Warner Marien
- Digital Photography: Truth, Meaning, Aesthetics by Steven Skopik

== Bibliography ==
- Sylvia Wolf,(1995). Memory/Reference: The Digital Photography of Martina Lopez, The Art Institute of Chicago
- Aperture (1994) Vol.136, Martina Lopez, ISSN 0003-6420
- Newsweek (1994), Barbara Kantrowitz, Vol.124, An Evolving Technoculture, ISSN 0028-9604
