= Lapis (disambiguation) =

Lapis may refer to:

== Geology ==
- Lapis lazuli, a gemstone
- Lapis armenus, a precious stone resembling lapis lazuli
- Lapis Lacedaemonius, a form of andesite

=== Specific stones ===
- Lapis Satricanus, a stone in the ruins of Satricum
- Lapis philosophorum, a name for the philosopher's stone

== Computing ==
- Lapis (text editor), an experimental text editor with multiple simultaneous editing
- Lapis, an interactive art work by video game designer Heather Kelley

== Fictional characters ==
- Lapis, a character in the Kaze no Stigma light novel series
- Lapis, a character in the Rental Magica light novel series
- Lapis Lazuli, a character in the Land of the Lustrous manga series
- Lapis Lazuli, a character in the Steven Universe animated television series
- Lapis and Lazuli, characters in the Hamtaro anime television series
- Androids 17 and 18 (real names Lapis and Lazuli, respectively), characters in the Dragon Ball manga series

== Other uses ==
- Lapis, trade name for a preparation of silver nitrate against warts
- Lapis (magazine), Italian feminist magazine
- Kue lapis, an Indonesian dessert.
