= Jean Lopez (actress) =

Filipina actress (1939/1940–2026)

- Born: 1939 or 1940
- Died: September 1, 2026 (aged 86)
- Occupation: Actress
- Years active: 1960s

Jean Lopez (1939 or 1940 – September 1, 2026) was a Filipina actress who was active in the 1960s.

== Career ==
Jean Lopez was one of the main stars of Sampaguita Pictures. The actress appeared in various films in the 1960s and was cast as the leading lady with other popular comedians and matinee idols during her time.

She also was the host of the 1960s noontime television show, Tayo'y Maghapi-Hapi.

== Personal life and death ==
Lopez married actor Romano Castellvi in 1969. She retired from being an actress shortly after her marriage. The couple migrated to Canada in the 1970s where they raised their two daughters. Lopez died on September 1, 2026, at the age of 86.

== Filmography ==
Film

- Ang Magkakapitbahay (1960)
- Dobol Trobol (1960)
- Operetang Sampay-Bakod (1961)
- Kandidatong Pulpol (1961)
- Eca Babagot(1961)
- Si Lucio at Si Miguel (1962)
- Tanzan the Mighty (1962)
- Susanang Daldal (1962)
- Detektib Kalog (1963)
- Mga Batang Iskwater (1964)
- Mga Batang Turista (1965)
- The Sound of Buwisit (1965)
- Inday ng Buhay Ko (1966)
- Ito ang Dahilan (1966)
- Together Again (1967)
- Ayos na Darling (1968)
- Let's Do It: The Las Vegas Way (1970)

Television

- Tayo'y Maghapi-Hapi (1960s)
