= Piña colada =

Puerto Rican cocktail with rum, coconut, and pineapple

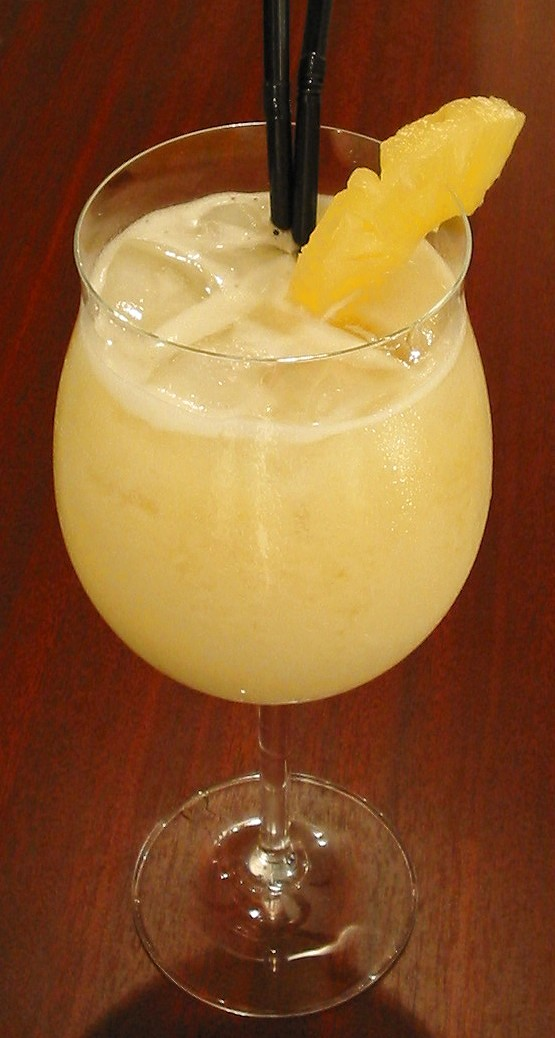
- Type: Cocktail
- Ingredients: 50 ml white rum; 30 ml cream of coconut; 50 ml fresh pineapple juice
- Base spirit: Rum
- Standard drinkware: Hurricane glass
- Standard garnish: Maraschino cherry or pineapple wedge
- Served: Frozen: blended with ice
- Preparation: Blend all the ingredients with ice in an electric blender, pour into a large glass, and serve with straws.

The piña colada is a cocktail made with rum, cream of coconut and pineapple juice, usually served either shaken with ice or blended. It it usually garnished with either a pineapple wedge or a maraschino cherry, or both. The drink originated in Puerto Rico.

== Etymology ==
The name piña colada (Spanish) literally means 'strained pineapple,' a reference to the freshly pressed and strained pineapple juice used in the drink's preparation.

== History ==
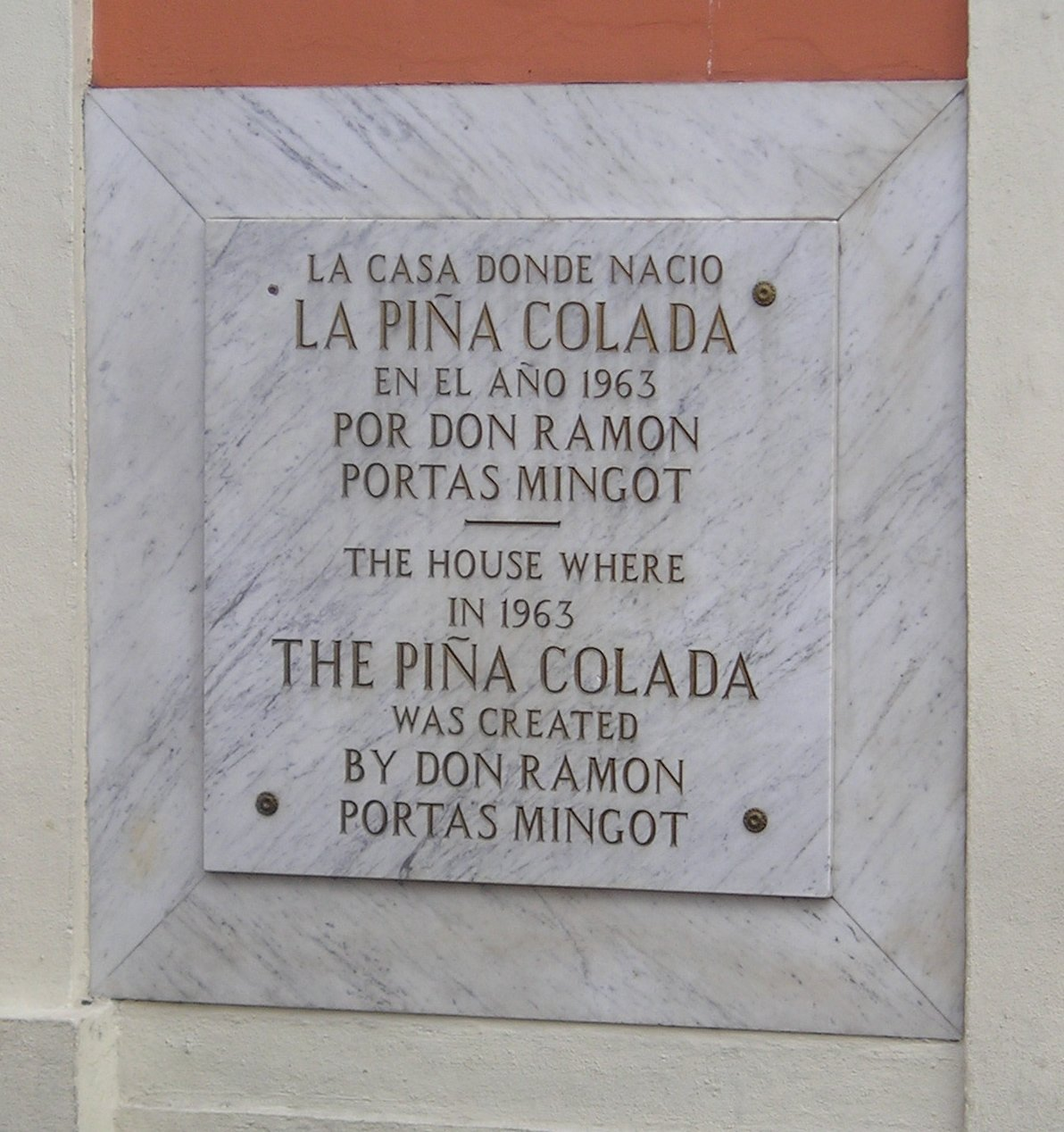
Ramón Portas Mingot is one of two bartenders credited with creating the drink in Puerto Rico.

=== Folk origins ===
The earliest known folktale states that in the 19th century, Puerto Rican pirate Roberto Cofresí, to boost the morale of his crew, gave them a beverage or cocktail that contained coconut, pineapple, and white rum. This was what would be later known as piña colada. With his death in 1825, the recipe for the beverage was lost.

=== First mentions ===
In 1922, Travel magazine described piña colada as sugar, lime, and ice mixed in with pineapple juice and Bacardi rum.

In 1924, National Geographic magazine, reporting from Puerto Rico, mentioned a pineapple juice and crushed ice beverage, known locally as piña fría (cold pineapple).

In 1950, The New York Times reported that "Drinks in the West Indies range from Martinique's famous rum punch to Cuba's pina colada (rum, pineapple and coconut milk)."

=== Creation ===
In 1954, University of Puerto Rico Professor Ramon López Irizarry invented a new, improved method for the extraction of coconut cream. He patented the process and created Coco López, a sweet, creamy coconut cream, which was used in the invention of the piña colada in Puerto Rico. This product, sold today as Cream of Coconut, is widely available around the world, and is most commonly used to make the cocktail.

The Caribe Hilton Hotel claims Ramón "Monchito" Marrero created the piña colada in 1954 while a bartender at the hotel. According to this account, Marrero finally settled upon the recipe for the piña colada, which he felt captured the true nature and essence of Puerto Rico. The hotel was presented with a proclamation in 2004 by Puerto Rico Governor Sila María Calderón celebrating the drink's 50th anniversary. Initially, the drink was served more like a milkshake, consisting of vanilla ice cream, coconut cream, and pineapple juice blended together, often without alcohol for the hotel's snack bar. To appeal to adult guests, rum was added, and it eventually evolved from a milkshake-style drink into the blended, creamy cocktail known today.

A Spaniard by the name of Ricardo García also claims to have invented the drink in 1953, while working at the Caribe Hilton Hotel in San Juan. Ricardo García piña colada is made with frozen pineapple juice, coco López cream of coconut, heavy cream, rum, garnished with a cherry, and pineapple wedge.

Barrachina, a restaurant in Puerto Rico, says that "a traditional Spanish bartender Don Ramón Portas Mingot in 1963 created what became the world's famous drink: the Piña Colada."

In 1978, Puerto Rico proclaimed the cocktail to be its official drink.

Today's piña colada has evolved from a sugary, frozen 1970s slushie into a refined, high-quality cocktail, often crafted with fresh ingredients, premium local rums, and lighter, less-sugary profiles served over ice rather than blended. Lime and Angostura bitters are both popular ingredient in a modern piña colada. Lime is used to balance the sweetness of coconut cream and pineapple juice with bright acidity. Angostura bitters makes the drink complex, spicy, and "funky".

== Preparation ==
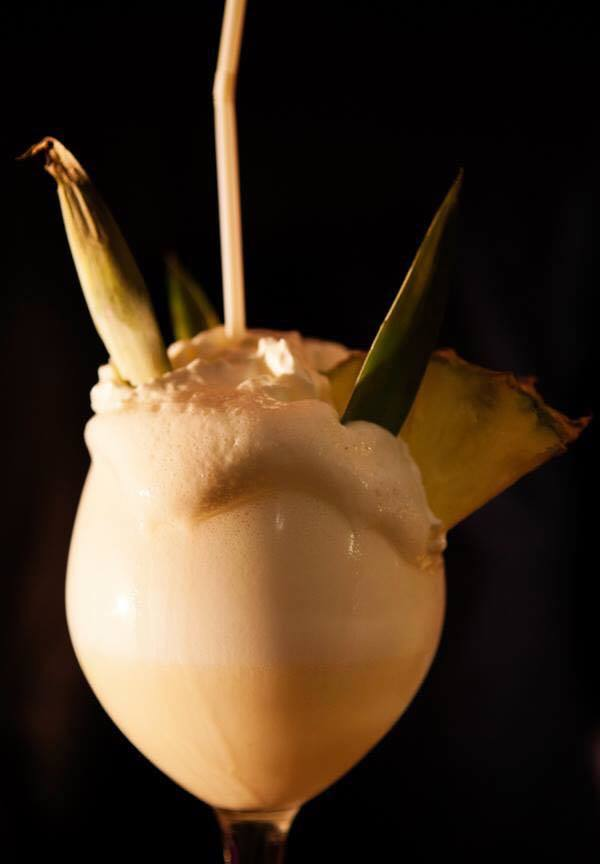
Piña colada

As recounted by his friends in José L. Díaz de Villegas's book, the original Monchito recipe was to pour 85 grams of cream of coconut, 170 grams of pineapple juice and 43 grams of white rum into a blender or shaker with crushed ice, blend or shake very well until smooth, then pour into chilled glass and garnish with pineapple wedge and/or a maraschino cherry.

There are many recipes for piña colada. The International Bartenders Association specifies it as:

Ingredients

- (5 parts) 5 cl (1.7 US fl oz) white rum
- (3 parts) 3 cl (1.0 US fl oz) cream of coconut
- (5 parts) 5 cl (1.7 US fl oz) pineapple juice

Method

Mix with crushed ice in blender until smooth, then pour into a chilled glass, garnish and serve. Alternately, the three main components can simply be added to a cocktail glass with ice cubes.

In San Juan, Puerto Rico, a different recipe is used:

Ingredients

- 1 US fl oz (3.0 cl) heavy cream
- 6 US fl oz (18 cl) frozen freshly pressed pineapple juice
- 1 US fl oz (3.0 cl) cream of coconut
- 2 US fl oz (5.9 cl) rum

Method

Freeze pineapple juice before use. In a blender, combine cream of coconut, frozen pineapple juice, heavy cream and rum. Pour in a desired 12-ounce container and use a cherry and fresh pineapple for a garnish.

=== Variations ===
Different proportions of the core ingredients, as well as different types of rum, may all be used in the piña colada. Frozen piña coladas are also served. Other named variations include

- Lava Flow or Miami Vice – strawberry daiquiri and piña colada layered in one glass.
- Scotsman colada – substitute Scotch whisky for rum.
- Tepache colada – a piña colada variation using tepache developed by JungleBird in Santurce, San Juan, Puerto Rico. Recipe calls for 1.5 oz gold rum, 2 oz tepache and 1.5 oz cream of coconut.
- Virgin colada – a non-alcoholic variation. There are various popular recipes, usually the ingredients are similar to a regular piña colada, simply omitting the rum.

== In popular culture ==
In the United States, National Piña Colada Day is celebrated on 10 July.

The cocktail gained worldwide fame after Rupert Holmes's 1979 song, "Escape (The Piña Colada Song)," became an international hit.

Piña coladas are referred to in the 2023 Eurovision entry "Cha Cha Cha" by Finnish rapper and singer Käärijä, in which he describes drinking piña coladas after an exhausting week, before letting himself go on the dancefloor. The song led to an increased popularity of the drink in Finland.
