= Coco López =

Puerto Rican coconut product

Coco López (English: "Coconut López") is a Puerto Rican producer of a brand of coconut products sold internationally. It is best known for its use in the piña colada cocktail, which was first invented in Puerto Rico using Coco López coconut cream.

Coco López was invented by Ramón López Irizarry, a World War I veteran who was an agricultural professor for the University of Puerto Rico. López left the university and commercialized his product, which eventually found its way into the supermarkets of the island. Its most popular product, Cream of Coconut, is made of coconut cream with the addition of sugar as a sweetener, xanthan gum as a stabilizer, and citric acid as a flavoring and preservative agent.

== See also ==
- Coco Rico
- Cuisine of Puerto Rico
- List of Puerto Ricans
