= Hernan López-Schier =

Developmental biologist and neuroscientist

Hernán López-Schier

Personal details
- Education: University of Cambridge
- Profession: Biomedical scientist
- Scientific career
- Fields: Developmental biology Neuroscience
- Workplaces: The Rockefeller University; University of Cambridge; Centre for Genomic Regulation; Harvard University; National Institute of Genetics; Helmholtz Center Munich; New York University Abu Dhabi
- Thesis: (2002)
- Doctoral advisor: Daniel St Johnston

Dr. Hernán López-Schier is a developmental biologist and neuroscientist known for his work on sensory biology and organ regeneration. He is an associate faculty at the Graduate School of Quantitative Biology at LMU Munich, Germany, and visiting professor at the New York University Abu Dhabi, United Arab Emirates.

== Education ==
López-Schier trained in molecular genetics at the Rockefeller University in New York City. In 1997, he moved to the University of Cambridge to pursue a PhD in genetics and cell biology at the Gurdon Institute under the mentorship of Daniel St Johnston, FRS.

== Career ==
After his PhD, López-Schier joined the group of Kavli Prize laureate A. James Hudspeth as a Postdoctoral Fellow, funded by the Wellcome Trust and the Life Sciences Research Foundation as Howard Hughes Medical Institute fellow. In 2007, he moved to the Centre for Genomic Regulation in Barcelona, Spain, as junior group leader, funded by the Spanish Ministry of Science and Innovation and an award by the European Research Council. In 2011–2016 he chaired a Research Networking Program from the European Science Foundation. Between 2012 and 2023 he was research unit director at the Helmholtz Zentrum München, and member of the Graduate School of Systemic Neurosciences at LMU Munich, Germany. Other academic positions were as Visiting Scholar at the National Institute of Genetics in Mishima, Japan in 2008 and 2019, Visiting Scientist at the Janelia Research Campus in 2014, Visiting professor at Harvard University, and member of the Professional Development Committee at the Society for Neuroscience from 2020 to 2023. He has served at scientific review panels for Austrian, French, Spanish, Portuguese, Swiss and British government agencies, and is a member of the Project Evaluation Committee of the EMBL Imaging Centre. In 2019, he was appointed to the Scientific Advisory Board of the biotechnology company Sensorion.

His group has made a significant contribution to sensory regeneration, having been the first to use optogenetics to repair damaged neurons, and the first to identify the source of hair-cell regeneration. As of 2023, he has an H-index of 29.
