= Simon Pardiñas López =

Spanish dentist (born 1987)

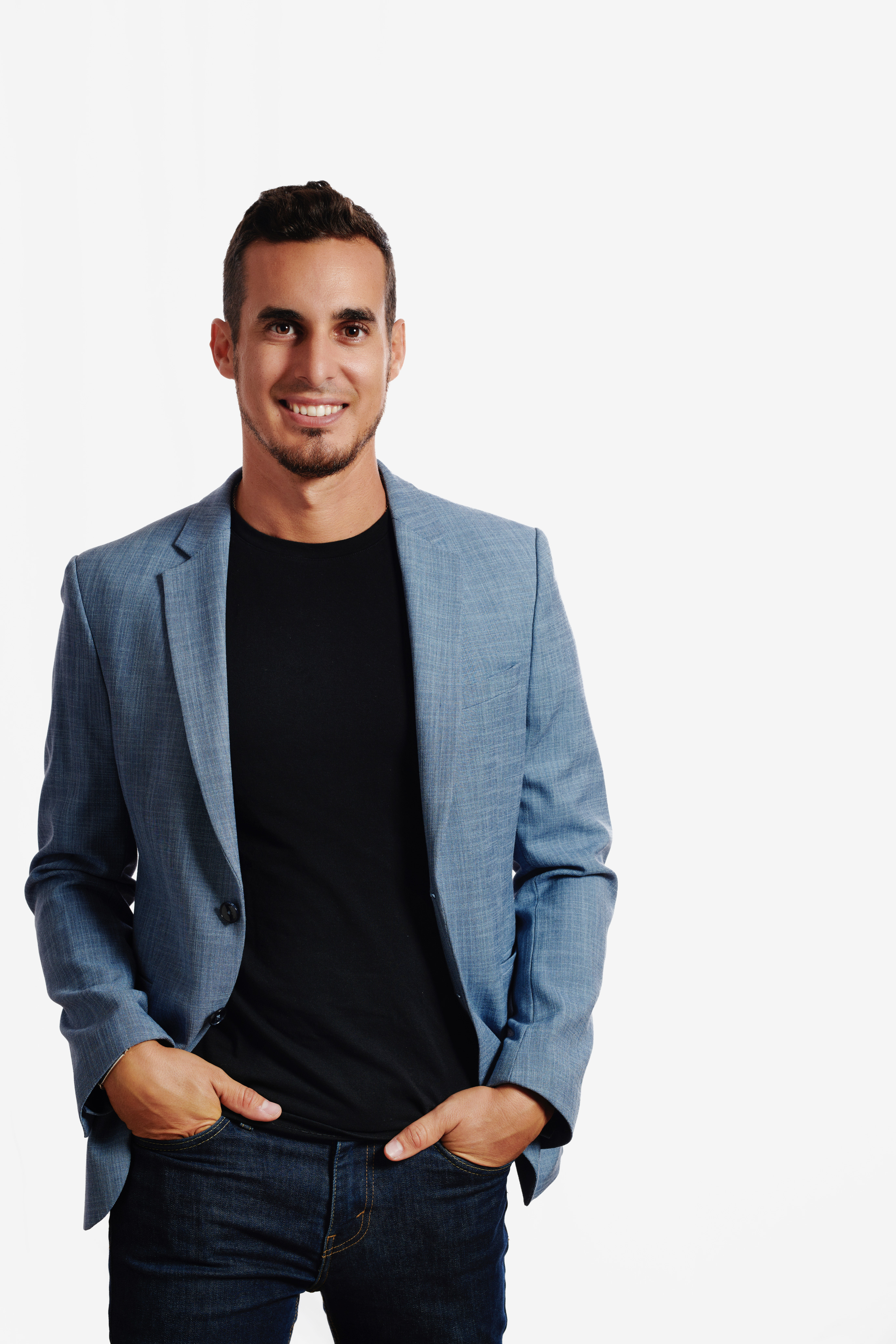
- Simón Pardiñas in Academy of Osseointegration
- Born: Simón Pardiñas López; November 10, 1987 (age 38); A Coruña, Spain
- Education: New York University, Complutense University of Madrid, University of Toulouse
- Occupations: Dentist, YouTuber

Simon Pardiñas López (born November 10, 1987) is a Spanish dentist and YouTuber. He is the head dentist of the Spanish professional football club Deportivo de La Coruña. Pardiñas López was born in Spain, A Coruña, on November 10, 1987. He was influenced in medicine by his parents who were specialized in dental implants in Galicia. At an early age, Pardiñas López adopted the use of technologies.

== Education ==
In 2010, Pardiñas López obtained a degree in dentistry. In 2011 and 2013 he studied Oral Surgery and Periodontics at New York University and later became an expert in Periodontics at the Complutense University of Madrid. In 2014 he obtained a master's degree in Oral and Maxillofacial Implantology at the University of Toulouse and fellowship at International Congress of Oral Implatologists.

In 2025, Pardiñas López received a Doctor of Health Science from the Universidade da Coruña. His doctoral thesis, titled “Application of Coconut Oil in Oral Health,” was defended in December 2025, receiving the highest distinction and the mention Cum Laude.

== Career ==
Pardiñas López conducted clinical studies on epigenetics modifications in Peri-implantitisand the oral microbiome as a marker for the risk of colorectal carcinogenesis. During 2019 he was research project coordinator at the Bluestone Center for Clinical Research at New York University.

He is medical director of the Pardiñas Medical Dental Clinic, and of the department of Periodontics, Oral Surgery and Implants. He is a member of the Cellular Therapy and Regenerative Medicine Group of INIBIC and SERGAS and of the Meigabiome group of the Hospital of La Coruña in research on colorectal cancer and periodontal disease.

Pardiñas López serves as an Adjunct professor at the Oral and Maxillofacial Department of the New York University.

Pardiñas López is the founder of the YouTube channel, Dentalk, where he exposes 3D animation videos on dentistry and Oral hygiene. In 2023 he got 1 million subscribers. He is president of the Young Clinicians Committee of the Academy of Osseointegration.

Pardiñas López frequently appears in different press, radio and TV media as scientific advisor on oral health matters.

== Award ==
- 2012: Best of the promotion XXI Promotion Master of Implantology and Oral Rehabilitation of the European School of Oral Rehabilitation, Implantology and Biomaterials.
- 2019: Gold Medal Digital Health Awards on Social Media.
- 2022: Awarded for Work in Communication and Marketing from Gaceta Dental newspaper.
- 2023: YouTube’s Golden Badge for his channel Dentalk on reaching 1 million subscribers.

== Publication ==
Pardiñas López has contributed to research in oral surgery, periodontology, and implantology. His work includes case reports, clinical trials, and meta-analyses, often exploring regenerative therapies and peri-implant disease. Below is a selection of his published studies:

- "Histomorphometric analysis of a biopsy harvested 10 years after maxillary sinus augmentation with ABBM and PRGF" (2015)
- "Treatment of an unusual non-tooth-related enamel pearl associated with localized periodontal disease: a case report" (2015)
- "Comparison of different graft materials for alveolar ridge preservation: a Bayesian network meta-analysis" (2017)
- "Bone regeneration after medication-related osteonecrosis of the jaw using plasma rich in growth factors (PRGF): a new approach" (2019)
- "The efficacy of growth factors for the treatment of peri-implant diseases: a systematic review and meta-analysis" (2020)
- "Global DNA methylation in gingiva and bone from patients with implant failure due to peri-implantitis: a pilot study" (2022)
- "Anti-inflammatory and antimicrobial efficacy of coconut oil for periodontal pathogens: a randomized clinical trial" (2025)
- "Teeth or Implants" in Iocca, Oreste (ed.) Evidence-Based Implant Dentistry

Pardiñas López has also published Cuida tu Boca [Take Care of your Mouth], a non-academic guide to oral health for the general population.
