= Vladislav Šír =

Czech medical doctor and ornithologist (1830–1889)

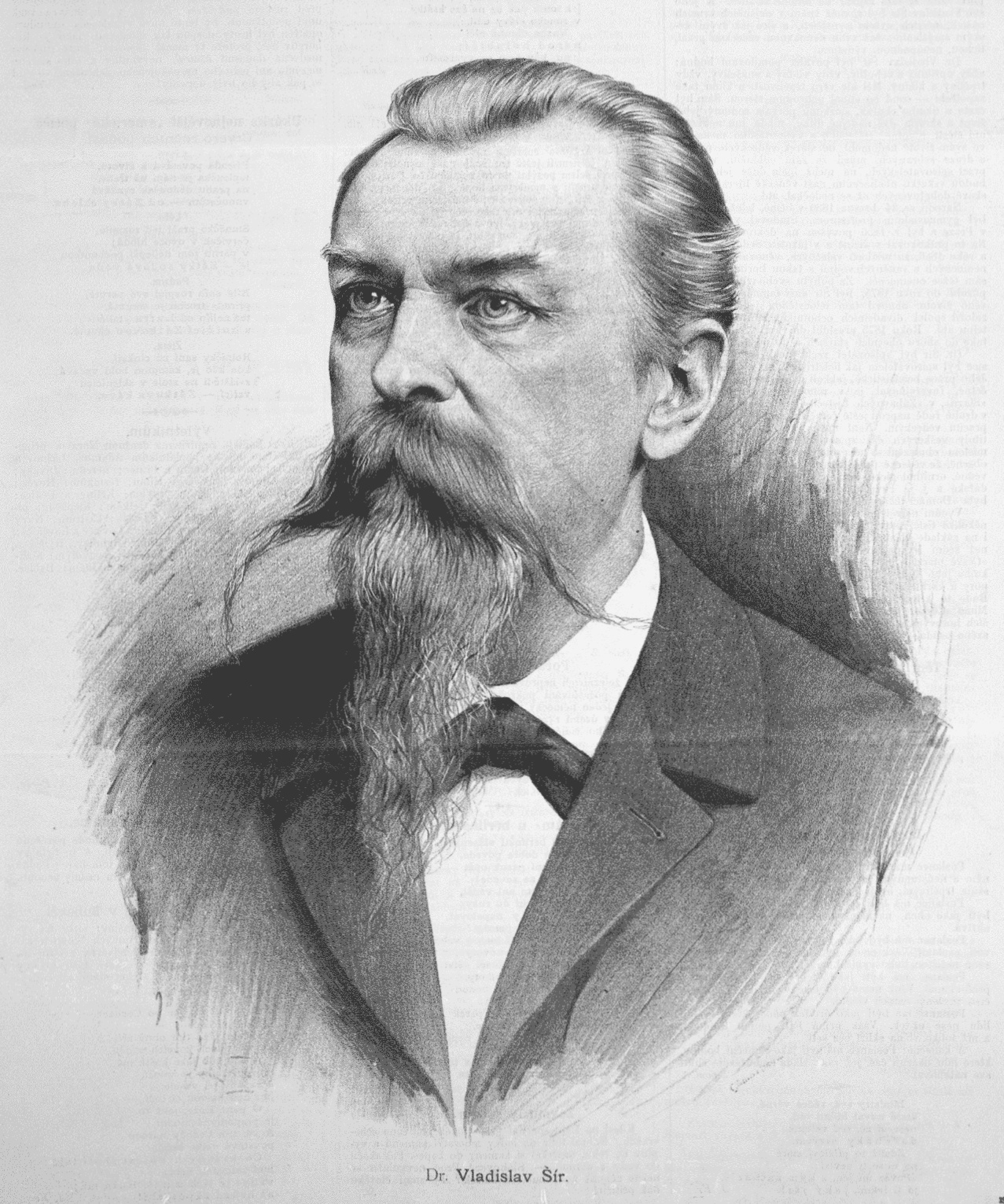
Portrait of Šír by Jan Vilímek

Vladislav Šír (German: Vladislav/Wladislav Schier; 26 March 1830 – 24 April 1889) was a Czech medical doctor and ornithologist. He collected natural history specimens and wrote several books on the fauna of Bohemia.

== Biography ==
Šír was born in Jičín in Bohemia, Austrian Empire, and after education at the local K. K. gymnasium where his father was director, he went to the normal school and grammar school before going to the Charles University in Prague, where he graduated in 1850 in medicine and became a surgeon in 1858. He served in Prague during the typhoid fever epidemic of 1855. He worked in the place of Antonín Vincenc Šlechta, knight Sedmihorský of Wartenberg. He then worked at the Jičín hospital and at the same time studied the birds of the region. During the war, he served at the military hospital, but in 1866 he fell ill with cholera.

He headed the Czech society for bird preservation and wrote several books including Škodlivé ptactvo ('harmful birds', i.e. birds of prey). In 1875 he moved to Prague and became a member of the city council two years later. He served in several honorary posts and was a part of the writers' association "Svatobor". Along with František Špatný, he took an interest in pigeons. He was also for sometime an honorary inspector of schools. As a member of the Bohemian Bird Protection Association, he edited its newsletter. He also prepared a questionnaire in 1877 requesting information on the names of birds nesting, their local names, their seasonality and so on. This was sent to all the elementary schools in Bohemia and he was able to collect a large amount of information which he compiled. A major work was the four volume work on the birds of Czech Ptactvo české (1889–1890).
