= Lopes (footballer) =

Brazilian footballer (born 1983)

Personal information
- Full name: Astolpho Junio Lopes
- Date of birth: March 11, 1983 (age 43)
- Place of birth: Itaperuna-RJ, Brazil
- Height: 1.90 m (6 ft 3 in)
- Position: Goalkeeper

Team information
- Current team: Icasa

Youth career
- 2000–2001: Bangu

Senior career*
Years	Team	Apps	(Gls)
2002–2004	Bangu		
2003	→ Juventus-SP (loan)		
2004–2009	Botafogo	35	(0)
2009	Ceará	29	(0)
2010	Itumbiara		
2010	Duque de Caxias	23	(0)
2011	Remo		
2011–2012	Fortaleza	48	(0)
2011	→ Treze (loan)	4	(0)
2013	ABC	19	(0)
2014	Bonsucesso	6	(0)
2016	Icasa	6	(0)
2017	Colinas		
- * Club domestic league appearances and goals

Astolpho Junio Lopes (born March 11, 1983), or simply Lopes, is a Brazilian football goalkeeper, who plays for Icasa.

== Honours ==
- Rio de Janeiro's Cup: 2007

== Contract ==
June 3, 2009, to November 30, 2009
