= Baia de Aramă Monastery =

Sfinții Voievozi monastery - Baia de Aramă
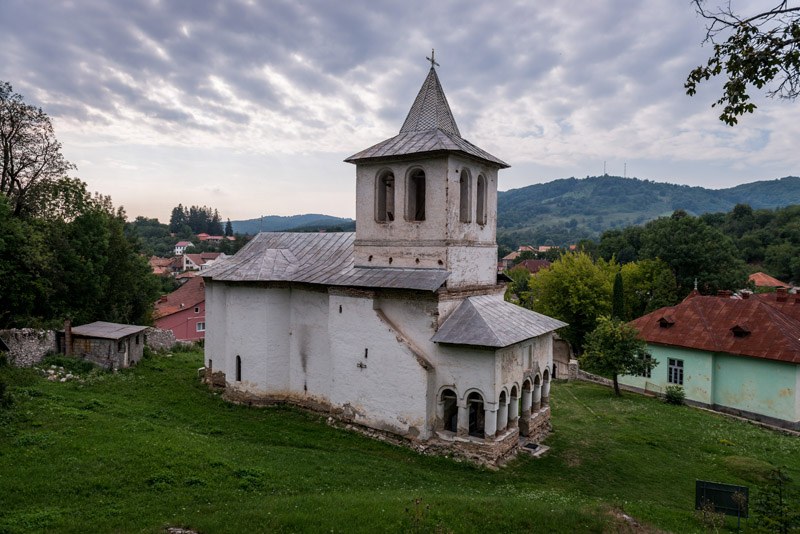
- An outside shot of the monastery
- Sfinții Voievozi monastery - Baia de Aramă
- 45.000287°N 22.804473°E
- Location: Baia de Aramă, Mehedinți County
- Country: Romania
- Denomination: Eastern Orthodoxy

History
- Status: Monastery
- Founded: 1699-1703
- Founder(s): zupan Milko voivoda Constantin Brancoveanu ban Cornea Brailoiu

Architecture
- Style: Romanian architecture

Baia de Aramă monastery (Romanian: Mănăstirea Baia de Aramă) is a monastery in Baia de Aramă, Romania, located in the north-west area of Oltenia, in the Mehedinți Plateau, sheltered by a small depression, surrounded by the Dochiciu, Dealu-Mare and Cornet hills, it communicates through national roads with Târgu Jiu, Motru, Strehaia and Turnu Severin, but also with the Băile Herculane and Bala resorts.

The monastery has begun its activity already in the year 1703, and the church wall painting features fresco decorations, entirely conserved in their original form. The painting is specific to interior decorations of the late 17th century, beginning of the 18th century of the Romanian territory in between the Southern Carpathians and the Danube.

Initially inhabited by monks, the monastery was restored by the decision of the Metropolitan Synod in 2008, when it was reestablished as the Mănăstirea Sfinții Voievozi of the Baia de Aramă town, a nun monastery, under the jurisdiction of the Diocese of Severin and Strehaia. Its abbess is nun Mihaela Păiuș (as of 2013).

== History ==
Fresco of Župan Milko, depicted holding the church model in his hands — the standard iconographic attribute identifying him as the ktitor (founder) — flanked by his wife Županitsa Mara and their two sons. All inscriptions are in Cyrillic script.

Co-founder Constantin Brancoveanu and his wife Maritsa

Built at the bridge between the 17th century and the 18th century, the monastery church reflects the stylistic features of the previous times of cultural and artistic development and founder act emphasis, during the reign of Matei Basarab (1632-1654), registering in an artistic movement by which the Romanian County's architecture evolves into the new directions and visions of the Brancoveanian period. The influences of this historic and creative convergence area extend to the period after the reign of the great ruler, when the monuments from Oltenia in the beginning of the 18th century largely retains the stylistic features of the previous century, organically integrating themselves into the prior constructive era, while taking innovative elements from the opening and decorative variety of the Brâncovenesc style.

The new monastery, strategically and defensively built, enrolls in an artistic movement specific to the recovery, extension and lifting actions of military constructions with a civil function or of religious buildings with a security purpose as well. Oscillating between tradition and innovation, the architectural art and painting at this stage of foundation crosses a turning point in the development of Romanian culture of the Middle Ages, leaving the old forms previously established by craftsmen and evolving towards a power of creativity and originality specific to the Brancoveanian era, proving that the local craftsmen fully mastered the technical and artistic methods and that they also had a great sense of balance and proportion that gradually made possible the innovative daring.

== Geographical Emplacement ==
The Baia de Aramă Monastery is located in the north-west Oltenia, in the Mehedinţi Plateau. It is nested in a small valley by surrounding hills Dochiciu, Dealul-Mare and Cornet and the city communicates through national roads with Târgu Jiu, Motru, Strehaia, Drobeta Turnu Severin, as well as with Băile Herculane and Bala resorts. Brebina River runs through this old small city. Baia de Aramă is positioned on latitude 45°. The neighboring towns Brebina, Titerleşti, Bratilovu, Mărăşeşti and Stăneşti also belong to Baia de Aramă.

== Dating ==
According to local tradition, the ancient monastic settlement (which was originally a monk monastery) dates back to the 15th century, from the time of Saint Nicodim of Tismana, having a wooden church with mesh covering. A document of 1672 mentions Evghenie, the monastery abbot from the Hilandar Monastery of Mount Athos.

In the former place of the wooden church the new building is built but only in the late 17th century, when the abbot was Archimandrite Vasile from Hilandar and following the advice of Constantin Brâncoveanu that, between June 9 and 12 of 1695, passing from Cerneţi to Tismana, consents and supports the building of a place of worship (the ruler donates 300 taels for the common edification of the church).

The true founders may be considered zupan Milco Baiasul, foreman of the local miners, of Serbian origin who had asked the ruler to make the cornerstone of the new church in remembrance of his son Milco, as well as Cornea Brailoiu, Great Ban of Craiova, relative of Constantin Brâncoveanu, who will support the work on behalf of the ruler.

Because of the Turkish incursions, the construction starts later on May 22, 1699 and ends on May 7, 1703, when the consecration of the church takes place. It takes only a year, to bring up the building and we know that because the painter, Ivan, signs his name on the outside in 1700.

Around this year the painting of the place of worship also takes place and the painters are the renowned Neagoe and Partenie of Tismana.

The church is built of brick and cinder from smelting copper mines. The outside enclosure wall probably dates from the same time as the church, and it was originally made of mountain stone linked with lime mortar mixed with soil.

The historical evidence of the founders and painters is proven by the Cyrillic inscription painted on the west wall of the nave:

The founder's Cyrillic inscription of Župan Milko at Baia de Aramă Monastery

Cu vrerea Tatălui, a Fiului și cu săvârșirea Duhului Sfântu au făcut această sfântă biserică dumnealui jupânulu Cornea Brăiloiu velu Banu, dimpreună cu dumnealui jupânului Milco Băiașul nepotu de frate lui Poznanu căpitan cu toată cheltuiala dumnealoru și fiind igumenu Vasile arhimandritu în zilele prealuminatului și bunului creștin Domnu Ion Constandinu Basarab Voievod. Începutu-s-au a să zidi această sfântă biserică la mai 22 leat 7027 (1699) și s-au săvârșitu cu toastă podoaba ei la mai 7 leat 7211 (1703). Eu cu mâna-mi păcătoasă am zugrăvit biserica, Neagoe și Parthenie, eromonah din Tismana. (Note: In English: "By the will of the Father, Son and Holy Spirit, this holy church was built by Cornea Brailoiu, together with Milco Baiasul, on their expense, while the Abbot was Archimandrite Vasile, during the ruling of Ion Constandinu Basarab. The construction of this holy church started on May 22, 7027 (1699) and ended in its entire beauty on May 7, 7211 (1703). And, me, Neagoe and Parthenie of Tismana, I painted this church with my sinful hand.")

The monastery has started its activity since 1703. Functioning as a hermitage, the settlement was later (before 1718) dedicated to The Hilandar Monastery of Mount Athos. Baia de Arama Monastery was a center of intercultural spiritual interferences, because it was constantly under the Greek or Serbian abbots, while also creating communion relationships with the neighboring Serbian people and hosting a rich cultural and ecclesiastical exchange of experience.

Out of the old construction, only the Priory house was kept, and after the secularization it became the priest's house and the parish church. The wall cells occupying the hill side of the monastery were destroyed with time. In the year 1890 they were still lived in.

At the Oltenia Metropolitan Synod meeting from January 29, 2008, the re-establishment of the Monastery of Holy Kings of Baia de Arama was approved, as a nunnery under the jurisdiction of the Diocese of Severin and Strehaia, and with nun Isidora Rusu as an Abbess. The Monastery will operate within Baia de Arama Deanery. In 2011 nun Mihaela Paius was chosen as abbess of the convent.

== Architecture ==
From the architectural point of view, the church corresponds to the artistic creation type that tracks the renewing trends from the Mateine period by promoting European decorative values, while preserving the traditional forms.

The simple architecture of the church blends the style of the Matei Basarab age, belonging to the 17th century, characterized by big buildings with the bell tower on the nave and by columns of circular brick and the bell tower staircase on the north wall, with the Brâncovenesc style of the 18th century, the novelty being that the porch is supported by columns in the arcade, and also the carved iconostasis.

The building is part of the tri-lobed plan churches category with the polygonal apses on the outside, with a porch, with the bell tower above the narthex, with a nave with two semicircular apses and another semicircular one on the interior.

The construction consists of load-bearing walls of brick. The church is built of bricks well burnt 27 * 14 * 3 cm, alternating at times with cinder blocks of brass, strong and economical material that forms many walls in the city. The joints are filled with very strong mortar, 5 cm thick.

The porch is open, supported by ten massive brick columns and trilobite arches. The vaulting consists of a hemispherical dome, supported by two lateral arcs. Access is on the main axis of the porch and the south side. Full-width porch is rectangular, with five arches in front, two to the north and one to the south, all in the shape of a horseshoe. Those are supported by ten columns, including the two engaged in wall. Columns are placed on a solid base discontinued at the front entrance and at the south entrance.

The rectangular narthex is covered with a brick hemispheric dome, supported by two side arches, supported by consoles. East-west wide arches are not extended on one level up to the north and south walls, but are only reinforced side cap for a width of 60 cm, their lateral side being at a higher level.

Above the narthex, the square bell tower opens, having two niches on each side, in arcades with semicircles each having one tie of oak. The tower access door is in the northwest corner. The stairs are designed in the northern wall, which was particularly built thicker. Between the nave and narthex there is a wall with an arched opening in the middle.

The nave has two lateral semicircular apses, and the vaulting is also made of semicircular cupolas. The nave has a very flattened dome on four arches supported on four poles forming a square in the center.

The shrine is semicircular, vaulted with a semi dome. Here we also find The Oblation carved in the massive masonry. The area designed for the deacon is suggested by a simple niche.

Separation of the nave from the altar is made by a wooden iconostasis. The iconostasis is carved in linden wood, in the Brâncovenesc style.

Throughout the church the floor is made of wood. The altar is at a higher level than the rest of the church. The windows are narrow, without stone frames. No changes were made in the past.

The facade decoration is simple, with a plaster made from lime and sand. In the upper zone, below the cornice there is a simple belt, with bricks arranged as the saw teeth.

The roof is made from wood framing with sheet metal cover.

== Wall Painting ==
The interior decoration is very beautiful and it comes to complete the entire monument's value. The original painting is executed from the porch to the altar in fresco technique, and it is fully preserved. The interior painting is specific to the end of the 17th century and the beginning of the 18th century trend from the Romanian territory between the Carpathians and the Danube. A lot of religious buildings from that time kept the fine print techniques of famous painters as Neagoe and Partenie of Tismana proving a particular skill in the use of surface and organization of painted decoration.

Portrait art is highlighted by Serbian saints: Athonite Fathers Saints Simeon and Sava (1200, 1235), father and son, former rulers of Serbia, Stefan Dušan (1308-1355), Holy Martyrs Chiric (aged 3 years) and his mother Iulita, painted at the request of Archimandrite Vasile and Milco. Topics as St. Sava and Simeon, St. Nicodim, are inspired from the painting found in Hilandar Monastery, also revealing external influences on the traditional painting techniques. The portrait of the great Serbian ruler Stefan Dušan (1331-1355) which is in the narthex, similar to the one found at the Hilandar Monastery, seems to be the only one in the country. By the artistic way of doing the portrait, the entire worship of the founders towards the national hero of their country of origin is expressed. The votive paintings are also specific to the Brâncovenesc style.

== The Monastery Treasures ==
From the Hilandar Monastery, just a few heritage objects, received as a gift, still exist: a silver filigree censer, an encrypted grail, an ornate reliquary containing bones presumed to be from the monastery ossuary, a lamp from 1856, some files from a Greek Gospel, and at the Oltenia Mitropoly Museum there is a silver-plated wooden cross.

== Restoration ==
Strengthening of the masonry structure is required as a first step in the monastery general conservation, as well as protecting and restoring the interior painting in the monastery church.

After two centuries of almost complete absence of monastic life, the nuns of the Baia de Aramă Monastery strive to raise its prestige in both spiritual and artistic levels. While providing for themselves a monastic context to support their spiritual life, the monastery also offers a monument to medieval art, expected to draw devotees and tourists from home and abroad.

== Gallery ==
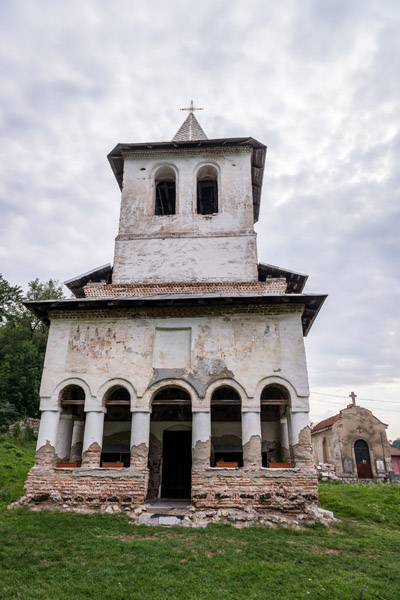
The church, as seen from the front.

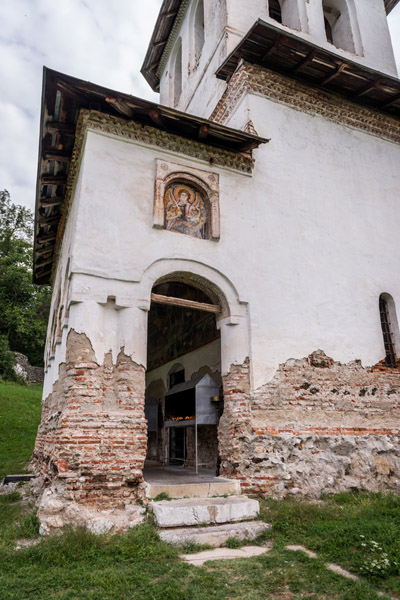
View of its southern side.

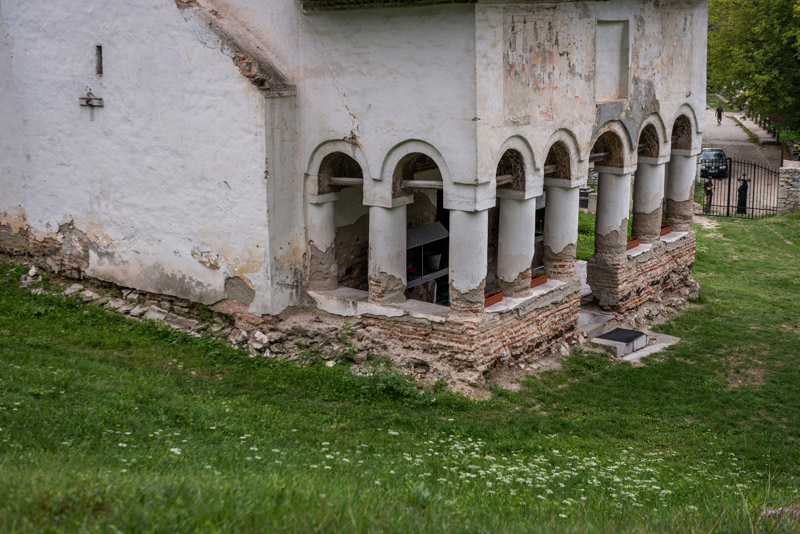
North-west view.

Fresco of the founder Župan Milko, županitsa Mara, and their sons at Baia de Arama monastery

Co-founder Konstantin Brankovic at Baia de Arama monastery

The founder’s Cyrillic inscription of zupan Milko at Baia de Arama Monastery

== Bibliography ==
- Vasile Drăguț: Dicționar enciclopedic de artă medievală românească, București 2000.
