= Șișești =

Şişeşti may refer to several places in Romania:

- Șișești, Mehedinți, a commune in Mehedinţi County
- Șișești, Maramureș, a commune in Maramureș County

and to:

- Gheorghe Ionescu-Sisești, agronomer
- Nicolae Ionescu-Sisești, neurologist
