= Peșteana =

Peșteana may refer to several places in Romania:

- Peșteana, a village in Densuș Commune, Hunedoara County
- Peșteana, a village in Florești Commune, Mehedinți County
- Peșteana de Jos, a village in Fărcășești Commune, Gorj County
- Peșteana-Jiu, a village in Bâlteni Commune, Gorj County
- Peșteana-Vulcan, a village in Ciuperceni Commune, Gorj County
- Peșteana (Tismana), a tributary of the Tismana in Gorj County
- Peșteana (Motru), a tributary of the Motru in Mehedinți County
- Peșteana (Olteț), a tributary of the Olteț in Vâlcea County
