= Dalma =

Dalma may refer to:

== People and fictional characters ==
- Dalma (name), a list of people and a fictional character with the given name, surname or stage name

== Places ==
=== Australia ===
- Dalma, Queensland, a locality in the Rockhampton Region

=== India ===
- Dalma Hills, near the industrial city of Jamshedpur in Jharkhand, eastern India
- Dalma Wildlife Sanctuary, in eastern India

=== Romania ===
- Dâlma, a village in Scorțoasa Commune, Buzău County
- Dâlma, a village in Bala, Mehedinți

=== United Arab Emirates ===
- Dalma Island, off the coast of Abu Dhabi
  - Dalma Airport

== Other uses ==
- Dalma Mall, Abu Dhabi
- Dalma Garden Mall, Yerevan, Armenia, a shopping mall
- Dalma (dish), a dish from Odia cuisine
- Dalma culture, archeological culture in northwestern Iran

== See also ==
- Delma (disambiguation)
