= Coșuștea Mică =

- Location within Romania

Location
- Country: Romania
- Counties: Mehedinți County
- Villages: Bâlvăneștii de Jos, Crăguești, Cocorova

Physical characteristics
- Mouth: Coșuștea
  - coordinates: 44.7492°N 22.8732°E
- Length: 25 km (16 mi)
- Basin size: 64 km^{2} (25 sq mi)

Basin features
- Progression: Coșuștea→ Motru→ Jiu→ Danube→ Black Sea

The Coșuștea Mică is a right tributary of the river Coșuștea in Romania. It flows into the Coșuștea in Ciovârnășani. Its length is 25 km (16 mi) and its basin size is 64 km^{2} (25 sq mi).
