= Dâlma =

Dâlma may refer to several villages in Romania:

- Dâlma, a village in Scorțoasa Commune, Buzău County, Romania
- Dâlma, a village in Bala, Mehedinți, Romania

== See also ==
- Dalma (disambiguation)
