= Ploștina =

Ploștina may refer to several places in Romania:

- Ploștina, a village in Lopătari Commune, Buzău County
- Ploștina, a village in Melinești Commune, Dolj County
- Ploștina, a village in the town of Motru, Gorj County
- Ploștina, a village in Vrâncioaia Commune, Vrancea County
- Ploștina (river), a tributary of the river Motru in Gorj County
- Ploștina, a tributary of the river Amaradia in Dolj County
