= Hușnița =

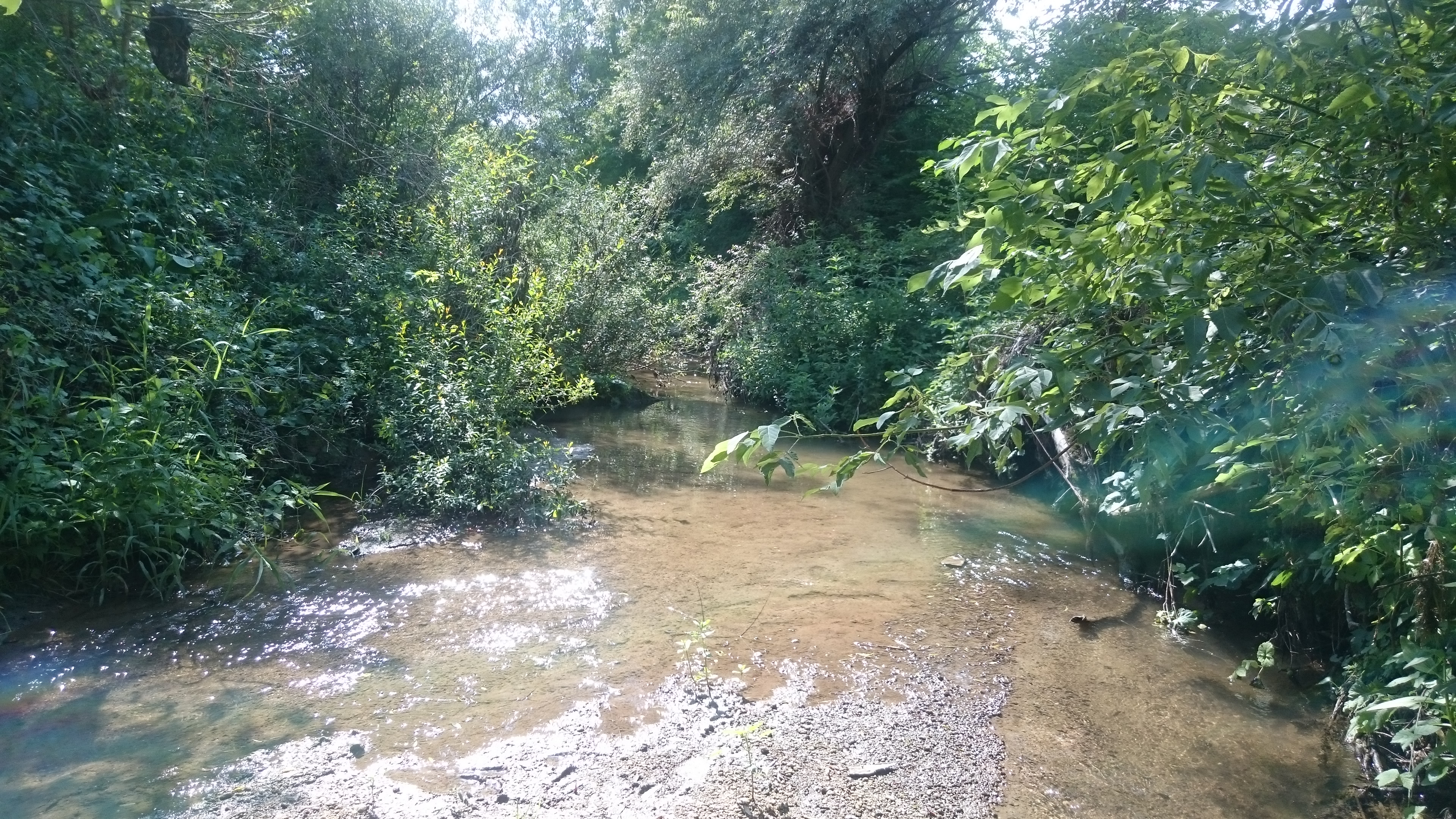

- Location within Romania

Location
- Country: Romania
- Counties: Mehedinți County
- Villages: Selișteni, Prunișor, Valea Ursului, Ciochiuța

Physical characteristics
- Mouth: Motru
  - location: Strehaia
  - coordinates: 44.6273°N 23.2180°E
- Length: 47 km (29 mi)
- Basin size: 311 km^{2} (120 sq mi)

Basin features
- Progression: Motru→ Jiu→ Danube→ Black Sea
- Tributaries
  - left: Hușnicioara, Cervenița
  - right: Zegaia, Ghelmegioaia, Gârnița, Peșteana

The Hușnița is a right tributary of the river Motru in Romania. It discharges into the Motru in Strehaia. Its length is 47 km (29 mi) and its basin size is 311 km^{2} (120 sq mi).
