= Crainici =

- Location within Romania

Location
- Country: Romania
- Counties: Mehedinți County
- Villages: Crainici

Physical characteristics
- Mouth: Motru
  - coordinates: 44.8440°N 22.8970°E
- Length: 19 km (12 mi)
- Basin size: 198 km^{2} (76 sq mi)

Basin features
- Progression: Motru→ Jiu→ Danube→ Black Sea
- Tributaries
  - right: Valea Mare, Iupca, Ohaba

The Crainici is a right tributary of the river Motru in Romania. It discharges into the Motru in Dealu Viilor. Its length is 19 km (12 mi) and its basin size is 198 km^{2} (76 sq mi).
