= Delma (disambiguation) =

Delma is a lizard genus. It may also refer to:

- Delma (given name), a list of people with the given name or nickname
- Nicole Delma, a contestant on Survivor: Pearl Islands, a reality television series
- MY Delma, a superyacht
- alternate spelling of Dalma Island and Dalma Airport, Abu Dhabi

== See also ==
- Delmas (disambiguation)
- Dalma (disambiguation)
