= Lupoaia =

Lupoaia may refer to several places in Romania:

- Lupoaia, a village in Holod Commune, Bihor County
- Lupoaia, a village in Cătunele Commune, Gorj County
- Lupoaia, a village in Creaca Commune, Sălaj County
- Lupoaia, a village in Pesceana Commune, Vâlcea County
- Lupoaia, a village in Dumitrești Commune, Vrancea County
- Lupoaia (Motru), a tributary of the Motru in Gorj County
- Lupoaia, a tributary of the Suciu in Maramureș County

== See also ==
- Lupu (disambiguation)
- Lupșa (disambiguation)
- Lupești (disambiguation)
