= Hușnicioara =

- Location within Romania

Location
- Country: Romania
- Counties: Mehedinți County
- Villages: Priboiești, Husnicioara

Physical characteristics
- Mouth: Hușnița
  - location: Selișteni
  - coordinates: 44.6559°N 22.8627°E
- Length: 9 km (5.6 mi)
- Basin size: 11 km^{2} (4.2 sq mi)

Basin features
- Progression: Hușnița→ Motru→ Jiu→ Danube→ Black Sea

The Hușnicioara is a left tributary of the river Hușnița in Romania. It flows into the Hușnița near Selișteni. Its length is 9 km (5.6 mi) and its basin size is 11 km^{2} (4.2 sq mi).
