= Slătinic =

- Location within Romania

Location
- Country: Romania
- Counties: Mehedinți County
- Villages: Colareț, Greci, Slătinicu Mare

Physical characteristics
- Mouth: Motru
  - location: Downstream of Strehaia
  - coordinates: 44.6194°N 23.2348°E
- Length: 22 km (14 mi)
- Basin size: 49 km^{2} (19 sq mi)

Basin features
- Progression: Motru→ Jiu→ Danube→ Black Sea

The Slătinic is a right tributary of the river Motru in Romania. It flows into the Motru at Lunca Banului, near Strehaia. Its length is 22 km (14 mi) and its basin size is 49 km^{2} (19 sq mi).
