= Leon Birnbaum =

Romanian mathematician and philosopher

Leon Birnbaum (1918–2010) was a Romanian mathematician and philosopher.

He was born in Chernovtsy (now Ukraine) on June 18, 1918 to a family with an intellectual tradition. He studied at the Orthodox High School, then at the Faculty of Mathematics. In 1941, Birnbaum was deported to Magilev-Podolsk in Transnistria when the war reached Chernovtsy. He remained there until 1944.

In 1946 he became a mathematics teacher in Strehaia, Romania, then at Turnu Severin and Dej. Meanwhile, he obtained a degree in Russian Language and Literature, and an engineering license in Machine Technology. Encouraged by friends, Birnbaum began to publish Mathematical articles in the journals "Mathematical Studies and Research" of Bucharest, "Notre Dame Journal of Formal Logics" in the USA and many others.

He was a member of the "Association Internationale de Cybernetique" in Namur, Belgium and a member of the Editorial Board of the magazine "Informatica", in Ljubljana. He was also a member of ASTRA.

== Books ==
- An Introduction to Logosophy, Litera, Bucharest, 1983.
- Multa et Multum, Litera, Bucharest, 1984.
- An Essay on a Finite Ontology, Aletheia, Bistrita, 1999.
- Tripolar Algebra and Elements of Quadripolar Algebra, Aletheia, Bistrita, 2000.
- A Finite Cosmology and Matters of Theosophy and of the Axiomatic, Aletheia, Bistrita, 2001.
- An Introduction to Aletheutics, Aletheia, Bistrita, 2001.
- Theatre, Aletheia, Bistrita, 2001.
