= Coșuștea =

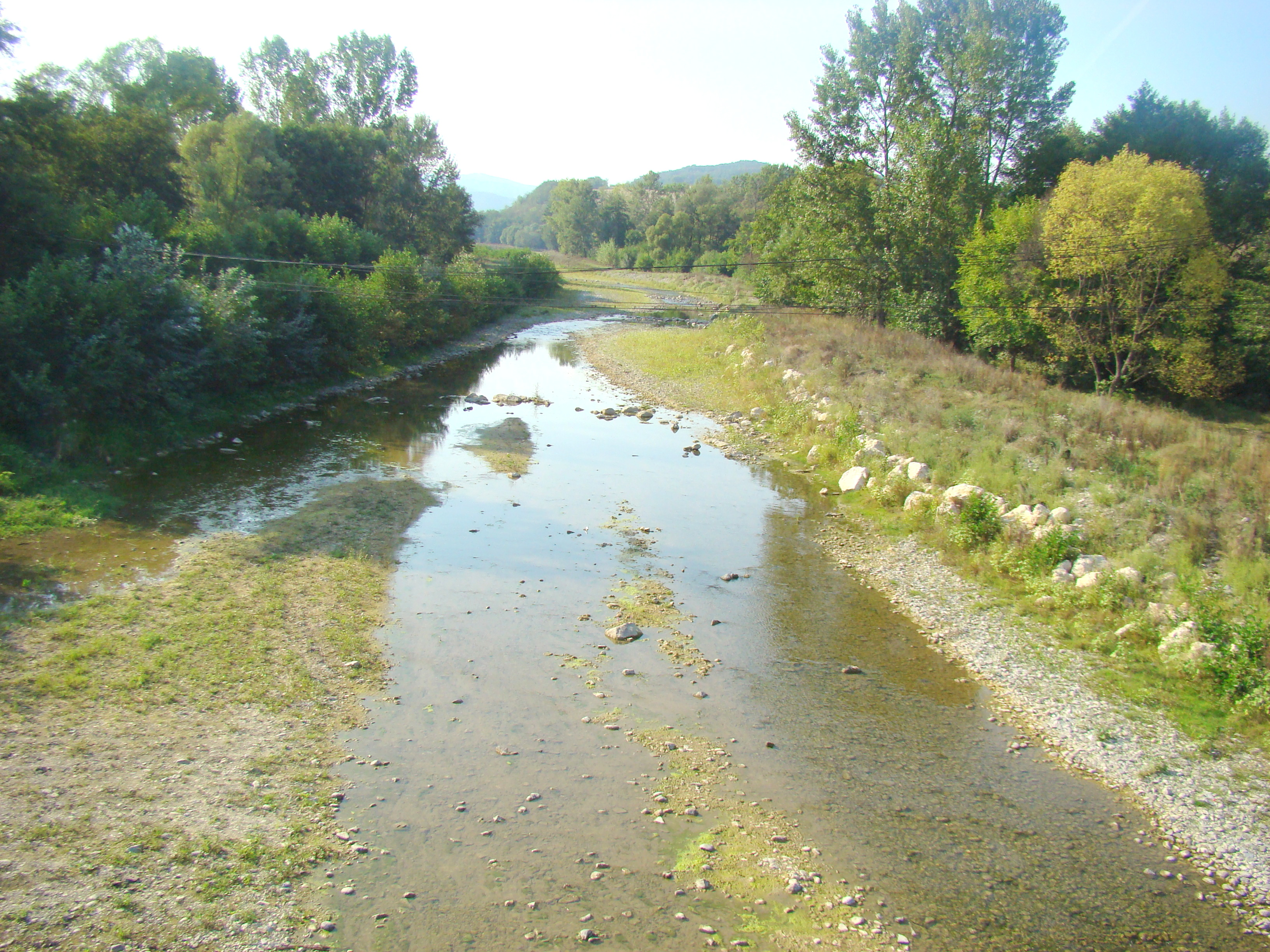

- Location within Romania

Location
- Country: Romania
- Counties: Mehedinți County
- Villages: Isverna, Ilovăț, Șișești, Căzăneşti, Corcova

Physical characteristics
- Mouth: Motru
  - coordinates: 44.6951°N 23.0903°E
- Length: 75 km (47 mi)
- Basin size: 437 km^{2} (169 sq mi)

Basin features
- Progression: Motru→ Jiu→ Danube→ Black Sea
- Tributaries
  - left: Valea Verde
  - right: Coșuștea Mică, Gârbovăț, Govodarva

The Coșuștea is a right tributary of the river Motru in Romania. It discharges into the Motru near Stejaru. Its length is 75 km (47 mi) and its basin size is 437 km^{2} (169 sq mi).
