= Zegujani oil field =

Oil field in Romania

Zegujani
- Country: Romania
- Region: Mehedinți County
- Offshore/onshore: onshore
- Operator: Rompetrol

Field history
- Discovery: 2005
- Start of development: 2005
- Start of production: 2008

Production
- Current production of oil: 500 barrels per day (~25,000 t/a)
- Estimated oil in place: 2.7 million tonnes (~ 3×10^{6} m^{3} or 20 million bbl)

The Zegujani oil field in Florești, Mehedinți County, Romania, was discovered in 2005 and developed by Rompetrol. It began production in 2008. Its total proven reserves are around 20 million barrels (2.7 million tonnes), and production is centered on 500 barrels per day (79 m^{3}/d). It has a total surface of 1.800 square kilometres.
