= Lupoaia (Motru) =

- Location within Romania

Location
- Country: Romania
- Counties: Gorj County
- Villages: Lupoița, Lupoaia

Physical characteristics
- Mouth: Motru
  - coordinates: 44.8022°N 22.9491°E
- Length: 10 km (6.2 mi)
- Basin size: 16 km^{2} (6.2 sq mi)

Basin features
- Progression: Motru→ Jiu→ Danube→ Black Sea
- River code: VII.1.36.5

The Lupoaia is a left tributary of the river Motru in Romania. It flows into the Motru near the village Lupoaia. Its length is 10 km (6.2 mi) and its basin size is 16 km^{2} (6.2 sq mi).
