= Gabriel Cruceru =

Romanian footballer

Personal information
- Date of birth: 6 June 1989 (age 37)
- Place of birth: Motru, Romania
- Height: 1.74 m (5 ft 9 in)
- Position: Right back

Youth career
- Minerul Motru
- ȘF Gică Popescu
- Jiul Petroșani

Senior career*
Years	Team	Apps	(Gls)
2007–2009	Jiul Petroșani	47	(4)
2009–2010	Gloria Buzău	26	(2)
2010	Gaz Metan Mediaș	2	(0)
2011–2012	Ceahlăul Piatra Neamț	4	(0)
2012	Voința Sibiu	22	(3)
2013	Râmnicu Vâlcea	24	(1)
2013–2014	FC U Craiova	21	(0)
Total		154	(11)
- * Club domestic league appearances and goals as of 13:11, 23 June 2021 (UTC)

Gabriel Cruceru (born 6 June 1989) is a Romanian former footballer who played as a right back for teams such as Jiul Petroșani, Ceahlăul Piatra Neamț, FC U Craiova or Minerul Motru, among others.
