= Motru =

- Municipality
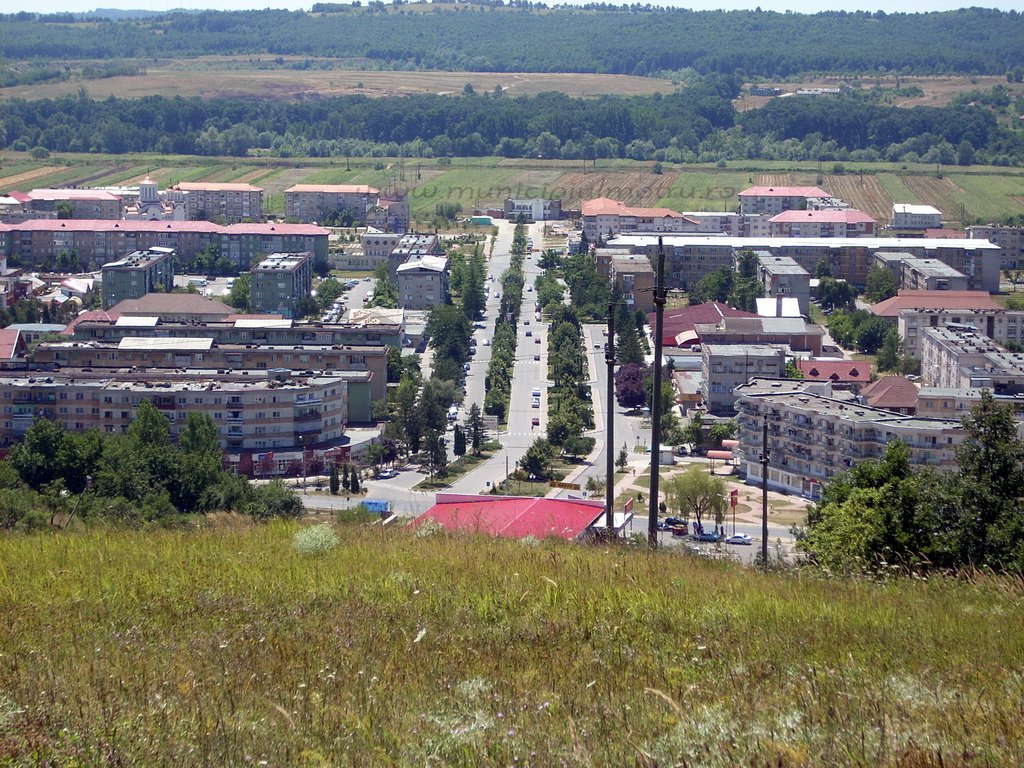
- View over the city from Motru Hills

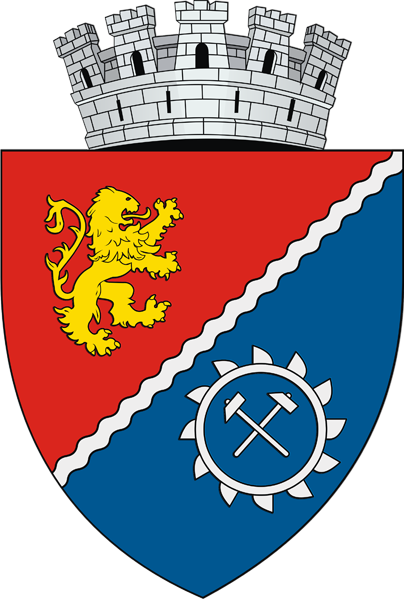
- Coat of arms

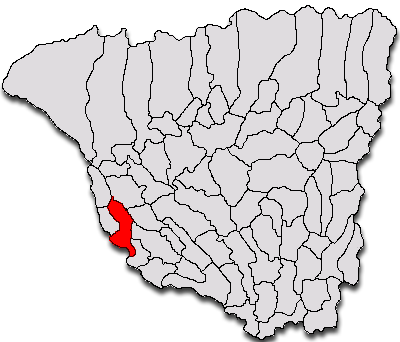
- Location in Gorj County

- Location in Romania
- Coordinates: 44°48′13″N 22°58′15″E
- Country: Romania
- County: Gorj

Government
  - Mayor (2024–2028): Costel-Cosmin Morega (PSD)
- Area: 50.09 km^{2} (19.34 sq mi)
- Elevation: 185 m (607 ft)
- Population (2021-12-01): 15,950
  - Density: 318.4/km^{2} (824.7/sq mi)
- Time zone: UTC+02:00 (EET)
  - Summer (DST): UTC+03:00 (EEST)
- Postal code: 215200
- Area code: (+40) 02 53
- Vehicle reg.: GJ
- Website: www.primariamotru.ro

Motru (Romanian pronunciation: [ˈmotru]) is a city in Romania, Gorj County. It is situated on the river Motru and its tributary, the river Ploștina, in western Oltenia. The county capital Târgu Jiu is located about 35 km (22 mi) northeast. The city administers eight villages: Dealu Pomilor, Horăști, Însurăței, Leurda, Lupoița, Ploștina, Roșiuța, and Râpa.

== History ==
Historical population
| Year | Pop. | ±% |
|---|---|---|
| 1977 | 15,998 | — |
| 1992 | 26,626 | +66.4% |
| 2002 | 25,860 | −2.9% |
| 2011 | 18,142 | −29.8% |
| 2021 | 15,950 | −12.1% |
Source: Census data

The region has been inhabited since at least the time of the Roman Empire, attested by the discovery of some silver coins from the era of Emperor Septimius Severus (193–211) in Leurda in 1964.

The Dacian town Amutria is also mentioned in ancient sources like Ptolemy's Geographia (c. 150 AD) and Tabula Peutingeriana (2nd century AD), and potentially placed here. The name is homonymous with the ancient name of the Motru River. After the Roman conquest of Dacia, Amutria was part of an important road network, between Drubetis and Pelendava. A settlement and a Roman castrum were discovered in archeological digs near the village of Valea Perilor in the Cătunele commune, close to the road between Motru and Baia de Aramă. The Roman road connecting to Drobeta on the Motru valley was also identified in Cătunele.

The oldest documented settlement in the territory of the present-day city is Ploștina (mentioned as Ploștină in the charters granted to Tismana in 1385 and 1444). Until 1863, the village belonged to the estate of the Tismana monastery with the monks collecting the tithe from the land. From 1863 on, the estate was administered by the state. For three years, the estate was also leased to Tudor Vladimirescu, and the inhabitants of this area participated in the uprising of 1821 as well.

Two villages incorporated into the present-day city, Roșiuța and Lupoița, were inhabited by free farmers who owned their own plots of land.

=== Present ===
The present city of Motru was established by an administrative decision on 24 May 1966 on the territory of the former Ploștina commune. Seven other villages became part of the new city. The reason behind the decision was the development of several coal deposits. Motru was declared a municipiu in 2000. Mining is the city's main industry; agriculture and livestock are also important, especially in its attached villages.

In 1981, Motru was the site of riots from miners who were working in the mines of the city. The riots, which took place between 17 and 19 October of that year, were triggered by poor work conditions, tight control of legislative organizations and the general exhaustion of the miners, further exacerbated by a decree that limited consumption of bread only to the dwellers of the city. During the riots, Emil Bobu visited the city, where he was attacked by angry crowds with potatoes; when he returned to Bucharest, he ordered the army to intervene in the city after 2 days of protests from the local populace. At the time, the inexpensive Motru bread attracted many workers and farmers into the city, who carried the bread loafs in sacks and arrived in the town by local trains known as "trains of hunger". Nowadays the bread factory is in ruins.

== Demography ==
According to the 2021 census, Motru had a population of 15,950 of which 13,626 Romanians, 14 Hungarians, 107 Roma, 4 Italians, and 7 of other ethnicity. In 2011, the population was 18,142, including 17,988 Romanians, 38 Hungarians, 83 Roma, and 3 Germans.

== Transportation ==
Motru is the terminus of a railway line that branches off the CFR main line Bucharest–Craiova–Lugoj at Strehaia, which was put into operation in 1962. In addition, there are bus connections with the county seat of Târgu Jiu. Motru is on the National Road DN67 from Drobeta-Turnu Severin to Râmnicu Vâlcea.

== Natives ==
- Gabriel Cruceru (born 1989), footballer
- Dorel Mutică (born 1973), footballer

== Gallery ==
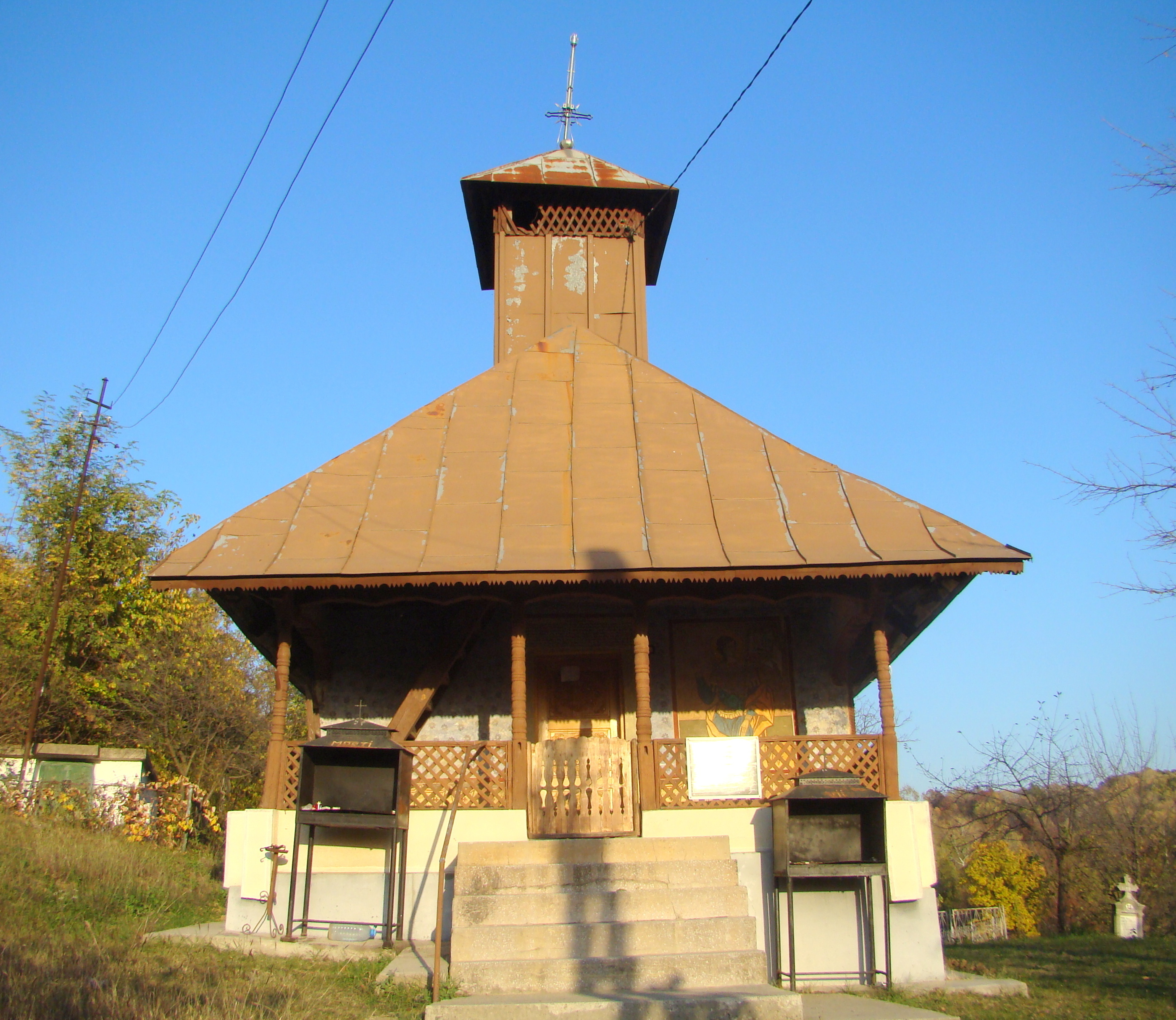
Wooden church in Horăști

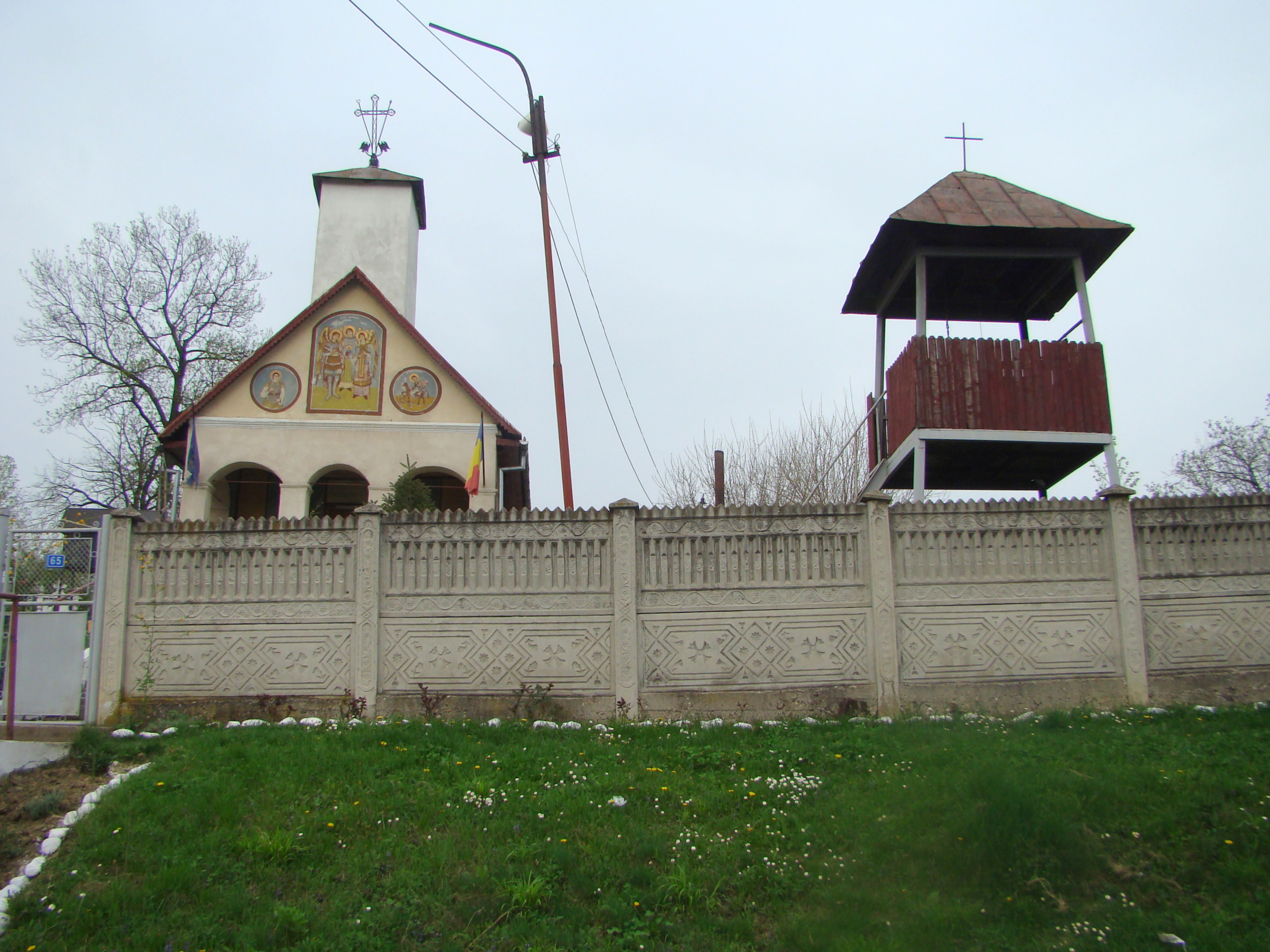
Wooden church in Leurda

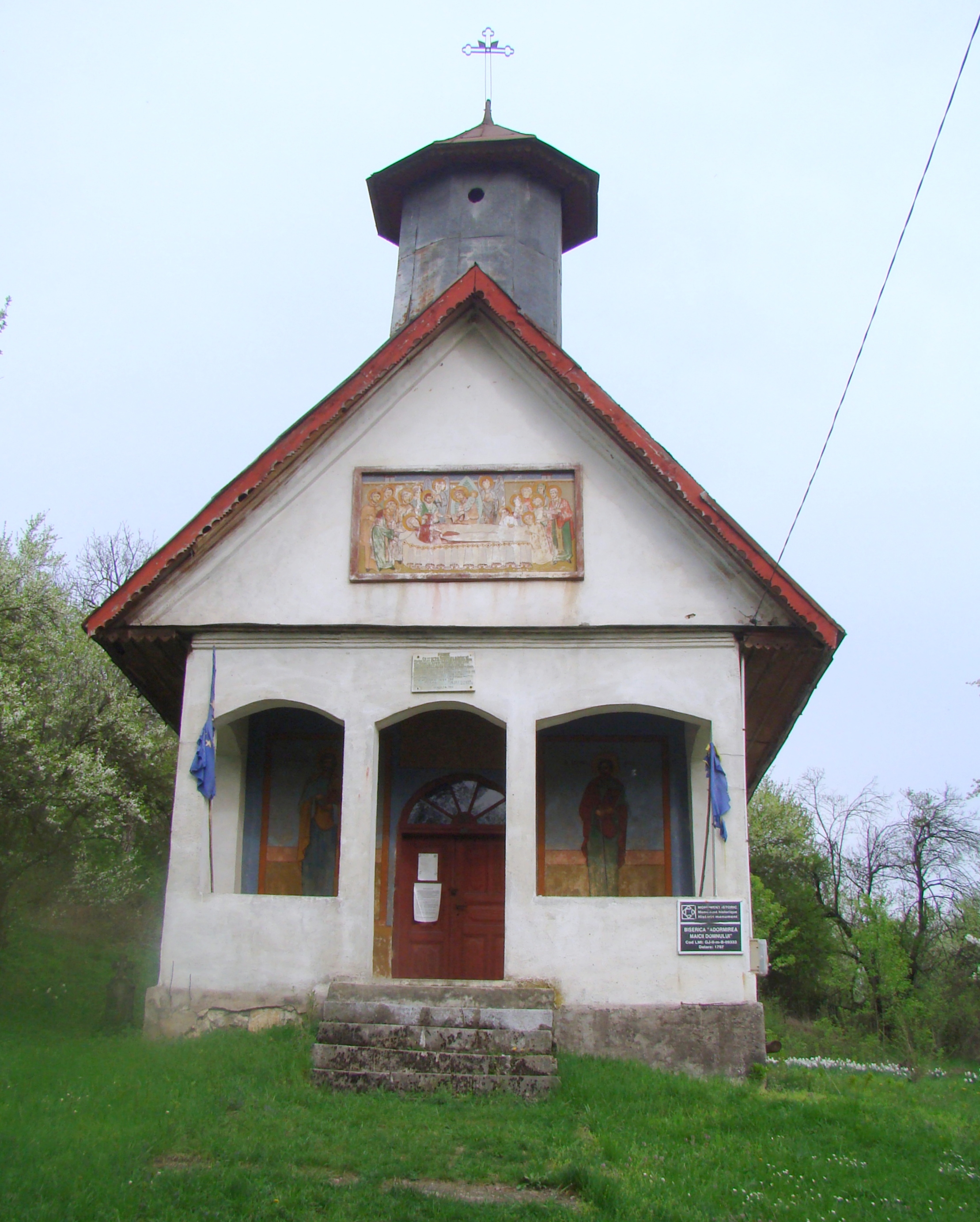
Church of the Dormition in Lupoița

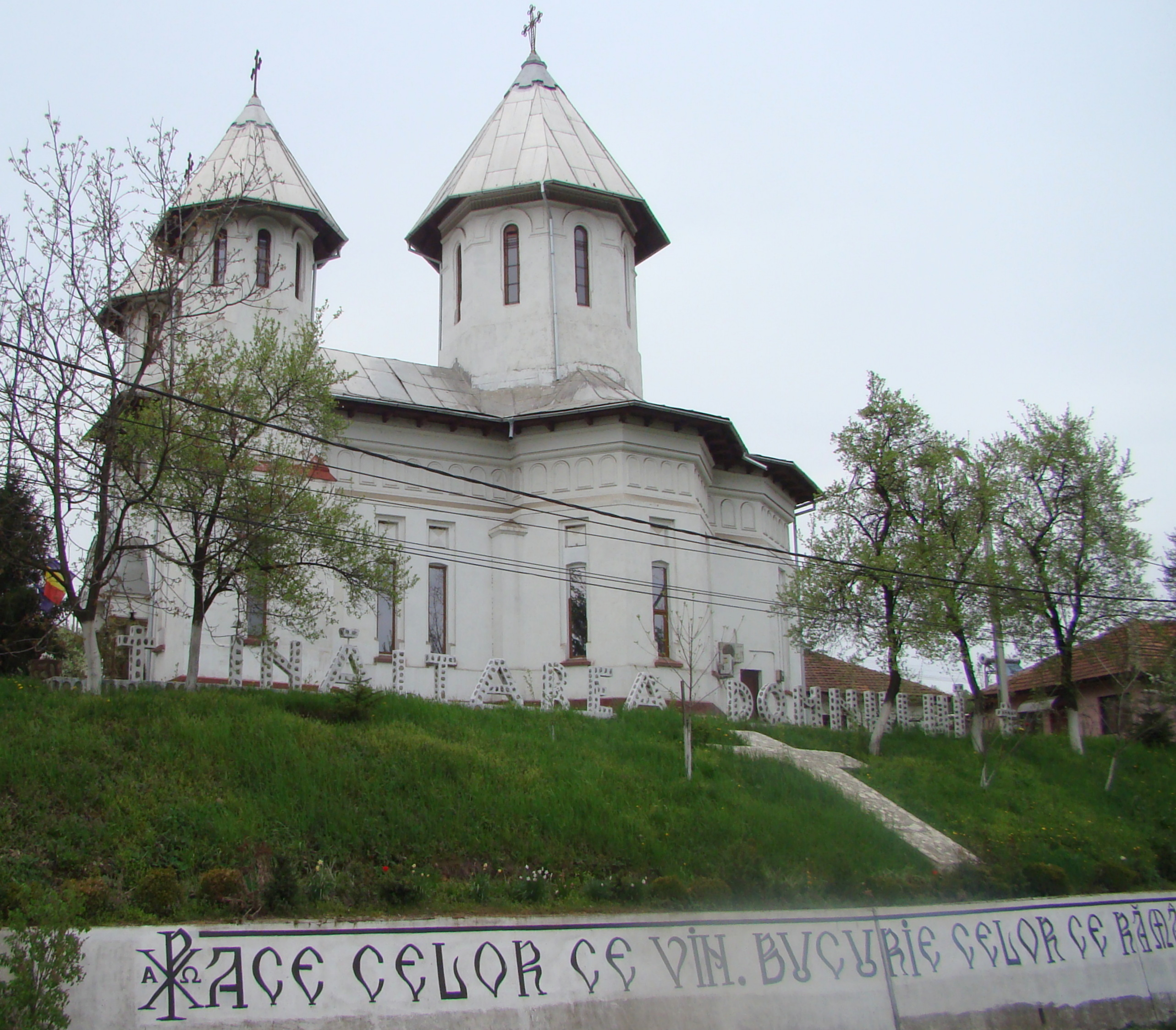
Church in Roșiuța

== See also ==
- Motru Coal Mine

== Bibliography ==
- Schütte, Gudmund (1917). Ptolemy's maps of northern Europe: a reconstruction of the prototypes. Copenhagen: H. Hagerup.
