= Lupu =

Lupu may refer to:

- Lupu (surname)
- Lupu Bridge (卢浦大桥), spanning the Huangpu River in Shanghai, China.
- Lupu, Funing County, Jiangsu (芦蒲镇), town in Funing County, Jiangsu, China.
- Lupu, Yuhuan County, Zhejiang (芦浦镇), town in Yuhuan County, Zhejiang, China.
- Lupu River, a tributary of the river Râul Lung in Romania.
- Lupu, a village in Cergău Commune, Alba County, Romania.

== See also ==
- Lucid Puppy Linux
- Lupus
- Lupșa (disambiguation)
- Lupești (disambiguation)
- Lupoaia (disambiguation)
