= Motru (river) =

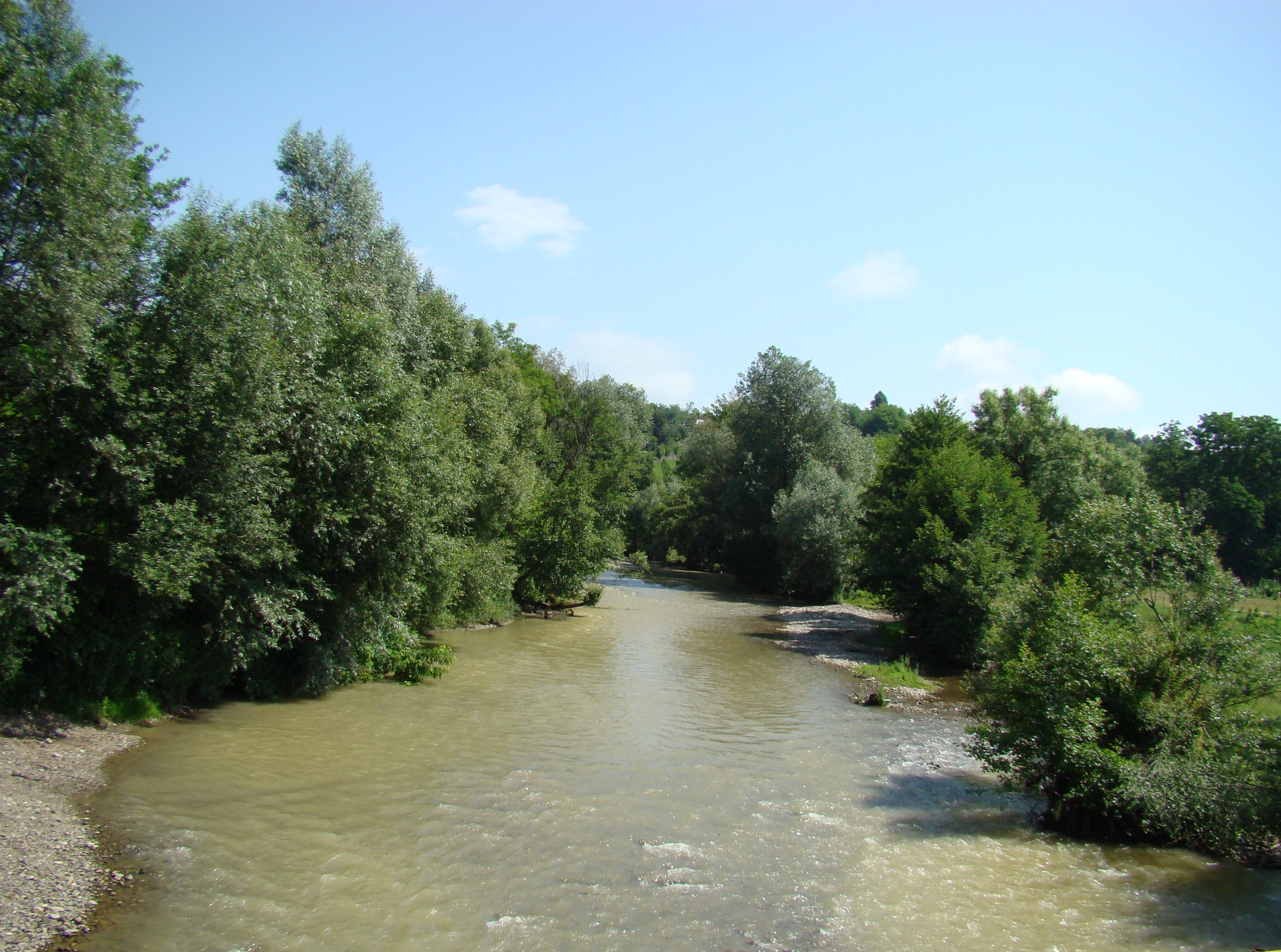
- Motru river at Negoiești, Mehedinți county

- Location within Romania

Location
- Country: Romania
- Counties: Gorj, Mehedinți
- Towns: Motru, Strehaia

Physical characteristics
- Mouth: Jiu
  - location: near Filiași
  - coordinates: 44°33′21″N 23°27′03″E
- Length: 139 km (86 mi)
- Basin size: 1,874 km^{2} (724 sq mi)

Basin features
- Progression: Jiu→ Danube→ Black Sea
- Tributaries
  - right: Coșuștea

The Motru is a right tributary of the river Jiu in Southwestern Romania. It discharges into the Jiu in Gura Motrului, near the town Filiași. Its length is 134 km (83 mi) and its hydrological basin size is 1,895 km^{2} (732 sq mi).

== Towns and villages ==
The following towns are situated along the river Motru, from source to mouth: Padeș, Cătunele, Motru, Broșteni, Strehaia, Butoiești

== Tributaries ==
The following rivers are tributaries to the river Motru (from source to mouth):

Left: Frumosu, Valea Râsului, Cărpinei, Valea Mare, Lupoaia, Ploștina, Stângăceaua

Right: Mileanu, Scărișoara, Motrul Sec, Brebina, Crainici, Peșteana, Lupșa, Coșuștea, Jirov, Cotoroaia, Hușnița, Slătinic, Tălăpan

== History ==
The ancient Dacian name of the river was Amutria, which is homonymous with a settlement in the area. The Dacian town of Amutria is mentioned in ancient sources like Ptolemy's Geographia (c. 150 AD) and Tabula Peutingeriana (2nd century AD), and placed around the river. After the Roman conquest of Dacia, Amutria was part of an important road network, between Drubetis and Pelendava.
