= Lupești =

Lupeşti may refer to:

- Lupeşti, a village in Vărădia de Mureș Commune, Arad County, Romania
- Lupeşti, a village in Mănăstirea Cașin Commune, Bacău County, Romania
- Lupeşti, a village in Mălușteni Commune, Vaslui County, Romania

== See also ==
- Lupu (disambiguation)
- Lupșa (disambiguation)
- Lupoaia (disambiguation)
