= Baia de Aramă mine =

Mine in Romania

- Location within Romania

Location
- Location: Baia de Aramă, Mehedinți County, Romania; 44°59′57.44″N 22°48′28.22″E

Production
- Products: Copper

History
- Opened: 1950
- Closed: 1997

Owner
- Company: Minbucovina

The Baia de Aramă mine was a large mine in the east of Romania in Mehedinți County close to Baia de Aramă. Baia de Aramă represents one of the largest copper reserve in Romania having estimated reserves of 16 million tonnes of ore grading 0.24% copper.
