= Motrul Sec =

- Location within Romania

Location
- Country: Romania
- Counties: Gorj County

Physical characteristics
- Mouth: Motru
  - coordinates: 45.0542°N 22.8020°E
- Length: 17 km (11 mi)
- Basin size: 81 km^{2} (31 sq mi)

Basin features
- Progression: Motru→ Jiu→ Danube→ Black Sea
- Tributaries
  - right: Capra, Motrușor
- River code: VII.1.36.2

The Motrul Sec is a right tributary of the river Motru in Romania. It flows into the Motru in the village Motru Sec. Its length is 17 km (11 mi) and its basin size is 81 km^{2} (31 sq mi).
