= Peșteana (Motru) =

Tributary of the river Motru in Romania

- Location within Romania

Location
- Country: Romania
- Counties: Mehedinți County
- Villages: Peștenuța, Peșteana, Moșneni, Florești, Broșteni

Physical characteristics
- Mouth: Motru
  - coordinates: 44.7524°N 23.0031°E
- Length: 22 km (14 mi)
- Basin size: 85 km^{2} (33 sq mi)

Basin features
- Progression: Motru→ Jiu→ Danube→ Black Sea
- Tributaries
  - right: Gârdoaia

The Peșteana is a right tributary of the river Motru in Romania. It flows into the Motru near Broșteni. Its length is 22 km (14 mi) and its basin size is 85 km^{2} (33 sq mi).
