= Lupșa (disambiguation) =

Lupșa is a commune in Alba County, Romania.

Lupșa may also refer to the following places in Romania:

- Lupșanu, a commune in Călărași County
- Lupșa, a village in Hoghiz Commune, Brașov County
- Lupșa de Jos and Lupșa de Sus, villages in Broșteni, Mehedinți County
- Lupșeni, a village in Galda de Jos Commune, Alba County
- Lupșa, a tributary of the Arieș in Alba County
- Lupșa (Olt), a tributary of the Olt in Brașov County

== See also ==
- Lupu (disambiguation)
- Lupești (disambiguation)
- Lupoaia (disambiguation)
