= Brebina (Motru) =

- Location within Romania

Location
- Country: Romania
- Counties: Mehedinți County
- Villages: Obârșia-Cloșani, Brebina, Baia de Aramă

Physical characteristics
- Mouth: Motru
  - coordinates: 44°59′33″N 22°51′07″E
  - elevation: 260 m (850 ft)
- Length: 20 km (12 mi)
- Basin size: 77 km^{2} (30 sq mi)

Basin features
- Progression: Motru→ Jiu→ Danube→ Black Sea
- Tributaries
  - right: Bulba
- River code: VII.1.36.3

The Brebina is a right tributary of the river Motru in Romania. It discharges into the Motru near Baia de Aramă. Its length is 20 km (12 mi) and its basin size is 77 km^{2} (30 sq mi).
