= Dalma (name) =

Dalma may refer to:

== Given name ==
- Dalma Gálfi (born 1998), Hungarian tennis player
- Dalma Iványi (born 1976), Hungarian basketball player
- Dalma Kovács (born 1985), Romanian pop/jazz singer
- Dalma Mádl (1932–2021), former First Lady of Hungary
- Dalma Malhas (born 1992), Saudi Arabian equestrian, first female Saudi Olympic competitor
- Dalma Pesti (born 2007), Hungarian rhythmic gymnast
- Dalma Ružičić-Benedek (born 1982), Hungarian-born Serbian sprint canoer
- Dalma Sebestyén (born 1997), Hungarian swimmer

== Other ==
- Rubi Dalma (1906–1994), Italian actress
- Sergio Dalma, stage name of Spanish singer Josep Sergi Capdevila Querol (born 1964)
- Tia Dalma, fictional character from the movie Pirates of the Caribbean: Dead Man's Chest
