= Gheorghe Ionescu-Sisești =

Romanian agronomer

Gheorghe Ionescu-Sisești (16 October 1885–4 June 1967) was a Romanian agronomer. He was elected titular member of the Romanian Academy in 1936, and he was Minister of Agriculture in 1938–1939.

He was born in Șișeștii de Jos, Mehedinți County, in the historical province of Oltenia, Romania. He obtained a Ph.D. in agronomy from the University of Jena, in Thuringia, Germany.
