= Baia de Aramă =

- Town
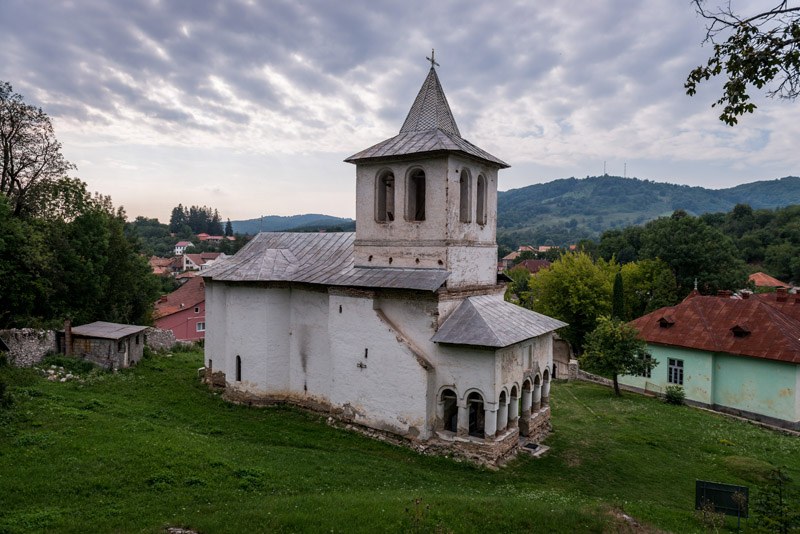
- Sfinții Voievozi Church at Baia de Aramă Monastery

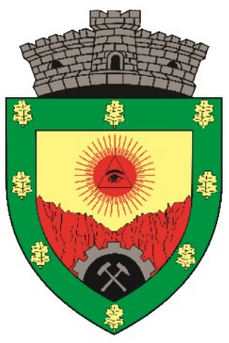
- Coat of arms

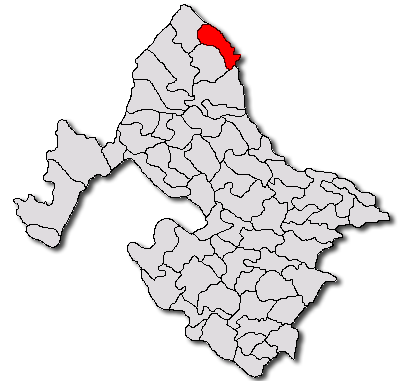
- Location in Mehedinți County

- Location in Romania
- Coordinates: 45°0′0″N 22°48′41″E
- Country: Romania
- County: Mehedinți

Government
  - Mayor (2024–2028): Ilie-Ion Tudorescu (PSD)
- Area: 91.11 km^{2} (35.18 sq mi)
- Elevation: 280 m (920 ft)
- Population (2021-12-01): 4,478
  - Density: 49.15/km^{2} (127.3/sq mi)
- Time zone: UTC+02:00 (EET)
  - Summer (DST): UTC+03:00 (EEST)
- Postal code: 225100
- Area code: (+40) 02 52
- Vehicle reg.: MH
- Website: www.primariabaiadearama.ro

Historical population
Year	Pop.	±%
1910	1,490	—
1930	1,461	−1.9%
1948	1,513	+3.6%
1977	4,899	+223.8%
1992	5,624	+14.8%
2002	5,724	+1.8%
2011	5,349	−6.6%
2021	4,478	−16.3%
Source: Census data

Baia de Aramă (Hungarian: Arámabánya) is a small Romanian town located in Mehedinți County, in the historical region of Oltenia, with a population of 4,478 as of 2021. Eight villages are administered by the town: Bratilovu, Brebina, Dealu Mare, Mărășești, Negoești, Pistrița, Stănești, and Titerlești.

The river Brebina runs through the town. Some Dacian ruins can be found in the town, as well as the 17th century Baia de Aramă Monastery. The name of the town means "copper mine", suggesting that Baia de Aramă was once a strong copper mining town. However, over the years, many of the mines in the town have closed, leaving roughly half the town unemployed.

== Natives ==
- Doru Popescu (1949–2023), footballer
- Ipolit Strâmbu (1871–1934), painter

== See also ==
- Baia de Aramă mine
