= Delma (given name) =

Delma is a given name and nickname which may refer to:

== Women ==
- Delma S. Arrigoitia (1945–2023), Puerto Rican historian, author, educator and lawyer
- Delma Byron (1913–2006), American dancer and actress
- Delma Gisu (born 1996), Australian rules footballer
- Delma Gonçalves (born 1975), also known as Pretinha, Brazilian football coach and former player
- Delma Zita (born 1998), Mozambican basketball player

== Men ==
- Delma Cowart (1941–2021), American stock car racing driver nicknamed "Delma"
- Delma Furniss (1934–2022), American politician
