= Ploștina (river) =

- Location within Romania

Location
- Country: Romania
- Counties: Gorj County

Physical characteristics
- Mouth: Motru
  - coordinates: 44.7863°N 22.9785°E
- Length: 13 km (8.1 mi)
- Basin size: 26 km^{2} (10 sq mi)

Basin features
- Progression: Motru→ Jiu→ Danube→ Black Sea

The Ploștina is a left tributary of the river Motru in Romania. It discharges into the Motru in the town Motru. Its length is 13 km (8.1 mi) and its basin size is 26 km^{2} (10 sq mi).
