= Dalma Mall =

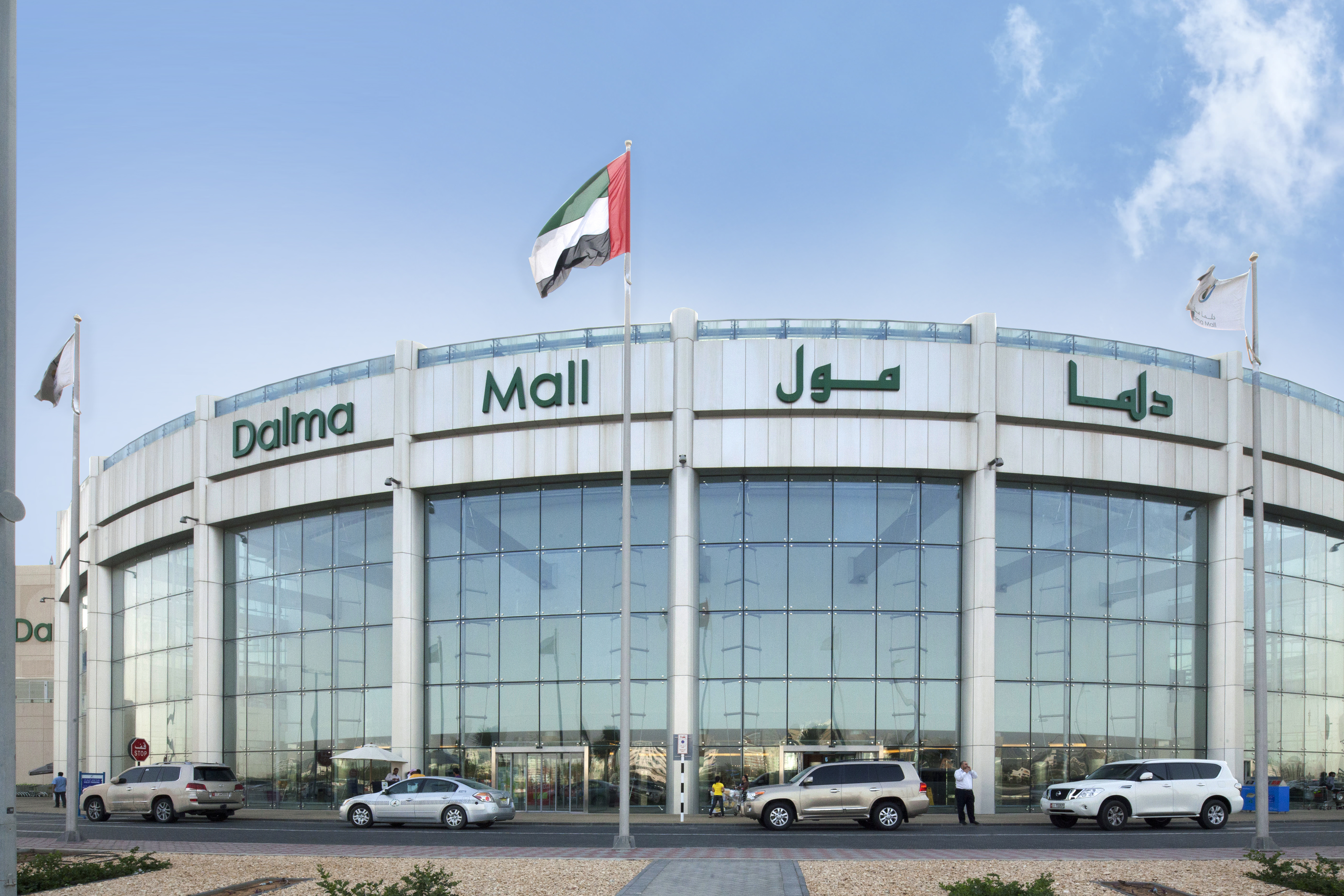
- Exterior of Dalma Mall
- Location: Abu Dhabi, United Arab Emirates
- Opened: 10 October 2010; 16 years ago
- Developer: The Developers LLC
- Manager: Bhupinder Singh (GM & CFO)
- Owner: The Developers LLC
- Num. of stores: 450+
- Num. of anchor tenants: 25 +
- Floor area: 255,000 sqm
- Floors: 3
- Parking: 6,300+
- Public transit: 600,000+
- Website: www.dalmamall.ae

Dalma Mall is a shopping mall located in Abu Dhabi, United Arab Emirates. The mall is prominently situated on the Abu Dhabi–Tarif–Al Ain highway, opposite Mohammed Bin Zayed City. A short distance from Maqta Bridge and Abu Dhabi International Airport, Dalma Mall features over 450 stores and kiosks. The mall opened on 10 October 2010.

== Description ==
Dalma Mall is part of the strategic plan of Abu Dhabi 2030 which sets out the framework of the Emirate's long-term growth. Market research has shown that the rapidly developing region surrounding Dalma Mall has evolved into a large multi-cultural, middle-class population, and the mall has fulfilled the requirements of the surrounding population.

== Construction ==
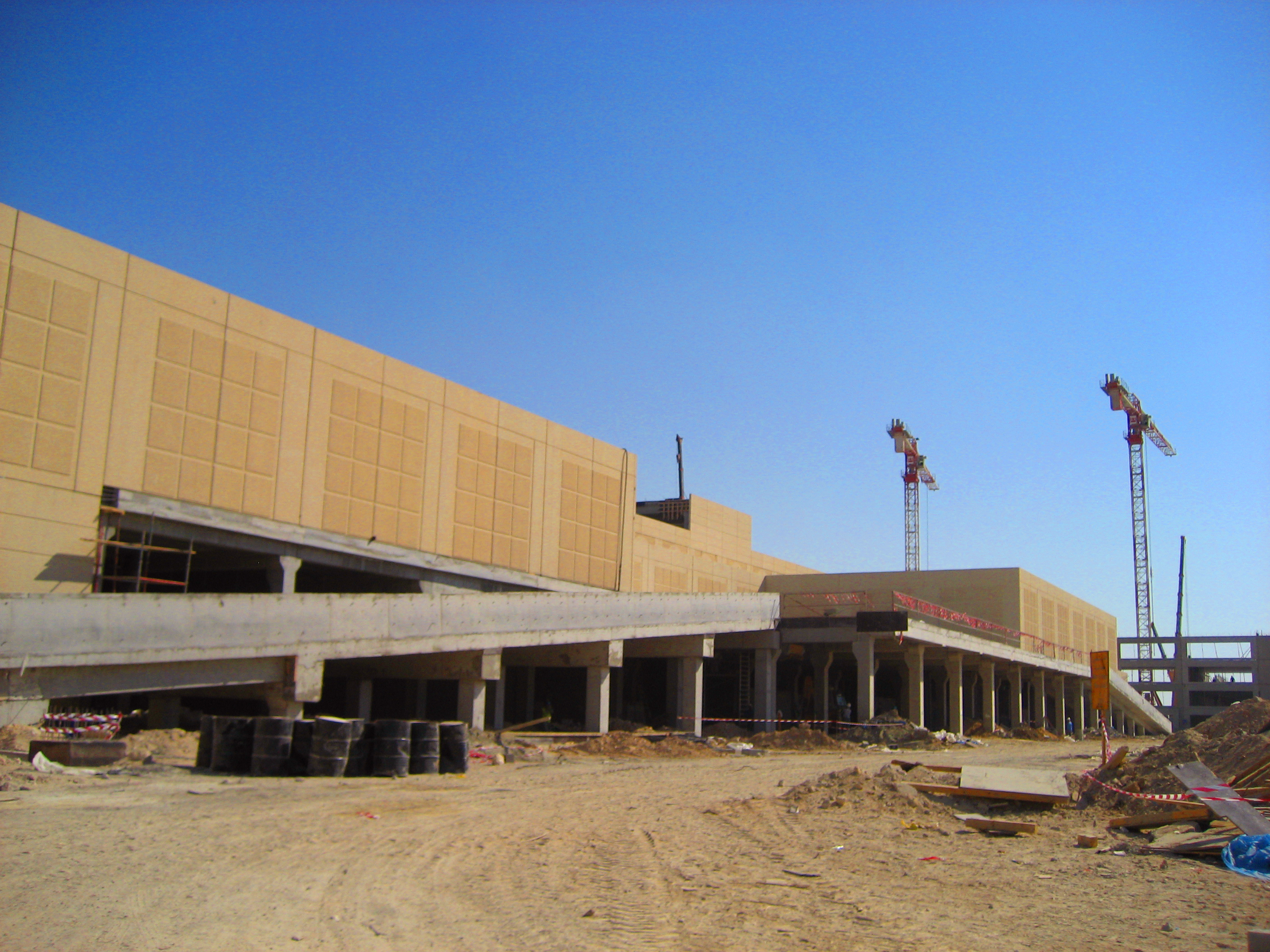
Dalma Mall under construction in 2008

Dalma Mall is owned by The Developers LLC. The mall has a total built-up area of 250,000 square metres and a total gross leasable area of 155,000 square meters. The mall which opened in 2010, features stores such as Carrefour, IKEA, Home Centre, Centrepoint and Marks & Spencer, H&M, 2XL, OC HOME, Emax, Fitness First, Albaik, Red Tag, Max Fashion, Matalan, Brand For Less, NEXT, Ecity and others.

== Entertainment ==
Visitors to Dalma Mall are able to experience a broad range of entertainment comprising a series of activities.

=== Fun City ===
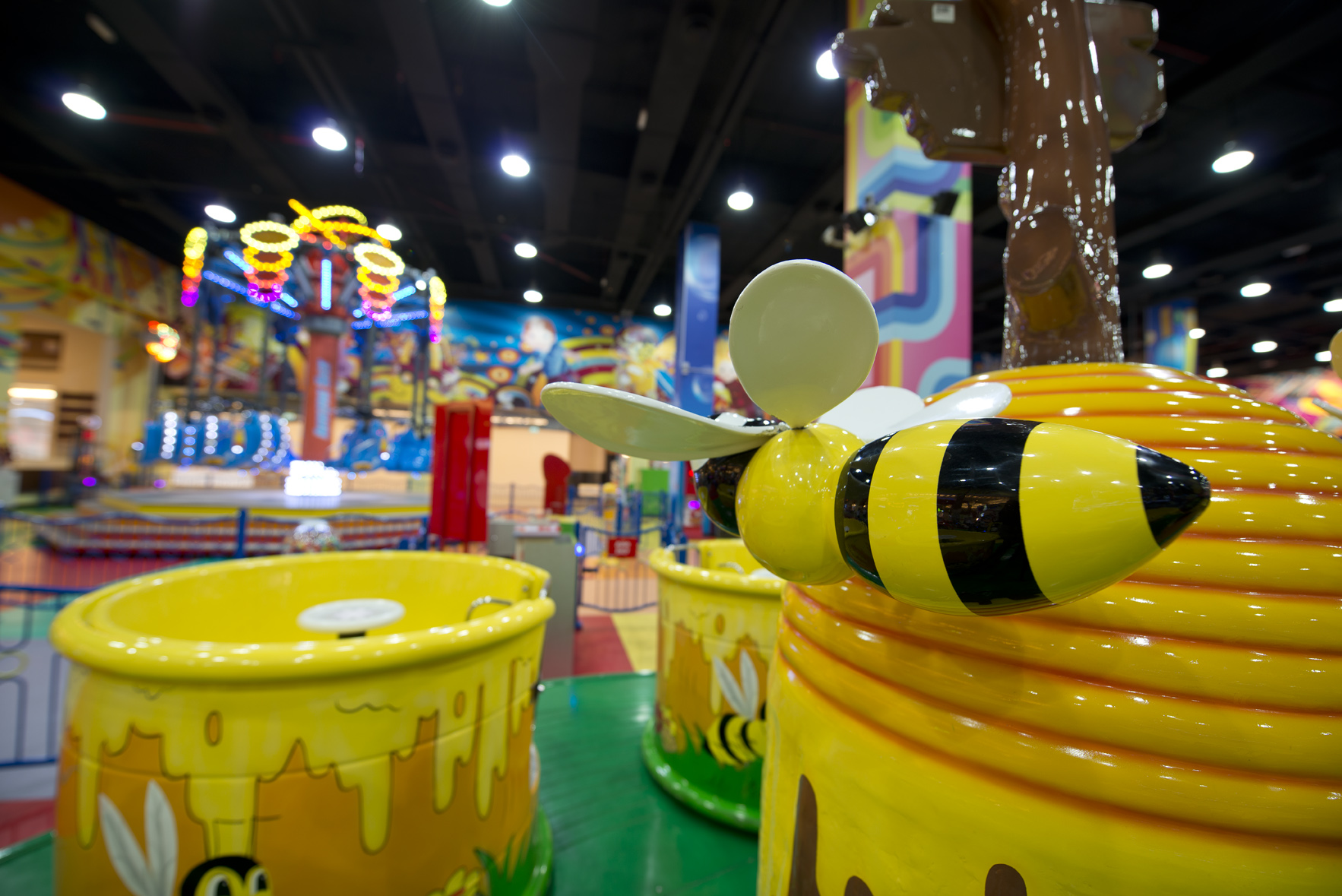
Fun City, level 2, Dalma Mall

Fun City is a play center for children between the ages of 1 and 12 years. Divided into age-appropriate areas, Fun n Learn is designed for children aged 0–4 and provides outlets for children's mental and physical development. PlayZone, the soft-play area meanwhile, provides a safe and secure place for children to play.

=== Cine Royal ===
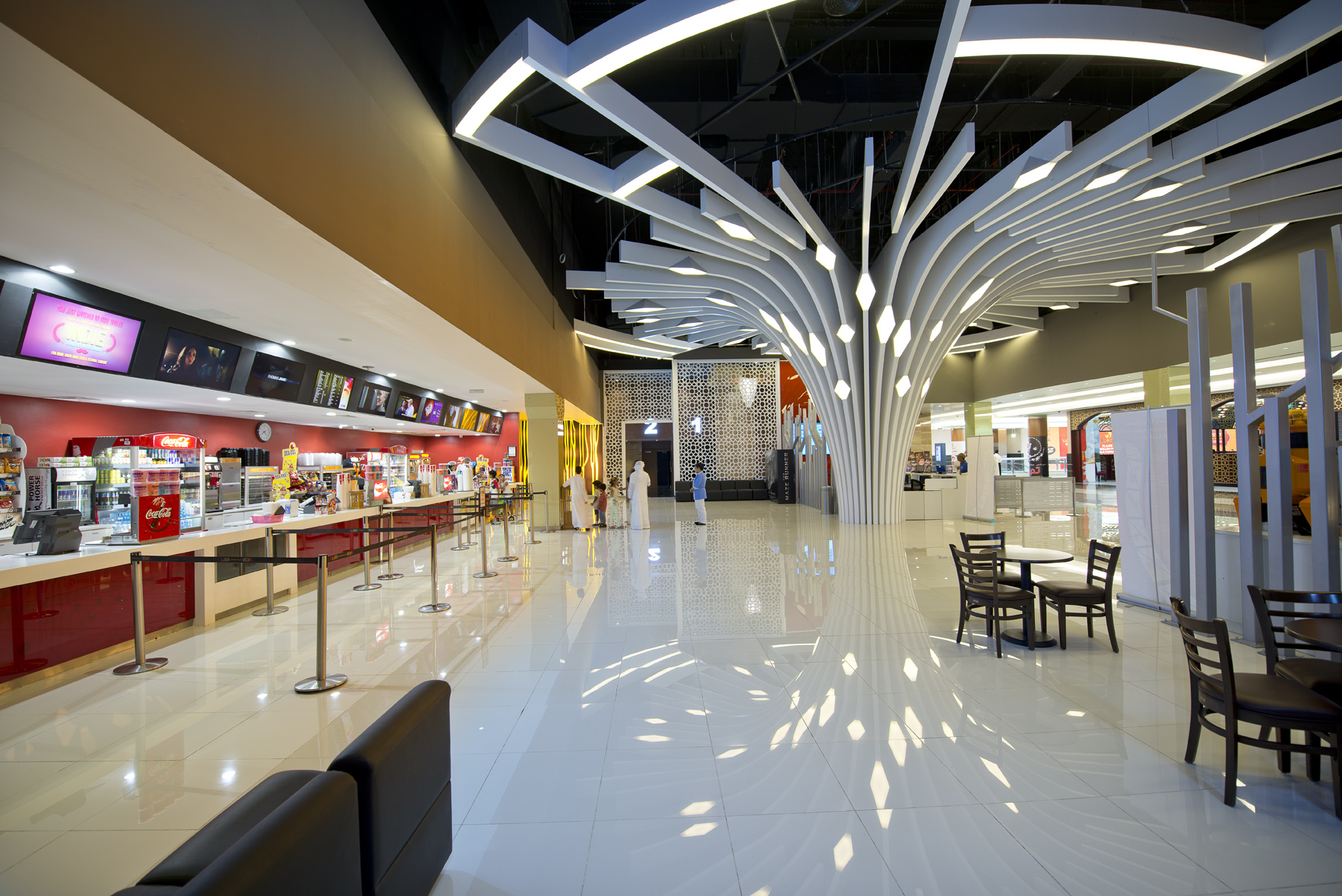
Cine Royal interior, level 2, Dalma Mall

Dalma Mall hosts Abu Dhabi's largest Cineplex, the 14-screen CineRoyal Cinemas. The cinema has 2,200 seats and a cine-going experience including VIP halls and 3D screening.

=== Adventure HQ ===
Adventure HQ is an outdoor adventure, sporting and fitness specialist offering equipment for a wide range of active lifestyle pursuits including fishing, diving, camping, hiking, cycling and water sports.

== Photo gallery ==
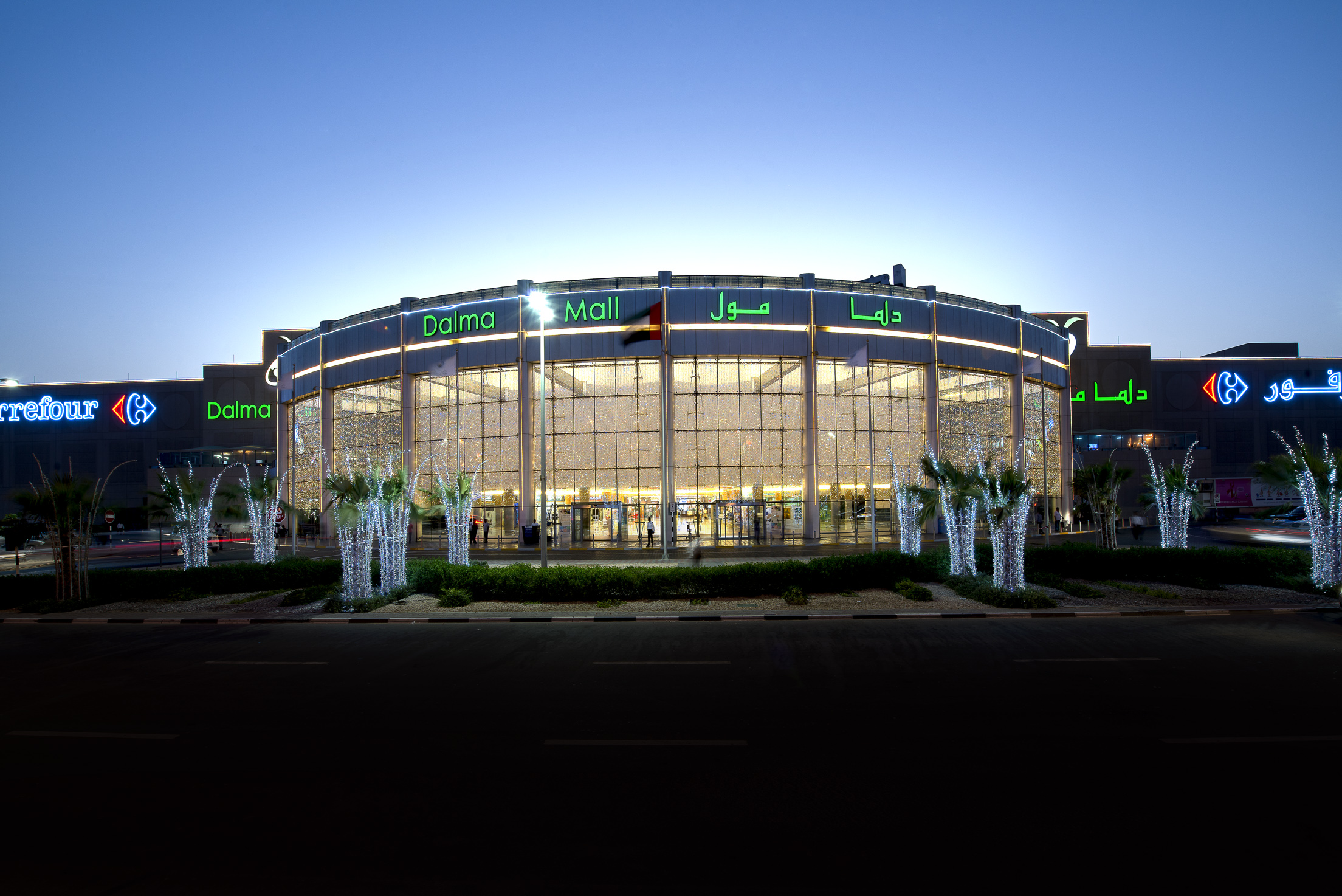
Dalma Mall exterior taken October 2014

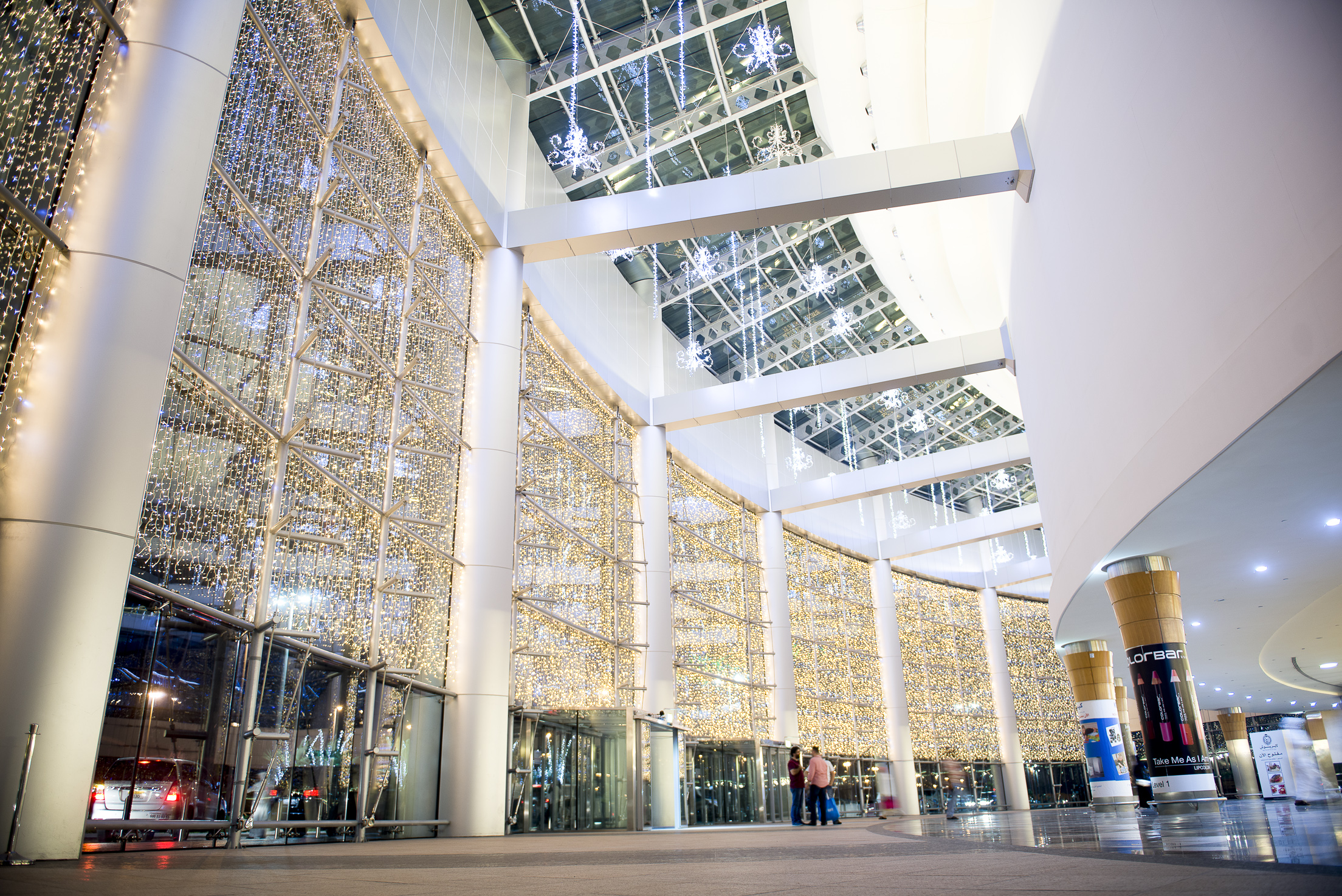
Dalma Mall main entrance

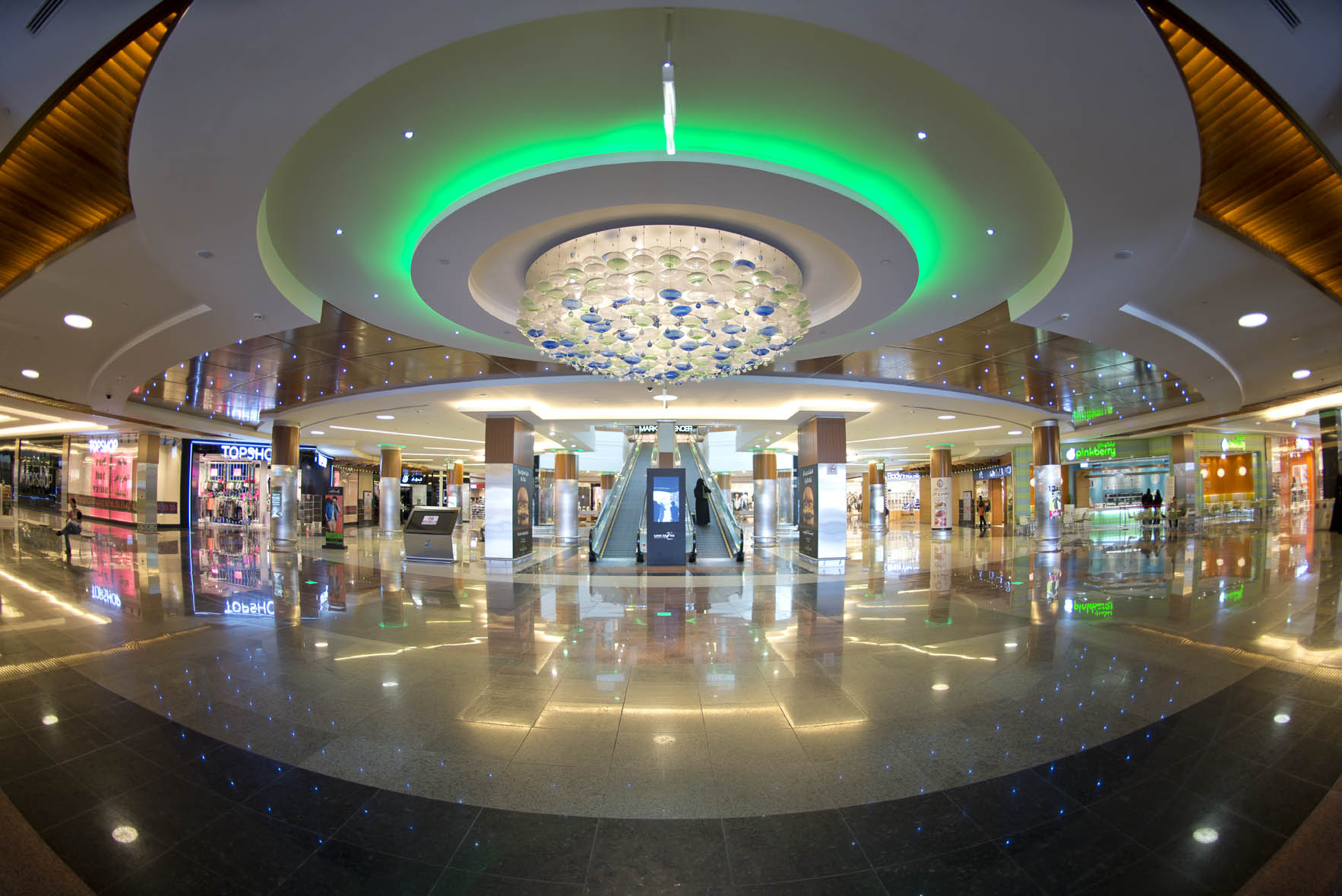
Dalma Mall corridor

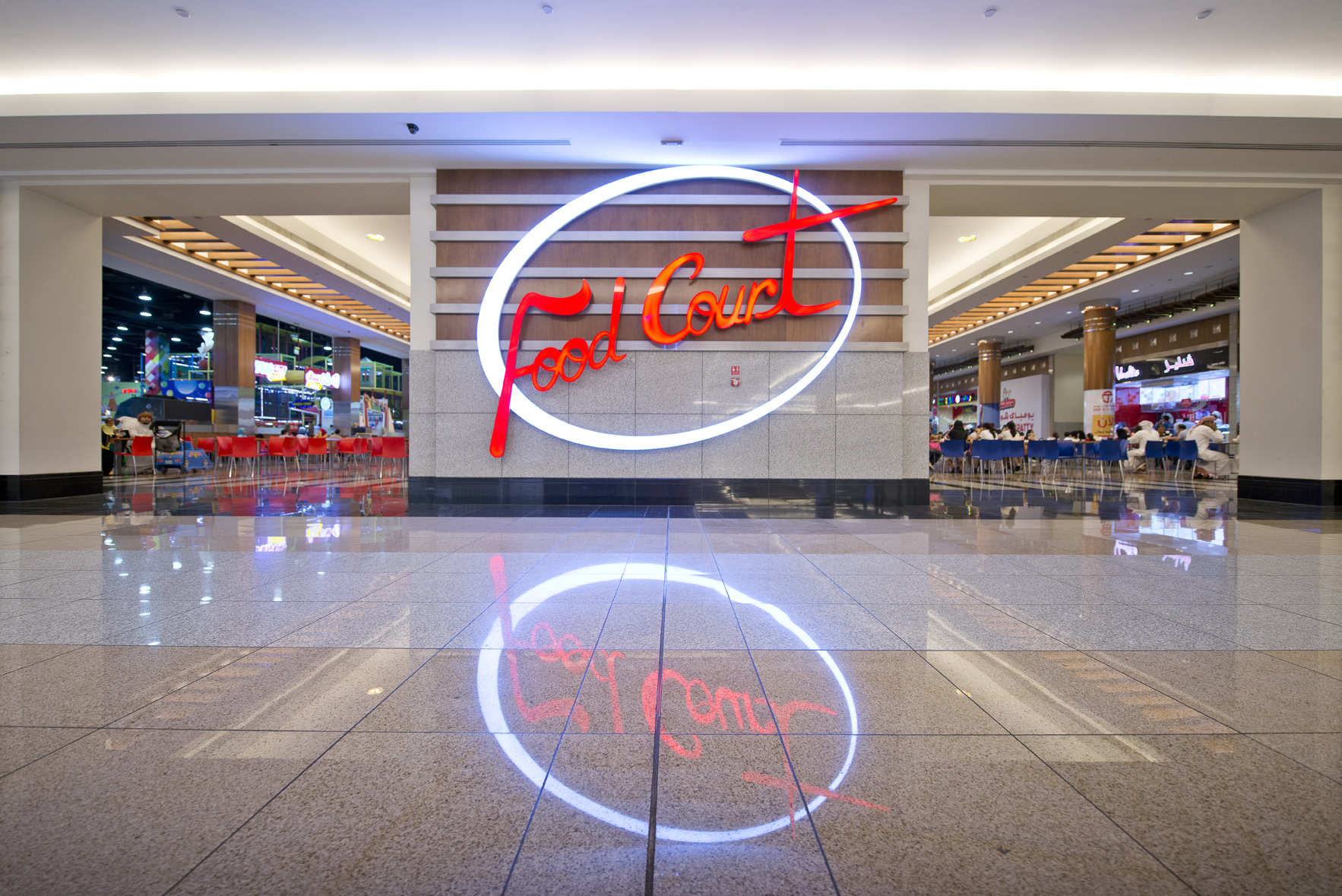
Dalma Mall food court – level 2

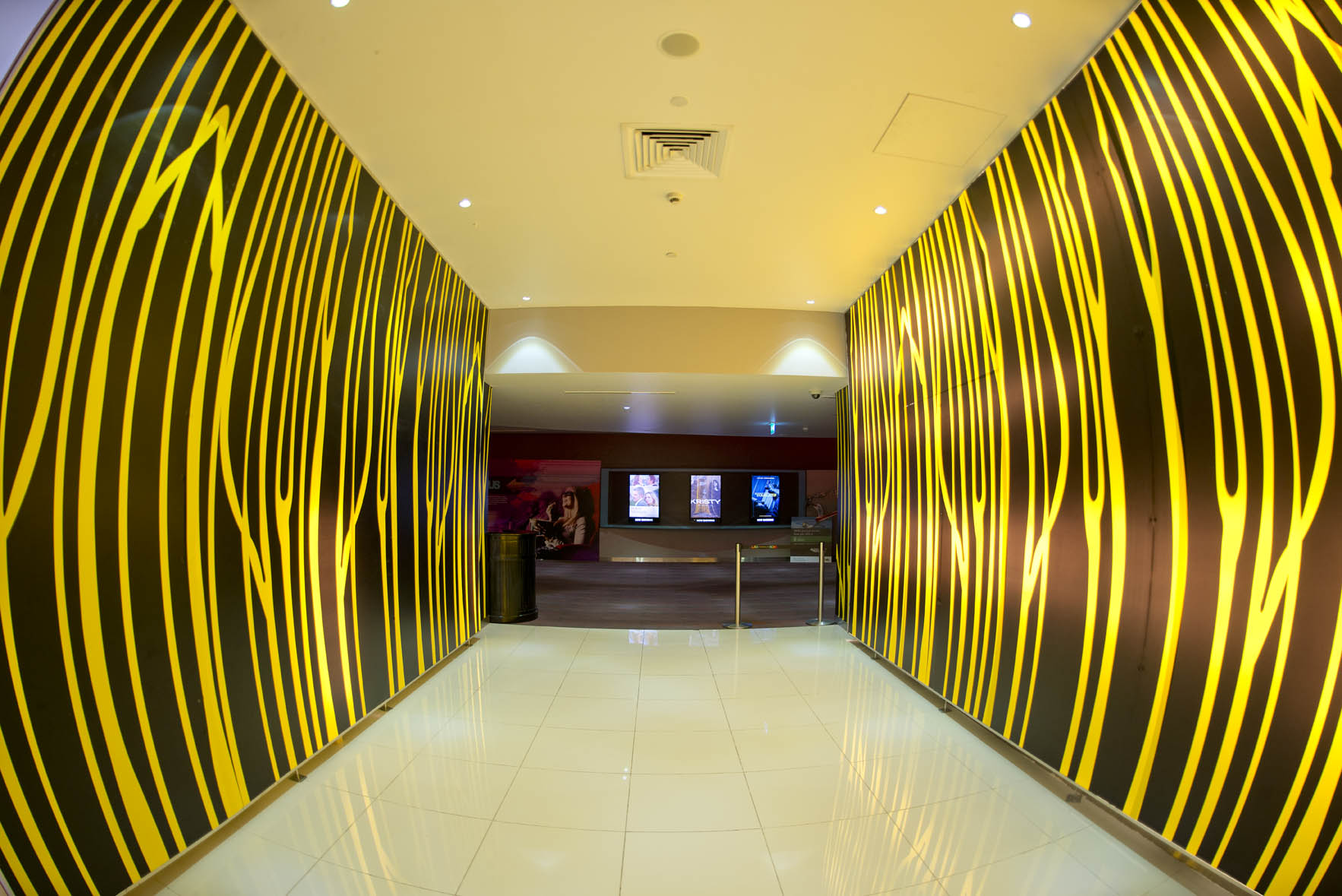
Cine Royal corridor, level 2, Dalma Mall

== Bibliography ==
- Saab, Nehal; Abou-Hichme, Khaled (2014-08-17). "Time to go 'Back to School' with Dalma Mall". Business. MENAFN Press.
