= MY Delma =

Superyacht

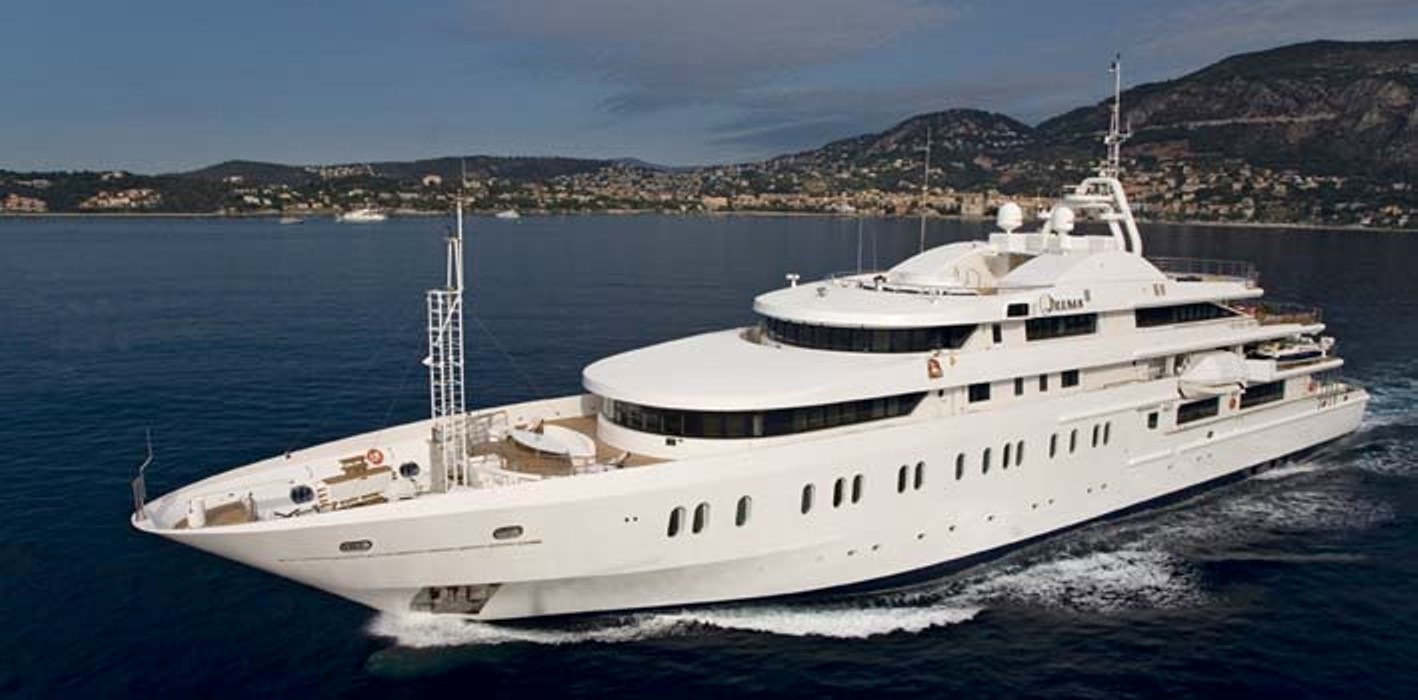
Delma in Cannes

Delma is a private superyacht. It was pronounced the 27th largest private yacht in the year 2008 in Monte Carlo, Monaco. The Dubai-registered Delma measures length: 279 ft 7 • 85.23 m. It is available for charter.

Both the hull and the superstructure are made of steel and aluminum. The propulsion plant consists of two Caterpillar diesel engines, with a total power of 5060 kW (over 5520 bhp), and controllable-pitch propellers producing a speed of over 17 knots. A hydraulically operated system of shell ports, doors, flaps, roofs, bath platforms, gangways and cranes provide the most possible ease of operation and comfort. The anchors, launches, life rafts and navigation lanterns are hidden behind covers and do not disturb the aesthetics of the yacht.

== Overview ==
- Name: Delma
- Type: Motor Yacht
- Model: Custom
- Builder: Neorion Shipyards Syros
- Naval Architect: Alpha Marine
- Exterior Designers: Alpha Marine
- Lally Poulias
- Interior Designer: Alpha Marine
- Lally Poulias
- Year: 2004
- Flag: Malta
- MCA: Yes
- Class: Lloyd's Register
- Hull NB: 1101

Hull Colour: - White

== Dimensions ==
- Length Overall: 85.30 m (279 ft 10 in)
- Length at Waterline: 74.80 m (245 ft 5 in)
- Beam: 14.40 m (47 ft 3 in)
- Draft (max): 4.20 m (13 ft 9 in)
- Tonnage: 2990 tonnes

== Accommodations ==
- Guests: 36
- Cabins Total: -
- Cabins: -
- Crew: 34

== Construction ==
- Hull Configuration: Displacement
- Hull Material: Steel
- Superstructure: Aluminum
- Deck Material: Teak
- Decks NB: -
- Engine(s)
- Quantity: 2
- Fuel Type: Diesel

Manufacturer: Caterpillar

- Model: 3606
- Power: 2760 hp / 2030 kW
- Total Power: 5520 hp / 4060 kW
- Propulsion: Twin Screw

== Performance & Capabilities ==
- Max Speed: 17.0 kn
- Cruising Speed: 15.0 kn
- Range: 7,000 nmi at 15 kn
- Fuel Capacity: 234,455 L / 51,572.87 US Gal
- Water Capacity: 110,213 L / 24,243.46 US Gal

== Equipment ==
- Generator:
- Stabilizers: -
- Shaft line Propulsion: - Rolls-Royce propeller 60 P1/4
- Reduction gear - Rolls-Royce 480 AGHC
- Thrusters: - Rolls-Royce 1100 CP KI Tunnel Thruster
- Steering gear: - Rolls-Royce SR622
- Amenities: Helicopter Landing Pad
