= Husnicioara =

- Commune
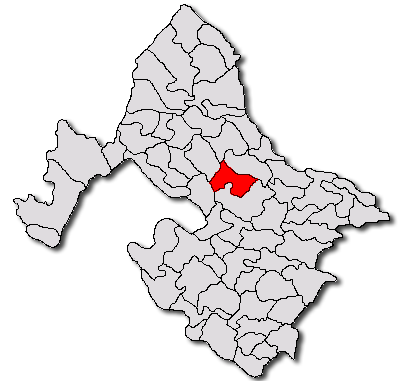
- Location in Mehedinți County

- Location in Romania
- Coordinates: 44°41′N 22°51′E
- Country: Romania
- County: Mehedinți
- Area: 74.84 km^{2} (28.90 sq mi)
- Population (2021-12-01): 1,064
  - Density: 14.22/km^{2} (36.82/sq mi)
- Time zone: UTC+02:00 (EET)
  - Summer (DST): UTC+03:00 (EEST)
- Vehicle reg.: MH

Husnicioara is a commune located in Mehedinți County, Oltenia, Romania. It is composed of eleven villages: Alunișul, Bădițești, Borogea, Celnata, Dumbrăvița, Husnicioara, Marmanu, Oprănești, Peri, Priboiești and Selișteni.
