= Pelendava =

Dacian fortified settlement

- Pelendaua
- Location within Romania
- 44.30°N 23.70°E
- Location: Craiova, Dolj County, Romania

Pelendava (Pelendoua, Potulatensioi, Polonda) was a Dacian town.

== See also ==
- Dacian davae
- List of ancient cities in Thrace and Dacia
- Dacia
- Roman Dacia
