= Florești, Mehedinți =

Florești
- Commune
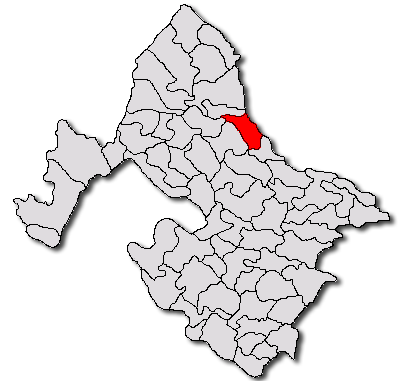
- Location in Mehedinți County

- Location in Romania
- Coordinates: 44.77°N 22.95°E
- Country: Romania
- County: Mehedinți
- Area: 55.51 km^{2} (21.43 sq mi)
- Population (2021-12-01): 2,311
  - Density: 41.63/km^{2} (107.8/sq mi)
- Time zone: UTC+02:00 (EET)
  - Summer (DST): UTC+03:00 (EEST)
- Vehicle reg.: MH

Florești is a commune located in Mehedinți County, Oltenia, Romania. It is composed of nine villages: Copăcioasa, Florești, Gârdoaia, Livezi, Moșneni, Peșteana, Peștenuța, Stroești and Zegujani.
