= Șișești, Mehedinți =

Șișești
- Commune
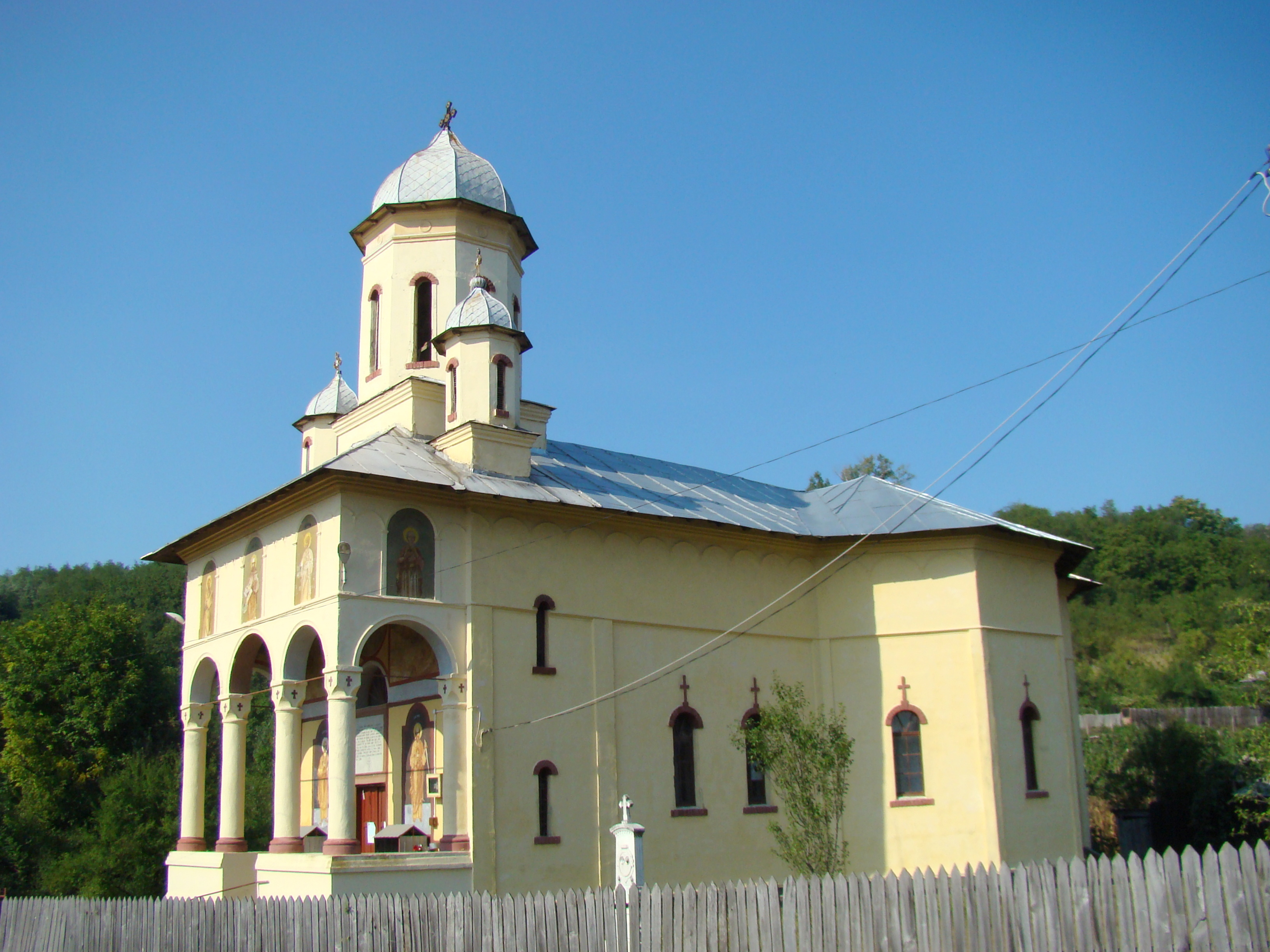
- Saint Gregory of Dekapolis' Church in Șișești

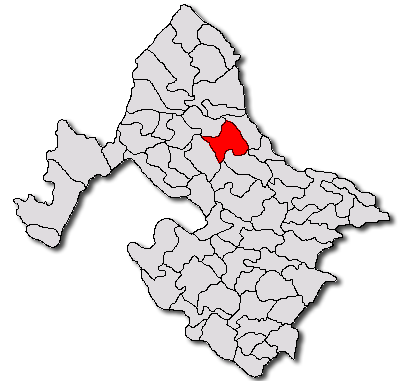
- Location in Mehedinți County

- Location in Romania
- Coordinates: 44°47′N 22°50′E
- Country: Romania
- County: Mehedinți

Government
  - Mayor (2024–2028): Marian Ion Răducan (Ind.)
- Area: 75.20 km^{2} (29.03 sq mi)
- Elevation: 213 m (699 ft)
- Population (2021-12-01): 2,417
  - Density: 32.14/km^{2} (83.24/sq mi)
- Time zone: UTC+02:00 (EET)
  - Summer (DST): UTC+03:00 (EEST)
- Postal code: 227455
- Area code: +(40) 252
- Vehicle reg.: MH
- Website: comunasisestimh.ro

Șișești is a commune located in Mehedinți County, Oltenia, Romania. It is composed of six villages: Cărămidaru, Ciovârnășani, Cocorova, Crăguești, Noapteșa, and Șișești.

Historical population
Year	Pop.	±%
2002	3,210	—
2011	2,959	−7.8%
2021	2,417	−18.3%
Source: Census data

== Natives ==
- Petre Daea (born 1949), politician
- Gheorghe Ionescu-Sisești (1885–1967), agronomer, titular member of the Romanian Academy
- Nicolae Ionescu-Sisești (1888–1954), physician and academic, corresponding member of the Romanian Academy
