= Strehaia =

- Town
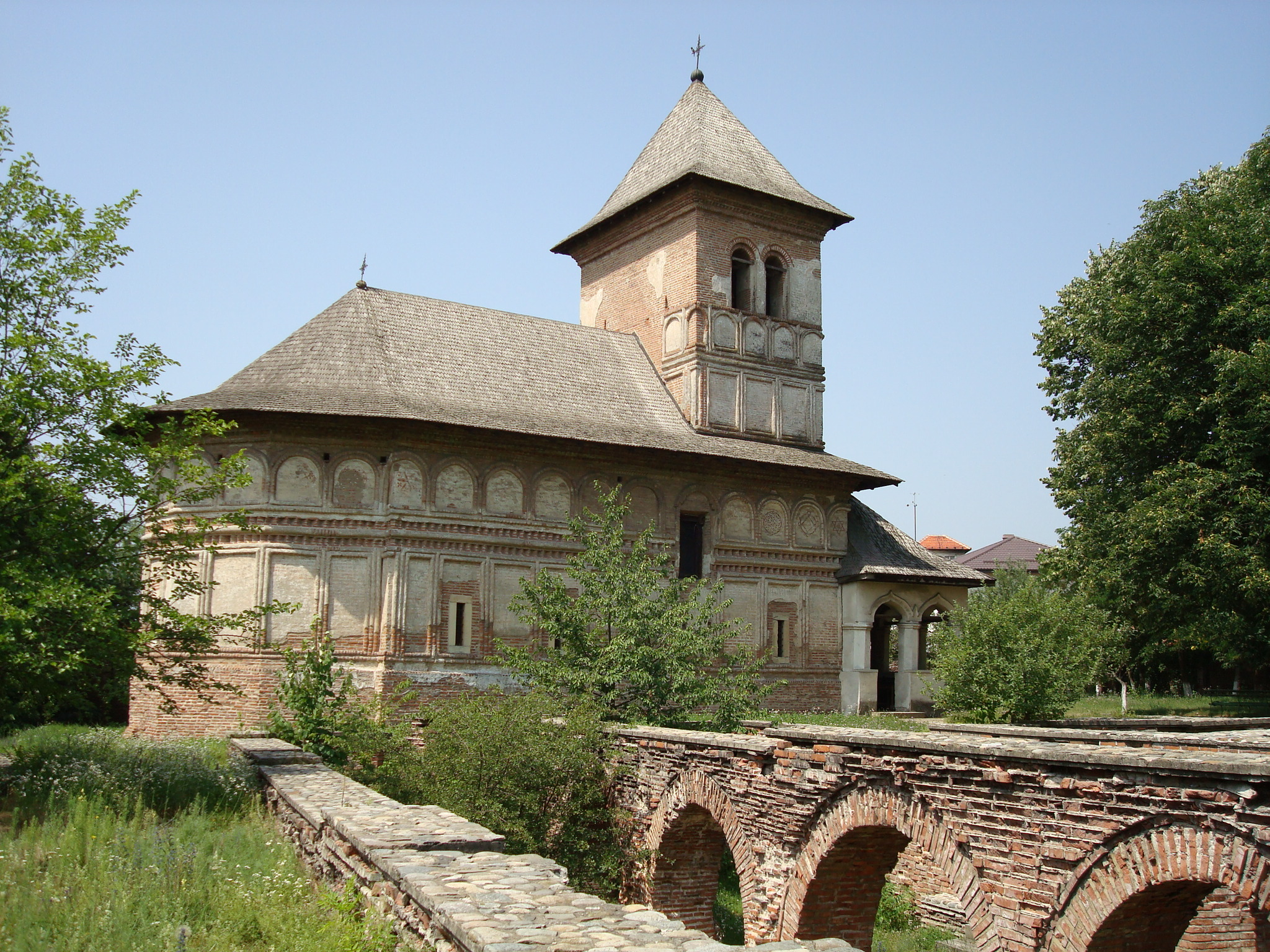
- Strehaia Monastery

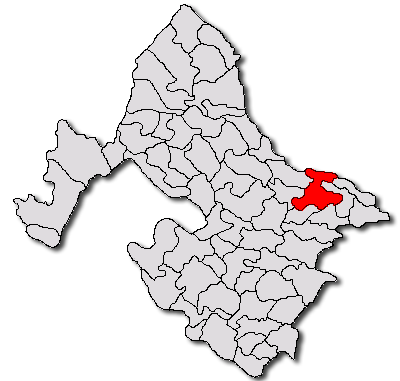
- Location in Mehedinți County

- Location in Romania
- Coordinates: 44°37′20″N 23°11′50″E
- Country: Romania
- County: Mehedinți

Government
  - Mayor (2024–2028): Ioan Giura (PSD)
- Area: 108.64 km^{2} (41.95 sq mi)
- Elevation: 150 m (490 ft)
- Population (2021-12-01): 9,059
  - Density: 83.39/km^{2} (216.0/sq mi)
- Time zone: UTC+02:00 (EET)
  - Summer (DST): UTC+03:00 (EEST)
- Postal code: 225300
- Area code: (+40) 02 52
- Vehicle reg.: MH
- Website: www.primariastrehaia.ro

Strehaia (Romanian pronunciation: [streˈhaja]) is a town in Mehedinți County, Oltenia, Romania. It is situated on the Motru River valley, in the eastern part of the county. Nine villages are administered by the town: Ciochiuța, Comanda, Hurducești, Lunca Banului, Menți, Motruleni, Slătinicu Mare, Slătinicu Mic, and Stăncești.

== Geography ==
The town is located 48 km (30 mi) east of the county seat, Drobeta-Turnu Severin, on national road DN6 (part of the European route E70). It lies on the border with Gorj County, 25 km (16 mi) west of Filiași and 29 km (18 mi) southeast of Motru.

Forests in the vicinity are home to the largest Hermann's tortoise colonies in Oltenia.

== Demographics ==
At the 2011 census, the town had a population of 9,837. Of these, 88.79% were Romanians and 11.11% Roma; 99.4% were Romanian Orthodox. By the 2021 census, Strehaia's population had decreased to 9,059 inhabitants; of those, 72.26% were Romanians and 14.28% Roma.

== History ==
Strehaia was first mentioned in documents of the 15th century. As an alternative location for the residence of Oltenian Bans during the early Craiovești rules, the town still features the foundation of the Banate estate house; it had replaced Severin due to frequent Ottoman attacks, and was in turn replaced by Craiova, remaining a largely rural locality.

The Monastery of Strehaia was built by Wallachian Prince Matei Basarab in 1645. In 1671, a cattle fair was organized in the town, a regular event which contributed to the town's development. Strehaia was the site of skirmishes between the Pandurs of Tudor Vladimirescu and troops loyal to Scarlat Callimachi, during the Wallachian uprising of 1821.

The estates of Prince Antoine Bibesco were located near Strehaia.

== Climate ==
Strehaia has a humid subtropical climate (Köppen: Cfa) with Mediterranean influences. The lowest recorded temperature was −33.8 °C, recorded on 25 January 1938, while the highest was 43.5 °C, recorded on 20 August 1946 and 8 September 1946 (which is the highest temperature ever recorded during the month of September in Romania). On average, the area experiences around 55 days per year with temperatures below 0 °C and approximately 30 days with temperatures above 30 °C.

Average annual precipitation is between 600 and 650 mm.

During spring and summer, the dominant air masses are temperate maritime air masses originating from the Atlantic Ocean, which bring significant precipitation. Moist Atlantic air masses also frequently reach the region during winter, producing periods of rain and snowfall and, less frequently, cold spells.

Both westerly and easterly winds are common in the area. The Austrul, locally also known as „vântul de la deal”, occurs throughout the year and is generally strongest during summer.

Calm conditions occur relatively frequently, with an annual average frequency of 38.3%. December has the highest frequency of calm conditions, at 47.3%, while May has the lowest, at 30.3%.

Climate data for Strehaia (elevation 150 m, 2001–2025 normals, extremes 1896–present)
Month	Jan	Feb	Mar	Apr	May	Jun	Jul	Aug	Sep	Oct	Nov	Dec	Year
Record high °C (°F)	19.7 (67.5)	23.5 (74.3)	27.3 (81.1)	31.2 (88.2)	36.0 (96.8)	39.4 (102.9)	43.2 (109.8)	43.5 (110.3)	43.5 (110.3)	32.0 (89.6)	25.8 (78.4)	18.0 (64.4)	43.5 (110.3)
Mean daily maximum °C (°F)	4.6 (40.3)	7.3 (45.1)	13.1 (55.6)	18.7 (65.7)	23.7 (74.7)	28.2 (82.8)	30.9 (87.6)	30.8 (87.4)	25.2 (77.4)	18.2 (64.8)	11.2 (52.2)	5.5 (41.9)	18.1 (64.6)
Daily mean °C (°F)	0.5 (32.9)	2.7 (36.9)	7.6 (45.7)	12.7 (54.9)	17.4 (63.3)	21.6 (70.9)	23.9 (75.0)	23.8 (74.8)	18.8 (65.8)	12.7 (54.9)	7.2 (45.0)	1.9 (35.4)	12.6 (54.6)
Mean daily minimum °C (°F)	−3.6 (25.5)	−1.9 (28.6)	2.2 (36.0)	6.6 (43.9)	11.2 (52.2)	15.1 (59.2)	16.9 (62.4)	16.8 (62.2)	12.4 (54.3)	7.2 (45.0)	3.2 (37.8)	−1.7 (28.9)	7.0 (44.7)
Record low °C (°F)	−33.0 (−27.4)	−31.0 (−23.8)	−24.5 (−12.1)	−6.9 (19.6)	−2.0 (28.4)	1.0 (33.8)	4.1 (39.4)	3.5 (38.3)	−3.0 (26.6)	−7.5 (18.5)	−15.5 (4.1)	−28.5 (−19.3)	−33.0 (−27.4)
Average precipitation mm (inches)	51 (2.0)	39 (1.5)	46 (1.8)	53 (2.1)	72 (2.8)	80 (3.1)	69 (2.7)	51 (2.0)	54 (2.1)	54 (2.1)	59 (2.3)	56 (2.2)	684 (26.7)
Average precipitation days (≥ 1.0 mm)	8	7	8	7	10	10	8	6	7	6	8	7	92
Source 1: Administrația Națională de Meteorologie (MeteoRomania), CC-BY-SA-4.0
Source 2: Ocolul Silvic Filiași (extremes)

Historical population
Year	Pop.	±%
1930	7,870	—
1948	7,776	−1.2%
1956	8,545	+9.9%
1966	9,768	+14.3%
1977	11,271	+15.4%
1992	12,324	+9.3%
2002	12,564	+1.9%
2011	9,837	−21.7%
2021	9,059	−7.9%
Source: Census data

== Natives ==
- Rodion Cămătaru (born 1958), footballer
- Adrian Pigulea (born 1968), footballer
- Nicolae Popescu (1937–2010), mathematician
