= Bala, Mehedinți =

Bala
- Commune
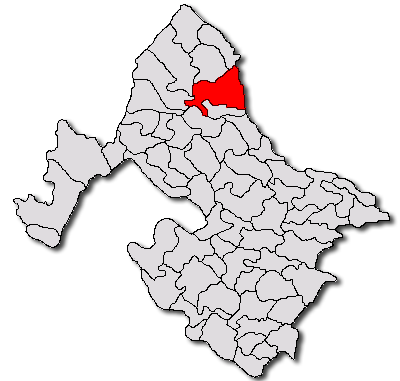
- Location in Mehedinți County

- Location in Romania
- Coordinates: 44.88°N 22.83°E
- Country: Romania
- County: Mehedinți
- Area: 101.11 km^{2} (39.04 sq mi)
- Population (2021-12-01): 3,289
  - Density: 32.53/km^{2} (84.25/sq mi)
- Time zone: UTC+02:00 (EET)
  - Summer (DST): UTC+03:00 (EEST)
- Vehicle reg.: MH

Bala is a commune located in Mehedinți County, Oltenia, Romania. It is composed of fifteen villages: Bala, Bala de Sus, Brateșul, Brativoești, Câmpu Mare, Cârșu, Comănești, Crainici, Dâlma, Iupca, Molani, Rudina, Runcușoru, Sărdănești and Vidimirești. It is situated in the historical region of Oltenia.
