= Cătunele =

- Commune
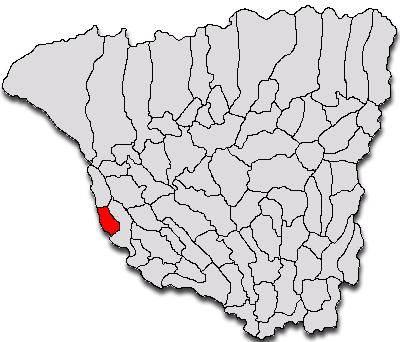
- Location in Gorj County

- Location in Romania
- Coordinates: 44°49′N 22°56′E
- Country: Romania
- County: Gorj
- Subdivisions: Cătunele, Dealu Viilor, Lupoaia, Steic, Valea Mănăstirii, Valea Perilor
- Area: 32.39 km^{2} (12.51 sq mi)
- Population (2021-12-01): 2,569
  - Density: 79.31/km^{2} (205.4/sq mi)
- Time zone: UTC+02:00 (EET)
  - Summer (DST): UTC+03:00 (EEST)
- Vehicle reg.: GJ

Cătunele is a commune in Gorj County, Oltenia, Romania. It is composed of six villages: Cătunele, Dealu Viilor, Lupoaia, Steic, Valea Mănăstirii and Valea Perilor.
