= List of suicides (1900–1999) =

The following notable people have died by suicide. This includes suicides effected under duress and excludes deaths by accident or misadventure. People who may or may not have died by their own hand, whose intent to die is disputed, or who are alleged to have been killed, may be listed.

== Confirmed ==
=== A ===
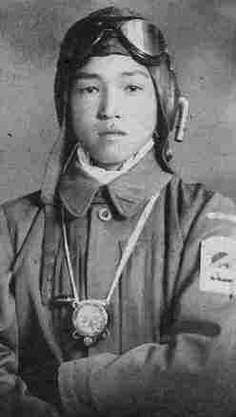
Yukio Araki

- Chris Acland (1996), English drummer for the band Lush, hanging
- Art Acord (1931), American actor and rodeo champion, ingestion of poison
- Robert Adams Jr. (1906), Congressman from Pennsylvania, gunshot
- Stanley Adams (1977), American actor and screenwriter, gunshot wound
- Sergey Akhromeyev (1991), Marshal of the Soviet Union, hanging
- Stephen Akinmurele (1999), British suspected serial killer, hanging
- Ryūnosuke Akutagawa (1927), Japanese writer, overdose of barbital
- Ross Alexander (1937), American actor, gunshot to the head
- Ghazaleh Alizadeh (1996), Iranian poet and writer, hanging
- Salvador Allende (1973), 28th president of Chile, gunshot
- Nadezhda Alliluyeva (1932), wife of Joseph Stalin, gunshot
- Jeff Alm (1993), American football player, gunshot
- Jason Altom (1998), American PhD student, potassium cyanide
- Jean Améry (1978), Austrian writer, overdose of sleeping pills
- Korechika Anami (1945), Japanese War Minister, stabbed himself as part of ritual seppuku disembowelment
- Forrest H. Anderson (1989), Governor of Montana, gunshot
- Mary A. Anderson (1996), unidentified woman using an alias, cyanide poisoning
- Odysseas Angelis (1987), Greek general and head of the Hellenic Armed Forces during the Greek junta, hanging
- Roger Angleton (1998), American murderer, cut himself over 50 times with a razor
- Marshall Applewhite (1997), American leader of the Heaven's Gate religious cult, suffocated himself as part of the cult's mass suicide that year
- Araki Yukio (1945), Japanese kamikaze pilot
- Diane Arbus (1971), American photographer, overdosed on pills and slashed her wrists
- Reinaldo Arenas (1990), Cuban-American artist and writer, drug and alcohol overdose
- José María Arguedas (1969), Peruvian novelist and poet, gunshot
- Pedro Armendáriz (1963), Mexican actor, gunshot
- Edwin Howard Armstrong (1954), American inventor of FM radio, jumped from a 13th floor window
- Süleyman Askerî (1915), Ottoman Army officier, gunshot
- Tore Asplund (1977), Swedish-born American painter, hanging
- Ruben Oskar Auervaara (1964), Finnish con artist, hanging
- Marion Aye (1951), American actress, ingestion of bi-chloride of mercury tablets
- May Ayim (1996), German author, jumped from 13th floor of a Berlin building
- Albert Ayler (1970), American jazz saxophonist, jumped into New York City's East River

=== B ===
- Andreas Baader (1977), German Red Army Faction (RAF) terrorist, official enquiries found that he died by prisoner suicide, by shooting himself in the back of the neck with his left hand, he was right-handed.
- Yevgeni Babich (1972), Soviet ice hockey player, hanging
- Josef Bachmann (1970), German anti-communist, who made an assassination attempt on the German student movement-leader Rudi Dutschke, asphyxiation with plastic bag
- Faith Bacon (1956), American burlesque dancer and actress, jumped from hotel window
- David Bairstow (1998), English cricketer, hanging
- James Robert Baker (1997), American writer, asphyxiation
- Joe Ball (1938), American serial killer, gunshot
- Lou Bandy (1959), Dutch singer and comedian
- Somen "Steve" Banerjee (1994), Indian American entrepreneur, co-founder of Chippendales and convicted criminal, hanging
- Bantcho Bantchevsky (1988), Bulgarian American singer, jump from New York Metropolitan Opera balcony
- Moshe Barazani, blew himself up with an IED in Jerusalem in 1947. (Note: Possibly the first suicide using explosives in the Middle East.)
- Erich Bärenfänger (1945), German general
- R. H. Barlow (1951), American writer and anthropologist, barbiturate overdose
- Boris Barnet (1965), Russian film director, hanging
- Uwe Barschel (1987), German politician, ingested five sleeping potions
- Mark O. Barton (1999), American spree killer, gunshot
- Ralph Barton (1931), American artist, gunshot
- Pierre Batcheff (1932), French actor, overdose of barbital
- Herb Baumeister (1996), American serial killer, gunshot
- Amelie "Melli" Beese (1925), German pioneer aviator, gunshot
- Peter Bellamy (1991), English folk musician and member of the band The Young Tradition
- Brenda Benet (1982), American television and film actress, gunshot
- Walter Benjamin (1940), German-Jewish literary critic and culture theorist, morphine overdose
- Jill Bennett (1990), English actress, secobarbital overdose
- Louis Bennison (1929), American actor, gunshot
- Pierre Bérégovoy (1993), French politician and Prime Minister (1992–93), gunshot
- Mary Kay Bergman (1999), American voice actress, gunshot
- Marty Bergen (1900), American baseball player, cut throat with a razor after killing his family with an ax
- John Berryman (1972), American poet, jumped off the Washington Avenue Bridge in Minneapolis, Minnesota
- Bruno Bettelheim (1990), Austrian-born US psychologist and writer, asphyxiation with plastic bag
- Jens Bjørneboe (1976), Norwegian novelist, hanging
- Eli M. Black (1975), CEO of United Fruit Co., jumped out of a building
- Clara Blandick (1962), American stage and screen actress
- Vasily Blokhin (1955), Soviet general and NKVD executioner
- Adele Blood (1936), American actress, gunshot
- Clara Bloodgood (1907), American Broadway actress, gunshot
- Ludwig Boltzmann (1906), Austrian physicist, known for thermodynamics and atomic theory, hanging
- Jeremy Michael Boorda (1996), US Chief of Naval Operations, gunshot to the chest
- Éric Borel (1995), French high school student and spree killer, gunshot
- Adrian Borland (1999), English singer-songwriter (The Outsiders, The Sound), jumped in front of a moving train
- Martin Bormann (1945), German head of the Nazi Party Chancellery, cyanide poisoning
- Jean-Louis Bory (1979), French writer, gunshot to the chest
- Yevgenia Bosch (1925), Soviet Bolshevik revolutionary and politician, gunshot
- Dallen Bounds (1999), American serial killer, gunshot
- John Bowers (1936), American actor, drowning
- Tommy Boyce (1994), American songwriter, gunshot
- Karin Boye (1941), Swedish writer
- Charles Boyer (1978), French actor, secobarbital overdose
- Thomas Lynn Bradford (1921), American spiritualist lecturer and psychic detective, gas inhalation
- Cheyenne Brando (1995), Tahitian model/actress, hanging
- Mike Brant (1975), Israeli pop star jumped from his Paris apartment building
- Robert Eugene Brashers (1999), American serial killer, gunshot
- Eva Braun (1945), German wife of Adolf Hitler, cyanide poisoning
- Richard Brautigan (1984), American writer, gunshot
- Gaetano Bresci (1901), Italian anarchist who assassinated King Umberto I of Italy, hanging
- James E. Brewton (1967), American painter and printmaker, gunshot
- Lilya Brik (1978), Russian author and socialite, overdose of sleeping pills
- John Munro Bruce (1901), Australian businessman, father of Prime Minister Stanley Bruce
- Roy Buchanan (1988), American guitarist and blues musician, hanging
- Dale Buggins (1981), Australian stunt motorcyclist, gunshot
- Wilhelm Burgdorf (1945), German general, Chief of the Army Personnel Office and Chief Adjutant to Adolf Hitler, gunshot
- Dan Burros (1965), Jewish American neo-Nazi activist and member of the Ku Klux Klan, gunshot to the head
- August Anheuser Busch Sr. (1934), American CEO of Anheuser-Busch, gunshot
- Germán Busch (1939), Bolivian military officer and 41st and 43rd President of Bolivia, gunshot

=== C ===
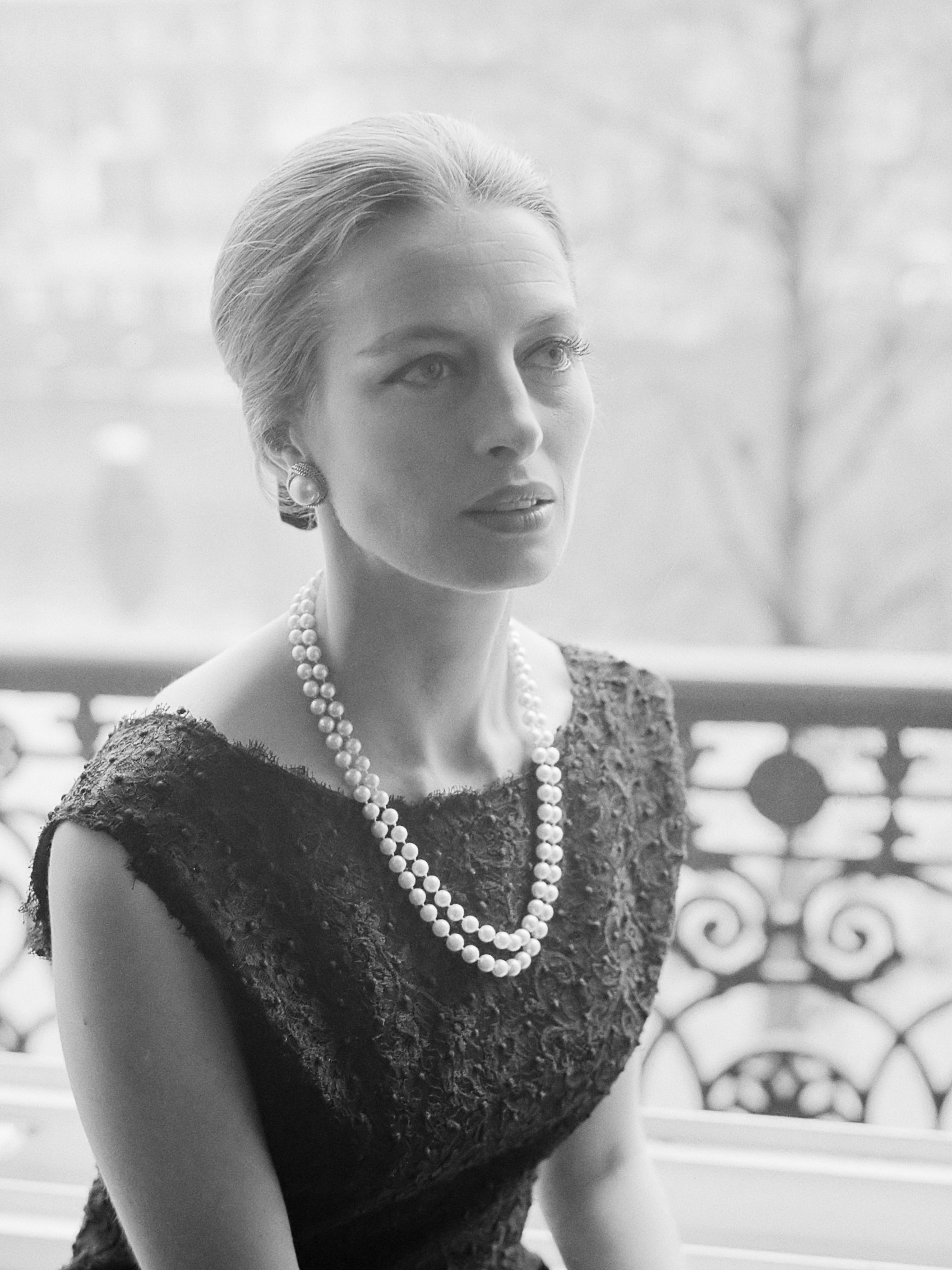
Capucine

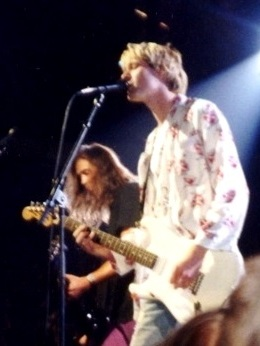
Kurt Cobain

- Donald Cammell (1996), Scottish film director, gunshot
- Capucine (1990), French actress and model, jumped from an eighth-floor apartment
- George Caragonne (1995), American comic book writer, jumped from the 45th floor of the Marriott Marquis Hotel in Manhattan
- Wallace Carothers (1937), American inventor of nylon, cyanide poisoning
- Dora Carrington (1932), English artist, gunshot
- Kevin Carter (1994), South African photojournalist, carbon monoxide poisoning
- Carlos Castilho (1987), Brazilian footballer and manager
- Paul Celan (1970), Romanian poet, drowning in the Seine
- Richard Chase (1980), American serial killer, anti-depressant overdose
- Gilles Châtelet (1999), French philosopher and mathematician
- Gu Cheng (1993), Chinese poet, hanging
- David Christie (1997), French singer
- Christine Chubbuck (1974), American television reporter, gunshot
- Diana Churchill (1963), eldest daughter of British Prime Minister Winston Churchill, barbiturate overdose
- Frank Churchill (1942), American film composer, gunshot
- Paul Clayton (1967), American folksinger and folklorist, electrocution
- Robert George Clements (1947), Irish physician and suspected murderer, morphine overdose
- Kurt Cobain (1994), American singer/songwriter, and frontman of the band Nirvana, gunshot
- Jack Cole (1958), American cartoonist known as the creator of Plastic Man, gunshot to the head with a rifle
- Ray Combs (1996), American comedian, actor, and television game show host, hanging
- Adolfo Constanzo (1989), American serial killer, drug dealer, warlock and cult leader, ordered a follower to shoot him
- Tony Costa (1974), American serial killer, hanging
- Hart Crane (1932), American poet, jumped off ship
- Darby Crash (1980), American singer (Germs), heroin overdose
- Robert W. Criswell (1905), American humorist and newspaperman, jumped in front of subway train
- Dennis Crosby (1991), American singer and actor, son of Bing Crosby, gunshot
- Harry Crosby (1929), American poet and publisher, gunshot
- Lindsay Crosby (1989), American singer and actor, youngest of Bing Crosby's four sons from his first marriage, gunshot
- Charles Crumb (1992), American comics writer and artist and brother of cartoonist Robert Crumb, overdosed on pills
- Andrew Cunanan (1997), American spree killer, gunshot
- Lester Cuneo (1925), American actor, gunshot
- Will Cuppy (1949), American humorist, sleeping pill overdose
- Ian Curtis (1980), English singer-songwriter (Joy Division), hanging
- Patricia Cutts (1974), English film and television actress, barbiturate overdose
- Adam Czerniaków (1942), Polish-Jewish senator and head of the Warsaw Ghetto Judenrat, cyanide poisoning

=== D ===
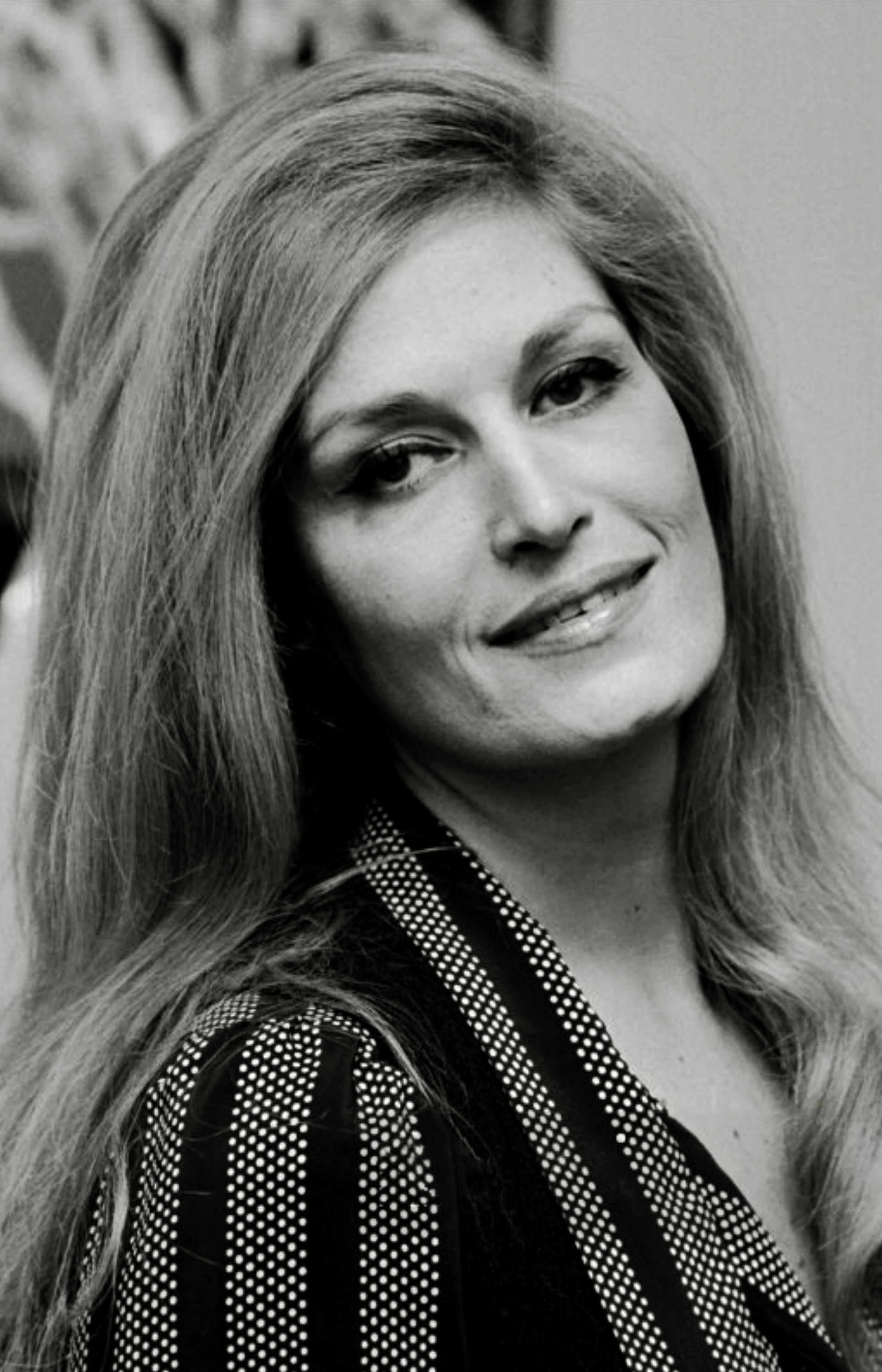
Dalida

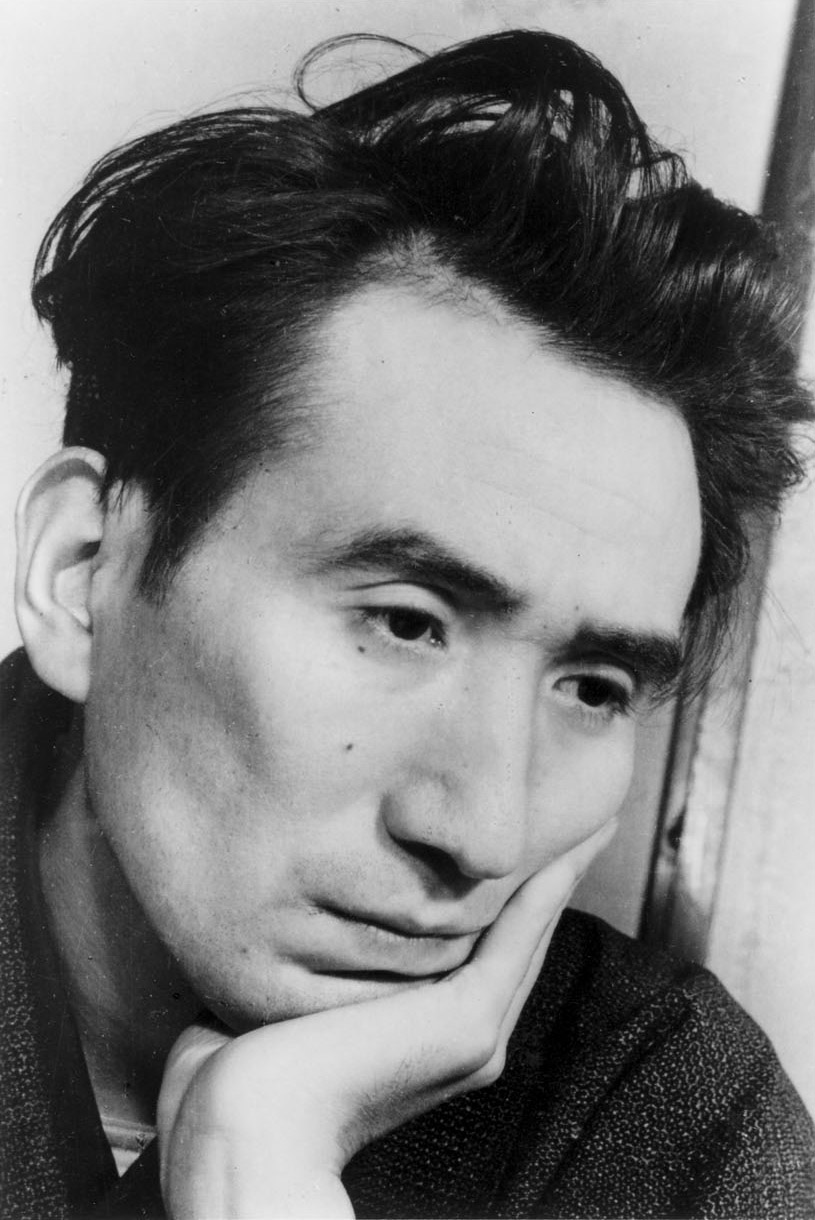
Osamu Dazai

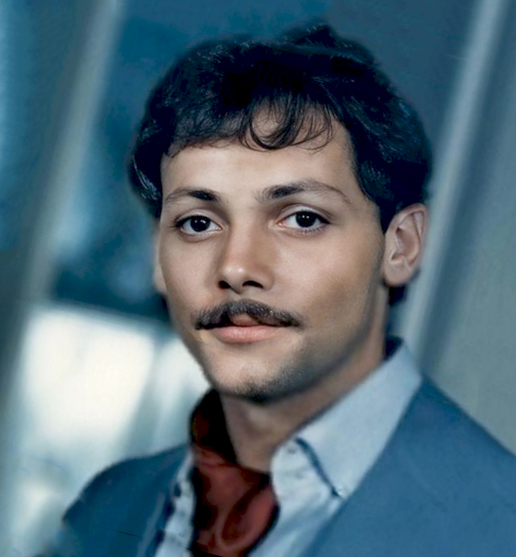
Patrick Dewaere

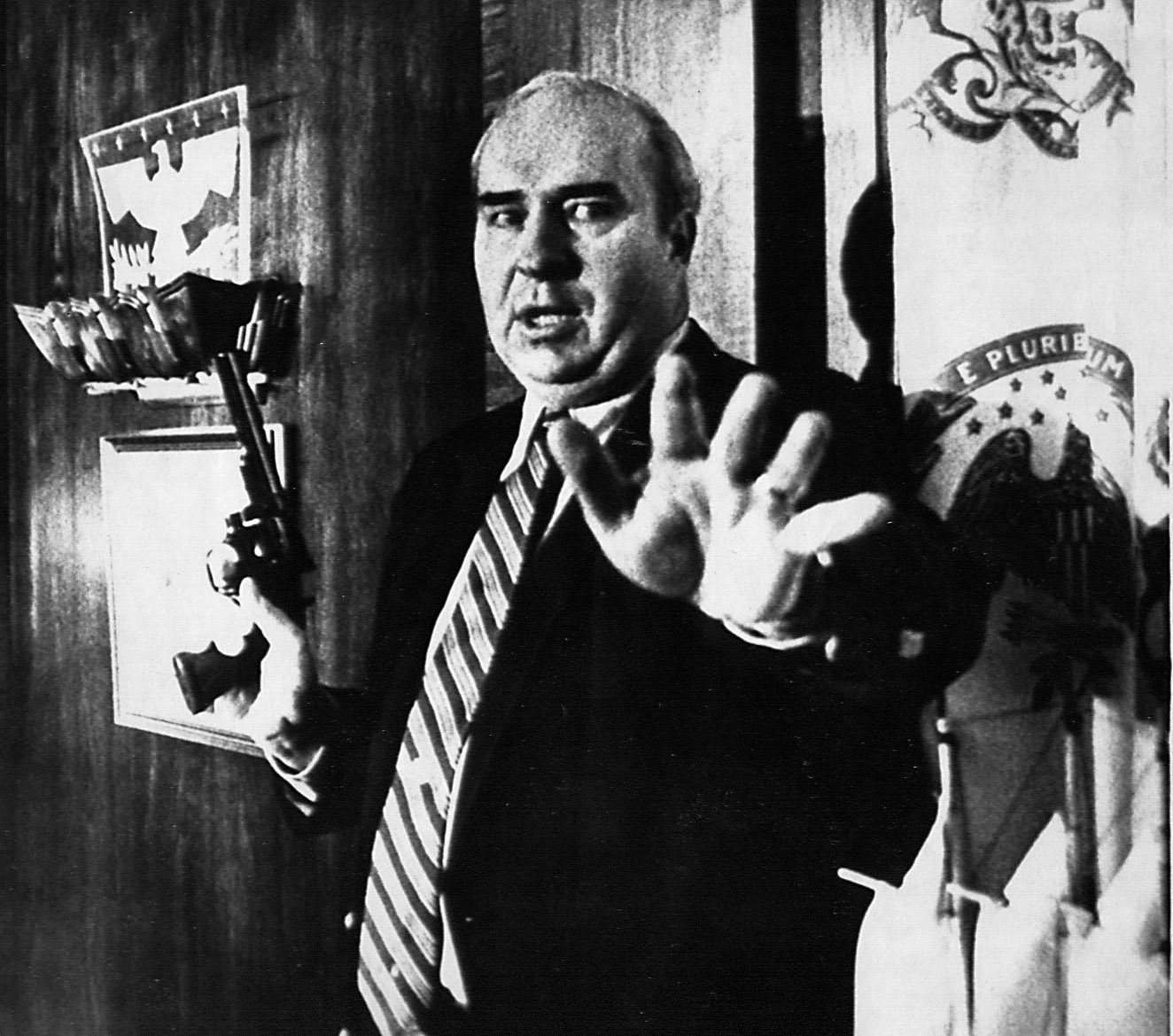
R. Budd Dwyer

- Stig Dagerman (1954), Swedish journalist and writer, carbon monoxide poisoning
- Dalida (1987), French-Italian singer, barbiturate overdose
- Karl Dane (1934), Danish-American silent film actor, gunshot
- Laurie Dann (1988), American murderer and arsonist, gunshot to the head
- Monika Dannemann (1996), German skater and painter, carbon monoxide exhaust fumes
- Bella Darvi (1971), Polish actress, gas inhalation
- Ali-Akbar Davar (1937), Iranian politician, judge and the founder of the modern judicial system of Iran, overdose of opium
- Alan Davies (1992), British footballer, carbon monoxide poisoning
- Brad Davis (1991), American actor, assisted barbiturate overdose
- Osamu Dazai (1948), Japanese author, drowning in the Tamagawa Aqueduct
- Alice de Janzé (1941), American heiress, gunshot
- Guy Debord (1994), French philosopher and founder of the Situationists International, gunshot
- Jeanine Deckers (1985), Belgian musician known as the Singing Nun, overdose of sedatives
- Gilles Deleuze (1995), French philosopher, self-defenestration
- Jeremy Wade Delle (1991), American high school student who inspired the Pearl Jam song "Jeremy", gunshot
- Penelope Delta (1941), Greek writer, poison
- Karl Denke (1924), German serial killer, hanging
- Jerry Desmonde (1967), English actor
- Julius Dettmann (1945), Nazi Germany Schutzstaffel (SS) officer who had Anne Frank and her relatives and friends arrested and deported, hanging
- Patrick Dewaere (1982), French actor, gunshot
- Joseph Di Mambro (1994), French religious leader and co-founder of Order of the Solar Temple
- Tove Ditlevsen (1976), Danish poet and author
- Adriaan Ditvoorst (1987), Dutch film director and screenwriter, drowning
- Michael Dorris (1997), American novelist, overdose of sleeping pills with vodka and asphyxiation
- Lynwood Drake (1992), American spree killer, gunshot
- Nick Drake (1974), English singer-songwriter, overdose of amitriptyline tablets
- Pete Duel (1971), American actor, gunshot
- R. Budd Dwyer (1987), American politician, gunshot to mouth

=== E ===
- George Eastman (1932), American inventor and philanthropist, gunshot to heart
- Edward I. Edwards (1931), American politician, gunshot to head
- Mack Ray Edwards (1971), American serial killer, hanging
- James Dallas Egbert III (1980), American university student, gunshot
- Paul Ehrenfest (1933), Austrian theoretical physicist, murder-suicide by shooting his son and himself
- Gudrun Ensslin (1977), German RAF terrorist, hanging
- Peg Entwistle (1932), Welsh-born American actress, jumped from the "H" in the Hollywood Sign (Note: At the time, the sign read "Hollywoodland".)
- Tom Evans (1983), English musician and songwriter for the group Badfinger, hanging

=== F ===
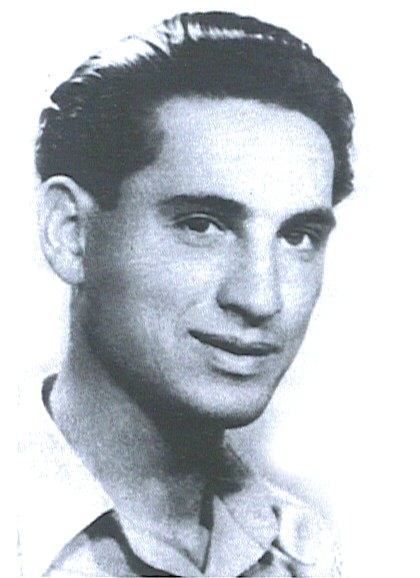
Meir Feinstein (Note: Note: "12 April" a misprint, they blew themselves up on the night of 21 April 1947.)

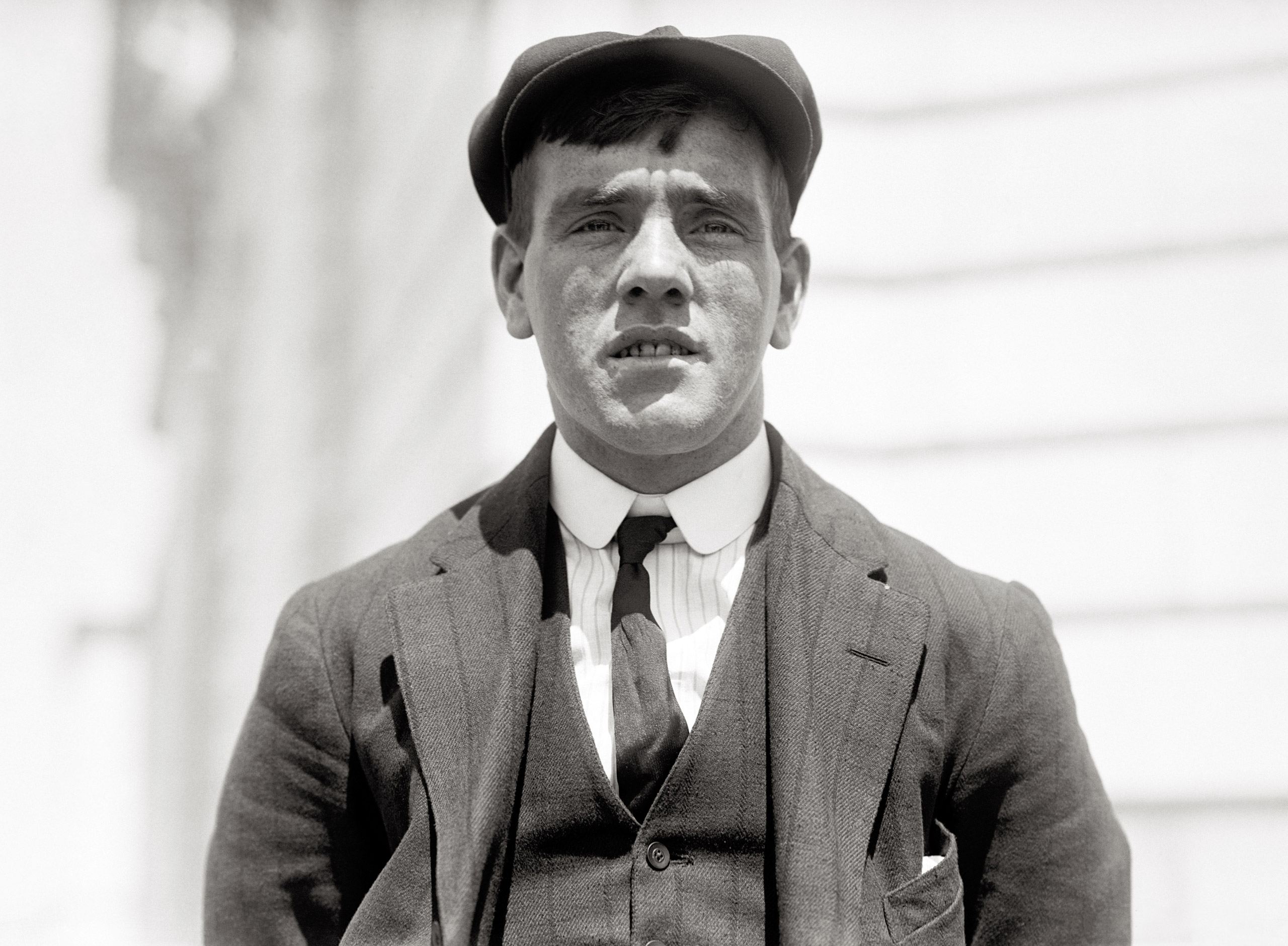
Frederick Fleet

- Hazel Farris (1906), American mass murderer, outlaw and fugitive whose mummy became a tourist attraction, alcohol and arsenic poisoning
- Justin Fashanu (1998), British footballer, hanging
- Meir Feinstein (1947) killed himself in prison with an IED, after being sentenced to death for the bombing of Jerusalem railway station. He was told the story of King Saul when he asked a Rabbi cryptic questions about suicide.
- Hans Fischer (1945), German organic chemist and recipient of the 1930 Nobel Prize in Chemistry
- Emil Fischer (1919), German chemist and recipient of the 1902 Nobel Prize in Chemistry
- Ed Flanders (1995), American actor, gunshot.
- John Bernard Flannagan (1942), American sculptor.
- Frederick Fleet (1965), English sailor and lookout on the Titanic who first spotted the iceberg that struck the vessel, hanging.
- Tom Forman (1926), American actor, director and producer, gunshot.
- Vince Foster (1993), American attorney and Deputy White House Counsel to Bill Clinton, gunshot to mouth.
- Wade Frankum (1991), Australian mass murderer who perpetrated the Strathfield massacre, gunshot.
- Sigmund Freud (1939), Austrian neurologist and founder of psychoanalysis, assisted suicide with morphine overdose
- John Friedrich (1991), Australian fraudster, gunshot.
- Emil Fuchs (1929), Austrian-American sculptor, gunshot.
- Fujimura Misao (1903), Japanese philosophy student and poet, jumped from the Kegon Falls.
- Anton Furst (1991), English production designer on Batman (1989), jump from an eighth story parking garage.

=== G ===
- Ed Gantner (1990), American professional wrestler and American football player, self-inflicted gunshot to the heart
- Romain Gary (1980), French novelist, diplomat, and film director, gunshot
- Danny Gatton (1994), American guitarist, gunshot
- Richard Gerstl (1908), Austrian painter, stabbing and hanging
- Karl Giese (1938), German archivist, museum curator and life partner of Magnus Hirschfeld
- Paul Gilbert (1976), American film and television actor, gunshot
- Rex Gildo (1999), German singer and actor, jump from his third-floor apartment window
- Richard Gilkey (1997), American painter, gunshot
- Claude Gillingwater (1939), American actor, gunshot
- Charlotte Perkins Gilman (1935), American writer, chloroform overdose
- Kurt Gloor (1997), Swiss film director, screenwriter and producer
- Holly Glynn (1987), a formerly unidentified young woman found in Dana Point, California, who had jumped off a cliff. Her body was not identified until 2015.
- Joseph Goebbels (1945), Nazi politician and Propaganda Minister, gunshot or cyanide poisoning
- Magda Goebbels (1945), German wife of Joseph Goebbels, assisted suicide by gunshot or cyanide poisoning
- Stella Goldschlag (1994), German-Jewish Nazi collaborator who exposed Jews in hiding during the Holocaust, drowning
- Dickie Goodman (1989), American novelty musician and record producer, gunshot
- Hermann Göring (1946), German politician, military leader, major figure in Nazi Party, potassium cyanide
- Arshile Gorky (1948), Armenian American painter; hanging
- Joachim Gottschalk (1941), German stage and film actor, gas inhalation
- Eddie Graham (1985), American professional wrestler, gunshot
- Frank Graham (1950), American voice actor and radio announcer, carbon monoxide poisoning
- Phil Graham (1963), American newspaper publisher, shotgun
- Wolfgang Grams (1993), German Red Army Faction (RAF) terrorist, gunshot
- Shauna Grant (1984), American porn actress, gunshot
- Larry Grey (1951), English magician and actor, gunshot
- Walter Groß (1945), German physician, politician, eugenicist and race theorist
- Carl Großmann (1922), German serial killer, hanging

=== H ===
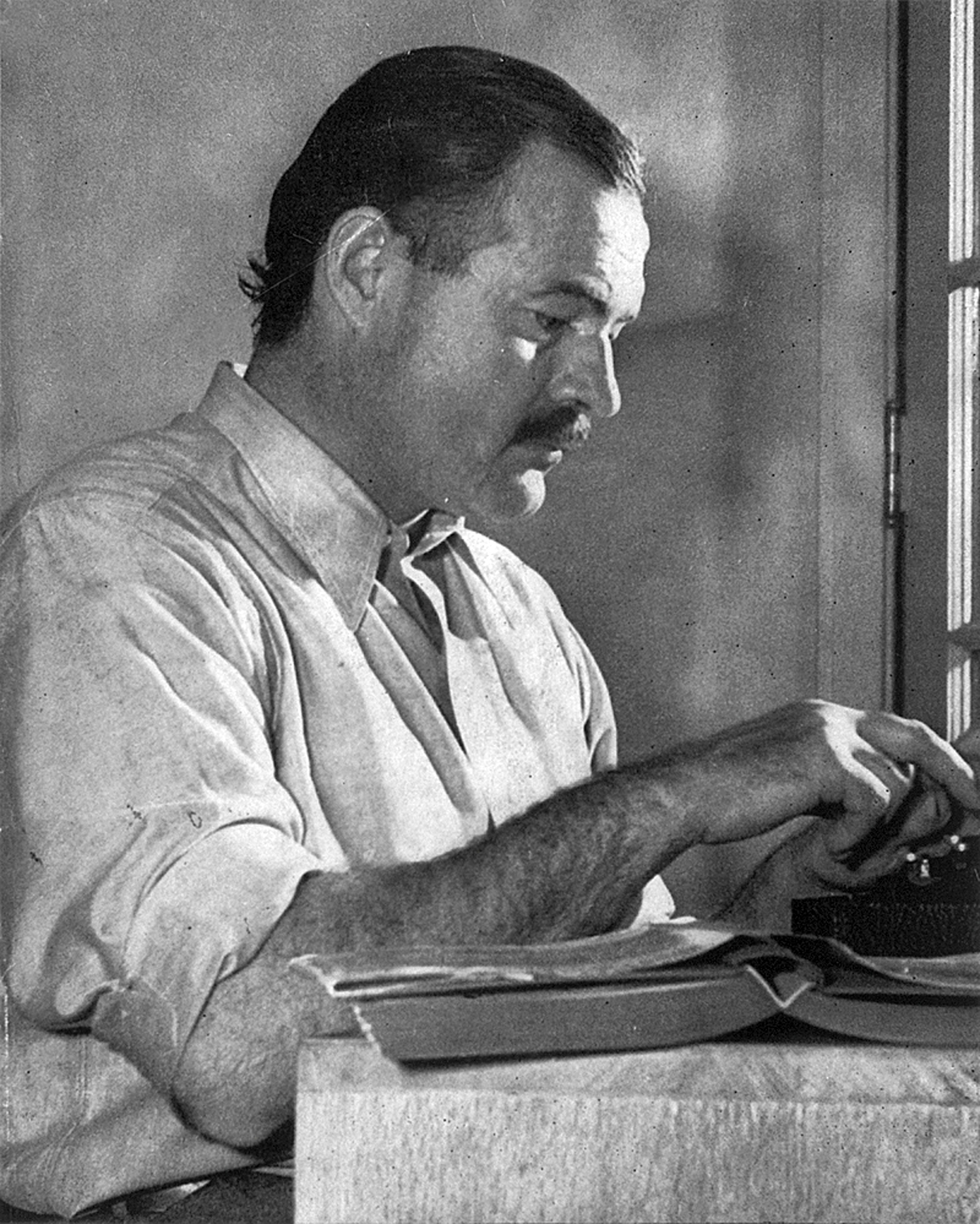
Ernest Hemingway

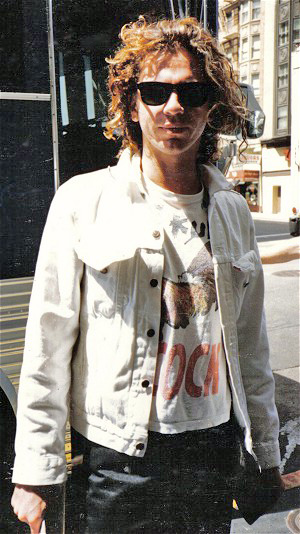
Michael Hutchence

- Lillian Hall-Davis (1933), English actress, carbon monoxide poisoning and cut throat
- Kenneth Halliwell (1967), took sleeping pill overdose after murdering his partner Joe Orton.
- Pete Ham (1975), Welsh singer-songwriter and guitarist for the band Badfinger, hanging
- Bernardine Hamaekers (1912), Belgian opera singer, cut throat with shattered drinking glass
- Rusty Hamer (1990), American actor, gunshot
- Lois Hamilton (1999), American model and actress, overdose of sleeping pills
- Tony Hancock (1968), English comedian, overdose by vodka and amphetamines
- Marlia Hardi (1984), Indonesian actress, hanging
- Eric Harris (1999), one of the two American high school seniors who committed the Columbine High School massacre, gunshot
- Brynn Hartman (1998), wife of comedian and actor Phil Hartman, shot herself after murdering Hartman
- Elizabeth Hartman (1987), American actress, leapt out of fifth floor window
- Maurice Harvey (1936), shot himself while of unsound mind
- Walter Hasenclever (1940), German poet and playwright, overdose of Veronal
- Charles Ray Hatcher (1984), American serial killer, hanging
- Donny Hathaway (1979), American musician, jumped from the 15th floor window of his hotel room
- Phyllis Haver (1960), American silent film actress, barbiturate overdose
- Jeanne Hébuterne (1920), French painter, jumped from window of fifth-floor apartment
- Sadegh Hedayat (1951), Iranian writer, carbon monoxide poisoning
- Ernest Hemingway (1961), American writer and journalist, gunshot to head
- Margaux Hemingway (1996), American fashion model, actress; overdose of phenobarbital
- George Hennard (1991), American mass murderer who perpetrated the Luby's shooting, gunshot
- Rudolf Hess (1987), German Nazi leader, hanging
- hide (1998), Japanese heavy metal singer, songwriter and record producer for the metal band X Japan, hanging
- Virginia Hill (1966), American mobster, sedative overdose
- Heinrich Himmler (1945), German Nazi leader, cyanide
- Leo Hirschfield (1922), Austrian-American candymaker known as the inventor of the Tootsie Roll, gunshot to the head
- Adolf Hitler (1945), Austrian-born Nazi Germany dictator, gunshot (possibly while biting down on a cyanide capsule at the same time)
- Abbie Hoffman (1989), American political and social activist, phenobarbital overdose
- Libby Holman (1971), American singer and actress, carbon monoxide poisoning
- Doug Hopkins (1993), American songwriter and lead guitarist for the band Gin Blossoms, gunshot
- Robert E. Howard (1936), American author known for his character Conan the Barbarian, gunshot to the head
- Huang Zhiheng (1986), Chinese mass murderer, cutting his wrists with a can lid
- Quentin Hubbard (1976), son of L. Ron Hubbard, gas
- Rodney Hulin (1996), American prison inmate who had been raped, hanging
- Lester C. Hunt (1954), United States Senator, gunshot
- Michael Hutchence (1997), Australian singer and songwriter (INXS), hanging
- Phyllis Hyman (1995), American singer-songwriter and actress, overdose of phenobarbital

=== I ===
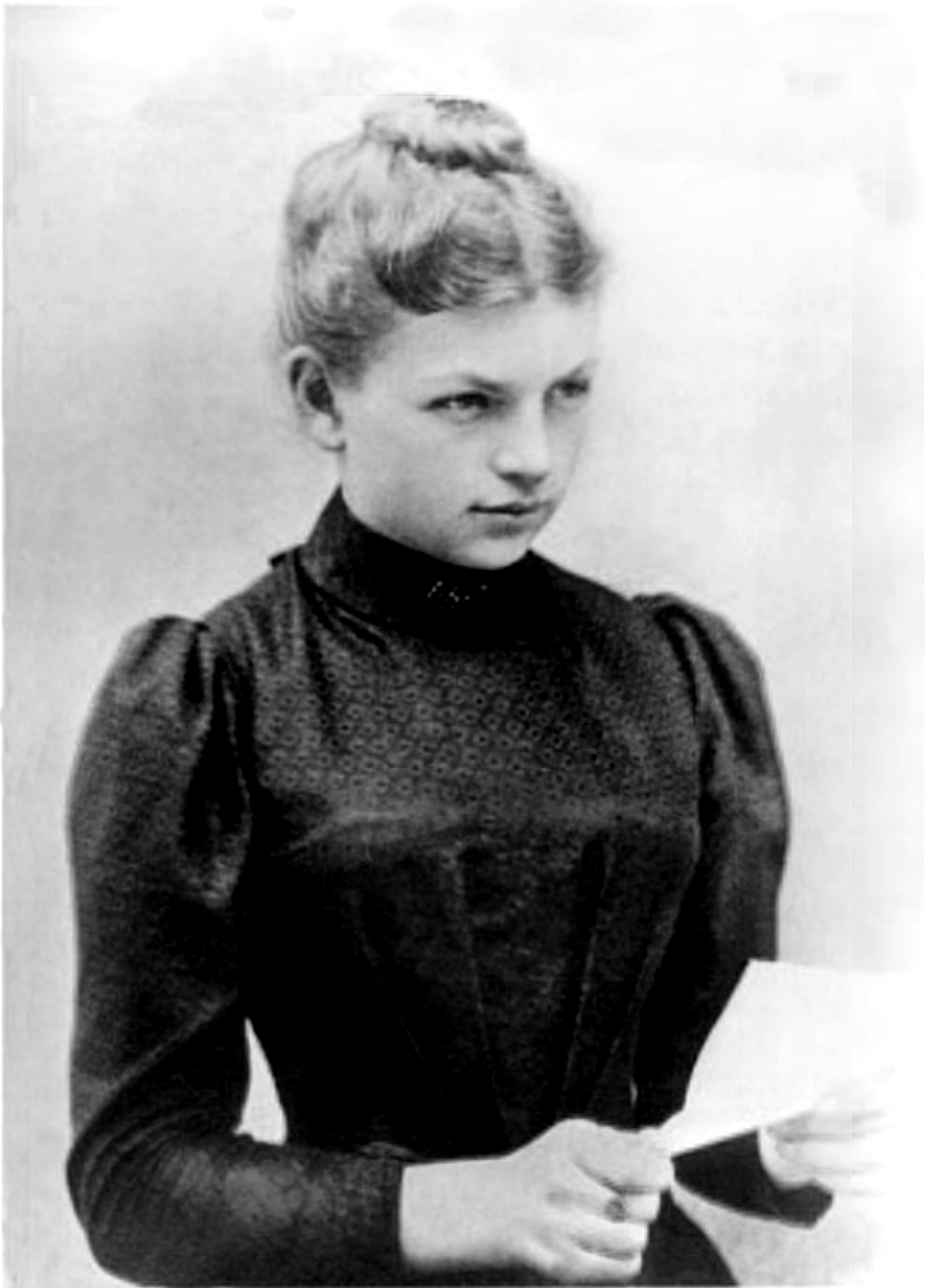
Clara Immerwahr

- Clara Immerwahr (1915), German chemist and Fritz Haber's wife, gunshot
- William Inge (1973), American writer, carbon monoxide poisoning
- Arthur Crew Inman (1963), American poet, editor and author of one of the longest diaries on record
- Juzo Itami (1997), Japanese actor and film director, jumped from building

=== J ===
- Charles R. Jackson (1968), American writer, barbiturate overdose
- Fatafat Jayalaxmi (1980), Indian actress, hanging
- Herbert Turner Jenkins (1990), longest serving police chief of Atlanta, gunshot
- Jiang Qing (1991), Chinese communist revolutionary, politician, actress, fourth wife of Mao Zedong and member of the Gang of Four, hanging
- Prince Joachim of Prussia (1920), son of Wilhelm II, German Emperor, gunshot
- Adolph Joffe (1927), Soviet revolutionary and Left Oppositionist, gunshot
- B. S. Johnson (1973), English novelist, poet, literary critic, sports journalist, television producer and filmmaker, cut his wrists
- Daniel V. Jones (1998), American maintenance worker, gunshot
- Jim Jones (1978), American cult leader and founder of Peoples Temple, gunshot
- Malcolm Jones III (1996), American comic book creator known for his work on Vertigo series The Sandman
- Ingrid Jonker (1965), South African poet, drowning
- Tor Jonsson (1951), Norwegian poet
- Luc Jouret (1994), Belgian religious leader and co-founder of Order of the Solar Temple
- Claude Jutra (1987), Canadian film director, actor and screenwriter, drowning

=== K ===
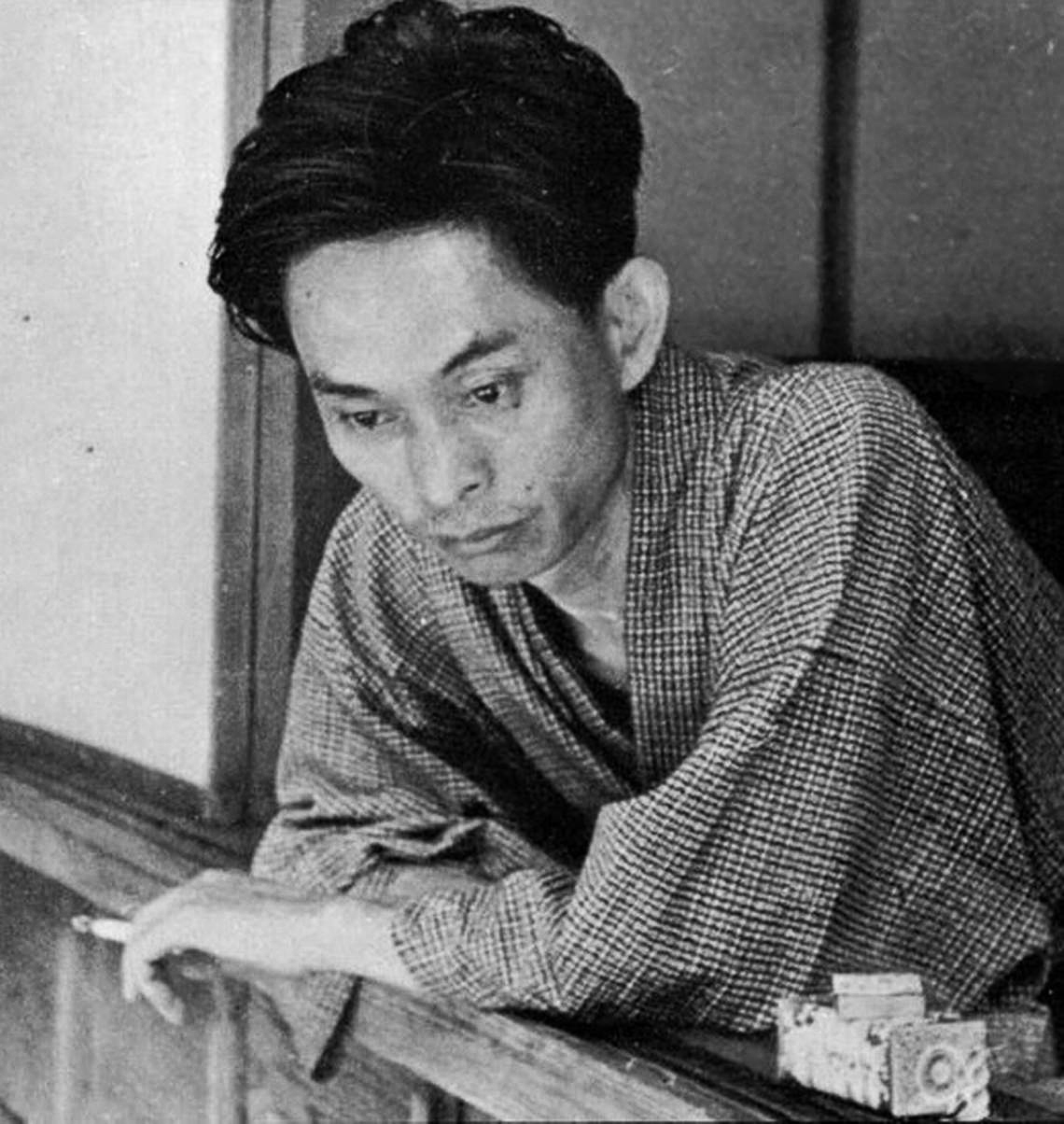
Yasunari Kawabata

- Kari Kairamo (1988), Finnish CEO and chairman of telecommunications company Nokia, hanging
- Romas Kalanta (1972), Lithuanian high school student, self-immolation
- Alexey Kaledin (1918), Russian Don Cossack general, gunshot to the heart
- Sarah Kane (1999), English writer, hanging
- Kostas Karyotakis (1928), Greek poet, gunshot
- Ricky Kasso (1984), American murderer, hanging
- Bruno Kastner (1932), German actor, hanging
- Yasunari Kawabata (1972), Japanese writer, gas inhalation
- Kawatsu Kentarō (1970), Japanese swimmer, self-immolation
- Andrew Kehoe (1927), American mass murderer, detonated truck full of dynamite while inside it
- Brian Keith (1997), American actor, gunshot
- Douglas Kelley (1958), American Military Intelligence Corps and chief psychiatrist at Nuremberg Prison during the Nuremberg trials, ingested a capsule of potassium cyanide.
- Mykola Khvylovy (1933), Soviet Ukrainian novelist, poet, publicist and national communist activist
- Kim Sung-il (1987), North Korean agent who, together with Kim Hyon-hui, was responsible for the Korean Air Flight 858 bombing, bit into a cyanide-laced cigarette
- Allyn King (1930), American actress, jumped from a fifth story window
- Syd King (1933), English footballer and football manager, ingestion of corrosive liquid
- Ernst Ludwig Kirchner (1938), German artist, gunshot
- August Kirsimägi (1933), Estonian writer, gunshot
- Ben Klassen (1993), American white supremacist and the founder of Creativity, overdose of sleeping pills
- Dylan Klebold (1999), one of the two American high school seniors who committed the Columbine High School massacre, gunshot
- Ilse Koch (1967), Nazi war criminal, hanging
- Arthur Koestler (1983), Hungarian-British author, novelist known for the antitotalitarian novel Darkness at Noon, barbiturates
- Sarah Kofman (1994), French philosopher, unknown way
- Lawrence Kohlberg (1987), American developmental psychologist, drowning
- Morris Kominsky (1975), American writer and former communist, carbon monoxide poisoning
- Fumimaro Konoe (1945), Japanese prime minister, poison
- Gé Korsten (1999), South African artist, gunshot
- Jerzy Kosiński (1991), Polish-born American writer, suffocation with plastic bag
- Milica Kostić (1974), Serbian-Yugoslavian high school student, jump from the 12th floor of a building while fleeing a rapist
- Hans Krebs (1945), German general and Chief of Staff of the OKH, gunshot
- Aleksandr Krymov (1917), Russian general, gunshot to the heart

=== L ===
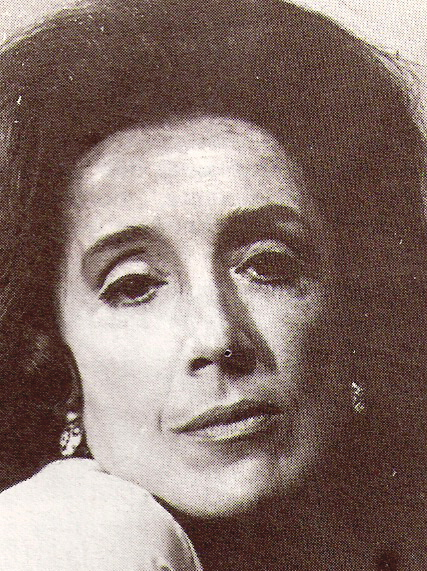
Marta Lynch

- Leonard Lake (1985), American serial killer, ingesting cyanide capsules
- Vilho Lampi (1936), Finnish painter, jumped from bridge
- Carole Landis (1948), American actress, overdose of secobarbital pills
- Jean Lanfray (1906), French labourer, hanging
- Hans Langsdorff (1939), German naval officer and Kapitän zur See, gunshot
- Anna Laughlin (1937), American actress, gas poisoning
- Margaret Laurence (1987), Canadian writer, overdose
- Florence Lawrence (1938), Canadian-American silent film actress, poisoning
- Valery Legasov (1988), Soviet-Russian inorganic chemist, member of the Chernobyl disaster commission, hanging
- Megan Leigh (1990), American pornographic actress, gunshot wound to the head
- Lemp Family (1949), Four members of the St. Louis Lemp Brewing family, gunshots
- Marc Lépine (1989), Canadian perpetrator of the École Polytechnique massacre, shot himself after killing 14 women
- Eugene Lester (1940), former Justice and Chief Justice of the Oklahoma Supreme Court, gunshot to the head
- Ephraim Lewis (1994), English singer, jumped off a fourth floor balcony
- Robert Ley (1945), German Nazi politician and leader of the German Labour Front, hanging
- Max Linder (1925), French film and stage actor, double suicide with wife Hélène "Jean" Peters, veronal and morphine ingestion, cut wrists
- Vachel Lindsay (1931), American poet, poison
- Diane Linkletter (1969), American actress and daughter of Art Linkletter, jump from a sixth story window
- Hans Litten (1938), German lawyer who represented opponents of the Nazis, hanged himself while incarcerated at Dachau concentration camp
- Philip Loeb (1955), American actor, sleeping pill overdose
- Daniele Alves Lopes (1993), teen whose jump from a building was broadcast on Brazilian national television
- Ricardo López (1996), Uruguayan-born American stalker who attempted to kill Icelandic singer Björk by sending a letter bomb, gunshot
- Karl Lütgendorf (1981), Austrian military officer and politician, Minister of Defense and figure in the Lucona affair, gunshot in the mouth
- Marta Lynch (1985), Argentine writer, gunshot

=== M ===
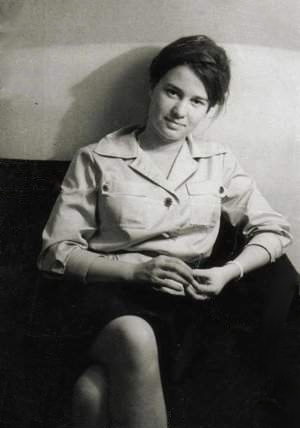
Ulrike Meinhof

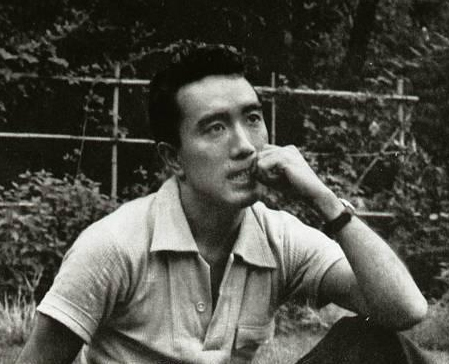
Yukio Mishima

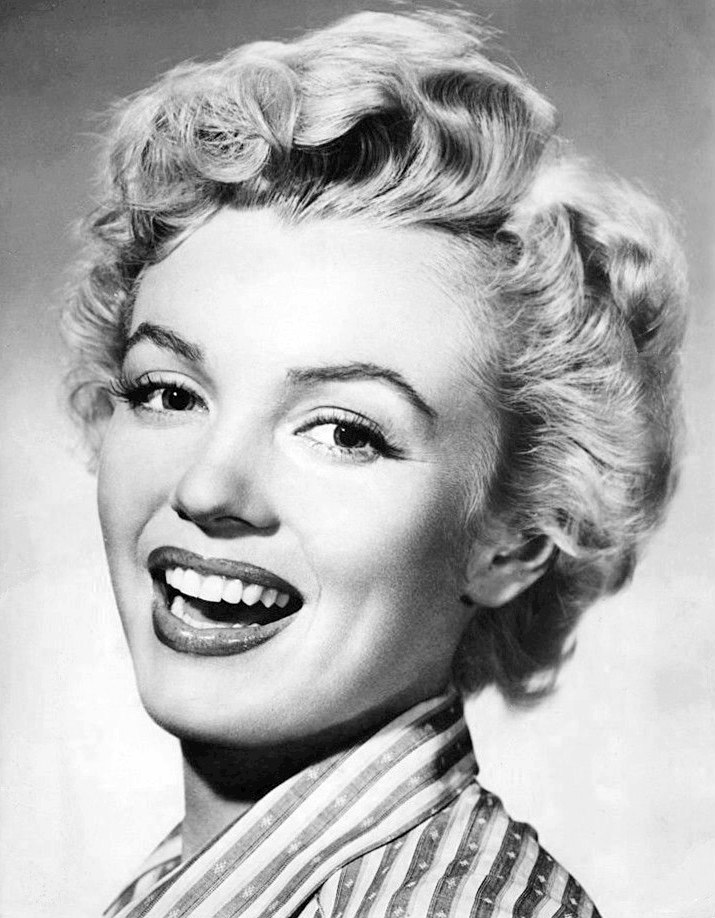
Marilyn Monroe

- Hector MacDonald (1903), British army major-general, gunshot
- Billy Mackenzie (1997), Scottish vocalist for the band The Associates, overdose of prescription drugs
- Maurice Magnus (1920), American memoirist
- Anne Maguire (1980), Irish woman who had three of her children killed by an out of control car, slit her throat and wrists
- George W. Maher (1926), American architect
- Joe Maini (1964), American jazz alto saxophonist, Russian roulette
- Donald Manes (1986), American politician, stab wound to the chest
- Arman Manookian (1931), Ottoman Empire-born Armenian and American painter
- Richard Manuel (1986), Canadian pianist and lead singer for The Band, hanging
- Simone Mareuil (1954), French actress, self-immolation
- Thalia Massie (1963), American victim of violent crime which resulted in the heavily publicized Massie Trial, barbiturate overdose
- Vladimir Mayakovsky (1930), Russian and Soviet poet, gunshot
- Kid McCoy (1940), American world champion boxer, overdose of sleeping pills
- Walt McDougall (1938), American cartoonist, gunshot
- Dan McGann (1910), American baseball player, gunshot
- Evelyn McHale (1947), American bookkeeper, subject of an iconic photograph showing her body after she jumped from an observation platform of the Empire State Building
- Tom McHale (1983), American novelist
- Robert McLane (1904), American politician, mayor of Baltimore, gunshot
- Maggie McNamara (1978), American actress, drug overdose
- Charles B. McVay III (1968), American naval officer, captain of the USS Indianapolis, gunshot to the head
- Joe Meek (1967), English record producer, gunshot
- Ulrike Meinhof (1976), German RAF terrorist, hanging
- David Meirhofer (1974), American serial killer, hanging
- Joseph Meister (1940), French caretaker who was the first person to be inoculated against rabies, gas furnace
- Kitty Melrose (1912), English stage actress and singer, carbon monoxide poisoning
- Charlotte Mew (1928), English poet, Lysol poisoning
- Walter M. Miller Jr. (1996), American writer, gunshot
- Mary Millington (1979), English model and softcore pornographic actress, overdose of clomipramine, paracetamol and alcohol
- Miroslava (1955), Czech-born Mexican actress, overdose of sleeping pills
- Yukio Mishima (1970), Japanese author, poet, playwright, film director and activist, ritual seppuku disembowelment
- Tyrone Mitchell (1984), American murderer, gunshot
- George de Mohrenschildt (1977), American petroleum geologist, CIA informant, friend of Lee Harvey Oswald and key witness for the Warren Commission, gunshot
- Marilyn Monroe (1962), American film actress, barbiturate overdose
- Haoui Montaug (1991), American nightclub doorman and cabaret promoter, secobarbital overdose
- Henry de Montherlant (1972), French writer, gunshot in the throat
- Donnie Moore (1989), American baseball player, gunshot after shooting his wife
- Emanuel Moravec (1945), Czech army officer, writer, politician and collaborator, gunshot to the head
- Masakatsu Morita (1970), Japanese political activist, stabbing per ritual seppuku disembowelment
- Ted Moult (1986), British farmer and radio and TV personality, gunshot
- Ona Munson (1955), American actress, barbiturate overdose
- David Munrow (1976), English music historian, hanging
- Francine Mussey (1933), French actress, ingestion of poison

=== N ===
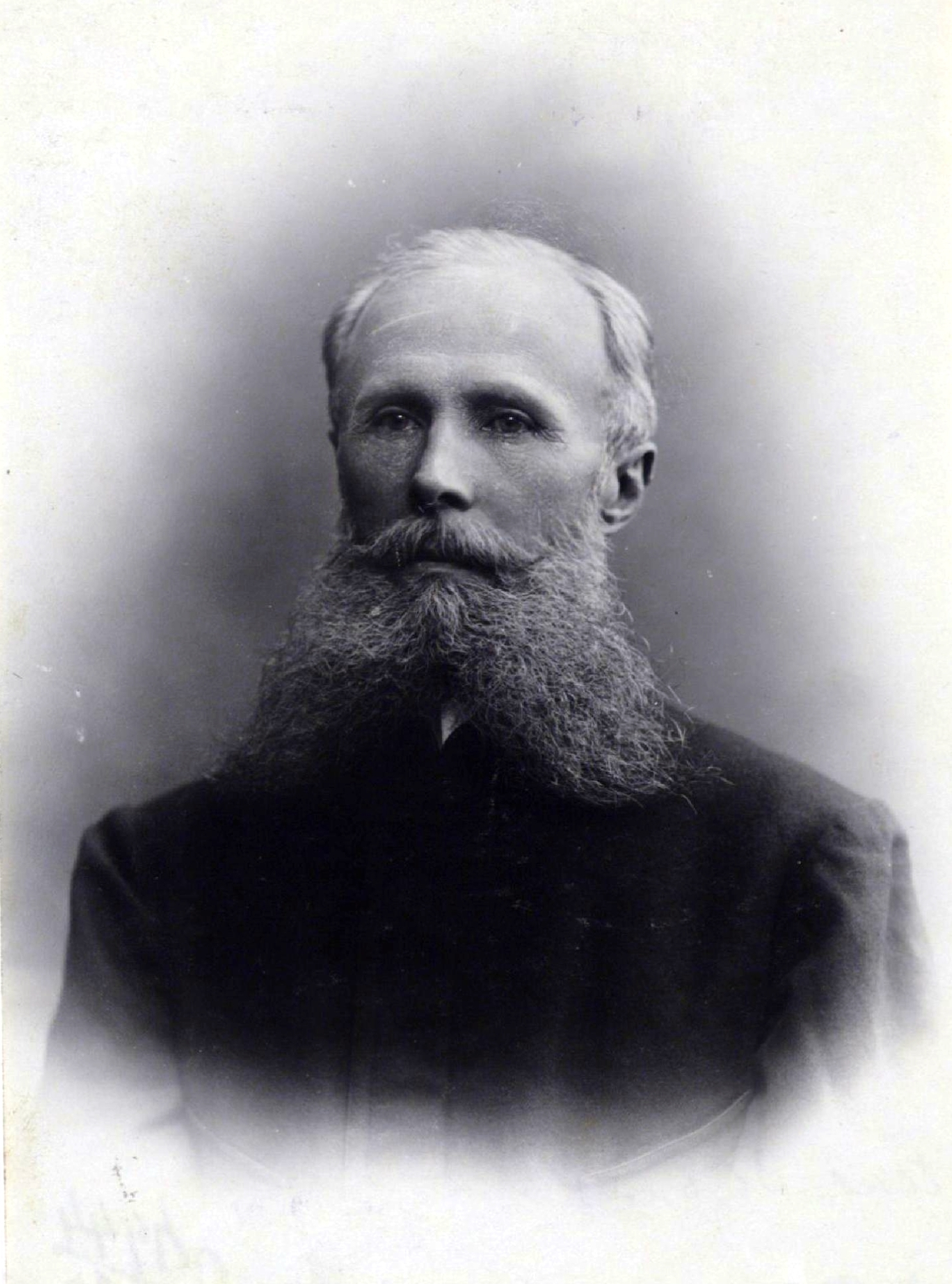
Vladimir Nalivkin

- Chūichi Nagumo (1944), Japanese admiral, gunshot
- Seigō Nakano (1943), Japanese fascist political leader and journalist, disembowelment
- Vladimir Nalivkin (1918), Russian scientist, politician, diplomat
- Scott Nearing (1983), American political activist and conservationist, by self-starvation
- Milan Nedić (1946), Serbian general, politician and prime minister of the Government of National Salvation, jumping out of a Belgrade prison window
- Nekojiru (1998), Japanese manga artist, hanging
- Klára Dán von Neumann (1963), Hungarian-American computer programmer, drowning
- Bruno Niedziela (1962), American football player
- Masa Niemi (1960), Finnish actor, drug overdose
- Frank Nitti (1943), American gangster in charge of Al Capone's strong-arm and "muscle" operations, and later the front-man for Capone's crime syndicate, gunshot to the head
- Franz Nopcsa (1933), Hungarian aristocrat, adventurer, scholar, geologist, paleontologist and albanologist, gunshot after killing companion Bajazid Doda
- Christine Norman, (1930), American stage actress, jump from building
- John Norton-Griffiths, (1930), British engineer and politician, gunshot to head

=== O ===
- Lawrence Oates (1912), British army officer, later an Antarctic explorer, he walked from his tent into a blizzard
- John O'Brien (1994), American novelist, best known for his novel, Leaving Las Vegas, gunshot to the head
- Angela O'Leary (1921), American artist, gas inhalation
- Phil Ochs (1976), American singer-songwriter, hanging
- Ogawa Kiyoshi (1945), Japanese kamikaze pilot
- Aleksandr Dmitrievich Ogorodnik (1977), Soviet diplomat and spy for the CIA, cyanide capsule
- Per "Dead" Ohlin (1991), Swedish vocalist for the Norwegian black metal band Mayhem, gunshot to the head
- Yukiko Okada (1986), Japanese singer, jumped from window
- Lembit Oll (1999), Estonian chess Grandmaster, jumped out of window
- Sergo Ordzhonikidze (1937), Soviet Bolshevik leader, member of the CPSU Politburo, the head of the Supreme Soviet of the National Economy and close associate of Joseph Stalin, gunshot

=== P ===
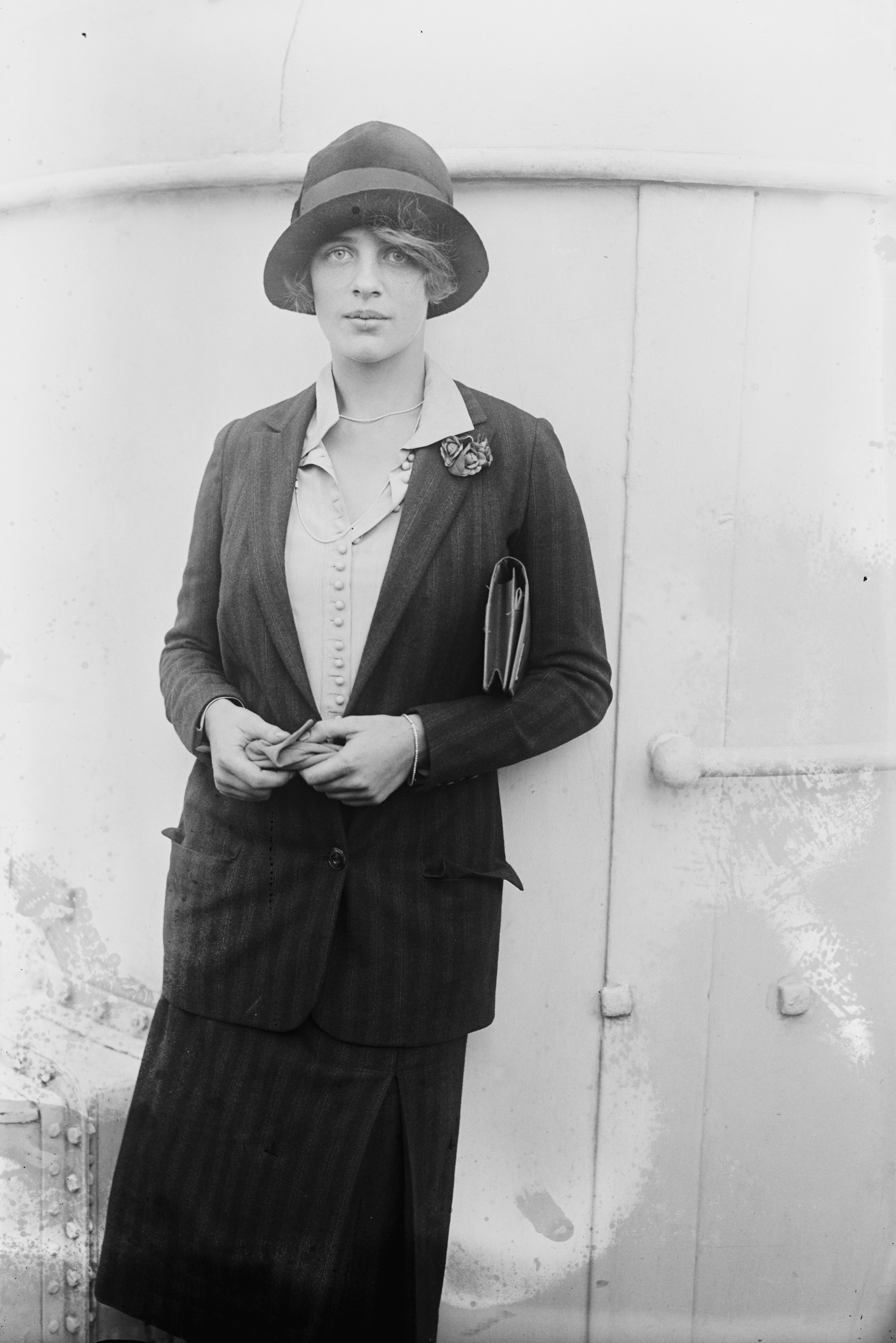
Rosamond Pinchot

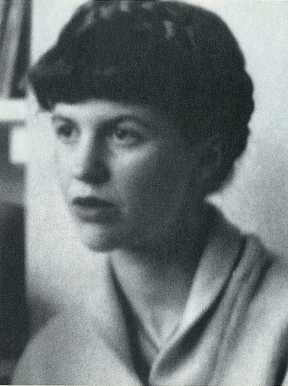
Sylvia Plath

- Jan Palach (1969), Czech student, self-immolation
- Helen Palmer (1967), American author and actress who was the first wife of famed children's author Theodor "Dr. Seuss" Geisel, barbiturate overdose
- Breece D'J Pancake (1979), American short story writer, gunshot
- Violeta Parra (1967), Chilean composer, songwriter, folklorist, ethno-musicologist and visual artist, gunshot
- Christine Pascal (1996), French actress, writer and director, jumped out of window
- Dušan Pašek (1998), Slovak ice hockey player, gunshot
- Cesare Pavese (1950), Italian author, overdose of barbiturates
- Pina Pellicer (1964), Mexican actress, overdose of sleeping pills
- Max Joseph von Pettenkofer (1901), German chemist and hygienist
- Rosamond Pinchot (1938), American actress and socialite, carbon monoxide poisoning
- H. Beam Piper (1964), American science fiction author, gunshot
- Luigi Pistilli (1996), Italian actor, hanging
- Alejandra Pizarnik (1972), Argentine poet, secobarbital overdose
- Sylvia Plath (1963), American poet, novelist, children's author, gas inhalation
- Dana Plato (1999), American child actress, notable for the TV series Diff'rent Strokes, overdose of carisoprodol and hydrocodone Plato's son, Tyler Lambert, killed himself on May 6, 2010, almost 11 years to the day after her death, via gunshot wound to the head
- Edward Platt (1974), American actor, notable for his role on the TV series Get Smart
- E. O. Plauen (1944), German cartoonist, hanging with a towel
- Michael Player (1986), American serial killer, gunshot
- Daniel Pollock (1992), Australian actor, walked in front of moving train
- C. W. Post (1914), American inventor and pioneer in the manufacturing of prepared foods, in particular breakfast cereal, gunshot
- James Edward Pough (1990), American spree killer, gunshot
- George R. Price (1975), American scientist, cutting an artery
- Pleasant Pruitt (1902), American serial killer, gunshot
- Boris Pugo (1991), Soviet politician, gunshot

=== Q ===
- Henry Quastler (1963), Austrian physician and radiologist, overdosed on pills
- Edmond Thomas Quinn (1929), American sculptor and painter, drowning
- Horacio Quiroga (1937), Uruguayan playwright, poet, and short story writer, drank a glass of cyanide

=== R ===
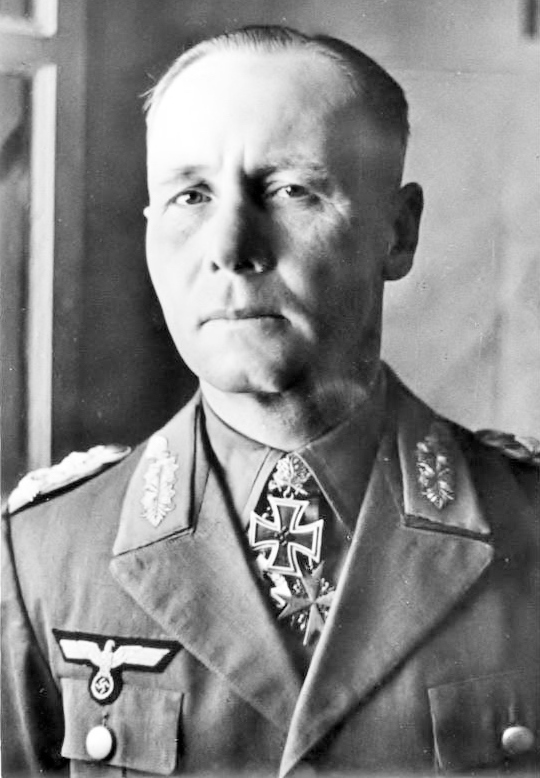
Erwin Rommel

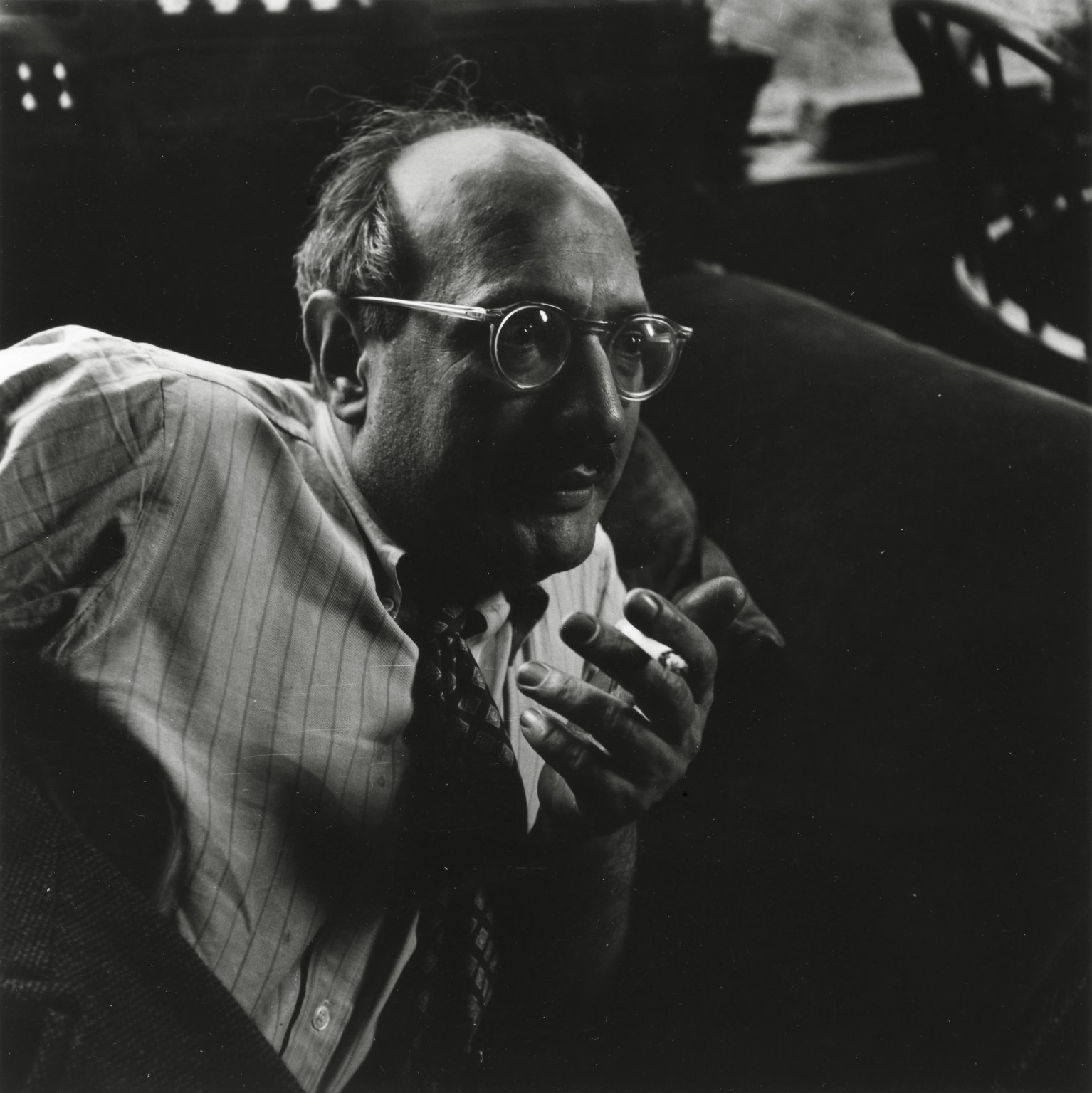
Mark Rothko

- Margarita Gil Roësset (1932), Spanish sculptor, illustrator, and poet
- Władysław Raginis (1939), Polish military commander, grenade
- Otto Rahn (1939), German medievalist, Ariosophist and Obersturmführer of the Schutzstaffel, freezing
- Carlos Rangel (1988), Venezuelan writer and journalist, gunshot
- Danny Rapp (1983), American singer and the frontman for the group Danny & the Juniors, gunshot
- David Rappaport (1990), English actor, known for the film Time Bandits, gunshot
- Jan-Carl Raspe (1977), German RAF terrorist, gunshot
- Geli Raubal (1931), niece of Adolf Hitler, gunshot
- Margaret Mary Ray (1998), American stalker, hit by a train
- Roy Raymond (1993), American founder of Victoria's Secret, jumped off the Golden Gate Bridge
- Wilhelm Rediess (1945), Nazi SS and Police Leader in Norway, gunshot
- Dean Reed (1986), American-born actor, singer-songwriter, director, and social activist who defected to communist East Germany, self drowning.
- Ernst Reicher (1936), German actor, screenwriter, film producer and film director, hanging
- Albert Relf (1937), English cricketer, gunshot
- The Renegade (1999), American professional wrestler, gunshot
- Mehmed Reshid (1919), Ottoman politician, gunshot
- Neil Roberts (1960–1982), suicide bomber who attempted to destroy the New Zealand police database at the Wanganui Computer Centre.
- Rachel Roberts (1980), Welsh actress, barbiturate and alcohol overdose and consumption of lye or alkali
- Annie Robinson (1914), British ocean liner stewardess, and survivor of the Titanic, drowning
- Robert Neal Rodriguez (1992), American serial killer, cyanide poisoning
- Erwin Rommel (1944), German general and military theorist, cyanide poisoning
- Edgar Rosenberg (1987), American film and television producer and husband of Joan Rivers, diazepam overdose
- Frank Rosolino (1978), American jazz trombonist, shot himself after killing one son and blinding the other
- Mark Rothko (1970), American abstract expressionist painter, slit his arms
- Ruan Lingyu (1935), Chinese actress, barbiturate overdose
- Ernst Rückert (1945), German actor, hanging

=== S ===
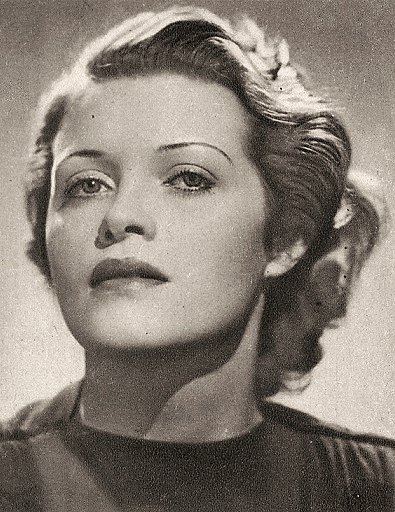
Sybille Schmitz

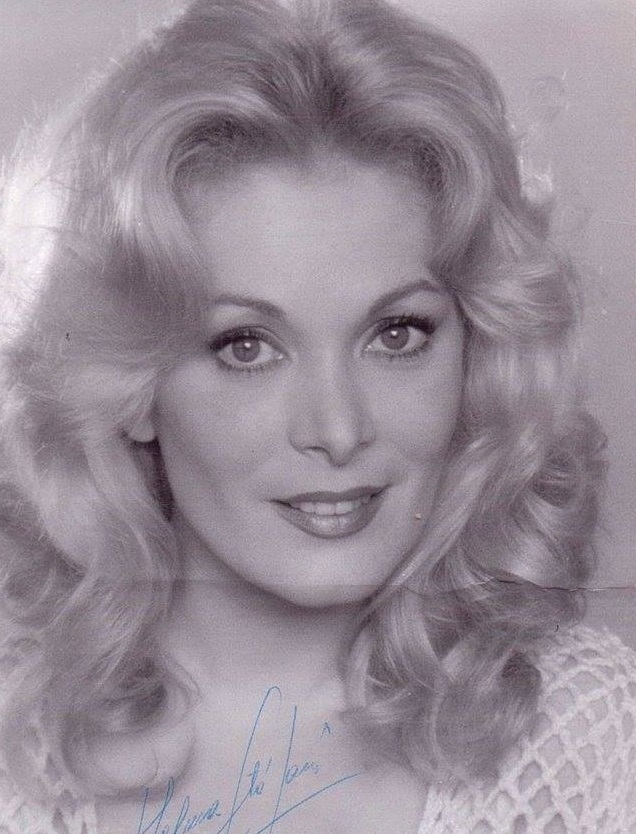
Thelma Stefani

- Mário de Sá-Carneiro (1916), Portuguese poet and short story writer, strychnine poisoning
- El Hedi ben Salem (1977), Moroccan actor, hanging
- Emilio Salgari (1911), Italian writer and creator of Sandokan, imitated seppuku
- Albert Salmi (1990), American character actor, fatally shot his wife, and himself in a murder-suicide
- Ramón Sampedro (1998), Spanish quadriplegic seaman, assisted suicide with potassium cyanide
- Alexander Samsonov (1914), Russian cavalry officer and general, gunshot
- George Sanders (1972), Russian-born English actor, singer, composer and author, overdose
- Sanmao (1991), Taiwanese writer and translator, hanged with silk stockings
- Mónica Santa María (1994), Peruvian model and TV presenter, gunshot
- Alberto Santos-Dumont (1932), Brazilian aviation pioneer, hanging
- Jiro Sato (1934), Japanese tennis player, drowning
- Savannah (1994), American adult film actress, gunshot to the head
- Eugen Schauman (1904), Finnish national activist, gunshot
- Alexandros Schinas (1913), Greek assassin of King George I of Greece, jumped out of a Thessaloniki police station window
- Sybille Schmitz (1955), German actress, overdose of sleeping pills
- Konrad Schumann (1998), East German soldier who famously defected to West Germany during the construction of the Berlin Wall, hanging
- Scott Scurlock (1996), American bank robber, gunshot to the head
- Jean Seberg (1979), American actress, barbiturate overdose
- Sonia Sekula (1963), Swiss painter, hanging
- Arma Senkrah (1900), American violinist, gunshot
- Rezső Seress (1968), Hungarian pianist and composer, choked himself with a wire
- Anne Sexton (1974), American poet, carbon monoxide poisoning
- Frances Ford Seymour (1950), Canadian-American socialite, cut her throat
- Shahrzad (1937), Iranian dramatist and playwright
- Del Shannon (1990), American musician, gunshot
- H. James Shea Jr. (1970), American politician, gunshot
- Alice Bradley Sheldon (James Tiptree Jr.) (1987), American writer, gunshot
- Shoba (1980), Indian actress, hanging
- Manuel Fernández Silvestre (1921), Spanish general, gunshot
- Per Sivle (1904), Norwegian poet and novelist, gunshot
- Mykola Skrypnyk (1933), Ukrainian Bolshevik leader, gunshot
- Austra Skujiņa (1932), Latvian poet, jump from a bridge
- Walery Sławek (1939), Polish Prime Minister, gunshot []
- Walter Slezak (1983), Austrian actor, gunshot
- Everett Sloane (1965), American actor, drug overdose
- Austin J. Small (1929), British popular writer "Seamark", gas inhalation
- James Vinton Smith (1952), Australian politician, gunshot
- Jess Smith (1923), American political advisor, entrepreneur and member of the Ohio Gang, gunshot to the head
- Nicolas de Staël (1955), French painter, leapt from his eleventh story studio terrace
- Frank Stanford (1978), American poet, gunshot
- Thelma Stefani (1986), Argentine vedette, actress, and dancer, jumping
- Wilhelm Stekel (1940), Austrian physician and psychologist, Aspirin overdose
- Inger Stevens (1970), Swedish-American actress, barbiturate overdose
- John Stevens (1923), English cricketer, jumped in front of moving train
- Jay Stewart (1989), American television and radio announcer, gunshot
- Wanda Stopa (1924), Polish-American lawyer and murderer, cyanide poisoning
- Alfonsina Storni (1938), Argentine poet, drowning
- David Stove (1994), Australian philosopher, hanging
- Otto Strandman (1941), Estonian politician, gunshot
- Mel Street (1978), American country singer, gunshot
- David Strickland (1999), American actor, best known as Todd Stites in Suddenly Susan, hanging
- Ludwig Stumpfegger (1945), German doctor and Adolf Hitler's personal surgeon, cyanide poisoning
- Sungdare Sherpa (1989), Nepalese Sherpa mountaineer
- Roy Sullivan (1983), American park ranger known for being struck by lightning seven times, gunshot
- David Edward Sutch (1999), English musician also known as Screaming Lord Sutch, hanging
- Péter Szondi (1971), Hungarian-German philologist and literary scholar, drowning

=== T ===
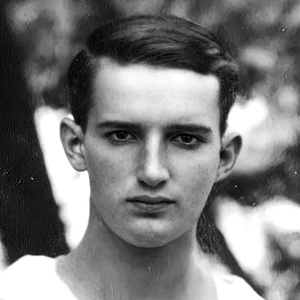
Jack Thayer

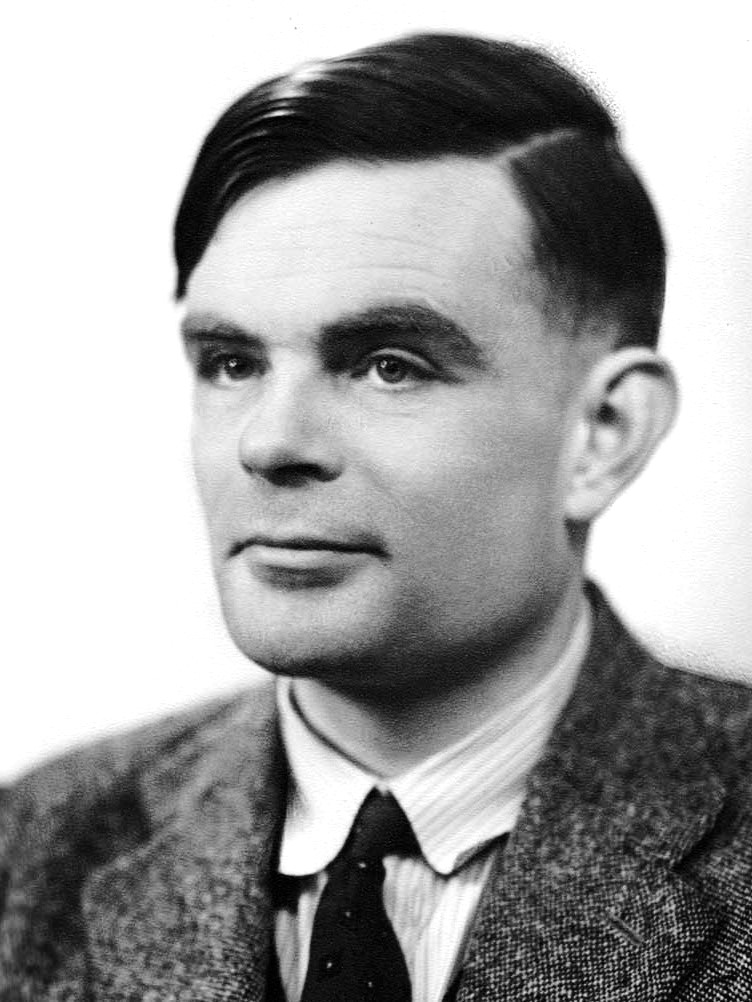
Alan Turing

- Sinedu Tadesse (1995), Ethiopian murderer, hanging
- Jahangir Tafazzoli (1990), Iranian journalist and politician
- Yutaka Taniyama (1958), Japanese mathematician
- Jean Tatlock (1944), American physician, psychiatrist, communist activist, mistress of Robert Oppenheimer, drowning in a bathtub
- Victor Tausk (1919), Austrian psychoanalyst and neurologist, gunshot and hanging
- Pál Teleki (1941), Prime Minister of the Kingdom of Hungary, gunshot
- Lou Tellegen (1934), Dutch actor, director and screenwriter, stabbed himself in the chest with a pair of scissors
- Josef Terboven (1945), Nazi Reichskommissar for Norway, detonating 50 kg of dynamite
- Jack Thayer (1945), Titanic survivor, cut his wrists
- Thích Quảng Đức (1963), Vietnamese Mahayana Buddhist monk, self-immolation
- Hugo Thimig (1944), Austrian actor, overdose of barbital
- Nicky Thomas (1990), Jamaican reggae singer
- Carlos Tobalina (1989), Peruvian-born pornographic filmmaker and actor, gunshot
- Li Tobler (1975), Swiss actress, model and life partner of artist H. R. Giger, gunshot
- Ernst Toller (1939), German playwright, socialist revolutionary and politician, hanging
- Radka Toneff (1982), Norwegian jazz singer, overdose of sleeping pills
- John Kennedy Toole (1969), American novelist known for A Confederacy of Dunces, carbon monoxide poisoning
- Silvanus Trevail (1903), English architect, gunshot
- Tron (1998), German hacker, hanging
- Yordan Tsitsonkov (1926), Macedonian Bulgarian assassin, hanged himself
- Kōkichi Tsuburaya (1968), Japanese marathoner, cut his wrists
- Marina Tsvetaeva (1941), Russian poet, hanging
- Kurt Tucholsky (1935), German journalist, satirist and writer, overdose of sleeping pills
- Alan Turing (1954), English mathematician, logician, cryptanalyst and computer scientist, eating an apple laced with cyanide
- Helen Twelvetrees (1958), American actress, overdose of sedatives
- Jim Tyrer (1980), American football player, gunshot
- Peter Tyrrell (1967), Irish writer and activist, self-immolation

=== U ===
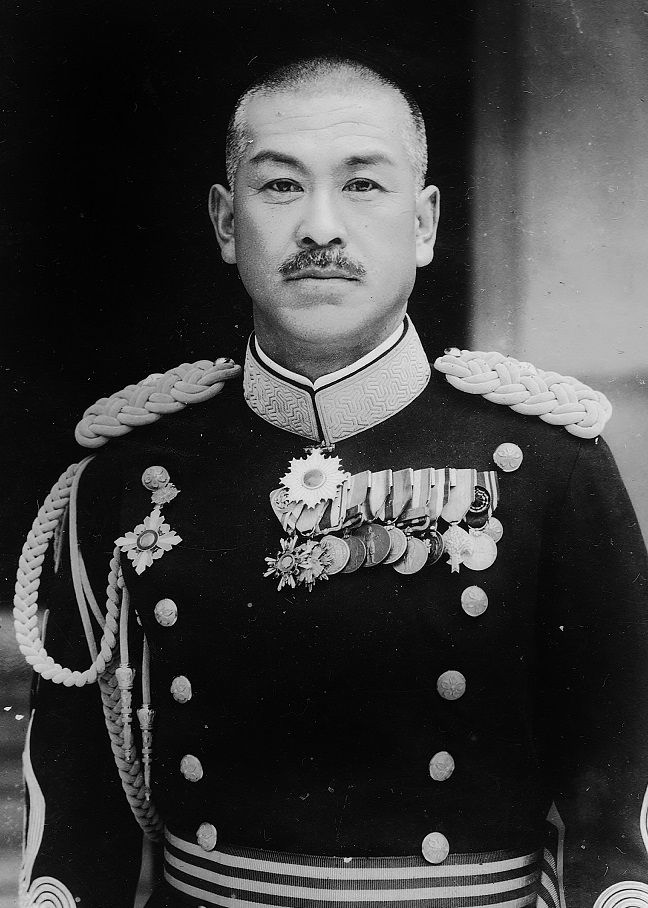
Mitsuru Ushijima

- Ernst Udet (1941), German pilot and air force general, gunshot to the head
- Ugaki Matome (1945), Japanese admiral, diarist and the last kamikaze pilot, unsuccessfully attempted a kamikaze attack after Japan had already surrendered, likely crashing into the sea
- Jack Unterweger (1994), Austrian serial killer, hanging
- Mitsuru Ushijima (1945), Japanese general, began to commit ritual seppuku disembowelment just before one of his adjutants decapitated him with a saber

=== V ===
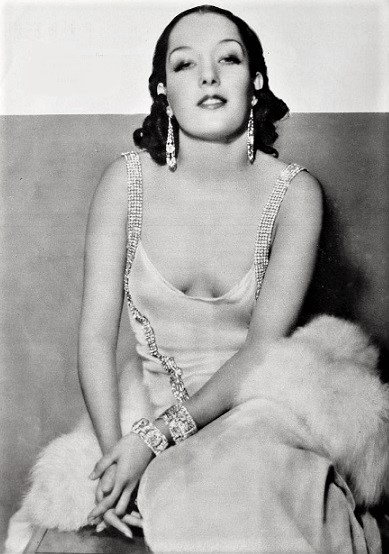
Lupe Vélez

- Dimitris Vakrinos (1997), Greek serial killer and robber, hanging
- Kelly Jean Van Dyke (1991), American adult film actress, hanging
- George Washington Vanderbilt III (1961), American explorer and member of the Vanderbilt family, jumped from the 10th floor of the Mark Hopkins Hotel
- Johannes Vares (1946), Estonian poet, doctor and politician, gunshot
- Getúlio Vargas (1954), two-time President of Brazil, gunshot
- Minnie Vautrin (1940), American missionary in China, stove gas inhalation
- Lupe Vélez (1944), Mexican actress, overdose of secobarbital
- Juhan Viiding (1995), Estonian poet and actor, cut his veins
- Hervé Villechaize (1993), French actor known for his work on the television series Fantasy Island, gunshot
- Frank Vitkovic (1987), Australian spree killer who perpetrated the Queen Street massacre in Melbourne, jumped from a window
- Peter Vogel (1978), German actor known for his main role in the Austrian television series Kottan ermittelt, overdose of alcohol and pentazocine
- Zinaida Volkova (1933), daughter of Leon Trotsky, gas asphyxiation
- Chris Von Erich (1991), professional wrestler, gunshot to the head
- Kerry Von Erich (1993), professional wrestler, gunshot to the chest
- Mike Von Erich (1987), professional wrestler, overdose of Placidyl and alcohol

=== W ===
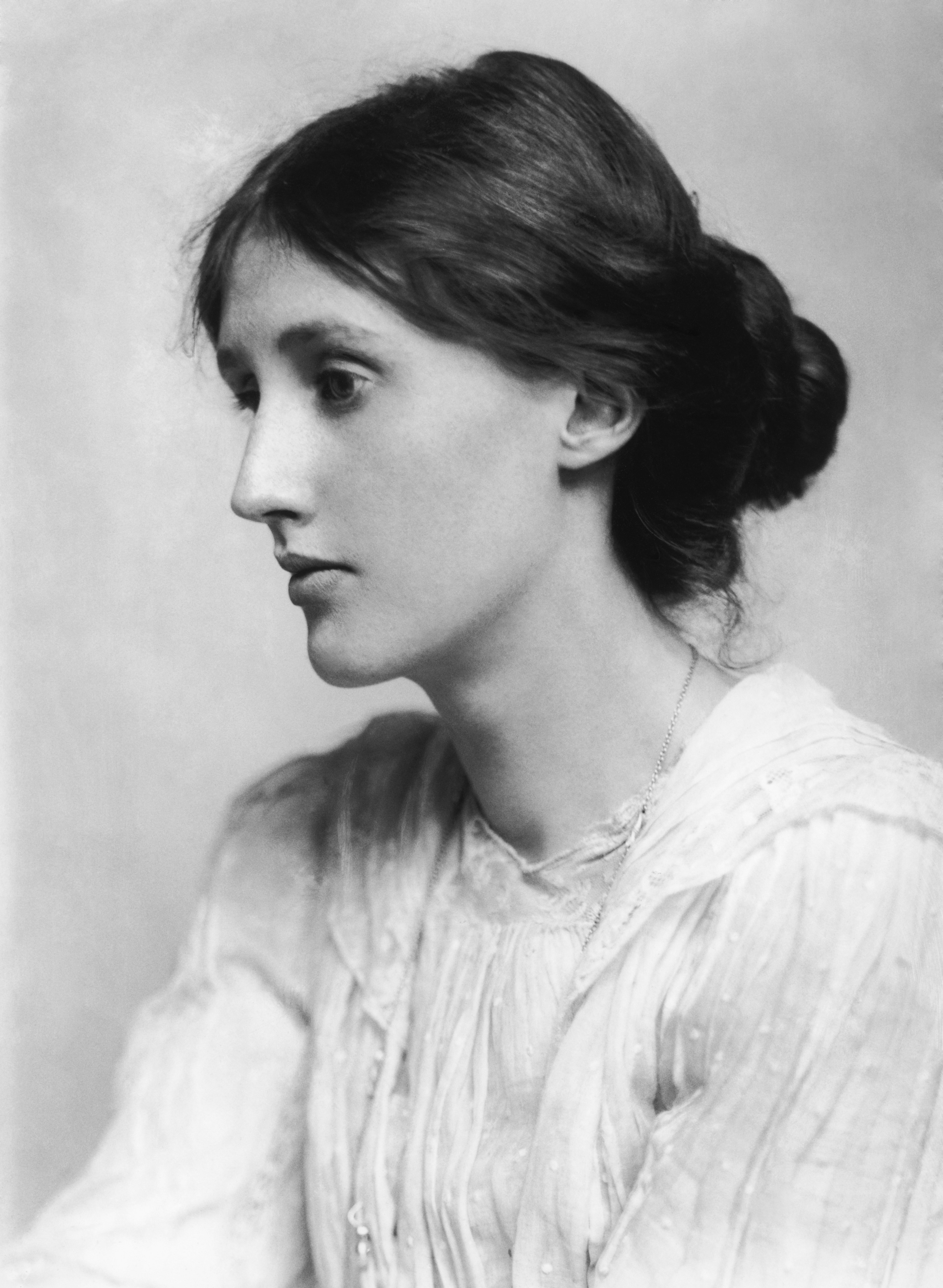
Virginia Woolf

- Gustav Wagner (1980), Austrian SS-Oberscharführer and deputy commander of Sobibor extermination camp, knife wound
- Chuck Wagon (1981), American musician and member of The Dickies
- David Wallace (1904), father of United States First Lady Bess Truman, gunshot to the head
- Marie Walcamp (1936), American actress, gas inhalation
- Stephen Ward (1963), English osteopathic physician and one of the central figures in the 1963 Profumo affair, overdose of sleeping pills
- John William Warde (1938), American bank clerk known for spending 14 hours on a ledge before jumping from the 17th floor of Manhattan's Gotham Hotel
- Ed Warren (1963), American actor, politician and former mayor of Cheyenne, Wyoming, carbon monoxide poisoning
- Nick Wasicsko (1993), former Mayor of Yonkers, New York (1987–89), gunshot to the head
- Jaromír Weinberger (1967), Czech/American composer, lethal overdose of sedative
- Otto Weininger (1903), Austrian philosopher, gunshot
- Dorrit Weixler (1916), German film actress, hanging
- Fred West (1995), English serial killer, hanging
- Assia Wevill (1969), German-born lover of English poet Ted Hughes, murder–suicide of her daughter with Hughes, gas
- James Whale (1957), English director, drowning
- Dan White (1985), San Francisco politician who assassinated Mayor George Moscone and Harvey Milk, carbon monoxide poisoning
- Kurt-Werner Wichmann (1993), German suspected serial killer and main suspect in the Göhrde murders, hanging
- Ronnie Williams (1997), Welsh entertainer
- Rozz Williams (1998), American musician, lead vocalist for Christian Death, hanging
- Wendy O. Williams (1998), American singer-songwriter for the Plasmatics, gunshot
- Christopher Wilmarth (1987), American sculptor, hanging
- Sheree Winton (1976), English actress, barbiturate overdose
- Frank Wolff (1971), American actor, slashed his throat
- Bum-kon Woo (1982), South Korean policeman and spree killer
- Wally Wood (1981), American comic book writer and artist, gunshot
- Francesca Woodman (1981), American photographer, jumped from a window
- Virginia Woolf (1941), English author, essayist, and publisher, drowning

=== Y ===
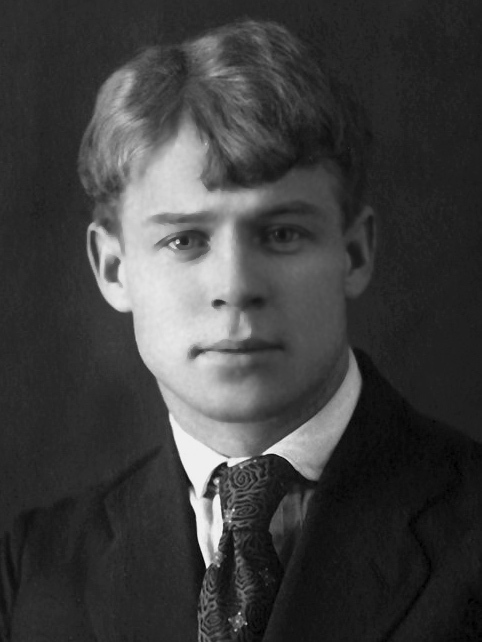
Sergei Yesenin

- Otoya Yamaguchi (1960), Japanese nationalist who assassinated Inejirō Asanuma, hanging
- Seizō Yasunori (1945), Japanese kamikaze pilot, flew his plane into the USS Bunker Hill
- Kelly Yeomans (1997), English bullied high school student, dextropropoxyphene overdose
- Sergei Yesenin (1925), Russian and Soviet poet, hanging
- Francis Parker Yockey (1960), American neo-Fascist political philosopher and polemicist also known under his pen name Ulick Varange, cyanide poisoning
- Youlan (Gūwalgiya) (1921), Manchu noblewoman, primary consort of Zaifeng, Prince Chun and mother of China's last emperor Puyi, opium overdose
- Cy Young (1964), Chinese-American animator, barbiturate overdose
- Faron Young (1996), American country music singer, gunshot
- Gig Young (1978), American actor, gunshot after fatally shooting his wife

=== Z ===
- Bogdan Žerajić (1910), Herzegovinian Serb student and nationalist revolutionary, who made an assassination attempt on the Governor of Bosnia and Herzegovina Marijan Varešanin, gunshot
- Hai Zi (1989), Chinese poet, lying down on railroad tracks
- Alexander Ziegler (1987), Swiss author and actor, overdose of tranquilizers
- Marion Zioncheck (1936), American congressman from Washington's 1st district, jumped from his office window
- Stefan Zweig (1942), Austrian novelist, playwright, journalist and biographer, barbiturate overdose

== Possible or disputed ==
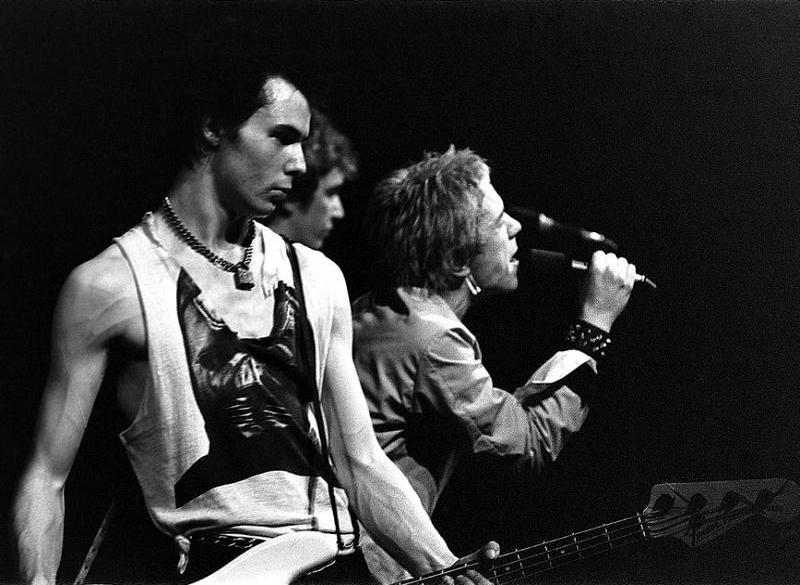
Sid Vicious

- Gameel Al-Batouti (1999), Egyptian pilot of Egyptair and former officer of the Egyptian Air Force who was killed in the crash of EgyptAir Flight 990. It is disputed on whether or not it was caused by mechanical malfunction or by Al-Batouti in a suicide by pilot
- Scotty Beckett (1968), American actor, an overdose of either barbiturates or alcohol, after seeking medical attention for blunt force trauma injuries following a severe beating
- Edward Brittain (1918), British army captain, gunshot by enemy sniper, to whom Brittain may have deliberately exposed himself, to avoid a court-martial for homosexuality
- Danny Casolaro (1991), Freelance writer investigating numerous American government agencies at the time of his death, slashed wrists in hotel bathtub.
- Richey Edwards (1995), Welsh Musician, jumping from the Severn Bridge. Disappeared on February 1, 1995, and was never seen again. Even though he has been reportedly seen at a market in Goa, India, and on the Canary Islands in Spain, the most likely theory is that he committed suicide.
- James Forrestal (1949), First U.S. Secretary of Defense, Secretary of the Navy, fell from 16th floor of building (disputed suicide)
- Kurt Gödel (1978), Austrian-American logician, mathematician and philosopher, died of starvation as a result of refusing to eat anything not prepared by his wife, who was hospitalized, out of fear of being poisoned. It is unclear whether this was a suicide.
- Nigel Green (1972), English actor, overdose of sleeping pills
- Ho Ka-i (1953), Soviet and North Korean politician and operative, officially died of suicide by gunshot but an assassination also seems likely.
- Sung-jae Kim (1995), South Korean singer and former member of Deux, stabbed in the arm 28 times with a syringe containing animal anesthetic. It is unknown if it was a murder or suicide.
- David Koresh (1993), American leader of the Branch Davidians, gunshot. It is unknown if he was murdered by one of the Branch Davidians, or if he died by suicide.
- Primo Levi (1987), Italian chemist, writer and Holocaust survivor, jumped from his third-story apartment
- Gilbert N. Lewis (1946), American chemist, cyanide poisoning. It is disputed whether he had a heart attack or died by suicide.
- Unity Mitford, (1948), British socialite and Nazi sympathiser, died eight years after shooting herself of injuries caused by the bullet; debatable if this counts as suicide.
- Alighiero Noschese (1979), Italian TV impersonator, gunshot while being recovered under care for clinical depression. As patients with depression are not permitted to possess firearms and other lethal objects, it was suspected that someone murdered Noschese or smuggled the gun to him.
- Giuseppe Pinelli (1969), Italian anarchist, fall from police station window, police claim of suicide widely disputed
- Freddie Prinze (1977), American actor and comedian, gunshot to the head while under the influence of methaqualone and alcohol. His death was initially ruled suicide, but his mother and other loved ones successfully convinced a court to change the official cause of death to accidental.
- Luigi Tenco (1967), Italian singer-songwriter, gunshot during the week of the Sanremo Music Festival 1967. Officially ruled as suicide based on an apparent suicide note, although the claim has been disputed and multiple investigations have had inconclusive outcomes.
- Tsarong (1959), Tibetan diplomat, court official and reformer, died in a Chinese prison shortly before his public execution with no cause of death ever being revealed, his friend Heinrich Harrer suspects suicide.
- Sid Vicious (1979), English musician and member of the Sex Pistols, heroin overdose. He had made a suicide pact with his then recently deceased girlfriend, Nancy Spungen, as evident by a note found in his coat pocket after his death.

== See also ==
- List of suicides
- List of suicides (BC)
- List of suicides (1–999 AD)
- List of suicides (1000–1899)
- List of suicides (2000–present)
- List of deaths from drug overdose and intoxication
