= Skuja =

Origin
- Origin: Latvian
- Meaning: "needle"

Other names
- Variant form: Skujiņš/Skujiņa

Skuja is a Latvian surname, derived from the Latvian word for "needle". Individuals with the surname include:

- Edgars Skuja (born 1966), Latvian diplomat
- Heinrich Leonhards Skuja (1892–1972), Latvian botanist and algologist

== See also ==
- Skujiņš
- Skujiņa
