= Skujiņa =

Skujiņa is a surname. Notable people with the surname include:

- Austra Skujiņa (1909–1932), Latvian poet
- Laura Skujiņa (born 1987), Latvian wrestler
- Rūta Skujiņa (1907–1964), Latvian poet
