= Rūta Skujiņa =

Latvian poet

Rūta Skujiņa (28 May 1907 – 16 April 1964) was a Latvian poet. She was the sister of Austra Skujiņa.

== Bibliography ==
- "Kuģi" (1935)
- "Zvaigžņu bērni" (1937)
- "Putni" (1947)
- "Vējš svaida kaijas" (1964)
