= Skujiņš =

Skujiņš (feminine: Skujiņa) is a Latvian surname. Notable people with the surname include:

- Toms Skujiņš (born 1991), Latvian road racing cyclist
- Zigmunds Skujins (1926–2022), Latvian writer
