= Dimitris Vakrinos =

Greek serial killer

- Born: 1961; Pyri, Kingdom of Greece
- Died: 12 May 1997 (aged 35–36); Korydallos Prison, Korydallos, Greece
- Cause of death: Suicide by hanging
- Conviction: Murder

Details
- Victims: 5
- Span of crimes: 1987–1995
- Country: Greece
- State: Athens
- Date apprehended: 6 April 1997

Dimitris Vakrinos (Greek: Δημήτρης Βακρινός; 1961 – 12 May 1997) was a Greek taxi driver and serial killer, who confessed to the murder of five people for minor quarrels and the attempted murders of seven others between 1987 and 1996.

He was arrested in April 1997, and was jailed in the Korydallos Prison. On 12 May 1997, Vakrinos was found hanging by the neck from shoelaces tied to a shower head in the showers of the prison ward.

== Early life ==
Dimitris Vakrinos was born in 1961 in Pyri, the second son of the poor five-member family of Panagiotis (who was nicknamed 'Vrouvas' because of his alcohol problems) and Georgia Vakrinou. His parents were farmers, while he was a moderate student. According to testimonies from fellow villagers, Vakrinos was not very social. His father often abused him, especially while under the influence of alcohol. In 1975, at the age of 13, Vakrinos found himself in Athens, where he was a guest in the house of a friendly family and worked in a tavern in Hassia. He then trained as a welder at a technical school and was hired at the Elefsis Shipyard, where he worked until 1992. Then he began work as a taxi driver.

== Personal life ==
Vakrinos married in 1990 and got divorced only 14 months later, resulting in his ex-wife kicking him out of their home in Keratsini. He decided to take revenge on her by setting fire to his father-in-law's cottage on Salamis Island, claiming the house originally belonged to his family. In August 1996 he remarried and moved to Moschato. He did not have any children.

His relationship with his mother and his three sisters was considered normal, as opposed to his relationship with his alcoholic father, which was later characterized as abusive.

== Crimes ==
On 6 August 1987, when he was 25 years old, the first criminal activity committed by Vakrinos was recorded, but the vast majority of his crimes took place from 1993 to 1996.

=== Murders ===
- 6 August 1987: Panayiotis Gaglias (43). Gaglias was killed by being struck with an iron bar while he slept as a guest in the Vakrinos' house in Petroupoli; the latter having posted a letter to host him. The cause of the murder, according to the perpetrator, was that Vakrinos had stolen a shotgun from Gaglias, who then threatened to notify the police. To prevent that from happening Vakrinos killed him. He then moved and threw the body onto the 19th kilometre of the Argos – Tripolis highway, where it was located eight days later.
- 19 November 1993: Anastasia Simitzi (28). Vakrinos picked Simitzi up in his taxi. He suggested that she should go to a nightclub, to which she agreed. Later, when Simitzi returned and asked to be taken home, Vakrinos instead suggested she have sex with him. Simitzi refused and Vakrinos took her to a deserted area near Mandra, where he doused her in petrol and burned her alive. Her charred corpse was found the following day.
- 9 January 1994: Theodoros Andreadis (35). Andreadis was a fellow taxi driver who quarrelled with Vakrinos a few months earlier for a priority in the taxi rank in Elefsis. To take revenge, Vakrinos posed as a client, entering the taxi of the victim who, months after the incident, did not recognize him, and Vakrinos asked to be taken to Corinth. In the first kilometre of Isthmos – Loutrakiou Vakrinos killed Andreadis with a pistol after asking him to stop. He then stole Andreadis's watch and drove the taxi to Elefsina, where he burned it. The corpse was found a few hours later.
- 21 December 1995: Kostas (21) and Antonis Spyropoulos (20). Kostas Spyropoulos had bought a used car a long time ago from Vakrinos, who tried to steal it back from the brothers' house in Acharnes. He was caught in the act and both brothers started chasing after Vakrinos. When Vakrinos stopped at a gas station, not realizing he was being tailed, the two siblings approached him asking for an explanation for the theft. Using two pistols, Vakrinos killed them on the spot.

=== Attempted murders ===
- 14 March 1993: Andrea Svyrus (18) and Theodoros Bitoulas (16). The two friends made fun of a couple during their evening walk. Vakrinos, who was nearby, overheard their comments and felt that their behaviour was unacceptable, so he shot at them many times. The two boys were seriously injured.
- 10 December 1995: George Caucas and Vassilis Doula, (both 23). That night, Vakrinos broke into a woman's car and attempted to steal several items from it, as the car's former owner had spoiled a consensus. When the two friends, who were random passers-by, tried to stop him, Vakrinos began shooting at them. Doula was slightly injured, but Caucas severely injured, remaining disabled for the rest of his life.
- 20 December 1995: Unidentified Taxi Driver. Vakrinos planned a homicide against an unidentified taxi driver with whom he had quarrelled in Moschato for taxi priority. Vakrinos had kept a phone bill and intended to hijack his rival's car. His plan failed and the next day Vakrinos decided to steal back the car he had previously sold to Kostas Spyropoulos, which resulted in the deaths of the Spyropoulos brothers.
- 31 May 1996: Nikos Agiannidis and police officers Grigoris Mammos (31) and Christos Georgantopoulos (24). Vakrinos visited Agiannidis' house on Thivon Avenue in order to take care of personal disputes with Agiannidis's son. Agiannidis did not open the door and instead called the police, forcing Vakrinos to hide in a basement in the nearby flats. When the officers arrived and the Agiannidis came out of his house, Vakrinos began shooting at them. Two of the men were slightly injured in the attack, while the third avoided injury by hiding.

=== Other criminal offences ===
- 5 December 1993: Vakrinos attempted to rob a gas station at Thebes Avenue.
- 4 December 1995: Vakrinos committed a robbery at a supermarket in Nikaia.
- 15 December 1995: Vakrinos committed a robbery at a supermarket in Aigaleo.
- 20 March 1996: Vakrinos committed a robbery at a supermarket in Aigaleo.
- June 1996: Vakrinos committed a robbery at a supermarket in Nikaia.

The attempted robbery at the gas station was done as an act of revenge; Vakrinos once had argued with an employee of that gas station over a minor offence. He did not manage to steal anything from the gas station because, even though Vakrinos shot at it several times with his pistol, the cash register did not open.

== Offender profile ==
According to police and psychological estimates, Vakrinos was described as a serial killer with a clear psychopathological background, which is mainly related to his childhood and is associated with sexual oppression, reduced self-esteem and general clustering behaviour.

Vakrinos' overreaction to any slight, resulting in an avenging fury, seemed to be a result of excessive affection and compensation for his lack of manly physique, being short in stature. Consequently, because he could not react accordingly to any challenges or insults, he responded with weapons to all presumed obstacles.

== See also ==
- List of serial killers by country
