= Suicide of Daniele Alves Lopes =

1993 youth suicide in Brazil

- Part of Suicide of Daniele Alves Lopes
- Daniele, on the building's parapet being recorded by Aqui Agora
- Date: July 5, 1993
- Venue: Centro Comercial Presidente building
- Location: República, São Paulo, Brazil; 23°32′36.87″S 46°38′22.59″W
- Type: Suicide by jumping
- Motive: Depression after a recent breakup
- Perpetrators: Daniele Alves Lopes, 16 years old
- Filmed by: Aqui Agora
- Participants: 1
- Outcome: Death of Daniele Alves Lopes
- Deaths: 1 (herself)
- Injuries: 0
- Property damage: R$ 1.05 million by Moral damages, 1994

Daniele Alves Lopes (1977 – July 5, 1993) was a Brazilian girl who jumped to her death from the Centro Comercial Presidente building in São Paulo's central business district. On July 5, 1993. The reporter Sérgio Frias from the "Aqui Agora" program, along with cameraman José Meraio, was listening to the frequency signals of the city's fire department and police. They followed the fire truck that was passing by. A citizen told the reporter that there was a girl on the ledge of the building they were on, on the street corner where they had been talking. That's when Frias saw Daniele on the ledge. She had been there about 15 minutes before the SBT team arrived. It didn't even take 30 seconds for Meraio to film the girl; before the firefighters could help her, she jumped in front of José Meraio's cameras. She died in the ambulance on the way to the hospital. The suicide was filmed by a Brazilian news show, Aqui Agora, and shown on Sistema Brasileiro de Televisão (SBT). This broadcast led to a surge in ratings and a national conversation about the sensationalized, violent, and amoral nature of the show.

== Death ==
On July 5, 1993, Daniele Lopes, despondent from a recent romantic break-up, climbed out on a seventh-story parapet of an office building where she worked as a receptionist. While she was contemplating her fate, police and a news crew arrived and started filming. The events were filmed until after the girl jumped, but the scene was cut before she reached the ground.

When the unedited footage was shown on Brazilian national television, it caused a spike in ratings. Lopes's youth and broken heart may have romanticized and contributed to the interest in the incident.

== Aftermath ==
The Brazilian psychiatrist Jacob Pinheiro Goldberg was a prominent critical voice of the broadcast, stating it may cause a societal desensitization effect, and psychoanalyst Jurandir Freire Costa referred to the media as vultures. Other communication experts were also critical. In 1994, the Alves Lopes family reached a R$ 1.05 million settlement with SBT for moral damage.
