= Robert Neal Rodriguez =

American serial killer (1950–1992)

- Born: 1950; Portland, Oregon, U.S.
- Died: May 15, 1992 (aged 42); New Mexico, U.S.
- Cause of death: Suicide by cyanide poisoning
- Conviction: N/A
- Penalty: N/A

Details
- Victims: 3
- Span of crimes: 1984–1992
- Country: United States
- State: Florida
- Date apprehended: Committed suicide before apprehension

Robert Neal Rodriguez (1950 – May 15, 1992) was an American serial killer and former police officer, responsible for murdering a woman and two girls in Florida in 1984 and 1992, respectively. Although never charged with the murders, he left a note confessing to the crimes when he committed suicide in New Mexico.

== Biography ==
=== Early life ===
Born as the son of a 22-year United States Air Force veteran, Rodriguez attended several different schools while growing up in Florida, Georgia and Alabama. He graduated high school in Fort Walton Beach, later attending Okaloosa-Walton Junior College before enrolling at Brigham Young University in Provo, Utah, where he became a Mormon.

After spending two years in Guatemala as a Mormon missionary, Rodriguez earned a law enforcement degree from Brigham Young University and was later hired by the Portland Police Bureau in March 1975, but resigned only two years later. Rodriguez then moved to Tallahassee, Florida with his mother and attended Florida State University, working as a sign-painter and janitor. He was also an active member of the Unity Church, occasionally delivering sermons there.

=== Murders ===
In June 1984, 22-year-old Valerie Hunt, a student from Tallahassee Community College, disappeared from a shopping center. No trace was found of her until three months later when her skeletonized remains were located at a sinkhole in Wakulla County.

On March 27, 1992, two 16-year-old girls from Thomasville, Georgia named Megan Carr and Cherish DeSantis, were found dead at a secluded Alligator Point beach by a police officer and his wife. The girls, who had travelled for a simple day on the beach and were still in their swimsuits, had been shot twice in the head. The bodies showed no signs of a struggle, as well as neither of them being sexually assaulted or robbed, as their purses and valuables had been left untouched.

== Investigation, suicide and discovery ==
When they discovered the bodies, the Alligator Point Homicide Task Force went on to pursue more than 100 possible leads. During this time, Rodriguez's mother had died, with him disappearing from his apartment on May 5, shortly after he was interviewed for his car, which carried a stolen Utah license plate. He then proceeded to write two letters addressed to the FDLE and another to the Arizona Daily Sun, before eventually taking his own life using cyanide at an I-40 stop in New Mexico.

Eventually, authorities decided to check out his car concerning his license plate. In their search, they found Rodriguez's body, as well as a glass vial containing white powder and a warning note on the car. The car was similar to one seen during the day of the girls' murder. His detailed confession in one of the letters, given to FDLE agent Delbert McGarvey, explained his reasonings for the murder: he had failed to rape his victims, and in order to not get caught, he killed them.

== In the media ==
The Investigation Discovery program Swamp Murders has an episode detailing the crimes committed by Rodriguez.

== See also ==
- List of serial killers in the United States
