= Austra Skujiņa =

Latvian poet

Austra Skujiņa (10 February 1909 in Vidriži parish, Governorate of Livonia – 5 September 1932 in Riga, Latvia) was a Latvian poet. She was known for her sad poems about the impossibility of love and happiness despite wanting to achieve it. Her first poem was published in 1926 in a social democrat newspaper, and during her first years she was more known more for left wing and protest poems. The first collection of her poems was published in 1932, shortly after her suicide. Skujiņa committed suicide on 5 September 1932, at the age of 23. She is buried at the Riga Forest Cemetery.
