= Suárez =

- Place of origin: Spain

Suárez is a common Spanish surname of Germanic origin, of which Juárez is an alternative form. It is widely spread throughout Latin America as a consequence of colonization. In origin it is a patronymic meaning "son of Suero" or "son of Soeiro". It may be derived from the Latin name Suerius, meaning "swineherd", in turn related to the Visigothic "surhari". The surname originates from the province of Asturias in northwest Spain. This surname is most commonly found in Mexico, Spain, Cuba, and Argentina.

== People ==
=== Arts and sciences ===
- Alex Suarez (musician) (contemporary), American bassist
- Almudena Suarez, Spanish engineer
- André Suarès (1868–1948), French writer
- Andrea Suárez (singer) (born 1979), Thai singer
- Aurelio Suárez (1910–2003), Spanish surrealist painter
- Blanca Suárez (born 1988), Spanish actress
- Bobby A. Suarez (1942–2010), Filipino film director
- Cecilia Suárez (born 1971), Mexican actress
- Claudia Suárez (born 1987), Venezuelan supermodel
- Claudio Suárez (born 1968), Mexican soccer player
- Cristóbal Suárez de Figueroa (1571–1644), Spanish writer and jurist
- Daniel Suarez (author) (born 1964), American author of Daemon
- Diego Suarez (garden designer) (1888–1974), American garden designer, of the gardens at Villa Vizcaya
- Eduardo Aldasoro Suarez (1894–1968), Mexican aviation pioneer
- Emma Suárez (born 1964), Spanish actress
- Francisco Suárez (1548–1617), Spanish philosopher and theologian
- Gastón Suárez (1929–1984), Bolivian writer
- Gonzalo Suarez (born 1934), Spanish writer and director
- Gonzo Suárez (born 1963), Spanish video game director
- Héctor Suárez (1938–2020), Mexican actor and comedian
- Héctor Suárez Gomís (born 1968), Mexican actor and singer
- Inca Garcilaso de la Vega, born Gomez Suarez de Figueroa (1539–1616), Peruvian historian and writer
- Javier Suárez (economist) (born 1966), Spanish economist
- Jeremy Suarez (born 1990), American actor
- José Suárez (actor) (1919–1981), Spanish actor
- José Suárez Carreño (1915–2002), Spanish writer
- José Ramiro Suárez Soruco (born 1939), Bolivian paleontologist
- José de Cañizares y Suárez (1676–1750), Spanish playwright
- Karla Suárez (born 1969), Cuban writer
- Luis Suárez Fernández (1924–2024), Spanish historian
- Maiquel Alejo (born Maiquel Suarez), American television game show hostess
- María Aurelia Paula Martínez Suárez, aka Silvia Legrand, (1927–2020), Argentine actress
- María Eugenia Suárez (born 1992), Argentine actress and model
- Mariano Mociño Suárez de Figueroa (1757–1820), naturalist from New Spain
- Mario Suárez (writer) (1925–1998), American writer
- Mario Suárez (singer) (1926–2018), Venezuelan singer
- Miguel Ángel Suárez (1939–2009), Puerto Rican film actor
- Ofelia Suárez Fox (1923–2006), Cuban poet, lecturer, and radio personality
- Pedro Suárez-Vértiz (born 1968), Peruvian singer-songwriter
- Rafael Vargas-Suarez (born 1972), American artist
- Ray Suarez (born 1957), American journalist, senior correspondent of the PBS program The NewsHour with Jim Lehrer
- Rosendo Ruiz Suárez (1885–1983), Cuban musician
- Santiago Rafael Armada Suárez (1937–1995), Cuban artist
- Sergio Lais-Suárez (born 1957), Argentine surgeon and oncologist
- Silvana Suárez (1958–2022), Argentine model
- Virgil Suárez (born 1962), American poet, novelist, professor

=== Business ===
- Julio Suárez, Guatemalan banker
- María de los Dolores Olmedo y Patiño Suarez (1908–2002), Mexican businesswoman, friend of Frida Kahlo and Diego Rivera
- Nicolás Suárez Callaú (1851–1940), Bolivian rubber baron
- Roberto Suárez (publisher) (c. 1928–2010), president of The Miami Herald
- Patrick de Suarez d'Aulan (born 1971), French wine producer

=== Criminals ===
- Georges Suarez (1890–1944), French journalist executed for collaborating with the Nazi occupation
- Guillermo Suárez Mason (1924–2005), Argentine military official convicted of crimes in the Dirty war
- Juan Fernando Hermosa Suárez (1976–1996), Ecuadorian teenage serial killer
- Roberto Suárez Gómez (1932–2000), Bolivian drug trafficker

=== Politics ===
- Manuel de Jesús Andrade Suárez (1860–1935) Colombian writer, journalist and politician
- Adolfo Suárez (1932–2014), Spain's first democratically elected prime minister after the dictatorship of General Francisco Franco
- Adolfo Suárez Illana (born 1964), Spanish politician, son of Adolfo
- Alejandro José Suárez Luzardo (born 1965), Venezuelan politician
- Juan Manuel Suárez Del Toro Rivero (contemporary), president of the Spanish Red Cross
- Facundo Suárez (contemporary), Argentine politician
- Fidel Suárez Cruz (contemporary), Cuban political prisoner
- Germán Suárez Flamerich (1907–1990), Venezuelan politician, president of Venezuela
- Giustina Pecori-Suárez (1811–1903), wife of Jérôme Bonaparte
- Gómez Suárez de Figueroa, 3rd Duke of Feria (1587–1634), Spanish nobleman and diplomat
- Hugo Banzer Suárez (1926–2002), Bolivian politician, president of Bolivia
- Joaquín Suárez (1781–1868), Uruguayan politician, head of state of Uruguay
- José Antonio Alonso Suárez (born 1960), Spanish politician
- José María Pino Suárez (1869–1913), Mexican politician, governor of Yucatán
- José Quiroga Suárez (1920–2006), Spanish politician, president of Galicia
- Juan Alonso de Guzmán y Suárez de Figueroa Orozco (c. 1405–1468), Spanish nobleman and military figure during the Reconquista
- Lorenzo Suárez de Mendoza, 5th Count of Coruña (c. 1518–1583), Spanish viceroy of New Spain
- Manuel de Jesús Andrade Suárez (1860–1935), Colombian politician
- Marco Fidel Suárez (1855–1927), Colombian politician, president of Colombia
- Mariano Suárez (1897–1980), Ecuadorian politician, Vice President of Ecuador
- Ramiro Suárez Corzo (born 1960), Colombian politician
- Roberto Guajardo Suárez (1918–2008), president of Copamex
- Vicente Suárez (1833–1847), Mexican defender at the Battle of Chapultepec

=== Religion ===
- Adolfo Suárez Rivera (1927–2008), Mexican cardinal and archbishop
- Federico González Suárez (1844–1917), Ecuadorian bishop and politician
- Fernando Suarez (1967–2020), Filipino priest and faith healer
- Francisco Suárez (1548–1617), Spanish Jesuit philosopher

=== Sports ===
- Albert Suárez (born 1989), Venezuelan baseball player
- Alejandro Suárez (born 1980), Mexican long-distance runner
- Andrew Suarez (born 1992), American baseball player
- Antonio Suárez (1932–1981), Spanish professional road-racing cyclist
- Arico Suárez (1908–1979), Argentine footballer
- Berthy Suárez (born 1969), Bolivian footballer
- Carla Suárez Navarro (born 1988), Spanish tennis player
- Carlos Adrián Valdez Suárez (born 1983), Uruguayan footballer
- Carlos Banteux Suárez (born 1986), Cuban boxer
- Carlos Heber Bueno Suárez (born 1980), Uruguayan footballer
- César Suárez (born 1984), Venezuelan racing cyclist
- Christian Suárez (born 1985), Ecuadorian footballer
- Claudio Suárez (born 1968), Mexican footballer
- Cristián Suárez (born 1987), Chilean footballer
- Cundi (footballer), nickname of Secundino Suárez, (born 1955), Spanish footballer
- Damián Suárez (born 1988), Uruguayan footballer
- Daniel Suárez (born 1992), Mexican racing driver
- Daniel Alberto Néculman Suárez (born 1985), Argentine footballer
- David Wladimir Serradas Suárez (born 1969), Venezuelan boxer
- Deinis Suárez (born 1984), Cuban baseball player
- Denis Suárez (born 1994), Spanish footballer
- Diego Suárez (footballer, born 1992), Bolivian footballer
- Edmundo Suárez (1916–1978), Spanish footballer and coach
- Enrique Figueroa Suárez (born 1964), Puerto Rican Olympic sailor
- Erminio Suárez (born 1969), Argentine track cyclist
- Esteban Andrés Suárez (born 1975), Spanish footballer
- Eugenio Suárez (born 1991), Venezuelan baseball player
- Guillermo Suárez (born 1985), Argentine footballer
- Guillermo Gonzalo Giacomazzi Suárez (born 1977), Uruguayan footballer
- Guillermo Sandro Salas Suárez (born 1974), Peruvian footballer
- Hugo Suárez (born 1982), Bolivian footballer
- Jairo Suárez (born 1985), Colombian footballer
- Javier Suárez (cyclist) (born c. 1939), Colombian road racing cyclist
- Jean de Suarez d'Aulan (1900–1944), French aviator, auto racer, and bobsledder
- Jeffrén Suárez (born 1988), Spanish footballer
- Jesús Manuel Bravo Suárez (born 1979), Spanish footballer
- Jorge Suárez (footballer) (1945–1997), Salvadoran footballer
- José Suárez (pitcher/outfielder), Cuban Negro league baseball player
- José Suárez (baseball, born 1998), Venezuelan baseball player
- José Luis Aragonés Suárez (1938–2014), Spanish footballer
- José Manuel Suárez (born 1974), Spanish footballer
- Julián Omar Ramos Suárez (born 1988), Spanish footballer
- Ken Suarez (1943–2023), American baseball player
- Leonel Suárez (born 1987), Cuban decathlete
- Luis Suárez (Uruguayan footballer) (born 1987), Uruguayan footballer
- Luis Suárez (footballer, born 1935), Spanish footballer and coach
- Luis Fernando Suárez (born 1959), Colombian football coach, currently coach of the Honduras national football team
- Luis Javier Suárez (born 1997), Colombian footballer
- Manny Suárez (born 1993), Chilean-Spanish basketball player
- María Ángeles Rodríguez Suárez (born 1957), Spanish field hockey player
- Maria Garcia Suarez (born 1978), Spanish sprint canoer
- Marra Suárez (born 2002), Spanish basketball player
- Matías Suárez (born 1988), Argentine footballer
- Mario Suárez (footballer) (born 1987), Spanish footballer
- Milton Fabián Rodríguez Suárez (born 1976), Colombian footballer
- Narciso Suárez (born 1960), Spanish flatwater canoer
- Nicolás Suárez (disambiguation), footballers
- Osvaldo Suárez (1934–2018), Argentine long-distance runner
- Pablo Oscar Rotchen Suárez (born 1973), Argentine footballer
- Paola Suárez (born 1976), Argentine tennis player
- Paolo Suárez (born 1980), Uruguayan footballer
- Ramon López Suárez (born 1969), Spanish basketball coach
- Ranger Suárez (born 1995), Venezuelan baseball player
- Ricardo Pedriel Suárez (born 1987), Bolivian footballer
- Robert Suárez (born 1991), Venezuelan baseball player
- Roberto Suarez Seabra (born 1976), Brazilian water polo player
- Roberto Canella Suarez (born 1988), Spanish footballer
- Roger Suárez (born 1977), Bolivian footballer
- Rolando Álvarez Suárez (born 1975), Venezuelan footballer
- Rubén Suárez (born 1979), Spanish footballer
- Ryan Suarez (born 1977), American soccer player
- Sergio A. Matto Suárez (1930–1990), Uruguayan basketball player
- Silvio Suárez (born 1969), Paraguayan footballer
- Temoc Suarez (born 1975), American soccer player
- Tony Suarez (1956–2007), American soccer player
- Yoan Pablo Hernández Suárez (born 1984), Cuban boxer
- Yeferson Suárez (born 2002), Colombian para-athlete
- Yosvany Suárez (born 1973), Cuban hammerthrower

=== Other ===
- César Suárez (prosecutor) (1985–2024), Ecuadorian prosecutor and lawyer
- Diego Suarez (navigator) (fl. 16th century), Portuguese navigator
- Gonzalo Suárez Rendón, Spanish conquistador, founder of Tunja
- Inés Suárez (c. 1507–1580), Spanish conquistadora
- Jane Suarez de Figueroa (1538–1612), Lady in Waiting to Queen Mary Tudor of England
- Juan Fernando Hermosa Suárez (1976–1996), Ecuadorian teenage serial killer
- Manuel Isidoro Suárez (1799–1846), Argentine colonel who fought against the Spanish in the wars of independence
- Teresa Meana Suárez (born 1952), Spanish feminist activist, teacher, and philologist
- Philip Suárez Barcala (born 1971), Spanish, humanitarian aid worker

=== Pseudonyms ===
- Benito Suárez Lynch, pseudonym of Jorge Luis Borges and Bioy Casares
- Suarez Miranda, pseudonym of Jorge Luis Borges

=== Fictional ===
- Betty Suarez, the main character in the TV series Ugly Betty
- Hilda Suarez, fictional character in the television show Ugly Betty
- Ignacio Suarez (Ugly Betty), fictional character in the television show Ugly Betty
- Justin Suarez, fictional character in the television show Ugly Betty
- Omar Suarez (Scarface), fictional character in the 1983 film Scarface
- Rosa Mia Suarez, fictional character in the Filipino cineseries Bituing Walang Ningning
- Frida Suárez, fictional character in the television show El Tigre: The Adventures of Manny Rivera

== See also ==
- Soares
