= Amutria =

Ancient Dacian town in Romania

- Amutrion, Amutrium, Admutrium, Ad Mutrium, Ad Mutriam
- Location within Romania
- 44.83°N 22.91°E
- Location: Mehedinți County, Romania

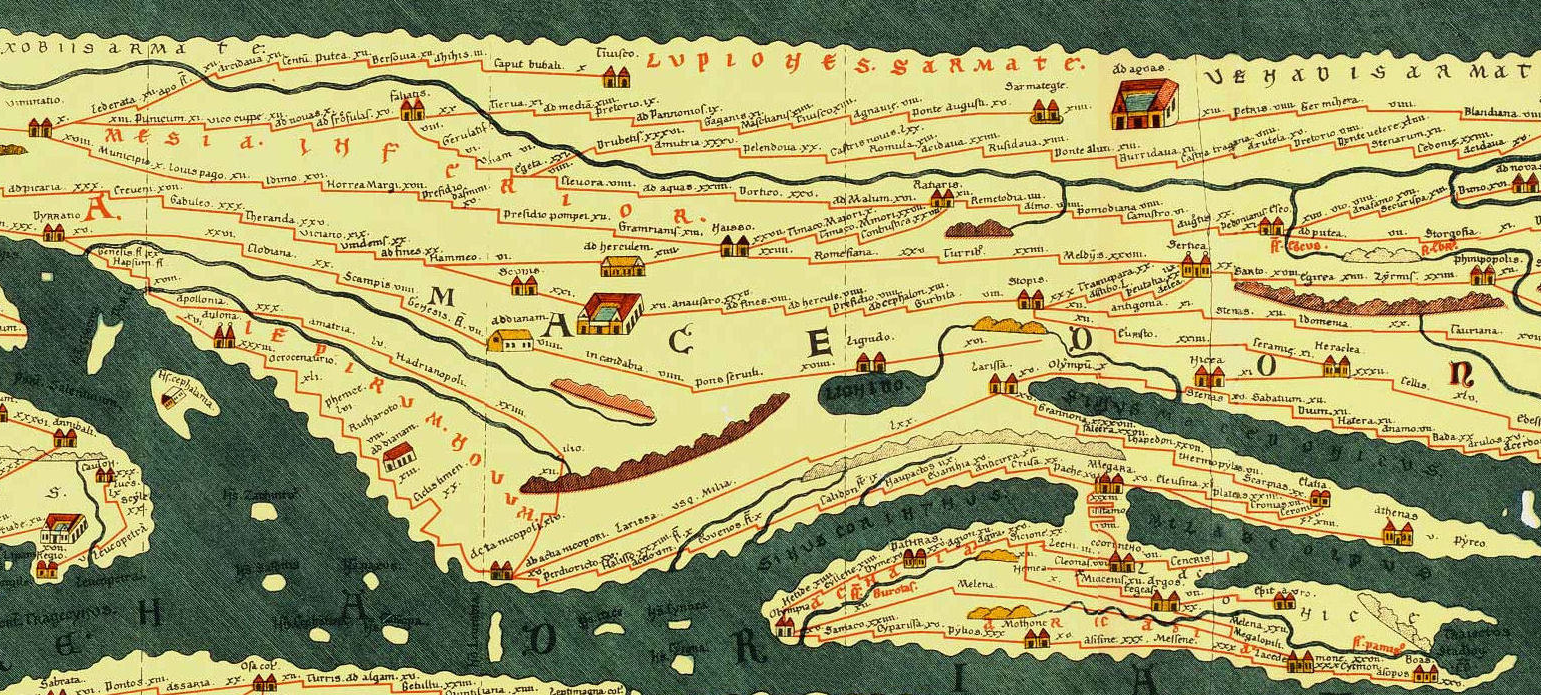
Amutria on Tabula Peutingeriana (upper center)

Amutria (Amutrion, Amutrium, Admutrium, Ad Mutrium, Ad Mutriam, Ancient Greek: Ἀμούτριον) was a Dacian town close to the Danube and included in the Roman road network, after the conquest of Dacia.

The name is homonymous with the ancient name of the nearby Motru River. Its possible position at this river's junction gives a certain importance.

== Ancient sources ==
=== Ptolemy's Geographia ===
Amutria is mentioned in Ptolemy's Geographia (c. 150 AD) in the form Amutrion (Ancient Greek: Ἀμούτριον) as an important Dacian town, at latitude 50° 00' N and longitude 44° 45' E (note that he used a different meridian and some of his calculations were off). It is located on a road between Drubetis and Potulatensioi.

=== Tabula Peutingeriana ===
Amutria is also depicted in the Tabula Peutingeriana (2nd century AD) between Drubetis and Pelendava, on one of the three roads build by Emperor Trajan in Dacia. The road was connecting into Via Trajana and most likely crossing Trajan's Bridge over the Danube. The location corresponds to the one mentioned by Ptolemy.

== Etymology ==
Romanian archaeologist and historian Grigore Tocilescu, assumes that Amutria should be read Ad-mutriam, Ad Mutriam or Ad Mutrium, meaning by/at the Mutrium (Motru). The modern Romanian linguist Sorin Olteanu is also suggesting the form Ad Mutrius, with Mutrius possibly being the ancient name of Motru River.

== Location ==
Amutria is hypothetically located at one of the following sites in Oltenia (Southwestern Romania):

- Valea Perilor, commune Cătunele, Gorj County
- Motru, Gorj County
- Gura Motrului, commune Butoiești, Mehedinți County
- Botoșești-Paia, Dolj County

=== Valea Perilor/Cătunele ===
Based on the archaeological survey and excavations performed at Cătunele in 1885, 1973, and later in 1981-84, a Roman castrum and civilian settlement was discovered.

The castrum lies in the Valea Perilor village, on an alluvial terrace of the Motru river, approximately 130 meters from the highway that connects the modern towns of Motru and Baia de Aramă. It is bordered in the east by the Chivădarul River and was intended to oversee the Valea Motrului mountainous region inhabited by a large Dacian population.

The archaeological site is cataloged as Chivadarul (LMI code GJ-I-s-B-09155) by the Romanian National Institute of Historical Monuments in the List of historical monuments in Romania.

The shape of the castrum is rectangular with rounded corners, with the dimensions 156 x 114 m^{2}. The castum is aligned lengthwise with the north-south axis, with the Porta Praetoria on the southern side.

The first systematic research was made in 1973 by the Iron Gates Region Museum from Drobeta-Turnu Severin and the Institute of Archaeology, Bucharest and then continued during 1981-1984, done by Gorj County Museum in collaboration with the Institute of Archaeology in Bucharest.

On the territory of the castrum were discovered many sherds of Roman and Dacian origin, indicating that the Dacians had coexisted with Roman soldiers and settlers. Some of the Dacian pottery was handmade, while others were worked on the wheel. These two populations - Dacians and Romans formed the ethnogenesis of the Romanian people and the archaeological evidence sustains this fact.

An important discovery regarding the chronology of this castrum is a Roman coin issued by Emperor Gallienus (c. 218 AD – 268 AD), that represented his wife, Salonina. This is a great indication that the castrum was still under Roman control in Gallienus' time and that it was probably abandoned only during the retreat from Dacia during Aurelian (271 – 275 AD).

It was also the discovery site of a signum militare in the form of a hand made of bronze, wearing a representation of goddess Victoria on the fingertips. The object is kept at the Iron Gates Region Museum.

The earlier excavations from 1885 led to other discoveries, including coins of Alexander Severus, arrows and rings with inscriptions.

To the north and east of the castrum, were the canabae (Roman civil settlements), stretching over an area of about 20 ha.

A Roman road (Via Romana) was also identified. The road was connecting this site to Castrum Pinoasa, passing through the modern villages of Glogova and Apa Neagră then heading towards Tismana River.

=== Botoșești-Paia ===
Locating Amutria at Botoșești, a site with a very rich evidence of a Roman presence, has a problem: it is not by the Motru river and does not fit the Ad Mutrium toponym connection.

However, there are two significant archeological sites cataloged by the Romanian National Institute of Historical Monuments: Cetatea Micului (LMI code DJ-I-s-B-07875), a Dacian fortress from late La Tène Period (1st century AD) and Piscul cazacilor (LMI code DJ-I-s-B-07876) site which includes a Dacian fortress (La Tène Period) and a Daco-Roman settlement (2nd - 4th century).

Piscul Cazacilor is one huge area (over two kilometres long) with lots with Roman artefacts, including pottery, bricks, and dressed stones. The site is placed in the northern third of the Piscul Cazacilor hill, and also on the left bank of the Paia River, to the north of the main site. Being perhaps a station, it includes the ancient Roman road connecting Drobeta with Pelendava, situated near the modern road coming from Botosesti Paia in the north.

Among the archaeological findings at the Paia river, there is evidence of the Mithraic cult practiced also in Dacia. A votive plaque has been recovered, with an inscription from which it can only be read gentilicium Valerius, probably a servus villicus (slave).

Another discovery is a good quality 9 cm bronze statuette depicting Mercury, the god of trade, with hair in locks, small wings in the hair and a crown (not petasus) on the head. He stands with his weight on the right leg, while the head tilts slightly to the right. The right arm hangs along the body. A corner of the mantle can be seen on the left shoulder, hanging along the arm and folding on the forearm. The statuette is in the inventory of Iron Gates Region Museum.

=== Gura Motrului/Butoiești ===
Romanian journalist and historian Petru Broșteanu, as well as other authors, placed Amutria at Gura Motrului, which in Romanian literally means the mouth of River Motru, based on measurements made out of Tabula Peutingeriana, and other sources. The location also fits well with the Ad Mutrium interpretation of the name.

Archaeological investigations at Butoiești in 1884 revealed traces of Roman civilization.

== See also ==
- Ad Mutriam (castra)
- Dacia
- Dacian davae
- List of ancient cities in Thrace and Dacia
- Roman Dacia
