= Lais =

Lais, Laïs or Laís is a given name and a surname. Notable people with the name include:

== Women ==
- Lais of Corinth (fl. 425 BC), a courtesan
- Lais of Hyccara (fl. 385 BC), a courtesan
- Laïs (physician) (fl. 1st/2nd century BC), an ancient Greek midwife and physician
- Laís Bodanzky, Brazilian film director, producer and screenwriter
- Laís Nunes, Brazilian freestyle wrestler
- Lais Oliveira, Brazilian model
- Lais Ribeiro, Brazilian model
- Laís Souza, Brazilian artistic gymnast and aerial skier

== Men ==
- Alberto Lais (1882–1951), Italian admiral
- Charles Lais, the namesake of the historic Charles Lais House, Sacramento, California, United States
- François Laïs or François Lays (1758–1831) French baritone and tenor opera singer
- Laís Araújo, Brazilian professional footballer
- Lais Estevam, Brazilian professional footballer
- Laís (footballer), Brazilian footballer
- Lais Najjar (born 2002), Syrian-American artistic gymnast
- Marc Lais, German former professional footballer
- Sergio Lais-Suárez, Argentine surgeon

== See also ==
- Abul Lais Siddiqui
- Abul Lais Islahi Nadvi
