= Motru (disambiguation) =

Motru is a city in Gorj County, Romania.

Motru may also refer to:

== Geography ==
- Motru (river), a tributary of the Jiu in the Southwest of Romania
- Gura Motrului, village in commune Butoiești, Mehedinți County, Romania

== History ==
- Amutria, ancient Dacian town, possibly modern Motru or Gura Motrului
- Amutria River, ancient Dacian name of the Motru River

== Other uses ==
- Constantin Rădulescu-Motru, a Romanian philosopher, psychologist, sociologist, logician, academic, dramatist, as well as centre-left nationalist politician
