= Paio (disambiguation) =

Paio is a variety of Iberian embutido sausage. Paio may also refer to:

- São Paio (disambiguation), various places in Portugal
- Paio Peres Correia (born c. 1205), a medieval Portuguese Christian conqueror of the Reconquista
- Paio Pires de Guimarães (born 1100), a medieval Knight and Rico-homem of the County of Portugal

== See also ==
- Paia (disambiguation)
