= Soeiro =

Soeiro is a Portuguese given name and surname.

Notable people with the given name include:

- Soeiro Raimundes de Riba de Vizela (d. 1220), Portuguese nobleman
- Soeiro Viegas (d. 1233), bishop of Lisbon from 1211
- Soeiro Pereira Gomes (1909–1949), Portuguese writer

Notable people with the surname include:

- Edite Soeiro (1934–2009), Portuguese journalist
- Ernesto Soeiro (born 1961), Portuguese footballer
- José Soeiro (born 1984), Portuguese sociologist and politician
- Manuel Soeiro (1909–1977), Portuguese footballer

== See also ==
- Suero (given name)
