= Pluta =

Pluta may refer to:

- Pluta, a village in Butoiești, Mehedinți County, Romania
- Pluta (surname)
