= Soruco =

Soruco is a surname. Notable people with the surname include:

- Ámbar Soruco (born 1996), Chilean footballer
- Modesto Soruco (born 1966), Bolivian footballer
- José Ramiro Suárez Soruco (born 1939), Bolivian businessman
- Nilo Soruco (1927–2004), Bolivian singer-songwriter
