= Cohors I Antiochensium equitata =

Cohors I Antiochensium quingenaria equitata
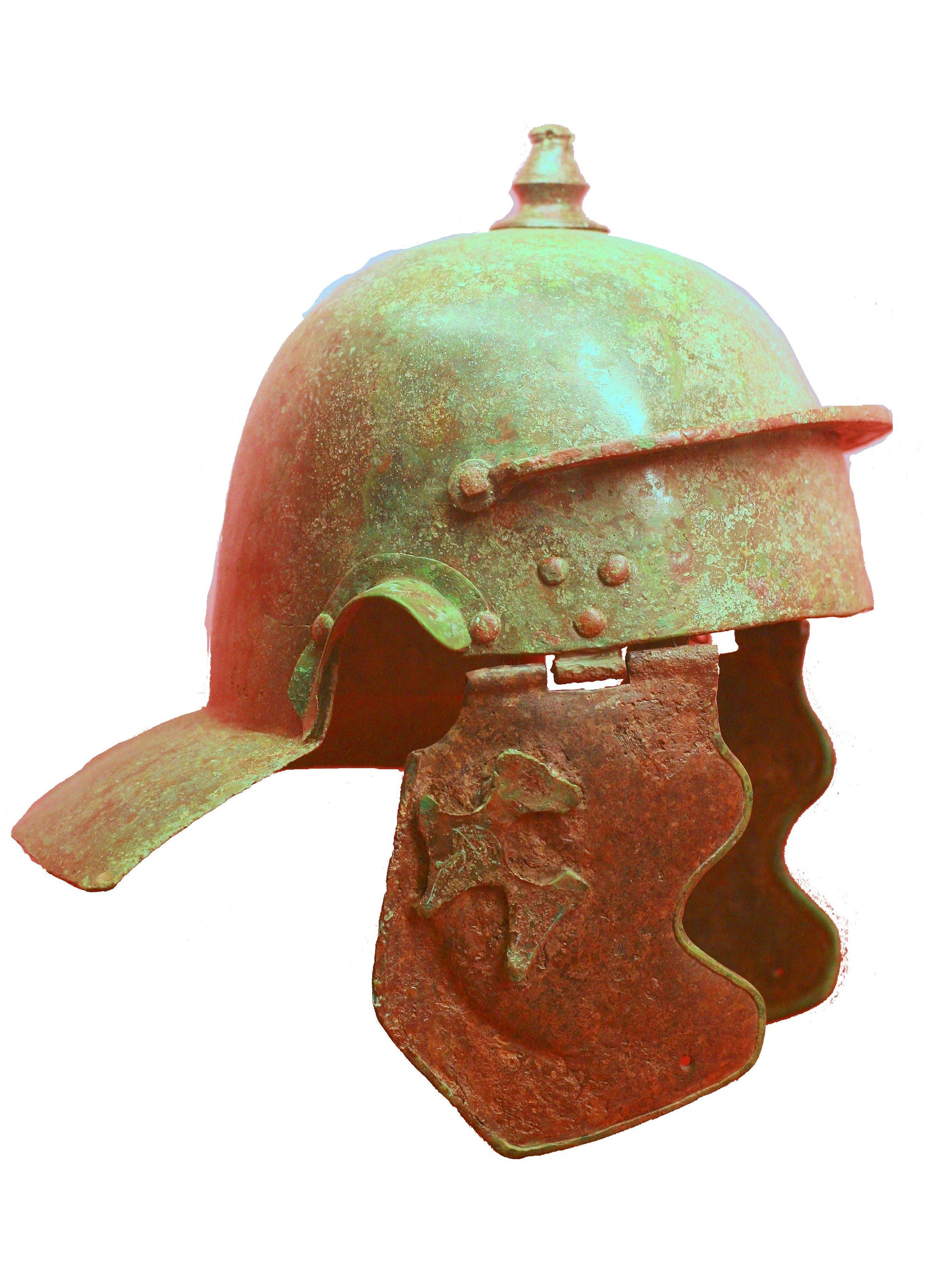
- Roman infantry helmet (late 1st century)
- Active: ?
- Country: Roman Empire
- Type: Roman auxiliary cohort
- Role: infantry/cavalry
- Size: 500 men (380 infantry, 120 cavalry)

Cohors [prima] Antiochensium [quingenaria] equitata ("[1st] part-mounted [500 strong] cohort of Antiochenses") was a Roman auxiliary regiment containing cavalry contingents. The cohort stationed in Dacia at castra Drobeta.

== See also ==
- Roman auxiliaries
- List of Roman auxiliary regiments
