= Mem Soares de Melo, 1st Lord de Melo =

Portuguese military personnel (1200–1262)

Mem Soares de Melo
- 1° Lord of Melo
- Born: 13th century Kingdom of Portugal
- Died: 13th century Kingdom of Portugal
- Noble family: Mello
- Spouse: Teresa Afonso Gato
- Father: Soeiro Raimundes
- Mother: Urraca Viegas

Mem Soares de Melo, 1st Lord de Melo (c. 1200 – 1262) was a Portuguese nobleman who served in the court of Afonso III of Portugal.

== Biography ==
Born approximately 1200, in Portugal, the son of Soeiro Raimundes de Riba de Vizela and Urraca Viegas Barroso, belonging to noble Lusitanian families. According to a prestigious Portuguese genealogist, Mem Soares de Melo was a descendant of two Visigoth kings.

He was married to Teresa Afonso Gato, daughter of Affonso Pires o Gato and Urraca Fernandes de Lumiares, a distant descendant of Mendo Alão, and his wife an Armenian princess.

Mem Soares de Melo was the owner of two Castles located in Gouveia. In 1249 he participated in the conquest of Faro by Afonso III. He held various honorary positions in his court, including as alferes-mor, counselor and lieutenant of Gouveia.

== See also ==
- List of lords of Melo
