= Paia =

Paia may refer to:

- PAiA Electronics, an American synthesizer kit company established in 1967
- Paia, Hawaii, a census-designated place in Maui County, Hawaii
- Paia, Achaea, a municipal unit in Achaea, Greece
- Paia, a type of embutido, an Iberian variety of cured, dry sausage
- Promotion of Access to Information Act, 2000, a South African law
- Grete Paia (born 1995), an Estonian singer
- Ian Paia (born 1990), a Solomon Islands footballer
- Paia (Samoa), a village in the Gagaʻifomauga district of Samoa

== See also ==
- Botoșești-Paia, a commune in Dolj County, Romania
- Paio (disambiguation)
