= Suero (given name) =

Suero is a Spanish masculine given name.

Suero is probably derived from the Latin suarius, "the late Roman term for state officials who procured and herded pigs for the annona of the city of Rome". Although unattested in antiquity, it may be compared to the known Latin cognomina based on "tenders of animals" (so-called Hirtennamen), such as Armentarius, Asinarius, Bublarius, Caprarius, Gallinaria, Jugarius, Pecuarius, Porcarius and Zebrarius. Although swineherds were not held in high regard, the name may be a nomen humilitatis (humble name), which Christians were known sometimes to deliberately choose (cf. Stodilo).

The earliest attested form is Suerio in a document of 760. Other medieval spellings are Suarius, Soarius, Sveire, Suero and Suer. The patronymic was spelled Suariz, Soariz, Sueriz or Suarez (modern Suárez).

Persons bearing the name Suero include:

- Suero Gundemáriz (fl. 968–991), Galician nobleman and rebel
- Suero Vermúdez (d. 1138), Asturian nobleman and territorial governor
- Suero I (bishop of Coria) (d. 1168)
- Suero Rodríguez (d. 1206), grand master of the Order of Santiago
- Suero de Quiñones (d. 1456), Leonese knight and author

== See also ==
- Soeiro, the Portuguese version
- Suidae, Latin cognate word for the pig family
