= Ad Mutriam (castra) =

Ancient Roman fortification

- Castra of Valea Perilor Castra of Cătunele; Amutria, Amutrion, Amutrium, Ad-mutria , Admutrium, Ad Mutrium
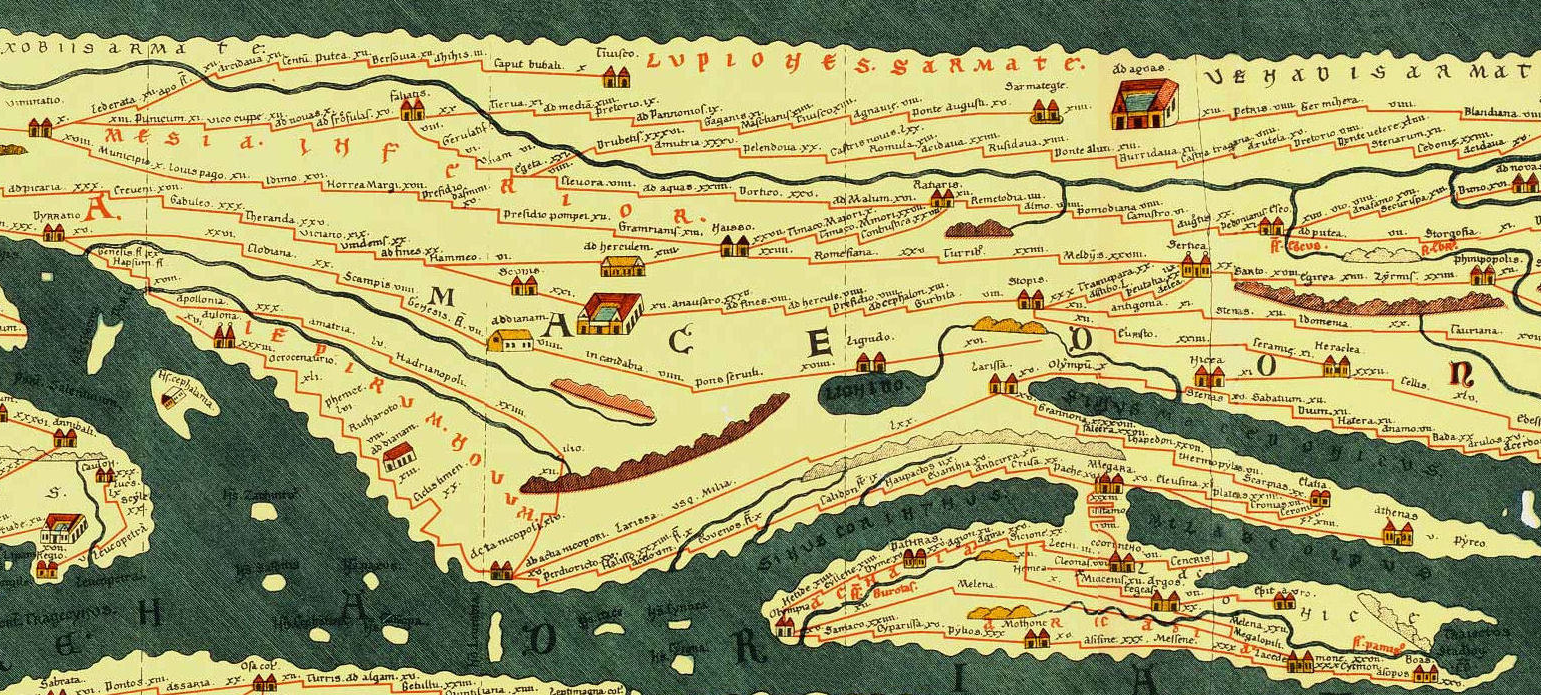
- Amutria on Tabula Peutingeriana (upper center)

- Location within Romania
- 44°50′N 22°55′E
- Location: Chivadarul / Cetate, Valea Perilor (Cătunele), Gorj, Romania

Site notes
- Condition: Ruined

Ad Mutriam was a fort in the Roman province of Dacia in the 2nd century AD.

== Etymology ==
Romanian archaeologist and historian Grigore Tocilescu assumes that Amutria should be read Ad-mutriam, Ad Mutriam or Ad Mutrium, meaning by/at the Mutrium (Motru). The modern Romanian linguist Sorin Olteanu is also suggesting the form Ad Mutrius, with Mutrius possibly being the ancient name of Motru River.

== See also ==
- Amutria
- List of castra
