= Palermo, Huila =

Palermo Guagua
- Municipality and town
- Flag Coat of arms
- Nickname: Capital Marmolera de Colombia; Marble Capital of Colombia
- Motto: "Por el camino del progreso"
- Anthem: Himno a Palermo
- Location of the municipality and town of Palermo, Huila in the Huila Department of Colombia.
- Coordinates: 2°53′30″N 75°26′15″W
- Country: Colombia
- Department: Huila Department
- Subregion: Subnorte
- Incorporated (parish): 1690
- Incorporated (municipality): 7 January 1774
- Renamed: 1906

Government
  - Mayor: Helver Yesid Pinzón Saavedra (C)

Area
  - Municipality and town: 92.29 km^{2} (35.63 sq mi)
  - Land: 1.44 km^{2} (0.56 sq mi)
  - Urban: 13.89 km^{2} (5.36 sq mi)

Population (2020 est.)
  - Municipality and town: 35,569
  - Density: 24,700/km^{2} (64,000/sq mi)
- Time zone: UTC-5 (Colombia Standard Time)
- Area code: 878
- Website: http://www.palermo-huila.gov.co

Palermo is a town and municipality in the Huila Department, Colombia. This town was previously named Guagua.

== Culture ==
=== Notable people from Palermo ===
- Manuel de Jesús Andrade Suárez (1860–1935) writer, journalist and politician.

=== Twin Cities ===
- Palermo, Italy

== Climate ==
Climate data for Palermo (Juncal El), elevation 460 m (1,510 ft), (1981–2010)
Month	Jan	Feb	Mar	Apr	May	Jun	Jul	Aug	Sep	Oct	Nov	Dec	Year
Mean daily maximum °C (°F)	31.8 (89.2)	32.0 (89.6)	31.7 (89.1)	31.4 (88.5)	31.5 (88.7)	32.2 (90.0)	32.4 (90.3)	33.3 (91.9)	33.6 (92.5)	32.4 (90.3)	31.0 (87.8)	31.3 (88.3)	32.1 (89.8)
Daily mean °C (°F)	26.9 (80.4)	26.9 (80.4)	26.7 (80.1)	26.6 (79.9)	26.6 (79.9)	26.8 (80.2)	26.9 (80.4)	27.6 (81.7)	27.7 (81.9)	26.9 (80.4)	26.4 (79.5)	26.4 (79.5)	26.9 (80.4)
Mean daily minimum °C (°F)	21.4 (70.5)	21.9 (71.4)	21.9 (71.4)	21.8 (71.2)	21.8 (71.2)	21.7 (71.1)	21.5 (70.7)	21.8 (71.2)	21.8 (71.2)	21.6 (70.9)	21.7 (71.1)	21.5 (70.7)	21.7 (71.1)
Average precipitation mm (inches)	129.4 (5.09)	122.3 (4.81)	180.6 (7.11)	148.9 (5.86)	107.2 (4.22)	33.0 (1.30)	31.9 (1.26)	17.6 (0.69)	59.2 (2.33)	196.1 (7.72)	227.5 (8.96)	177.6 (6.99)	1,400.8 (55.15)
Average precipitation days	11	12	16	15	14	10	9	7	9	16	17	14	144
Average relative humidity (%)	75	73	76	76	75	69	66	62	64	70	76	77	72
Mean monthly sunshine hours	198.4	158.1	142.6	141.0	161.2	165.0	170.5	170.5	153.0	161.2	165.0	189.1	1,975.6
Mean daily sunshine hours	6.4	5.6	4.6	4.7	5.2	5.5	5.5	5.5	5.1	5.2	5.5	6.1	5.4
Source: Instituto de Hidrologia Meteorologia y Estudios Ambientales
