= Raimundo Pais de Riba de Vizela =

Portuguese politician

- Rico-homem
- Born: 12th century Portugal
- Died: 13th century Portugal

Raimundo Pais de Riba de Vizela was a Portuguese nobleman, who served as tenente of Covilhã, Gouveia and Besteiros.

He was born in the Iberian Peninsula, son of Paio Pires de Guimarães and Elvira Fernandes, belonging to a noble Portuguese Galician family. He was married to Dórdia Afonso de Riba Douro, daughter of Afonso Viegas and Aldara Pires, a noble woman, daughter of Pedro Fróilaz de Traba.
