= Patrick d'Aulan =

French winemaker and businessman

Patrick de Suarez d’Aulan
- Citizenship: French
- Occupations: winemaker and businessman

Patrick de Suarez d'Aulan is a French aristocrat, winemaker, and businessman.

== Career ==
In 1999, Patrick de Suarez d'Aulan co-founded the Alta Vista winery in Argentina. In 2001, he was among the first producers in Argentina to make single-vineyard Malbec grape wines from specific old vines' terroirs of Mendoza.

In 1999, his family founded the Chateau Dereszla winery in Tokay, Hungary.

In 1999, d'Aulan also acquired the Château Sansonnet estate in Saint-Émilion, France, whose classification of Saint-Émilion wine had dropped from Grand Cru Classé to Grand Cru in 1996. In 2008, wine critic Robert Parker praised d'Aulan's "talented" development of Château Sansonnet in the seventh edition of his Wine Buyer's Guide.

In 2010, Patrick d'Aulan was appointed as the chairman of Cordier Mestrezat Grands Crus, a wine trading company based in Bordeaux, France. He acquired the company in 2012, and under his leadership, the company expanded its portfolio to include several high-end Bordeaux wines.

In recognition of his contributions to the wine industry, d'Aulan has received several awards and honors over the years. In 2016, he was awarded the Chevalier de la Légion d'Honneur, one of the highest civilian honors in France. The following year, he was inducted into the French Legion of Honor, which recognizes individuals who have made significant contributions to French culture and society.

== Personal life ==
Patrick de Suarez d'Aulan comes from a prominent aristocratic French family that has a long history in the wine industry. His father, François de Suarez d'Aulan, was a well-known winemaker who owned and ran the Champagne house Piper-Heidsieck and also played a key role in developing the Tokaji wine region in Hungary.

Patrick de Suarez d'Aulan himself has become a well-respected figure in the wine industry and has been featured in various publications such as Wine Spectator and Wine Enthusiast. He is known for his dedication to terroir-driven winemaking and has been instrumental in promoting the wines of Argentina and Hungary on the global stage.

In addition to his work in the wine industry, de Suarez d'Aulan is also involved in various philanthropic initiatives. He is the founder of the Association du Village de Cluny, a non-profit organization that works to promote sustainable development in the village of Cluny in France.
