= Văgiulești =

- Commune
- Location in Romania
- Coordinates: 44°43′N 23°05′E
- Country: Romania
- County: Gorj
- Subdivisions: Cârciu, Covrigi, Murgilești, Valea Motrului, Văgiulești

Government
  - Mayor (2020–2024): Constantin Pârjol (PSD)
- Area: 48.01 km^{2} (18.54 sq mi)
- Elevation: 176 m (577 ft)
- Population (2021-12-01): 2,188
  - Density: 46/km^{2} (120/sq mi)
- Time zone: EET/EEST (UTC+2/+3)
- Postal code: 217545
- Area code: +(40) x53
- Vehicle reg.: GJ
- Website: primariavagiulesti.ro

Văgiulești is a commune in Gorj County, Oltenia, Romania. It is composed of five villages: Cârciu, Covrigi, Murgilești, Valea Motrului, and Văgiulești.

The commune is situated in the western reaches of the Getic Plateau, at an altitude of 176 m (577 ft), on the left bank of the river Motru. It is located in the southwestern part of Gorj County, 16 km (9.9 mi) southeast of Motru municipality and 57 km (35 mi) southwest of the county seat, Târgu Jiu, on the border with Mehedinți County.
