= Juan Fernando Hermosa =

Ecuadorian serial killer

- Hermosa around the time of his arrest (early 1990s)
- Born: Juan Fernando Hermosa Suárezi; February 28, 1976; Clemente Baquerizo, Los Ríos Province, Ecuador
- Died: February 28, 1996 (aged 20); Nueva Loja, Sucumbíos Province, Ecuador
- Cause of death: Murdered by unknown assailants
- Other name: "Niño del Terror- Child of Terror"
- Conviction: Murder
- Penalty: 4 years imprisonment

Details
- Victims: 23
- Span of crimes: 1991–1992
- Country: Ecuador
- State: Pichincha
- Date apprehended: January 9, 1992

Juan Fernando Hermosa Suárez (February 28, 1976 – February 28, 1996), known as Niño del Terror (Child of Terror), was the youngest serial killer in the history of Ecuador.

== Early life ==
Hermosa was born on February 28, 1976, in Clemente Baquerizo, Los Ríos Province. He was adopted by Olivo Hermosa Fonseca and Zoila Amada Suárez Mejía, who took him to live in a populous neighborhood north of Quito. Hermosa was often looked after by his deaf adoptive mother, who also suffered from arthritis, while his adoptive father travelled around the Sucumbíos Province, where he owned properties.

== Crimes ==
At 15 years of age, Hermosa began leading a gang of ten youths of the same age, frequenting videogame shops in the La Marín sector of downtown Quito. He also often went to bars and clubs in the Puente del Guambra area, near the Central University.

=== Murders ===
After leaving a discothèque with friends on November 22, 1991, the group took a taxi from the San Remo area, and upon reaching 10 de Agosto Avenue, Hermosa drew a 9 mm pistol obtained from a guard and shot the driver in the head, killing him instantly. One of his friends then drove the vehicle southeast of the city and disposed of the body in a guardaya (a small natural or man-made channel designed for water runoff—‌a gully or ravine) in the Los Chillos Valley, where the body was found by police the next day. A week later, Hermosa went with other members of his gang to a hairdresser operated by a transgender man named Charlie, south of the city. Charlie invited them to drink at his home, where an argument ensued which ended in Hermosa shooting Charlie five times before the latter could call for help.

Hermosa's crimes totaled 22 murders, occurring in only four months, claiming the lives of 8 taxi drivers, 11 homosexuals, a truck driver who was also an acquaintance of his, as well as two others, earning him the nickname "Niño del Terror". The victims were all shot with a 9 mm pistol. The crimes occurred on weekends, which caused a panic among the taxi drivers and homosexuals who lived in northern Quito.

=== Capture ===
Mayor Fausto Terán Bustillos was put in command of a squad formed by the Grupo de Intervención y Rescate (GIR) of the National Police, which was in charge of investigating Niño del Terror's crimes. Police managed to catch a group of young criminals during an attempted robbery in the city center, who identified Hermosa as the suspected killer. On January 9, 1992, they located the Hermosa residence between América and Diguja Streets. On January 16 at 3 a.m., the police entered the home through a skylight that they determined was facing the suspect's room, but Hermosa was sleeping in his mother's room. Hermosa began shooting at close range with his 9 mm pistol, starting a shootout between him and the police. A group of gendarmes who were on the street began throwing grenades, causing an explosion that ended up knocking down the wall of the house on top of two policemen. Hermosa's mother died during the confrontation, shot 11 times, while Hermosa himself was captured 15 minutes later without injury while trying to escape through the back window.

A contingent of ten agents transferred Hermosa to García Moreno prison that same morning, where they were surprised to learn that the suspect was a minor, declared by his own words: "I want to make it clear that my name is Juan Fernando Hermosa Suárez and that on February 28, I will be 16 years old". He claimed in his statements that he had no intent of killing, as he had asked his victims to be quiet and that nothing would happen to them, but by ignoring that warning, they ended their lives. Hermosa said that on one occasion he was threatened with a .22 caliber revolver, and on another occasion a taxi driver had tried to attack him with a wheel wrench, so he had to kill them with his gun.

==== Condemnation, escape and recapture ====
After confessing to his crimes, Hermosa was sentenced to four years imprisonment, the maximum penalty the law allowed for a minor, to be served at Virgilio Guerrero Rehabilitation Center. However, he became a juvenile leader in prison in the first 16 months, even managing to obtain a pistol through his girlfriend Yadira, with which he killed a policeman attempting to stop him by shooting the policeman five times, before escaping from prison with ten young boys on June 17, 1993. Hermosa fled to Colombia, where he contracted tonsillitis, but was recaptured and released after serving his sentence in 1996.

== Death ==
After his release, Hermosa went to live with his father in Nueva Loja, Sucumbíos. On the day of his 20th birthday, he was found dead on the banks of the Aguarico River. It was revealed by police that five hooded individuals were responsible for the murder. Police had to identify Hermosa through documents in his wallet, as he showed signs of having been tortured—‌his face was disfigured, he appeared to have been cut with machetes, and he was riddled with bullets.

== Documentary ==
In 2011, the documentary Tras las sombras del niño del terror, directed, produced and written by Vladimir and Marco Soasti, premiered.

== See also ==
- List of serial killers by country
- List of serial killers by number of victims
- List of youngest killers
