= François de Suarez d'Aulan =

French aristocrat and businessman

François de Suarez d'Aulan is a French aristocrat and businessman. He was married to the late Countess and Marchioness Sonia Czernin von und zu Chudentitz (house of Czernin). He notably owned the family-run champagne house Piper-Heidsieck, and was known as "The king of Champagne". De Suarez d'Aulan's family history is chronicled in the book "Un fil dans le Tapis, histoire des Suarez d'Aulan," published by Editions Karthala in June 2009.
