= Paio Pires de Guimarães =

Portuguese politician

- Lord of Riba de Vizela
- Born: 12th-century Portugal
- Died: 12th-century Portugal
- Spouse: Elvira Fernandes.
- Father: Pero Fromarigues de Guimarães
- Mother: Sancha Afonso.
- Occupation: Knight

Paio Pires de Guimarães (1100–?) was a medieval Knight and Rico-homem (rich man) of the County of Portugal. He was Lord of Riba de Vizela.
