= São Paio =

São Paio may refer to the following places in Portugal:

- São Paio (Arcos de Valdevez), a parish in the municipality of Arcos de Valdevez
- São Paio (Gouveia), a parish in the municipality of Gouveia
- São Paio (Guimarães), a parish in the municipality of Guimarães
- São Paio (Melgaço), a parish in the municipality of Melgaço
- São Paio de Oleiros, a parish in the municipality of Santa Maria da Feira
