= Nicolás Suárez =

Nicolás Suárez may refer to:

- Nicolás Suárez Bremec (born 1977), Uruguayan football (soccer) player
- Nicolás Suárez Callaú (1851–1940), founder of multinational rubber empire
- Nicolás Suárez (Bolivian footballer) (born 1978), Bolivian football manager and former defender
- Nicolás Suárez Province, province in Pando Department, Bolivia
- Nicolás Suárez (Chilean footballer) (born 1982), Chilean football centre-back
- Nicolás Suárez (Uruguayan footballer) (born 1999), Uruguayan football forward
