= Glogova, Gorj =

Glogova
- Commune
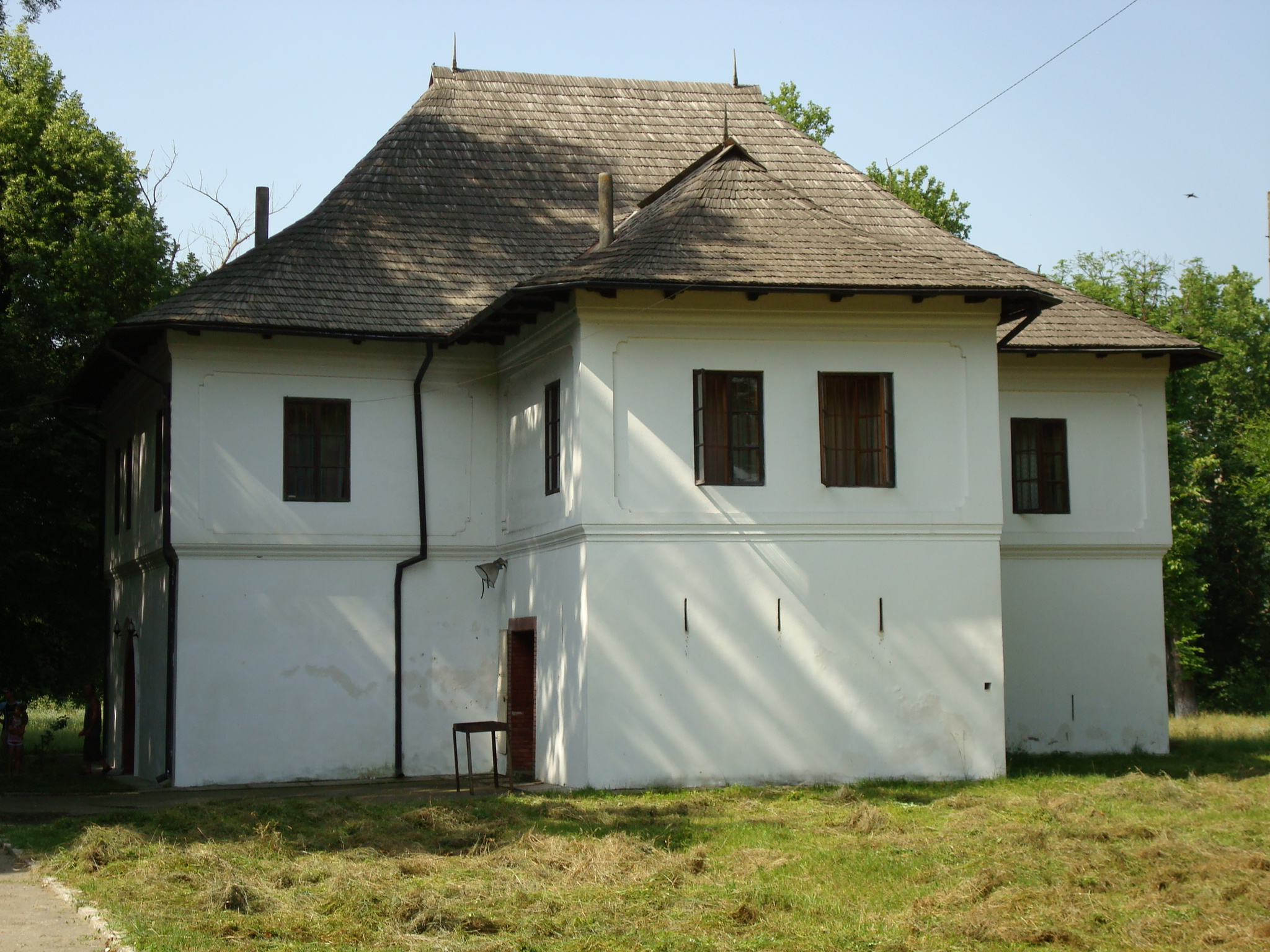
- Glogoveanu manor in Glogova

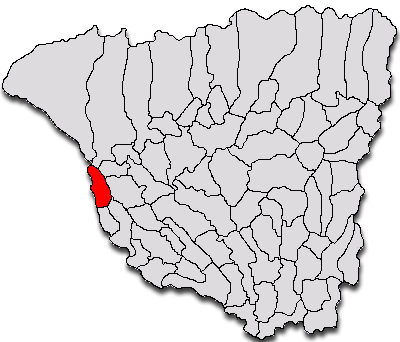
- Location in Gorj County

- Location in Romania
- Coordinates: 44°55′41″N 22°54′24″E
- Country: Romania
- County: Gorj
- Subdivisions: Cămuiești, Cleșnești, Glogova, Iormănești, Olteanu

Government
  - Mayor (2020–2024): Gheorghe Alpredi (PSD)
- Area: 51.32 km^{2} (19.81 sq mi)
- Elevation: 236 m (774 ft)
- Population (2021-12-01): 1,922
  - Density: 37.45/km^{2} (97.00/sq mi)
- Time zone: UTC+02:00 (EET)
  - Summer (DST): UTC+03:00 (EEST)
- Postal code: 217248
- Area code: +(40) 253
- Vehicle reg.: GJ
- Website: primariaglogova.ro

Glogova is a commune in Gorj County, Oltenia, Romania. It is composed of five villages: Cămuiești, Cleșnești, Glogova, Iormănești (the commune centre), and Olteanu.
