= Charles Lais House =

Historic house in California, United States

- U.S. National Register of Historic Places
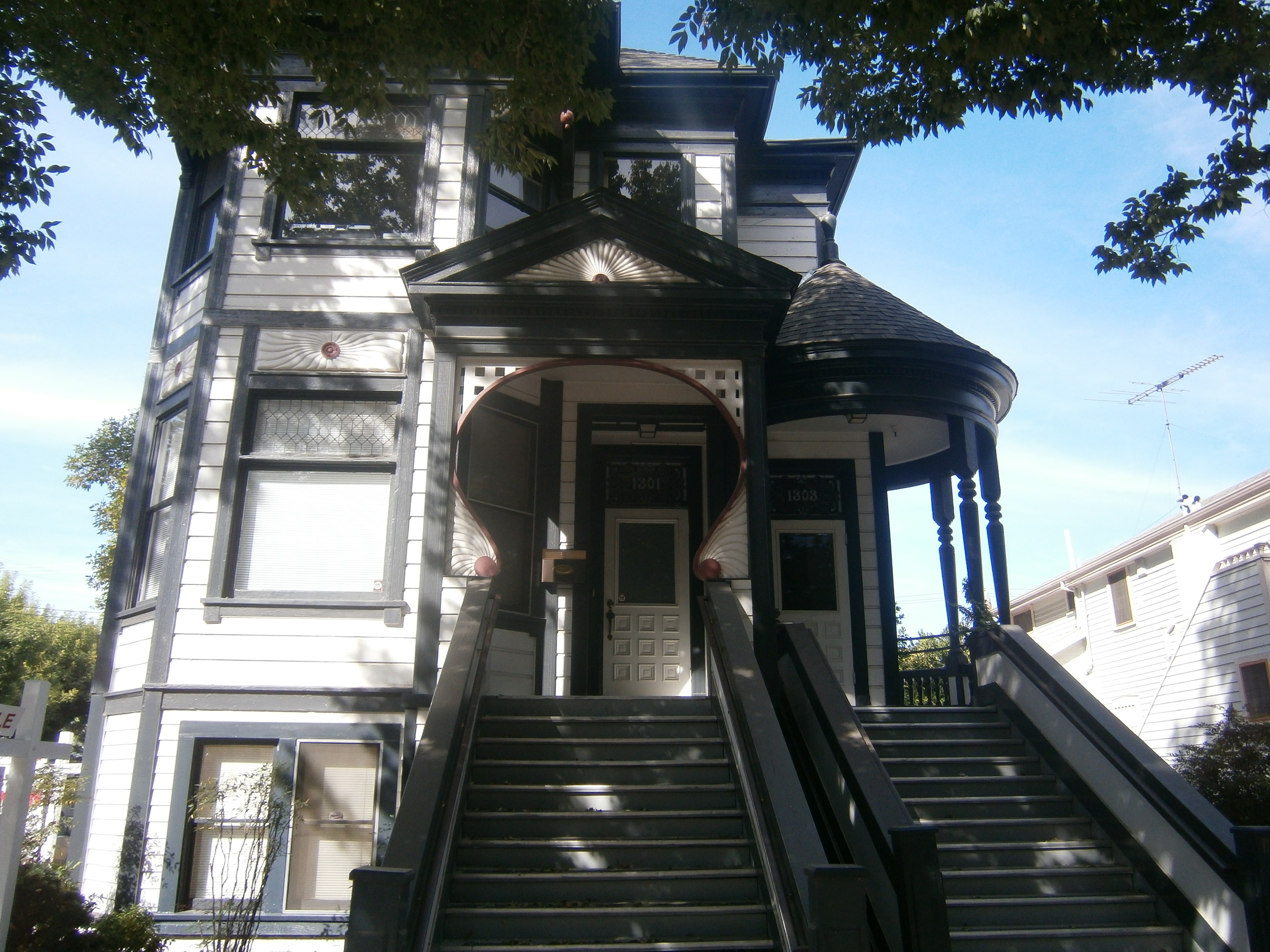

- Location within Sacramento, California Location within California Location within the United States
- Location: 1301 H St., Sacramento, California
- Coordinates: 38°34′53.7″N 121°29′16.7″W
- Area: .101 acres (0.041 ha)
- Built: 1896
- Architectural style: Queen Anne
- NRHP reference No.: 85000358
- Added to NRHP: February 28, 1985

The Charles Lais House is a historic home built in 1896, located in Sacramento, California. It is designed in the Queen Anne style. It was commissioned by Charles Lais, an employee of the Southern Pacific Railroad. The third floor was used as a rooming house and the family occupied the house until his death c. 1930. A fire in 1980 destroyed the back end of the house and 50 percent of the roof. It was restored in 1982.

== See also ==
- Sacramento, California
