= Soeiro Raimundes de Riba de Vizela =

Portuguese politician

- Rico-homem
- Born: 12th century Kingdom of Portugal
- Died: 13th century Kingdom of Portugal
- Spouse: Urraca Viegas Barroso
- Occupation: Military

Soeiro Raimundes de Riba de Vizela (mid-12th century - 1220) was a Portuguese nobleman, who served as alferes-mor of Afonso II of Portugal.

He was born in Portugal, the son of Raimundo Pais de Riba de Vizela and Dordia Afonso de Riba Douro, granddaughter of Egas Moniz, o Aio.

Soeiro Raimundez of Riba de Vizela was the husband of Urraca Viegas Barroso, daughter Egas Gomes Barroso and Urraca Vasques de Ambia.
