= Pluta (surname) =

Pluta, Pliuta or Plyuta (Ukrainian: Плюта) is a surname. Notable people include:

- Andrzej Pluta (born 1974), Polish basketball player and coach
- Grzegorz Pluta (born 1974), Polish wheelchair fencer
- Yevhen Plyuta (born 1974), Ukrainian figure skater
