= Pero Fromarigues de Guimarães =

Portuguese nobleman

- Lord
- Born: 11th-century Kingdom of León
- Died: 12th-century Portugal?
- Spouse: Gotinha

Pero Fromarigues de Guimarães (c.1080-?) was a Portuguese nobleman, Lord of Melo.

Pero was the son of Fromarigo Guterres, great-grandson of Sueiro Belfaguer, and a descendant of the knights of Kingdom of León.
