= Manuel de Jesús Andrade Suárez =

Colombian writer, journalist and politician

Dr. Manuel de Jesús Andrade Suarez
- Manuel de Jesús Andrade Suárez (center) with his family.
- Born: 17 March 1860; Guagua today Palermo, Huila, Granadine Confederation today Colombia
- Died: 1935 (aged 74–75); Bogotá, Colombia
- Occupations: Writer, Journalist and politician.

Dr. Manuel de Jesús Andrade Suárez (17 March 1860 – 1935) was a Colombian writer, journalist and politician.
A biography has been composed by Rodolfo Pérez Pimentel.

== List of works ==
- Ecuador. Próceres de la independencia; indice alfabetico de sus nombres con algunos bocetos biográficos. 1909
- Páginas de sangre; ó, Los asesinatos de Quito, el 28 de enero de 1912. 1912
- Apostillas geográficas universales: la tierra en 1915, antes de los efectos finales de la Guerra Europea 1915
- Provincia de El Oro; monografías cantonales Machala. Pasaje. Santa Rosa. 1923
- Provincia de El Oro; monografías cantonales Zaruma. 1923
- Más próceres de la independencia, otros complementos y rectificaciones. 1934
- Andanzas de un colombiano. 1935
- Diccionario ortológico, analógico, sintáctico y ortográfico; o, Catálogo de voces castellanas cuyo uso puede ofrecer dificultad, 1935
