= Ernesto Soeiro =

Portuguese footballer

Personal information
- Full name: Ernesto Almeida Soeiro
- Date of birth: 24 February 1961 (age 65)
- Place of birth: Viseu, Portugal
- Position: Midfielder

Youth career
- 1975–1976: Oeiras
- 1976–1979: Estoril Praia

Senior career*
Years	Team	Apps	(Gls)
1979–1984	Estoril Praia	83	(1)
1984–1986	Marítimo	47	(2)
1986	Toronto First Portuguese		

International career
- Portugal U21
- * Club domestic league appearances and goals

Ernesto Almeida Soeiro (born 24 February 1961) is a Portuguese former professional footballer who played as a midfielder.

== Club career ==
Soeiro played at the youth level originally with Oeiras in 1975 then joined Estoril Praia the following season. In 1979, he joined the senior team and played in the Primeira Divisão. In total he appeared in eighty three matches and recorded one goal. In 1984, he played in the Segunda Divisão with Marítimo, and the following season he assisted in securing promotion to the Primeira Divisão. In 1986, he played abroad in the National Soccer League with Toronto First Portuguese.

== International career ==
Soeiro also represented the Portugal U21 national team and made three appearances.
