= Laïs (physician) =

Ancient Greek physician and midwife

Laïs and Lais (Ancient Greek: Λαῒς) (fl. 1st/2nd century BCE) was an ancient Greek physician and midwife known for her disagreements with Elephantis, and for Pliny's skepticism about the efficacy of her medicine. Pliny wrote about her disagreement with Elephantis about fertility, menstruation, abortifacients, and the use of several medicinal plants, including myrtle and cabbage root. Pliny also described her treatment for rabies and fevers, which involved a silver bracelet containing wool from a black ram.
