= Sergio Lais-Suárez =

Argentine surgeon

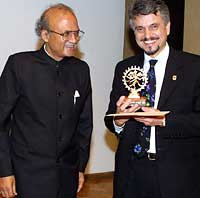
- El Dr. Lais-Suarez recibe un galardón de Oro del Gobierno de la India, entregado por la embajada de ese país en Argentina
- Born: Villa Mercedes, San Luis, Argentina
- Occupation: Surgeon Medical Doctor
- Website: Sitio Oficial-1 Sitio Oficial-2 Sitio Oficial-3

Sergio Lais-Suárez is an Argentine surgeon. In 2007, he was named Honorary Consul of India for Cordoba.
