= Botoșești-Paia =

- Commune
- Location in Romania
- Coordinates: 44°24′N 23°16′E
- Country: Romania
- County: Dolj

Government
  - Mayor (2024–2028): Alexandru Opran (PSD)
- Area: 29.34 km^{2} (11.33 sq mi)
- Elevation: 214 m (702 ft)
- Population (2021-12-01): 585
  - Density: 19.9/km^{2} (51.6/sq mi)
- Time zone: UTC+02:00 (EET)
  - Summer (DST): UTC+03:00 (EEST)
- Postal code: 207070
- Area code: +(40) 251
- Vehicle reg.: DJ

Botoșești-Paia is a commune in Dolj County, Oltenia, Romania with a population of 585 people as of the 2021 census. It is composed of a single village, Botoșești-Paia.
