= José Ramiro Suárez Soruco =

Bolivian businessman

- Born: March 16, 1939 (age 87); Cochabamba, Bolivia
- Occupation: Business executive
- Known for: Former president of Yacimientos Petrolíferos Fiscales Bolivianos (YPFB)

José Ramiro Suárez Soruco (born March 16, 1939) is a Bolivian business executive and academic researcher who was the executive president of Bolivian oil company Yacimientos Petrolíferos Fiscales Bolivianos (YPFB) during the government of Eduardo Rodríguez Veltzé.

He has held a range of leadership and research positions throughout the Southern Cone, working for YPFB, the Organization of American States, and a range of companies and national governments. Since 1988 he is a member of the Bolivian National Academy of Sciences.

A widely published researcher, Suarez is an expert on paleozoic biostratigraphy, invertebrate paleontology, national parks, wild life sanctuaries, and paleoecology. Among other distinctions in 1997 he received the Robert Dott Memorial Award from the American Association of Petroleum Geologists.

== Career ==
Between 1965 and 1968 Suarez was an assistant of biostratigraphy and paleontology in the University of Buenos Aires, Argentina. In 1969 he was a professor of zoology in the Universidad Mayor de San Andrés. In 1970, he was an educational investigator of OAS at the University of Santiago in Chile. Between 1976 and 1980 Suarez was a professor of geology in the Gabriel René Moreno Autonomous University, Santa Cruz de la Sierra Bolivia; between 1978 and 1979 professor of biology, and since 2000 occupied a professorship of geology in the environmental engineering area of the Universidad Católica Boliviana in Cochabamba, Bolivia.

He founded the Alcide d'Orbigny Natural History Museum in Cochabamba, and intensively collaborated the first years of its operation among some volunteers and friends of nature. Later on the museum has relied on the public university administration.

== Personal life ==
He has retired from geology, petroleum and business activities, but he still researches human evolution and astronomy. He lives in Cochabamba.
