= Drobeta (castra) =

- Drubeta
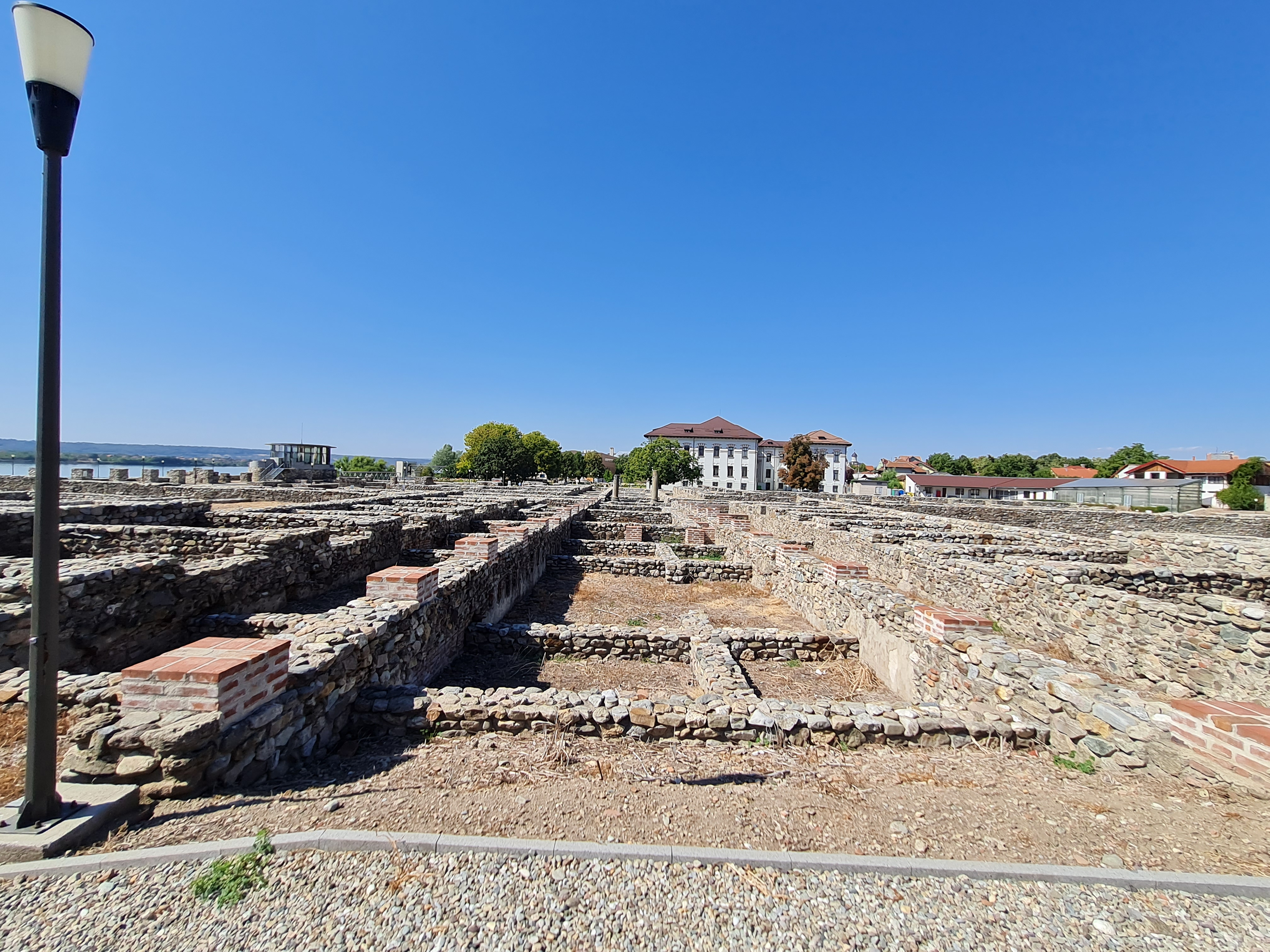
- Drobeta fort

- Location within Romania
- 44°37′30″N 22°40′05″E
- Location: Drobeta-Turnu Severin, Mehedinți, Romania

History
- Founded: 103
- Built: Trajan
- Abandoned: c. 6th century AD

Site notes
- Condition: Ruined

The Drobeta (castra) was a fort built by Emperor Trajan in the province of Roman Dacia, in the present city Drobeta-Turnu Severin. It was built to protect the northern side of Trajan's Bridge across the Danube which was built quickly in preparation for Trajan's Second Dacian War in 103-105 AD. It was therefore in a key strategic location from where the imperial road north into Dacia started.

Around it developed the Roman city of Drobeta.

The fort has been extensively excavated and is visible today.

It was the first stone fort built by Romans in Dacia and the only one that was used from the 2nd century until the beginning of the 7th century. The orientation of the fort is an exception to Roman military architecture as the Porta Praetoria gate is to the South, possibly because it defended the bridge.

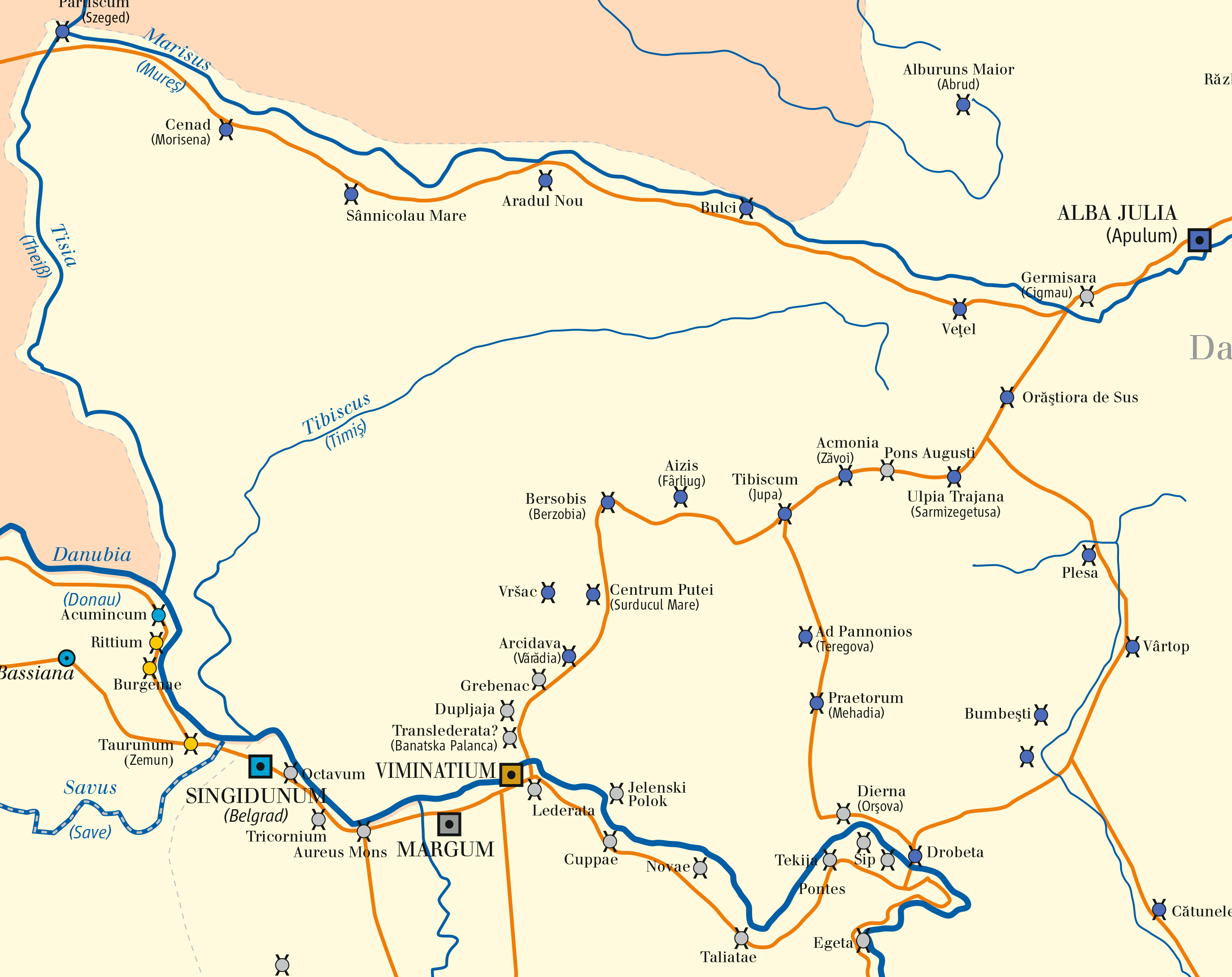
Western Dacia forts, roads and cities

== History ==
The Drobeta Roman fort had at least five consecutive phases of construction and consolidation. The first phase began in 101 AD. The fort had a rectangular shape and was surrounded by a wall built in opus caementicium with facing opus vittatum. All four gates were flanked by two inner towers. The curtain wall was doubled on the inside and a defensive trench was dug on the outside. As appears on Trajan's Column, there were wooden constructions inside the castle but some remains of masonry belong to this stage, perhaps only the principia.

In the second stage, of Hadrian's era, stone buildings included the praetorium (officers' residence), barracks, hospital (valetudinarium) and horrea. The praetorium and hospital had rooms arranged around a central space framed by porticoes.

The third phase is dated to Emperor Gallienus (r.260-8) after the destruction following the Carpic invasion in 245-247. Due to the change in military tactics and defense, three gates were closed: the decumana and two principales, and a large outer tower with a square plan was built in their place. The main praetoria gate was rebuilt flanked by two outer semicircular towers. The outer and corner towers were doubled with outer towers. The outer ditch was filled in and three other wider and much deeper ditches dug. The Principia were modified according to a basilica plan and everything was redesigned around a wide road while the barracks were reduced and modified.

In the fourth phase repairs were made and the enclosure wall was modified following the withdrawal from Dacia during the time of Constantine the Great (306-337). Stone barracks were built and the intermediate spaces were rearranged making room for household workshops such as pottery kilns. Probably the old space of the headquarters of the military command was used as a garrison by federates of the Sântana de Mureș-Cerneahov Culture from the 4th century.

The fort was destroyed in the first half of the 5th century probably by the Huns and the 5th phase from the end of the 5th century, possibly under Emperor Anastasius I, provided for the rebuilding of the enclosure wall. Barracks were built outside the fort arranged in four buildings and each barracks had a row of rooms with a portico on the front. Bread ovens, baths, pottery workshops and other facilities needed by the garrison were located in the blocks formed.

The last restoration of the castle dates to Justinian I (527-565) who partially restored the castle, when Drobeta had the last flourishing period and the fort was temporarily called "Theodora" (after his wife).

The fort was probably destroyed by the Avars at the beginning of the 7th century and a settlement was built over its ruins in the 10th century.

Phase 2 fort

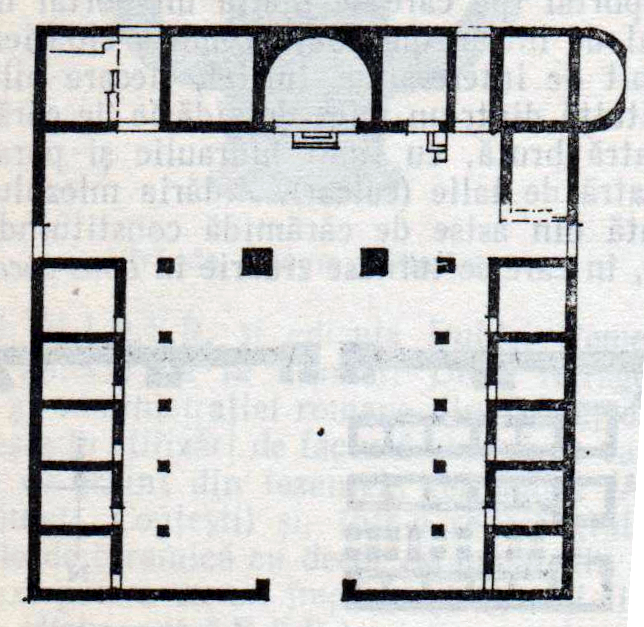
principia, phase 2

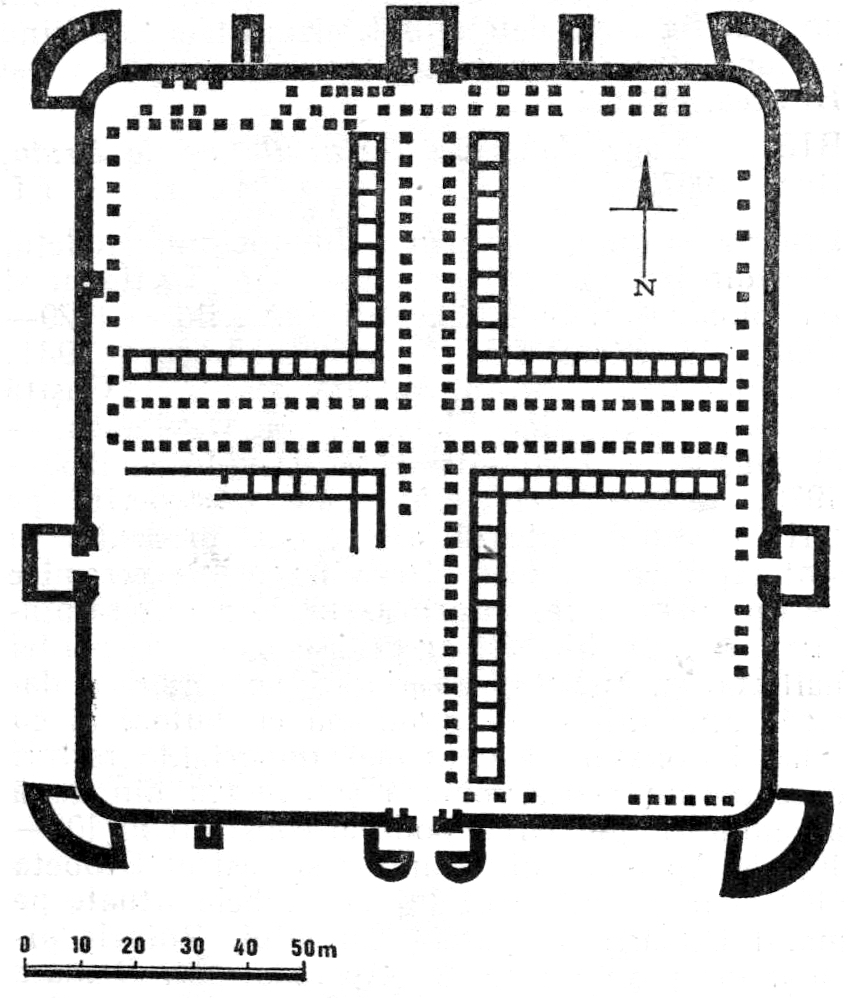
Phase 5 fort

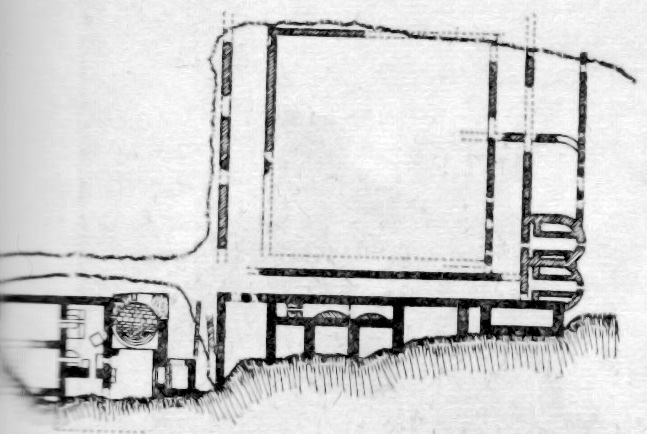
Baths

== Gallery ==
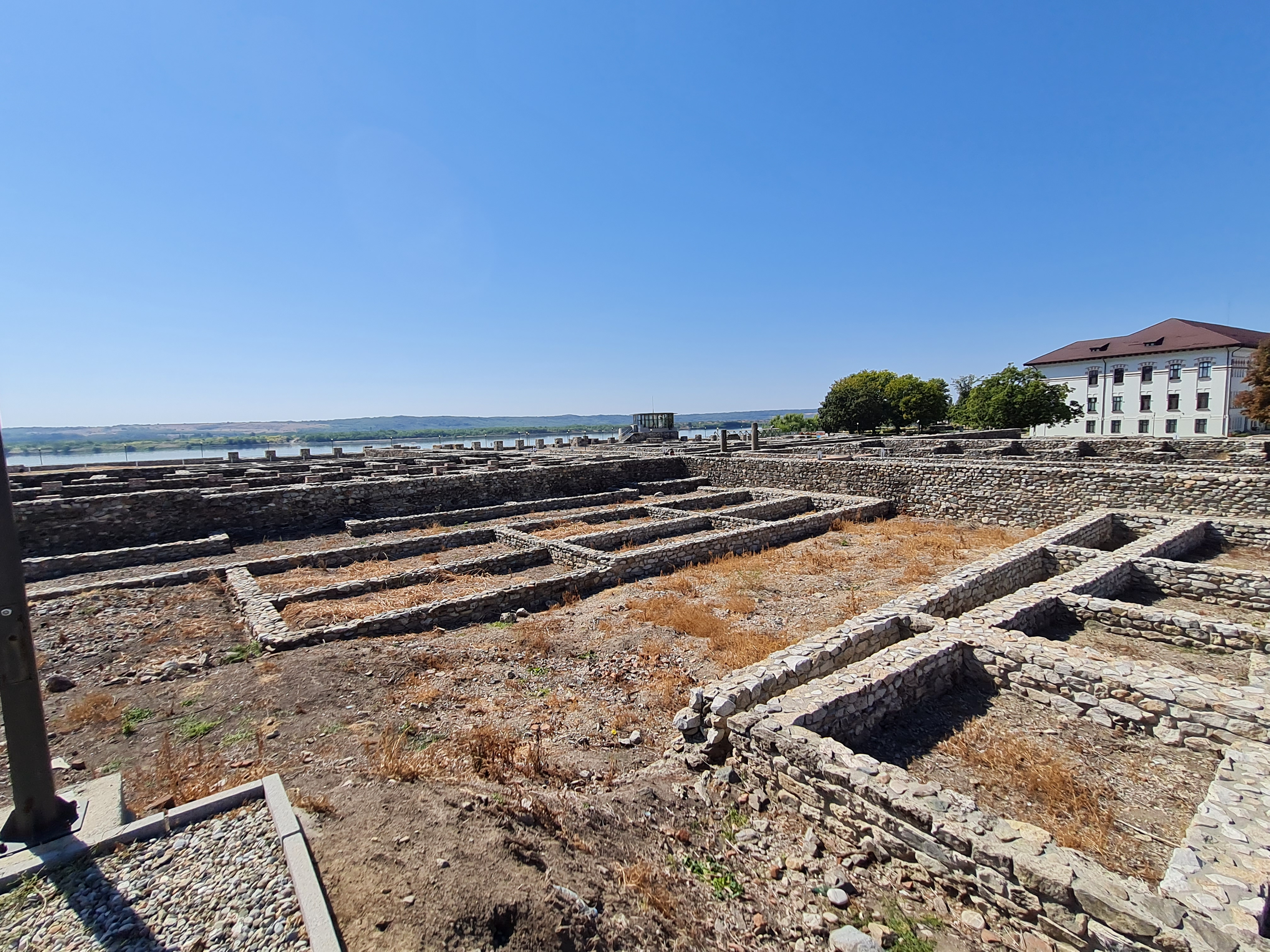

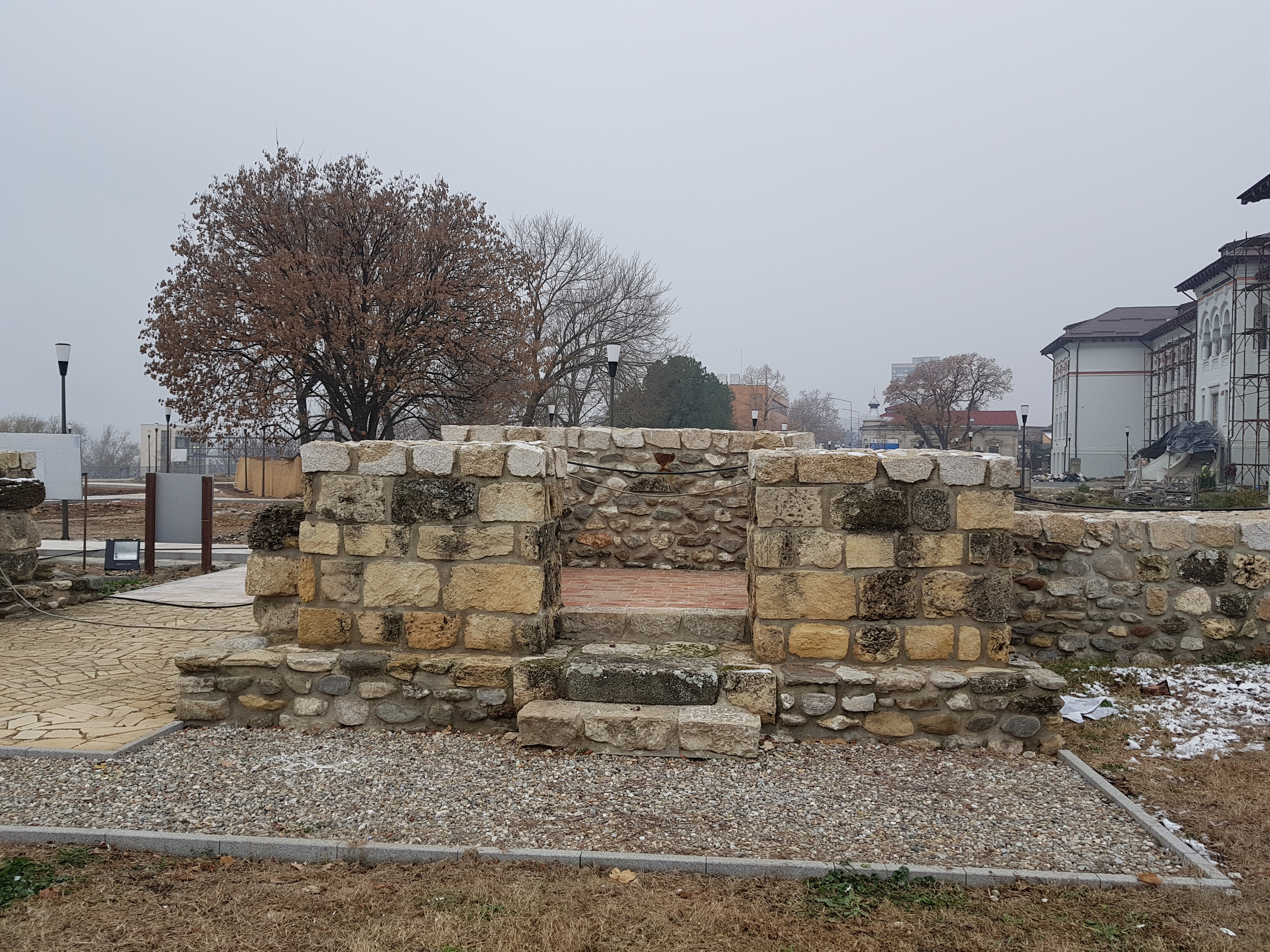

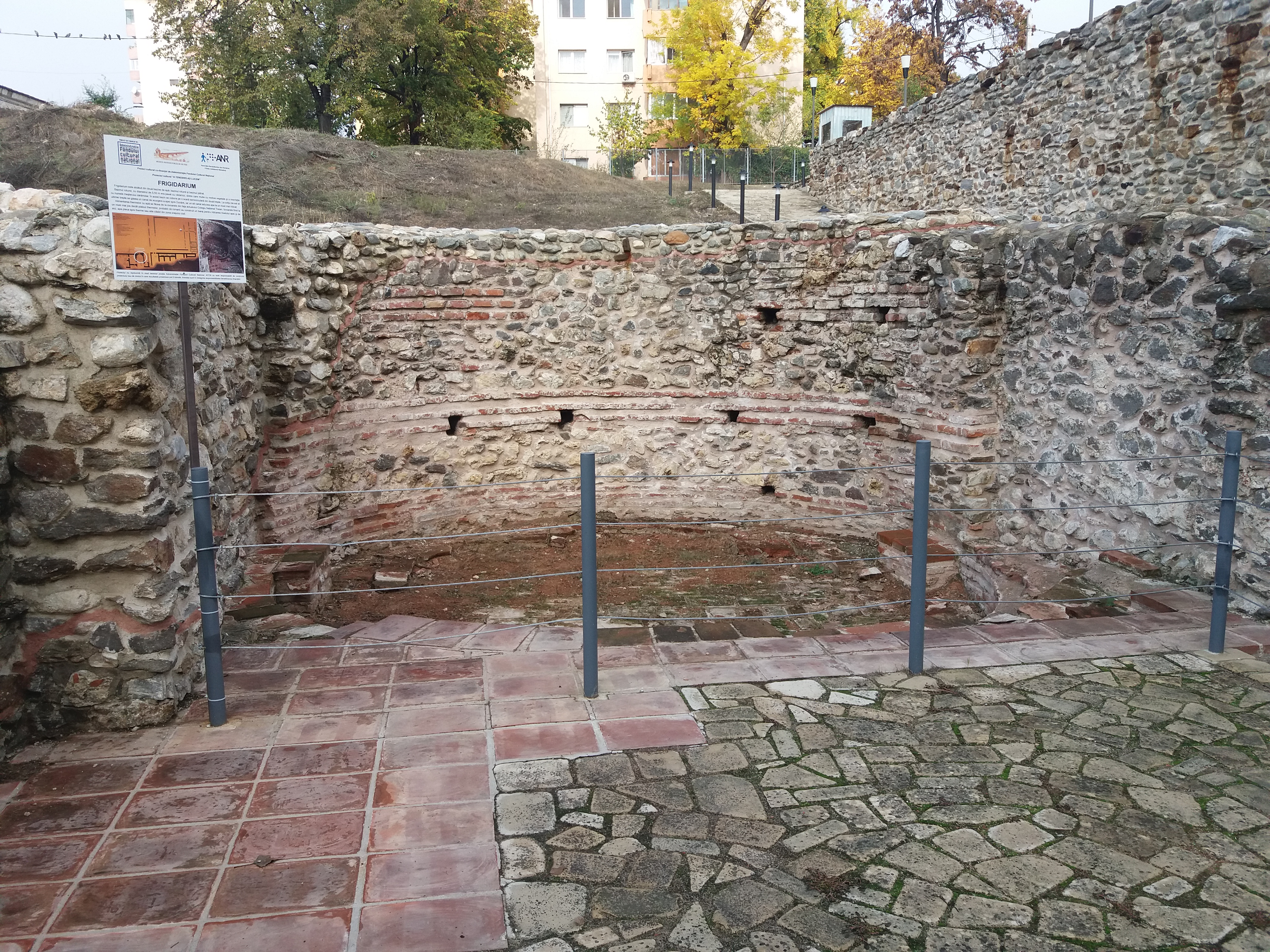
Frigidarium

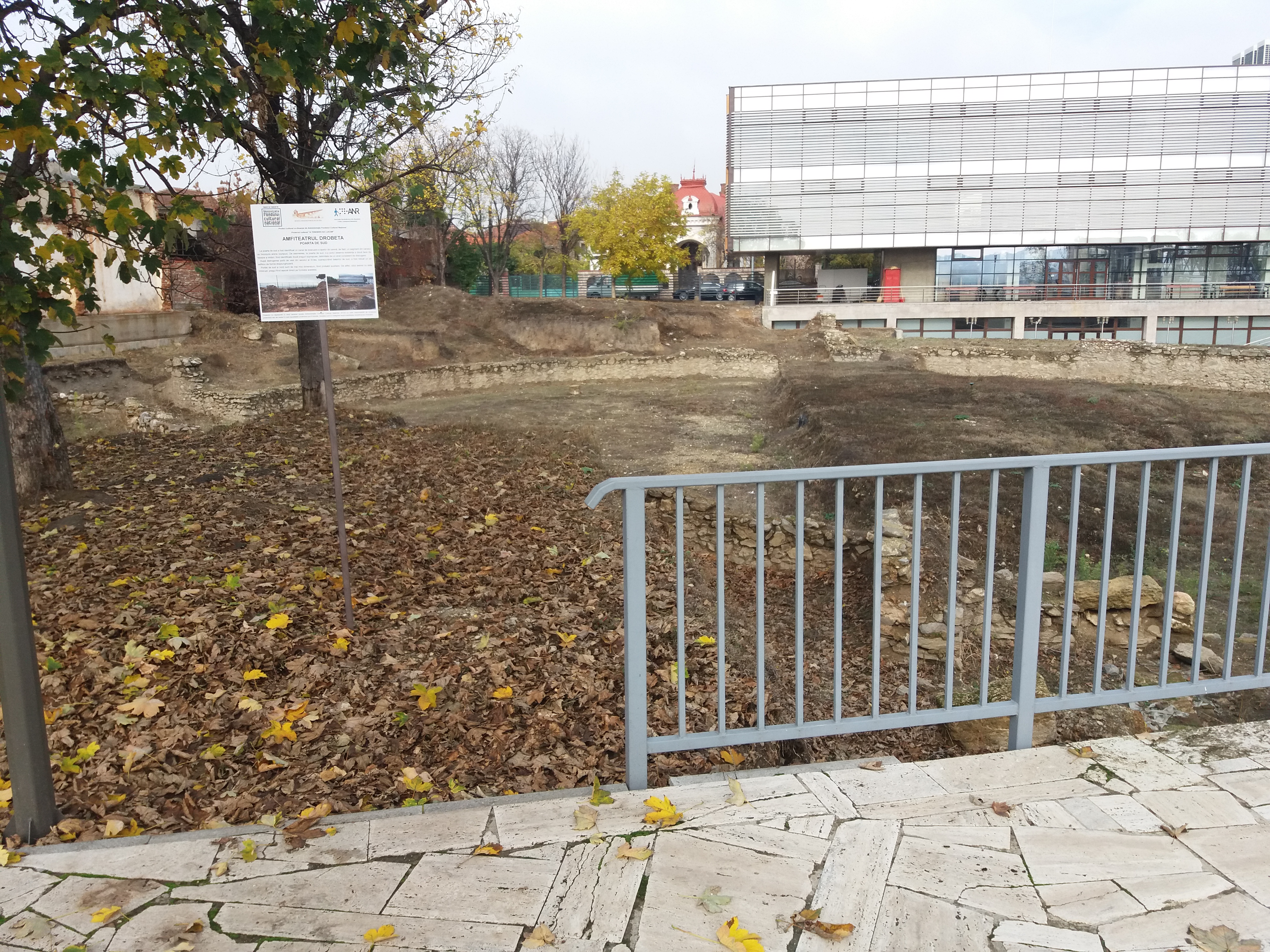
Roman Amphitheatre

== See also ==
- List of castra
