= Butoiești =

- Commune
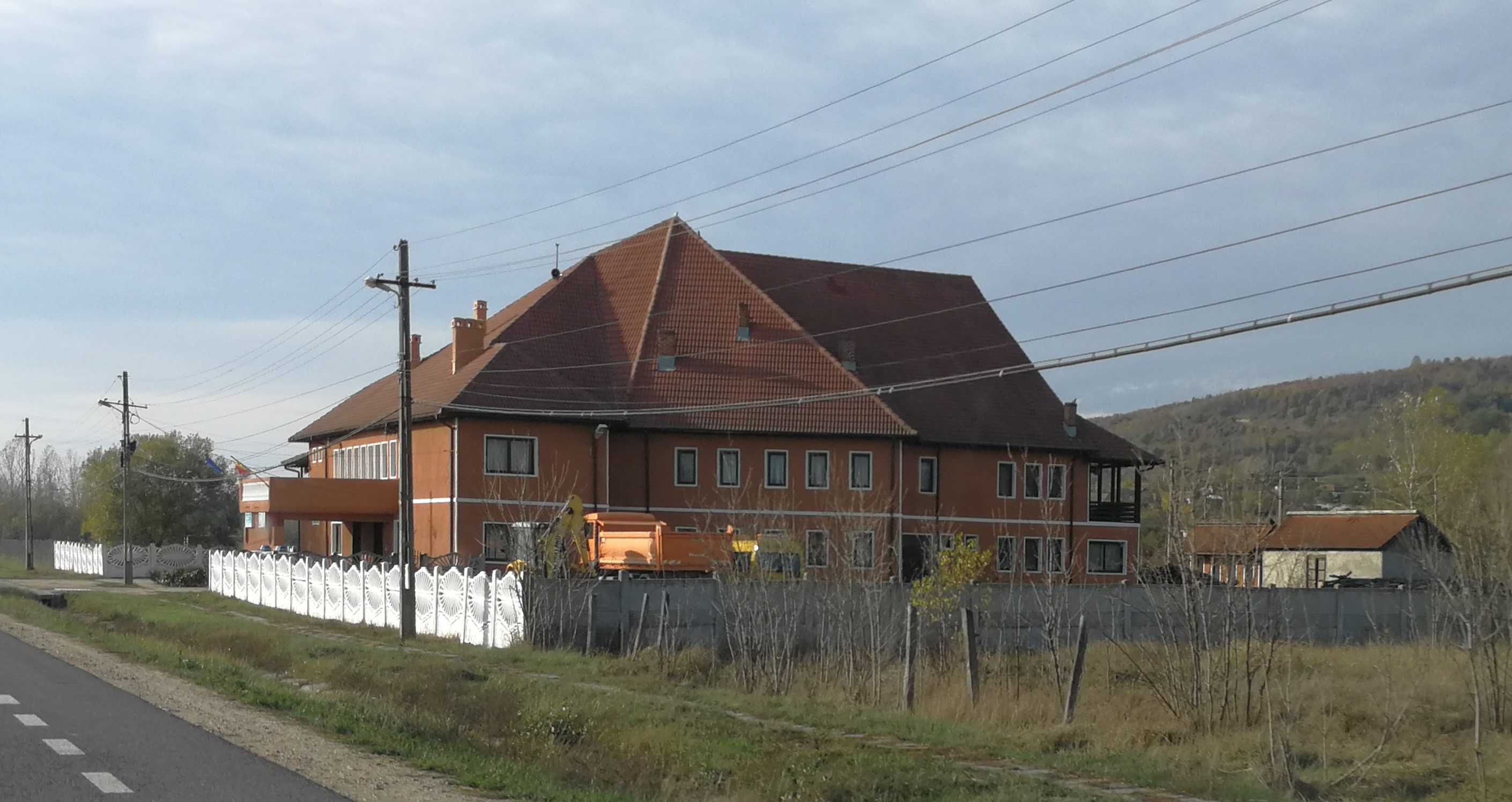
- Butoiești town hall

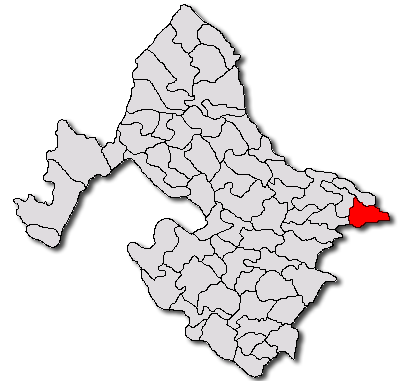
- Location in Mehedinți County

- Location in Romania
- Coordinates: 44°35′N 23°22′E
- Country: Romania
- County: Mehedinți

Government
  - Mayor (2020–2024): Gheorghe-Valentin Sălceanu (PNL)
- Elevation: 138 m (453 ft)
- Population (2021-12-01): 3,263
- Time zone: UTC+02:00 (EET)
  - Summer (DST): UTC+03:00 (EEST)
- Postal code: 227090
- Area code: +40 x52
- Vehicle reg.: MH
- Website: primariabutoiesti.ro

Butoiești is a commune located in Mehedinți County, Oltenia, Romania. It is composed of eight villages: Arginești, Butoiești, Buicești, Gura Motrului, Jugastru, Pluta, Răduțești, and Țânțaru.

== Natives ==
- Constantin Rădulescu-Motru (1868–1957), philosopher, psychologist, sociologist, academic, and politician
